= Bolis =

Bolis may refer to:

== People ==
- Bolis Pupul (born 1985), pseudonym of Belgian music Boris Zeebroek
- Thomas Bolis (born 1998), Italian football player
- Luigi Bolis (1839–1905), Italian opera singer

== Other ==
- Calyptoliva bolis, species of sea snail
- "Boliš i ne prolaziš", 2017 song by Lepa Brena

== See also ==
- Boli (disambiguation)
- Pizza Boli's, American pizzeria chain
