= Boli =

Boli may refer to:

== Places ==
=== China ===
- Boli County (勃利县), Heilongjiang, China
  - Boli, Heilongjiang (勃利镇), town in and seat of Boli County
- Boli, Jiangsu (博里镇), town in Chuzhou District, Huai'an, Jiangsu, China

=== Other countries ===
- Boli Rural District, in Iran
- Boli, Côte d'Ivoire, town and commune
- Bolu, Turkey ("Boli" having been one historical spelling)
- Khabarovsk, formerly known by the Chinese name Boli (伯力), major city of the Russian Far East

== People ==
- Basile Boli (born 1967), French football player
- Yannick Boli (born 1988), Thai football player

== Food ==
- Boli (food), South Indian sweet flatbread
- Boli (plantain), the name for roasted plantain in Nigeria
- Boli, Mexican ice pop
- Pizza Boli's, American pizzeria chain

== Other ==
- Boli (TV series), a Bangladeshi streaming television series
- Boli, a fetish of Mali
- Boli (steroid)
- Bank-owned life insurance
- Oregon Bureau of Labor and Industries

== See also ==
- Bolis (disambiguation)
- Boliyan, a style of music popular in Punjab
