= The Mama Ayesha's Restaurant Presidential Mural =

Mural by Karla Rodas in Washington, D.C.

- Artist: Karlisima
- Year: 2009
- Type: Paint & Tile
- Dimensions: 7.3 m × 18 m (24 ft × 60 ft)
- Location: Washington, D.C., United States; 38°55′24.51″N 77°2′48.67″W
- Owner: Mama Ayeshas

The Mama Ayesha's Restaurant Presidential Mural is a large mural in Washington, D.C. featuring eleven American Presidents, starting with Dwight D. Eisenhower and ending with Barack Obama. Created in 2009 by El Salvador-born artist Karla Rodas (a.k.a. Karlisima), the mural was funded by the D.C. Commission on the Arts and Humanities. It has been described by locals as being DC's "largest postcard."

== Description ==
The Presidential Mural in Washington, DC

The mural is painted on the exterior wall of Mama Ayesha's, a Middle Eastern restaurant in the Adams Morgan neighborhood, on Calvert Street near the eastern end of the Duke Ellington Bridge. It depicts selected United States Presidents standing in front of the White House. The owner of the restaurant, Mama Ayesha, stands in the middle between Jimmy Carter and Ronald Reagan, with their arms interlocked. A bald eagle is shown flying in the upper left corner near trees losing their leaves in the Fall season, in the background is the Lincoln Memorial. Cherry blossom trees are shown in bloom by the White House. On the right side of the mural is the Lincoln Memorial Reflecting Pool, the Jefferson Memorial, the Washington Monument and the United States Capitol. In front of the reflecting pool is a section painted blue for the next President. A mosaic of the United States Flag appears on either side of the painting.

== Funding and concept ==
The mural was funded by the DC Commission on the Arts & Humanities, the National Endowment for the Arts, Mama Ayesha's Restaurant, and private donors. Karlisima started the mural in 2007 and completed it in 2009.

The mural's concept was planned by Mama Ayesha's family members, who have run the restaurant since its opening in 1960. Originally Mama Ayesha was not going to be the female centerpiece of the work. The family had invited Helen Thomas, a renowned White House reporter of Lebanese descent and regular customer at the restaurant, to be included in the mural; she was to be shown seated at a desk with pen and paper in her hand. The family's request was politely declined by a "modest" Thomas, who supported portraying Mama Ayesha in her place.

== Karlisima ==
Karla Rodas, a native of El Salvador, moved to Alexandria, Virginia with her family as a child. A graduate of Annandale High School and Washington University in St. Louis, she returned to the District to become one of the city's most well-known muralists. Her work is seen on the walls and in the collections of local establishments such as Famous Luigi's, Cafe Atlantico, and Wesley United Methodist Church, among others.

Rodas provided this statement upon completion of the mural:

The P.A.B.C. initiative (Public Art Building Communities), has allowed me to make a bridge between the community, the Restaurant Mama Ayesha’s, the arts and all the people who have made this mural a reality. This could not be done without the support of all the community and the help of the DC Commission and the Restaurant and all the entities who funded the project. I hope that this mural will become a teaching tool of the History of the Presidents for schools, children and the public in general. This is a gift to the City of Washington DC to celebrate this historical moment in American History and will remain open to the public to see for generations to come. This is fulfilling the idea that mural art is available for the public and for the masses.

== Reception ==
In 2009 the mural was ranked as the second-best Obama mural in the city (after Shepard Fairey's murals at the restaurant Marvin), in the Washington City Paper's "Best of D.C."
