= Jane Tunstall Lingo =

American journalist (1924–2007)

- Born: September 7, 1924; Washington, DC
- Died: February 23, 2007 (aged 82); Alexandria, Virginia
- Education: George Washington University
- Occupations: Journalist, writer, George Washington University administrator
- Parent(s): Benjamin Harrison Lingo; Marie Tunstall

Jane Tunstall Lingo (September 7, 1924 – February 23, 2007) was an American journalist, long-time employee of George Washington University, and active socialite who counted U.S. President Harry S. Truman's daughter Margaret Truman among her close friends.

== Education ==
Lingo earned a bachelor's degree in French language and literature from George Washington University in 1946, with close friend Margaret Truman.

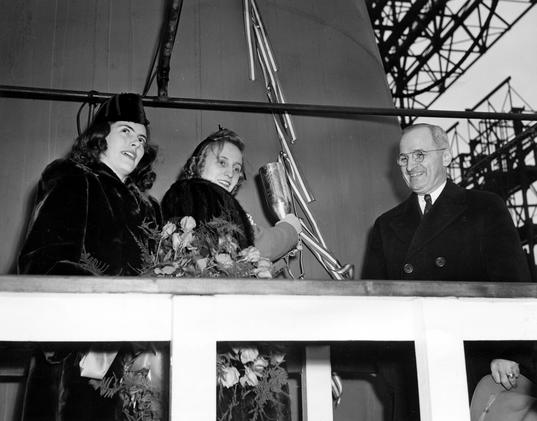
Jane Tunstall Lingo, Margaret Truman, and Senator Harry S. Truman at the launching of the U.S.S. Missouri, January 29, 1944.

== Career ==
After spending a decade traveling and performing volunteer service, Lingo returned to George Washington University in 1956 as a staff writer in the Office of University Relations. She served there for eight years, and became GWU's Assistant Director of University Relations in 1964, where she worked until her death.

One of the first women invited to join the National Press Club in 1971, Lingo was noted as a trailblazer for women journalists. She served as president of the American News Women's Club from 1990 to 1992 and as Parliamentarian for the Board of Governors in later years.

== Social activities ==
As a young adult during World War II, Lingo became active in District social life, volunteering with the American Red Cross, translating letters in French, and making surgical dressings. She assisted the United Service Organizations (USO) with special events, was a member of the Junior League of Washington, for which she was a contributing author for the league's book "The City of Washington", and worked on a long-running children's television program as part of a marionette troupe.

She was a member of Pi Beta Phi sorority, the GW Hospital Women's Board, the Faculty Women's Club and Columbian Women, which is the school's oldest scholarship support group.

Lingo served on the Adams Morgan Neighborhood Association and the former Mayor's Advisory Committee for Neighborhood Beautification, was a member of the National Society of the Colonial Dames of America, a docent at Dumbarton House, and an active supporter of Hillwood Estate, Museum & Gardens, Blair House, the Washington National Opera and the Shakespeare Theatre Company. She also was a member of the Sulgrave Club, working to save the Wadsworth House on Massachusetts Avenue in DC, and was a board member of the YWCA of the National Capital Area.

She worked with the Democratic National Committee in the office of vice-chairman Margaret Price during several presidential campaigns and assisted with presidential inaugurations.

== Honors and awards ==
During her years at GW, Lingo earned membership in Phi Beta Kappa, and Mortar Board.

To honor her service to George Washington University, the university alumni association created an award to recognize alumni service and honor her memory, the Jane Lingo Distinguished Alumni Service Award, presented each year to alumni who not only meet the criteria for the Distinguished Alumni Service Award but are also employed as a member of the faculty or staff. The university's Gelman Library established the Jane Tunstall Lingo Memorial Special Collections Fund for friends and admirers to honor her.

== Personal ==
Lingo was a daughter of Benjamin Harrison and Marie (née Tunstall) Lingo. Her father was a career U.S. Navy man, and her mother was the director of the Washington, D.C., United Service Organization (USO). She lived in her family's home in the Adams Morgan district of D.C. Her family also owned a historic home in Lovingston, Virginia, "Peebles Hill", which she renovated in 1967 after inheriting it.

Lingo was active with the First Church of Christ, Scientist in Northwest DC.

Lingo was a friend of journalist Helen Thomas, with whom she became acquainted in the 1940s when attending events at the White House during the Truman administration.

At her death, Lingo had no immediate survivors.
