= Carry the Rainbow on Your Shoulders =

Public artwork by Jerome Meadows

- Artist: Jerome Meadows
- Year: 1997
- Dimensions: 774 cm × 243.84 cm (304.8 in × 96.00 in)
- Location: Washington, D.C., United States; 38.923219°N 77.041529°W

Carry the Rainbow on Your Shoulders is a public artwork by American artist Jerome Meadows, located in the Adams Morgan neighborhood in Washington, D.C., United States. "Carry the Rainbow on Your Shoulders" was created through DC Commission on the Arts and Humanities.

== Description ==
Made of a mix of concrete and mosaic the piece shows a faceless adult with a faceless child crawling on its back. The concrete sculptures are mixed with rainbow colored mosaic pieces. The sculpture sits in the center of Unity Park.

== History of the piece ==
The sculpture was chosen as site specific competition.

In May 2017, Unity Park underwent reconstruction and preservation work. Carry the Rainbow on Your Shoulders underwent conservation, including the fountain, which was restored to working order.

== Jerome Meadows ==
Meadows was born in the Bronx, New York and received his B.F.A. in 1973 from the Rhode Island School of Design and his M.F.A. from the University of Maryland in 1981. As a previous faculty member at the Baltimore School for the Arts, North Adams State College and the DC College of Fine Arts, Meadows settled in Savannah, Georgia in 1997. His work is seen in the collections of the cities of Albuquerque, New Mexico, Alexandria, Virginia and Anchorage, Alaska.
