= Adams Morgan Organization =

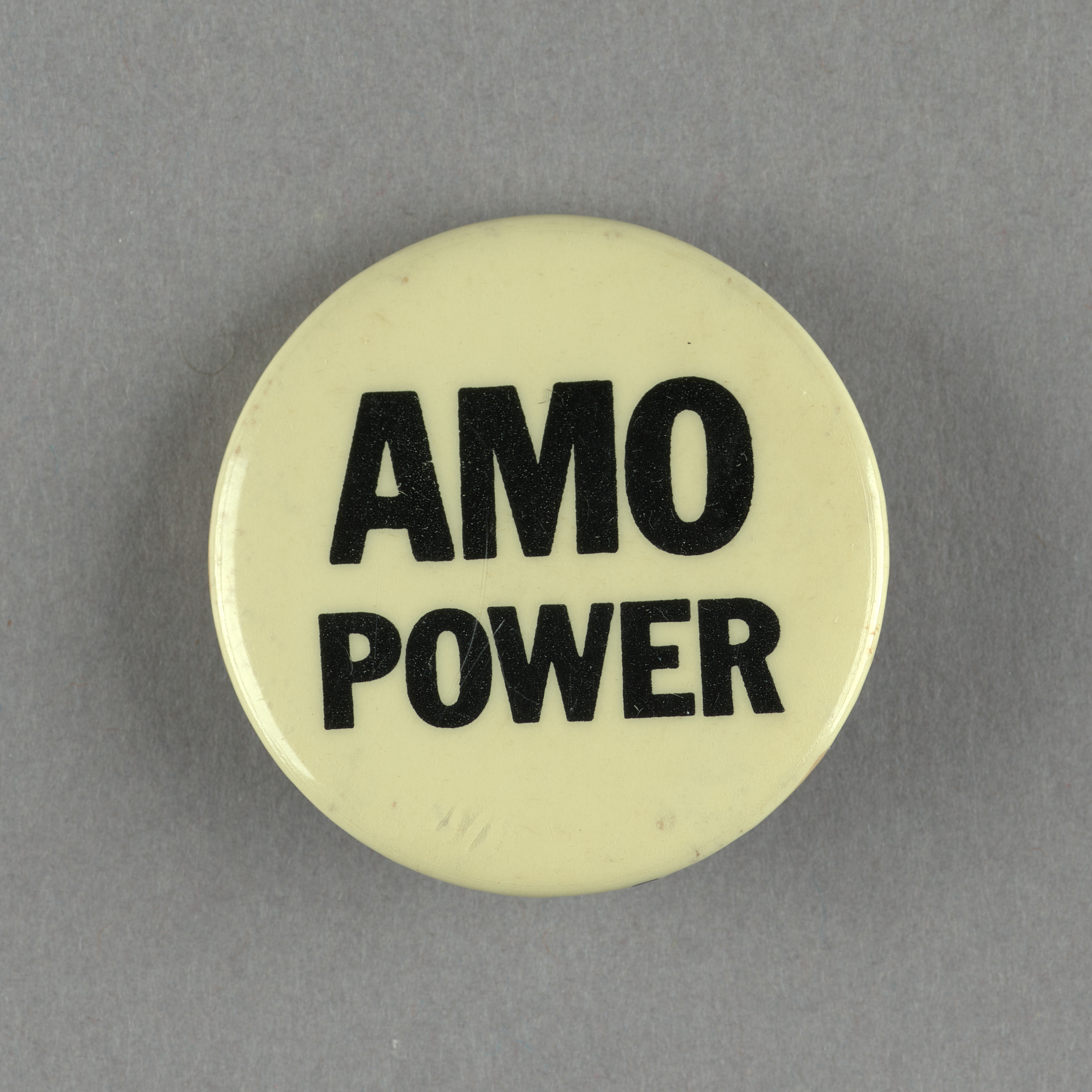
A button labeled "AMO Power," created by the Adams Morgan Organization

The Adams Morgan Organization (AMO) was a neighborhood community group based in Adams Morgan, Washington, DC. AMO was founded in the 1972 and its slogan was "Unity in Diversity." In 1976, after a spate of evictions, AMO helped create a community land trust along with tenant organizations in the area. AMO organized against harmful urban renewal projects and real-estate speculation in DC. In 1974, AMO also helped the neighborhood reclaim derelict land as "Community Park West," which is now named after AMO organizer Walter Peirce.

AMO was part of a movement toward hyperlocal neighborhood government, especially in DC where this movement was institutionalized in the system of Advisory Neighborhood Commissioners after the passage of the DC Home Rule Act.

== See also ==
- Crown Heights Tenant Union
- District of Columbia statehood movement
- Student Nonviolent Coordinating Committee
