= Euclid Apartments =

- U.S. National Register of Historic Places
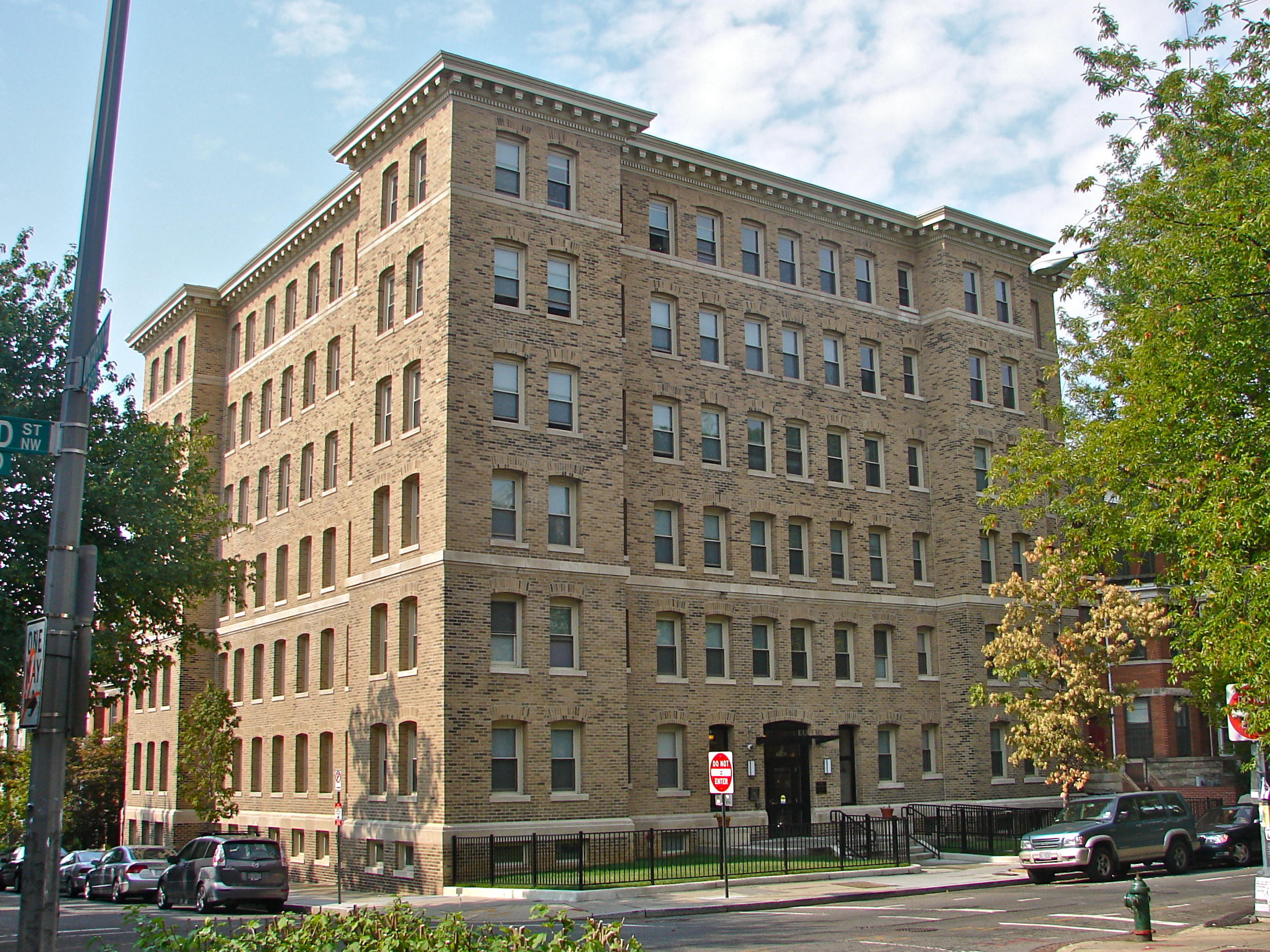

- Location within Washington, D.C.
- Location: 1740 Euclid St, NW; Washington, D.C.
- Coordinates: 38°55′22″N 77°2′26″W
- Built: 1920
- MPS: Apartment Buildings in Washington, DC, MPS
- NRHP reference No.: 10000239
- Added to NRHP: December 26, 2001

Euclid Apartments is a historic structure located in the Adams Morgan neighborhood of Washington, D.C. The building was completed in 1920 and contains 47 units. The building was renovated from 2009 to 2011. It was listed on the National Register of Historic Places in 2010.
