= Reed-Cooke =

Neighborhood of Washington, D.C.

- Neighborhood of Washington, D.C.
- Location within the District of Columbia
- Coordinates: 38.9212°N 77.0391°W
- Country: United States
- District: Washington, D.C.
- Ward: Ward 1

Government
  - Councilmember: Brianne Nadeau
- Postal code: ZIP code

Reed-Cooke is a small urban neighborhood in Northwest Washington, D.C., situated within the boundaries of the larger and more prominent neighborhood of Adams Morgan, just north of the city's original L'Enfant-planned area. Its residents, and its local civic organization, the Reed-Cooke Neighborhood Association, generally consider it to be a distinct local neighborhood, although it is not on the city's list of formally recognized neighborhoods. While Reed-Cooke is most popularly considered a section of Adams Morgan, the area is sometimes considered to be an extension of the Meridian Hill neighborhood.

Located just to the west of Meridian Hill Park, Reed-Cooke is bounded by 16th Street on the east, 18th Street on the west, U St to the south, and Columbia Road to the north. This area takes its name from the two schools that sit within its borders: the H.D. Cooke Elementary School, and the Marie Reed Elementary School and Learning Center. Reed-Cooke began to develop its own identity in the 1980s as renewed citizen interest in the city was generally occurring, and the area's residents began to take a more active interest in the local neighborhood's future. This interest resulted in the creation of the "Reed-Cooke Overlay District", a zoning area formed by the city in 1991 to help conserve the existing neighborhood's composition, and to manage new development. (The Overlay District also includes a small area south of Florida Avenue, down to U Street.) Since the year 2000, and working within this zoning framework, a number of new mid-rise apartment houses and condo buildings have been constructed in the area.

The land of the neighborhood was once a part of the old Meridian Hill estate of Commodore David Porter, who created that noted estate in 1816. Following the end of the Civil War, Meridian Hill's land was sold and then subdivided in 1867, creating one of Washington's earliest planned subdivisions. Initially this area grew slowly, with the Reed-Cooke portion of the tract subsequently being developed in large part from just after 1900. The neighborhood today continues to evolve and is mainly composed of a mix of rowhouses and low- to mid-rise apartment buildings, in a variety of styles and sizes, from simple to quite elaborate. Many of the apartment buildings are condos or co-ops. There are also several stretches of light commercial buildings along Columbia Road. With the city of Washington's population continuing to grow, Reed-Cooke is also slowly growing, mostly with in-fill construction. At the end of 2017, a new boutique hotel, named The Line, opened at 1770 Euclid Street in the northwest corner of the neighborhood. In the years after 2018 some residents and groups have also been using the older "Meridian Hill" name when referring to the area.

Reed-Cooke is a part of the District's ward 1. And within D.C.'s Advisory Neighborhood Commission system, it is a part of ANC 1-C.
