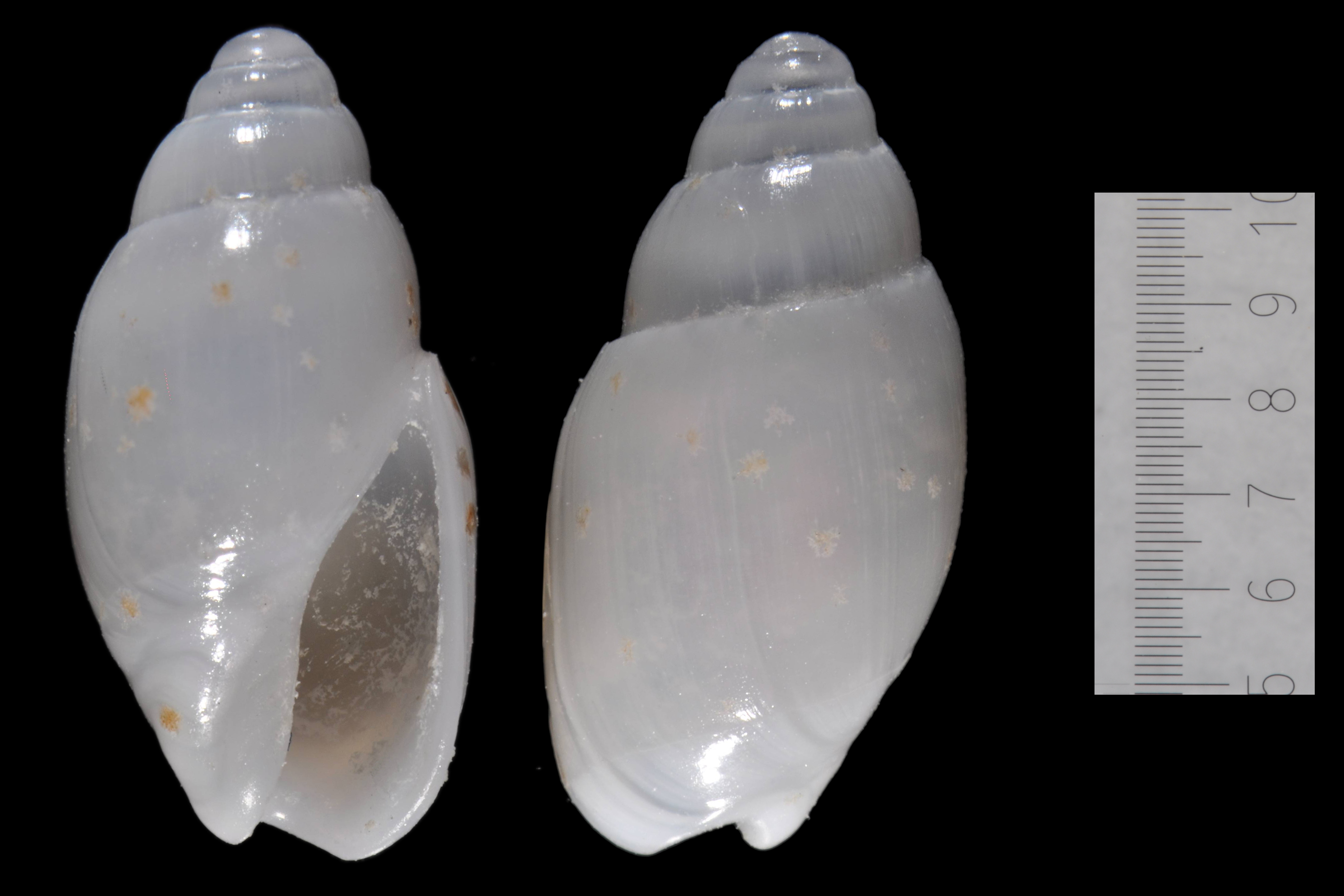
- Shell of Calyptoliva bbugeae (holotype at MNHN, Paris)

Scientific classification
- Kingdom: Animalia
- Phylum: Mollusca
- Class: Gastropoda
- Subclass: Caenogastropoda
- Order: Neogastropoda
- Superfamily: Olivoidea
- Family: Olividae
- Genus: Calyptoliva; Kantor & Bouchet, 2007

Type species
- Calyptoliva bolis Kantor & Bouchet, 2007

= Calyptoliva =

Genus of gastropods

Calyptoliva is a genus of sea snails, marine gastropod mollusks in the family Olividae.

== Species ==
Species within the genus Calyptoliva include:

- Calyptoliva amblys Kantor & Bouchet, 2007
- Calyptoliva bbugeae Kantor, Fedosov, Puillandre & Bouchet, 2016
- Calyptoliva bolis Kantor & Bouchet, 2007
- Calyptoliva tatyanae Kantor & Bouchet, 2007
