= Jumbo slice =

Very large slice of pizza

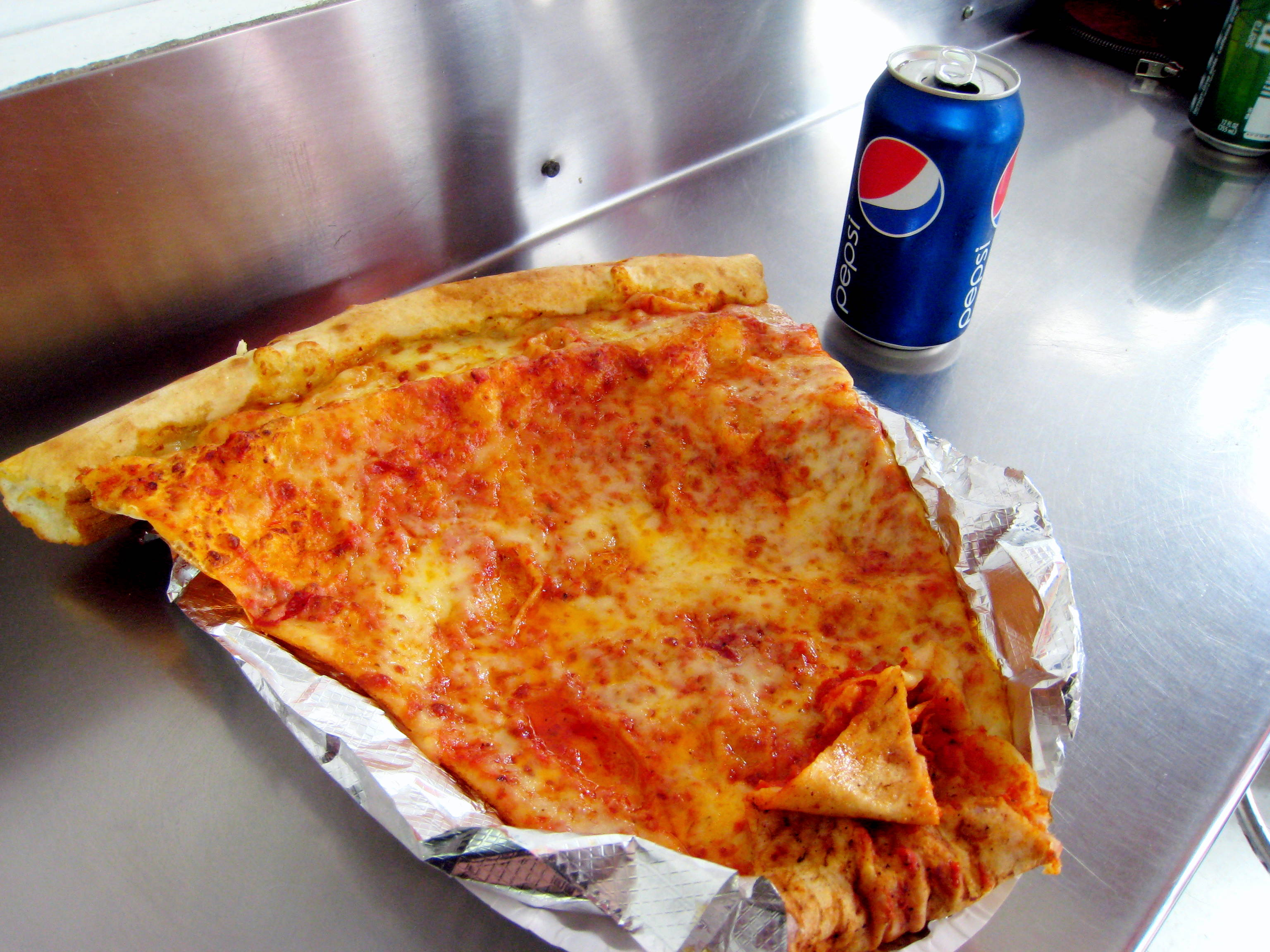
A jumbo slice in Adams Morgan

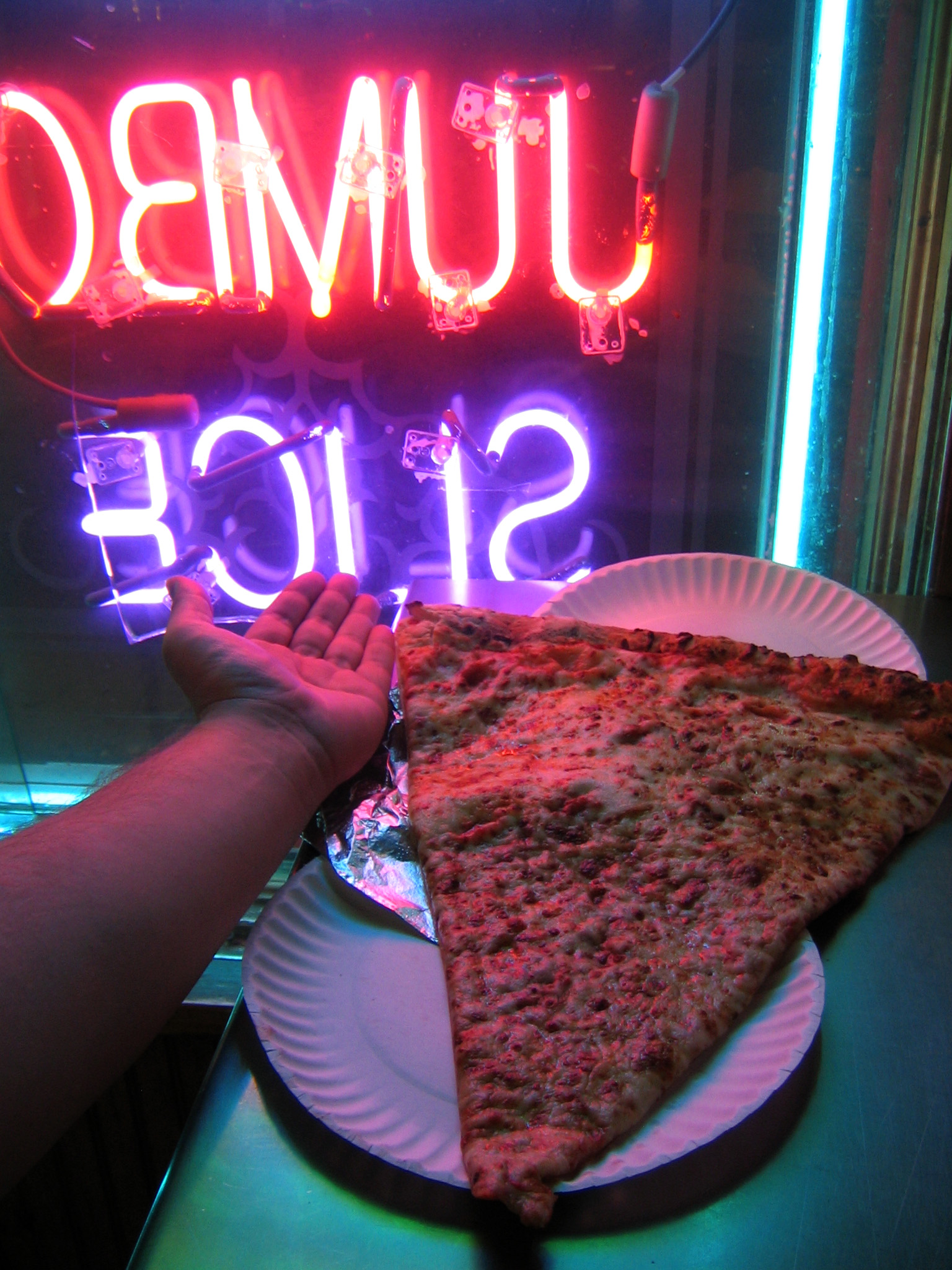
A jumbo slice served on multiple paper plates

A jumbo slice is an oversized New York–style pizza sold by the slice to go, especially popular in the Adams Morgan neighborhood of Washington, D.C., and Morningside Heights, a neighborhood of New York City. A circular pizza pie from which jumbo slices are cut may be up to 36 inches (90 cm) in diameter, and individual slices can be more than 1 foot (30 cm) long. As a phenomenon, the jumbo slice has been covered by local and national media for their unusually large size, the late-night crowd they tend to attract, and the ongoing rivalry among pizza proprietors claiming ownership of the term and of the largest slices.

== Ingredients ==
Typically, jumbo slices are offered in only two varieties: cheese and pepperoni. Individual slices can measure more than 1 foot (30 cm) in length, weigh approximately 1 pound (0.5 kg), and are typically folded to eat. Dough balls for jumbo slice pies can weigh more than 4 pounds (1.8 kg). Prior to application, sauce is held in a large receptacle sometimes nicknamed a "garbage can", and the mozzarella-provolone cheese mix can arrive in 900-pound (410 kg) shipments. A single jumbo slice may contain more than 1,000 kilocalories (4200 kJ), as confirmed in a study conducted by ABC Research Corp. on behalf of the Washington City Paper.

== History ==
Koronet Pizza, located in the Morningside Heights neighborhood in New York City, began selling oversized pie slices upon its opening in 1981. By 1990, Koronet's slices were cut from 30-inch (80 cm) pies, and had gained a following among students of nearby Columbia University. Koronet's offering eventually came to be referred to as a "jumbo slice" pizza.

The first jumbo slice pizzerias in Washington, D.C., were established on 18th Street NW in Adams Morgan, a neighborhood known for its many bars. Jumbo slices are considered a staple for hungry late-night bar-hoppers, especially after last call around 3 a.m. On a weekend night, a jumbo slice shop can produce approximately 800 pounds (360 kg) of pizza, with most sales in a given week made over the course of about eight weekend hours.

Interiors of the D.C. shops are sparse, featuring only stools and counters, with no wall adornments or customer restrooms. Outside, the late-night scene has been described as "a kind of impromptu outdoor party". Bicycle-mounted Metro Police officers have made the area a regular post location on weekend nights.

Not all D.C. residents are enthusiastic about the jumbo slice. Elana Schor wrote in The Hill, "The food custom that keeps me up at night ... is the jumbo slice. Slung onto paper plates in neon-drenched dishonor, barely tasty even at 2 a.m., it is too disappointing to truly count as pizza." The jumbo slice phenomenon has also been a source of frustration for neighborhood residents. Pizza slices have often ended up as street litter, with a wind tunnel effect on 18th street sometimes carrying paper plates up toward Adams Mill Road. Patrons have been known to discard plates and unfinished slices up to a half-mile away, especially in the direction of the Woodley Park Metro station. According to Scott Bennett, owner of the nearby Amsterdam Falafelshop, "If you see Adams Morgan on Sunday morning, it looks like Chernobyl."

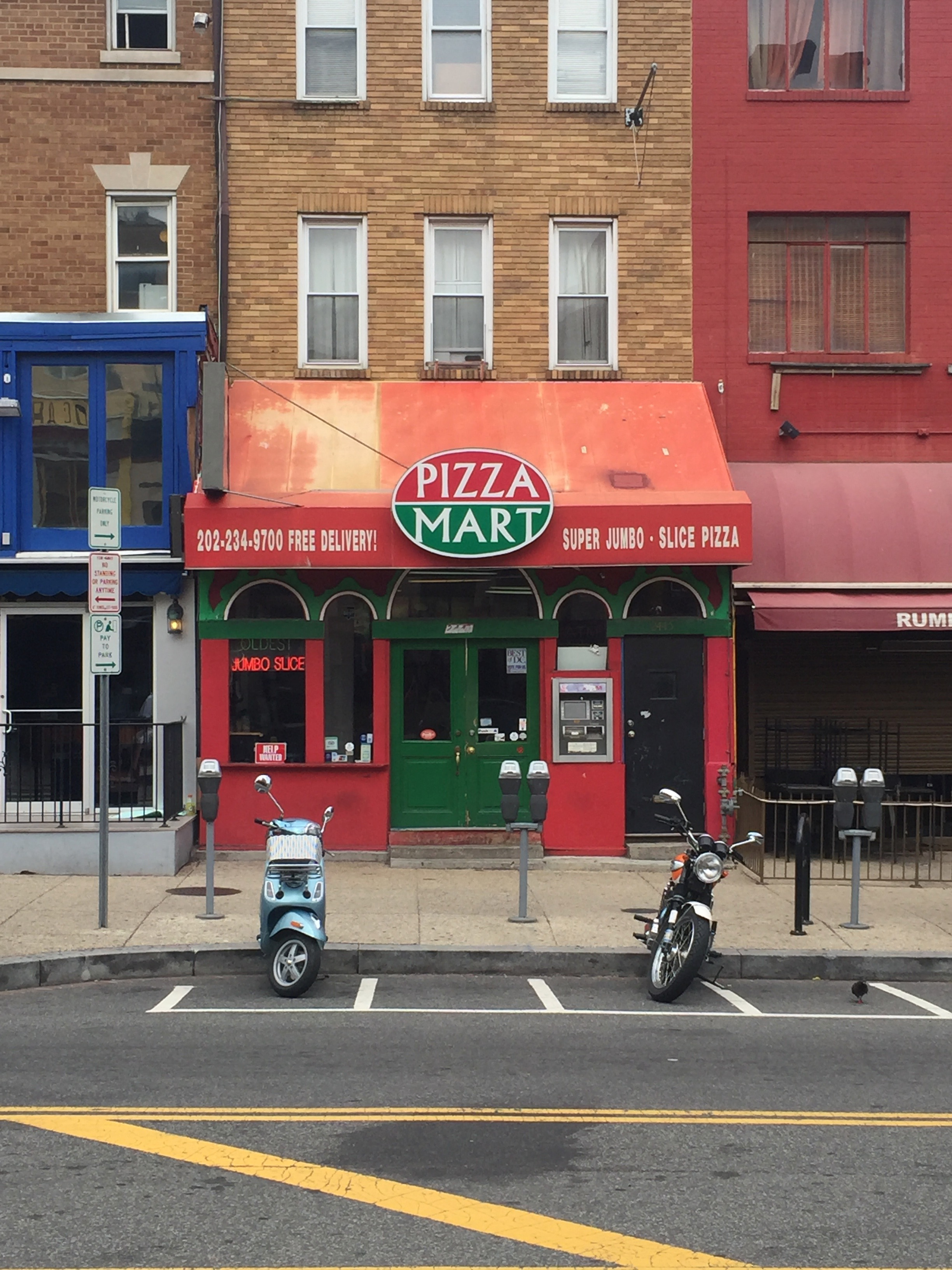
Pizza Mart in Adams Morgan, home of the "real original jumbo slice"

The term "jumbo slice" was first used in Adams Morgan by Chris Chishti, owner of Pizza Mart, which has operated in the neighborhood since the 1990s. (Note: Pizza Mart's opening has variously been reported as 1995, 1996, and 1997.) In 1999, Chishti started creating larger pies by combining standard pizza dough balls; his first "jumbo slice" pie was 18 inches (46 cm), and over time grew to 22 inches (56 cm), 28 inches (71 cm), and finally, 32 inches (81 cm). As the jumbo slice developed, Chishti upgraded to larger ovens and, once constrained by the maximum size commercially available, even experimented with oval pizzas.

Jawed Khan, a former Chishti employee, opened Pizza Napoli in 1999, offering slices from a 30-inch (76 cm) pie at a time when Chishti was still at 22 inches (56 cm). Khan, who also began using the term "jumbo slice", told the Washington City Paper: "We came in with the biggest slice." Chishti responded by going to a larger size, and staked his claim to the term by hanging a plastic sign in his window reading "Jumbo Slice".

In March 2003, the Pizza Boli's chain opened a franchise location three doors away from Pizza Mart. Owned by a former business partner of Chishti, John Nasir, and operated by Kerry Guneri, Pizza Boli's installed a neon sign reading "Original Jumbo Slice". Guneri explained the phrase, saying "I make the slices original. My slice is as original as the way they've made it in Italy for 2,000 years." In response, Chishti installed a nearly identical sign the very same day, reading "Real Original Jumbo Slice". Said Chishti: "When he gets fancy, I'm just responding to it." As part of the ongoing feud, in August 2003, Chishti installed another sign reading "First Oldest Original Jumbo Slice". According to the Washington City Paper, "what escaped both proprietors was the fact that nobody cares."

Other pizza shops in Washington, D.C., have also laid claim to the phrase "jumbo slice", including locations along the intersecting U Street corridor, and near the Catholic University of America in the Brookland neighborhood. As of December 2016, Adams Morgan establishments marketing themselves as selling the "jumbo slice" include Pizza Mart, Jumbo Slice Pizza, Duccini's Pizza, and Bestolli Pizza, which is the former Pizza Boli's, although the signage remains unchanged.

Angelo's of Baltimore has also been serving an 18" slice for at least 30 years, and unlike the Adams Morgan venues, it is actually a piece of an entire pizza. The pizzeria also offers an immense 26" (or, in the past, 30") "party pie" which challenges the narrow width of many Baltimore rowhouses. After closing in 2014 in Hampden, owners Tommy and Angelo Pizza reopened in 2019.

The phrase has also been used by pizzerias outside the Washington and New York areas, including D.C. Slice in Pittsburgh, which was inspired by the "legendary" Adams Morgan jumbo slice pizzas.

== In mass media ==
The jumbo slice has been recognized as a part of Washington, D.C. food culture in books, and its "dueling" establishments have been featured on the Travel Channel's Food Wars. Pizza Mart was judged the winner, with Top Chef's Carla Hall casting the deciding vote. Local media outlets have covered the jumbo slice phenomenon by sampling comparable slices, in some cases with an emphasis on undertaking the task while sober. In 2012 The Washington Post objected to a ranked list published by The Daily Meal calling Jumbo Slice Pizza the 12th best pizza in America.

== See also ==
- Pizza by the slice
