= Calyptoliva amblys =

Scientific classification
- Kingdom: Animalia
- Phylum: Mollusca
- Class: Gastropoda
- Subclass: Caenogastropoda
- Order: Neogastropoda
- Family: Olividae
- Genus: Calyptoliva
- Species: C. amblys

Binomial name
- Calyptoliva amblys Kantor & Bouchet, 2007

Species of gastropod

Calyptoliva amblys is a species of sea snail, a marine gastropod mollusk in the family Olividae, the olives.
