= Adams Morgan =

Neighborhood of Washington, D.C.

- Neighborhood
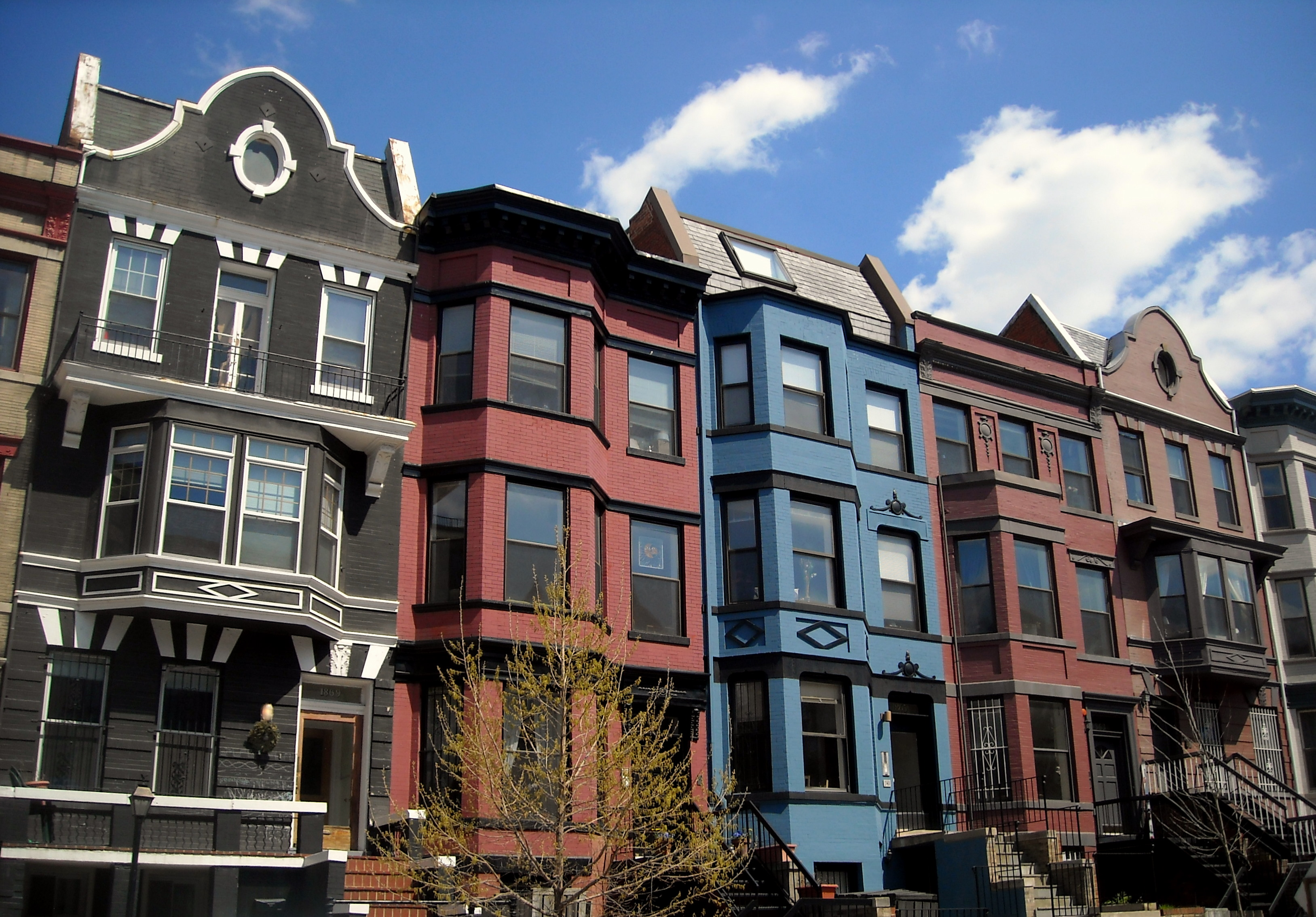
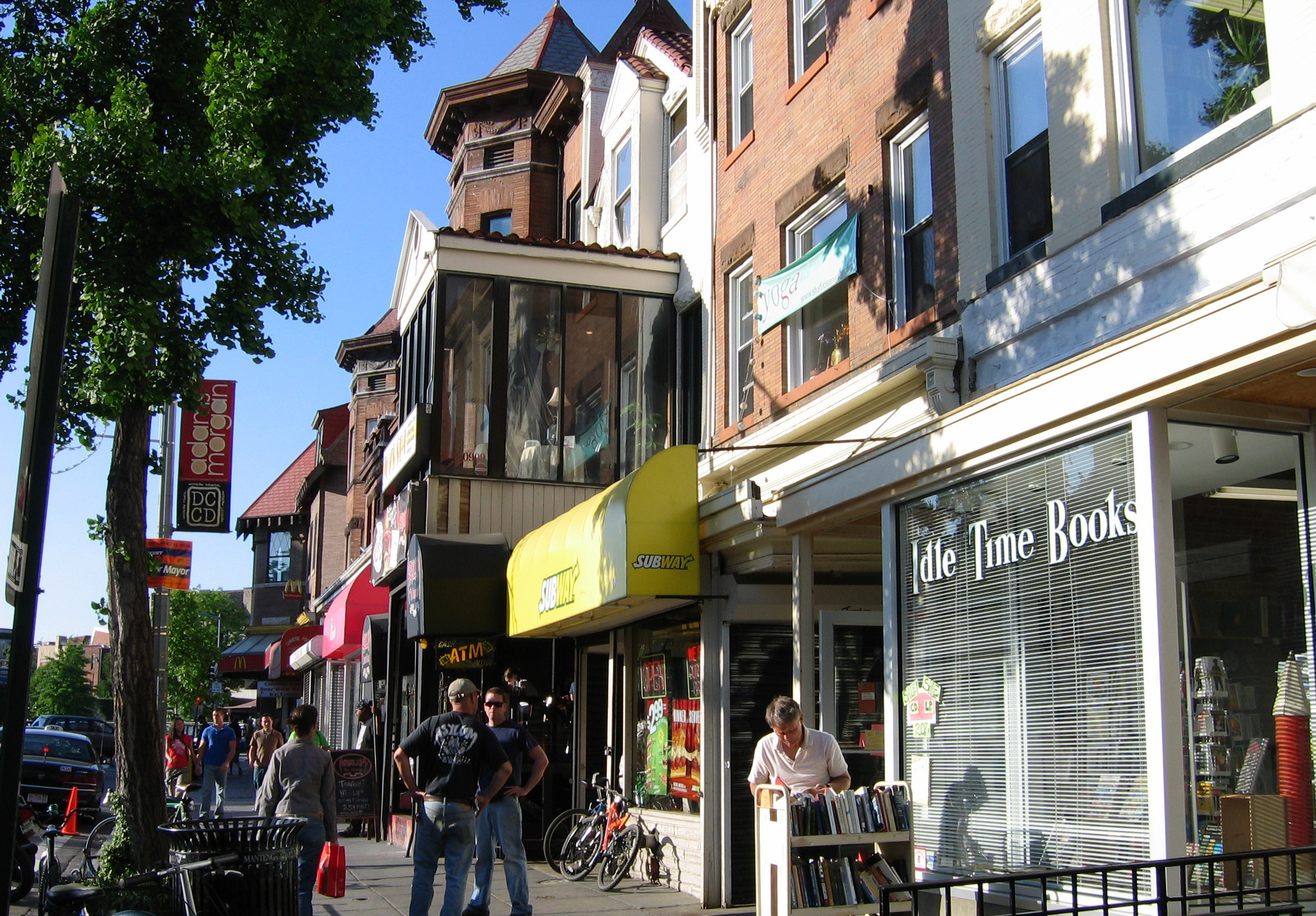
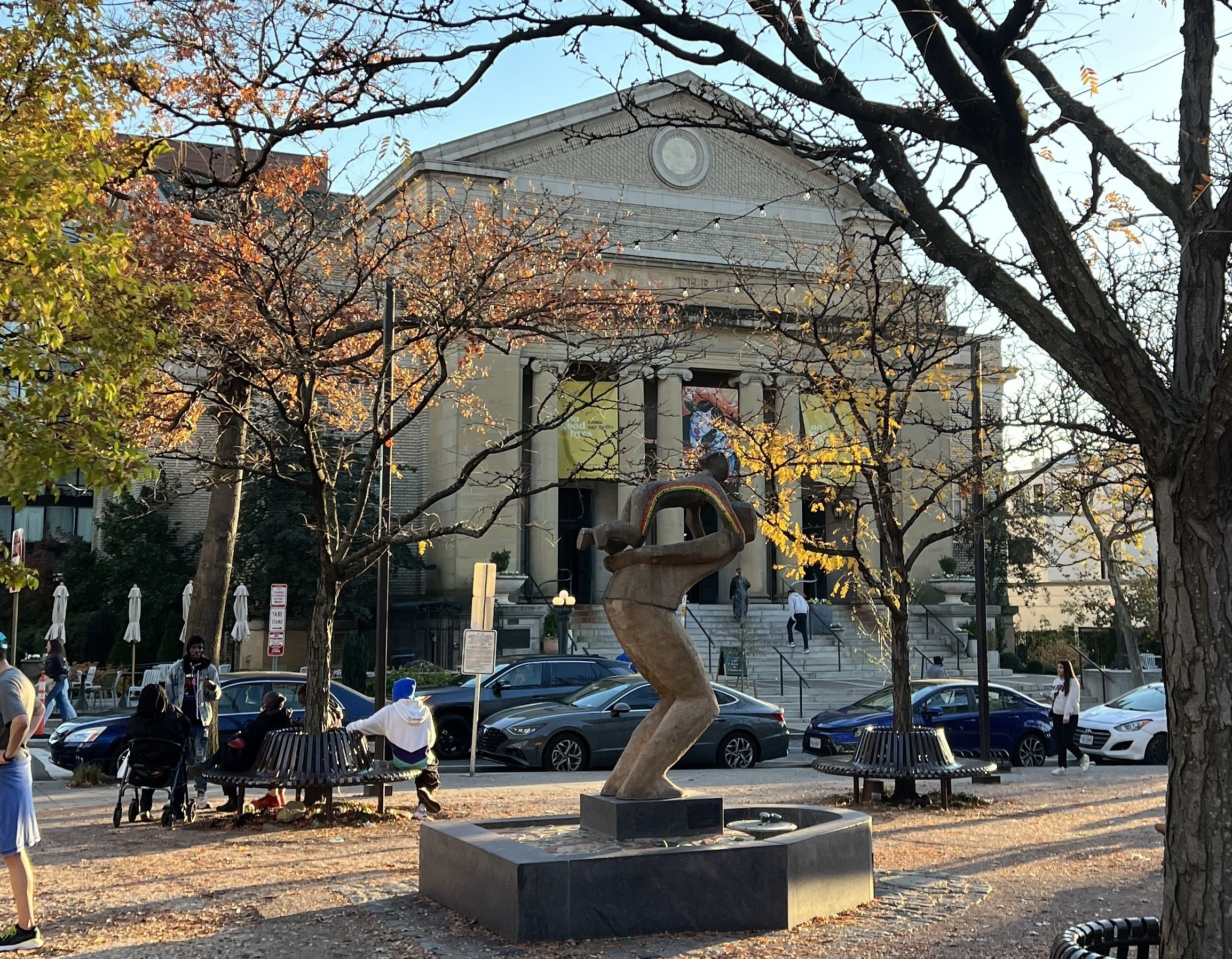
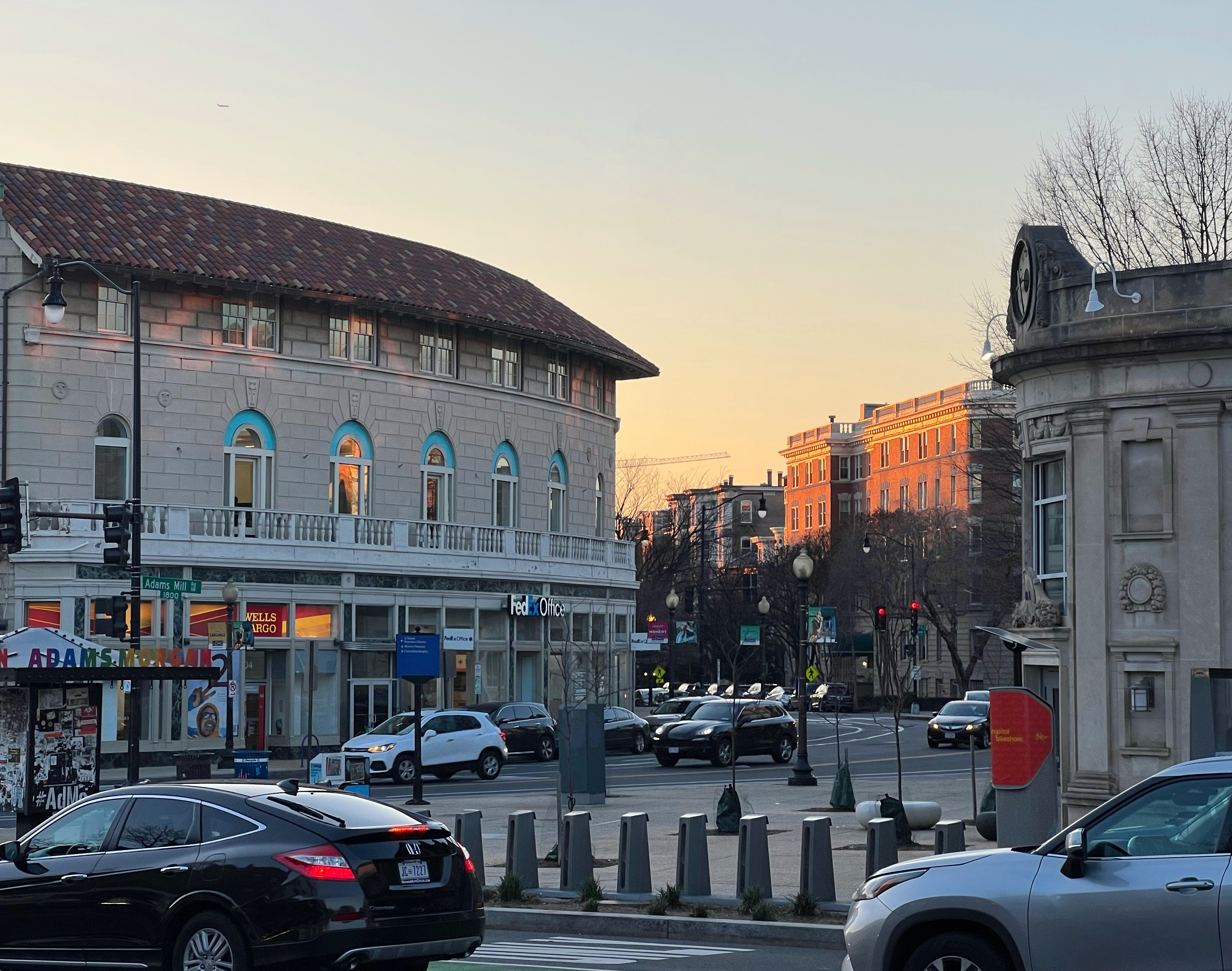
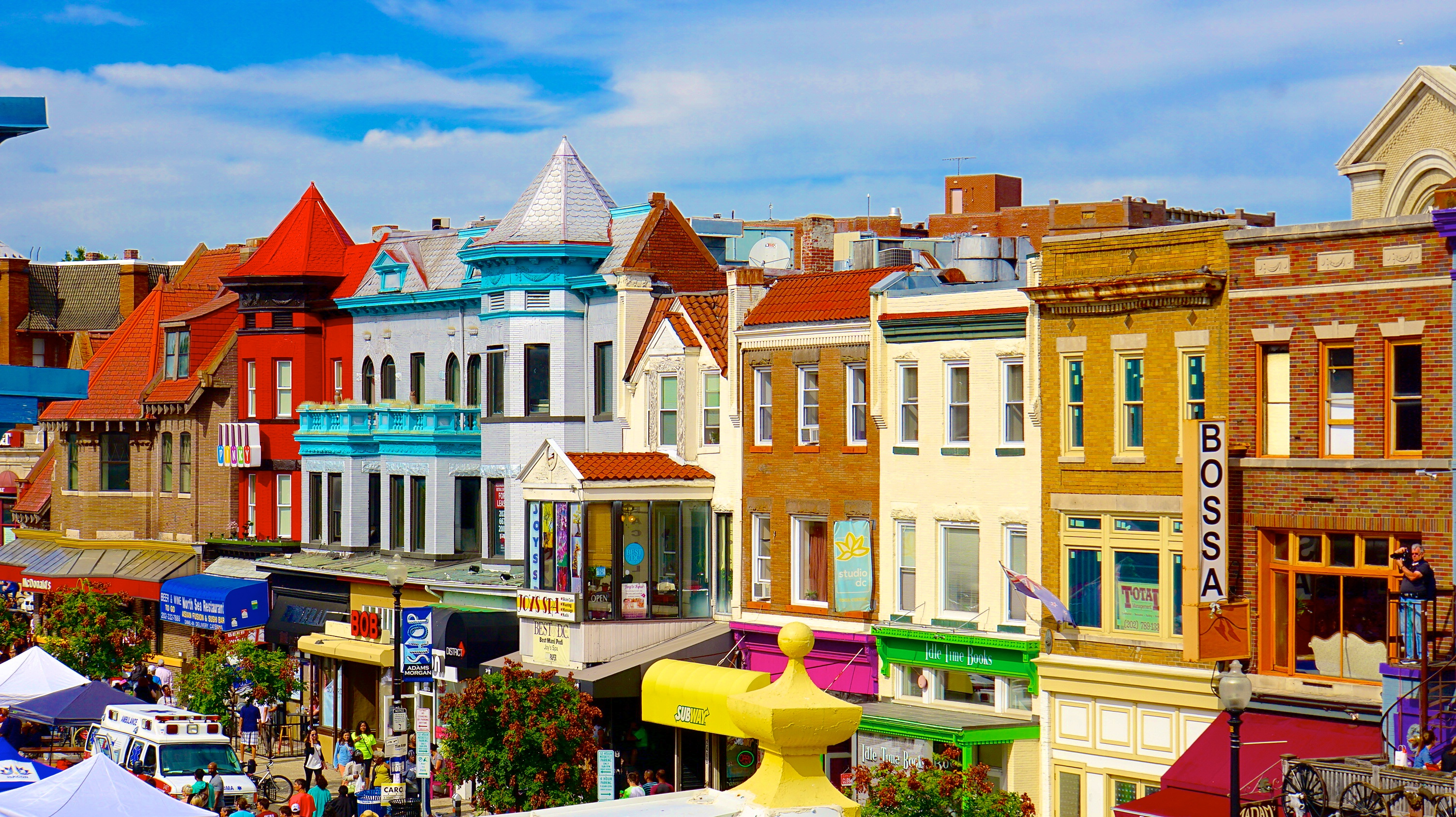
- Top: California Street (left) and 18th Street (right); middle: Unity Park (left) and Adams Morgan Plaza (right); bottom: Adams Morgan Day.

- Location of Adams Morgan in Washington, D.C.
- Country: United States
- District: Washington, D.C.
- Quadrant: Northwest
- Ward: 1

Government
  - Councilmember: Brianne Nadeau

Area
  - Total: 0.47 sq mi (1.2 km^{2})

Population (2020)
  - Total: 17,113
  - Density: 36,411/sq mi (14,058/km^{2})
- Postal code: ZIP Code

Adams Morgan (sometimes abbreviated as AdMo) is a neighborhood in Washington, D.C., located in the city's Northwest quadrant. Adams Morgan is noted as a historic hub for counterculture and as an arts district. It is also known for its popular entertainment district and culinary scene, centered on both 18th Street and Columbia Road.

In the 21st century, Adams Morgan has been a focus of urban redevelopment and become one of Washington's most gentrifying neighborhoods. Adams Morgan has also become one of the hubs of LGBTQ culture in Washington, D.C.

== History ==
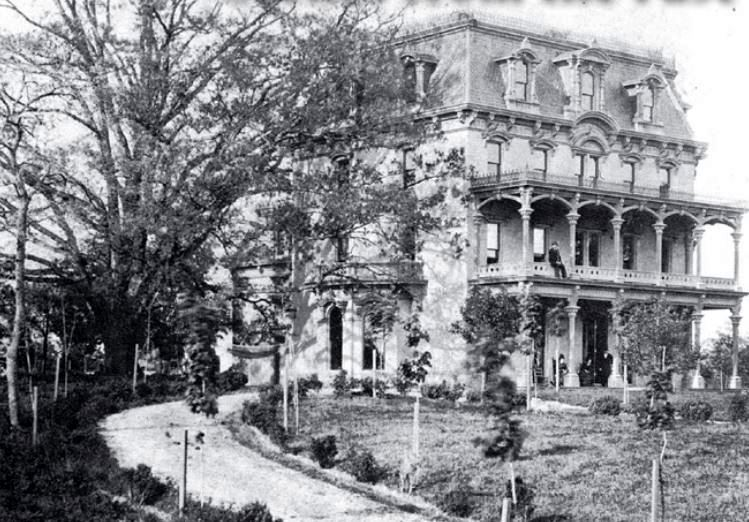
The Treaty Oak (left) and Oak Lawn mansion (right) in 1900.

When the District of Columbia was created in 1791, Robert Peter and Anthony Holmead, two prominent colonial-era landowners, held the land comprising modern-day Adams Morgan. At that time, these local tracts were north of the original planned City of Washington, and were either undeveloped or only lightly farmed. As the population of D.C. expanded, this land was divided into several estates purchased by wealthy residents, including Meridian Hill, Cliffbourne, Holt House, Oak Lawn, Henderson Castle, a part of Kalorama, and the horse farm of William Thornton.

After the American Civil War, these estates were subdivided and the area slowly grew. Once the city's overall-layout plans were finalized in the 1890s, these various subdivisions, using modern construction techniques, developed more rapidly, and the area of Adams Morgan then grew into several attractive and largely upper- and middle-class neighborhoods.

In the early 20th century, the area was home to a range of people, from the very wealthy living along 16th Street, to white-collar professionals in Lanier Heights, to blue-collar residents east of 18th Street NW.

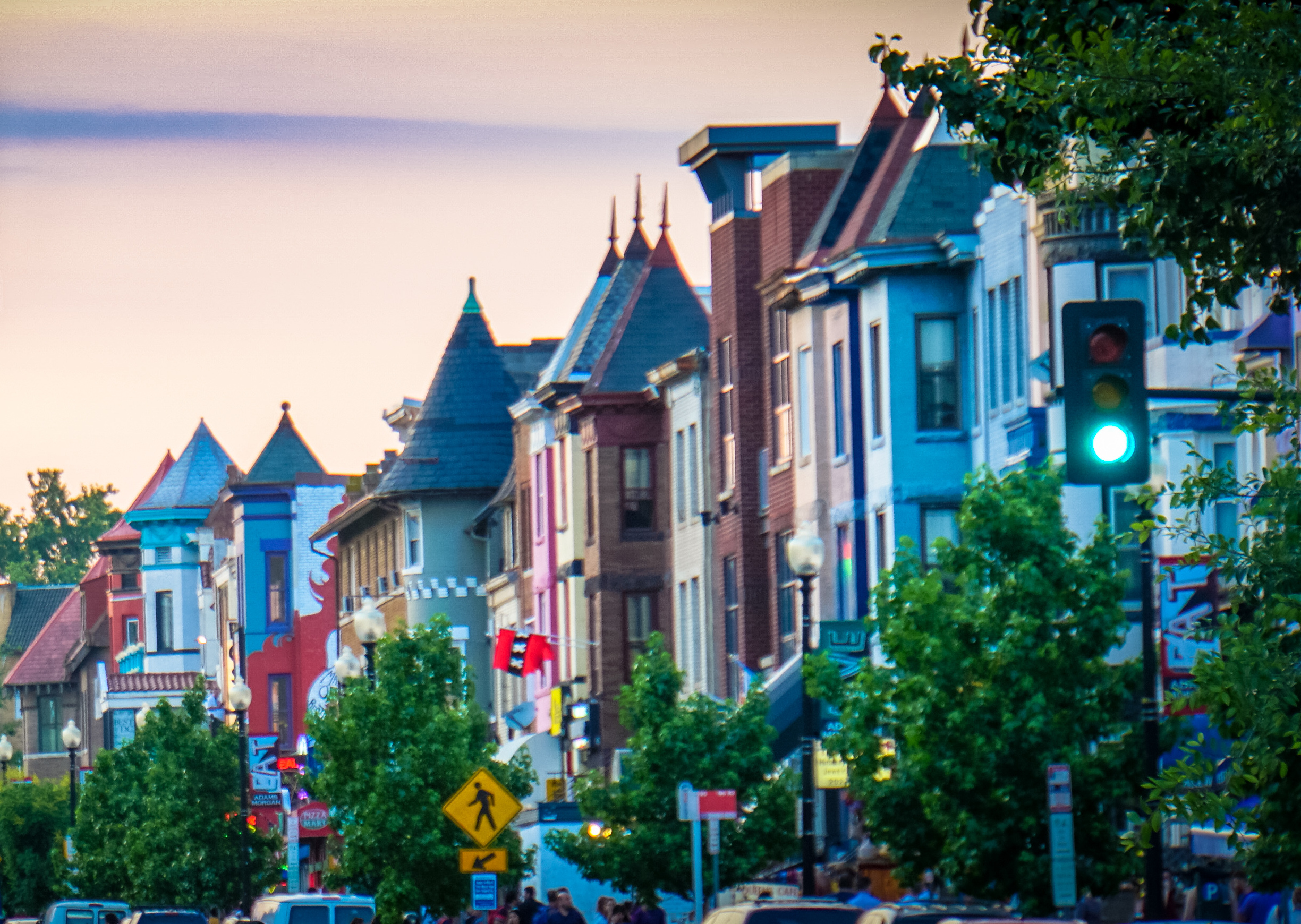
19th century Victorian rowhomes.

After World War II and Brown v. Board of Education, racial desegregation began. When D.C. was formally desegregated, some white people abruptly left the area, others stayed and worked to integrate the neighborhood, and some African American and Hispanic people moved into the area. With cheaper housing, the area also became home to some artists and social activists.

In 1948, Charles Lazarus founded Toys "R" Us in Adams Morgan.

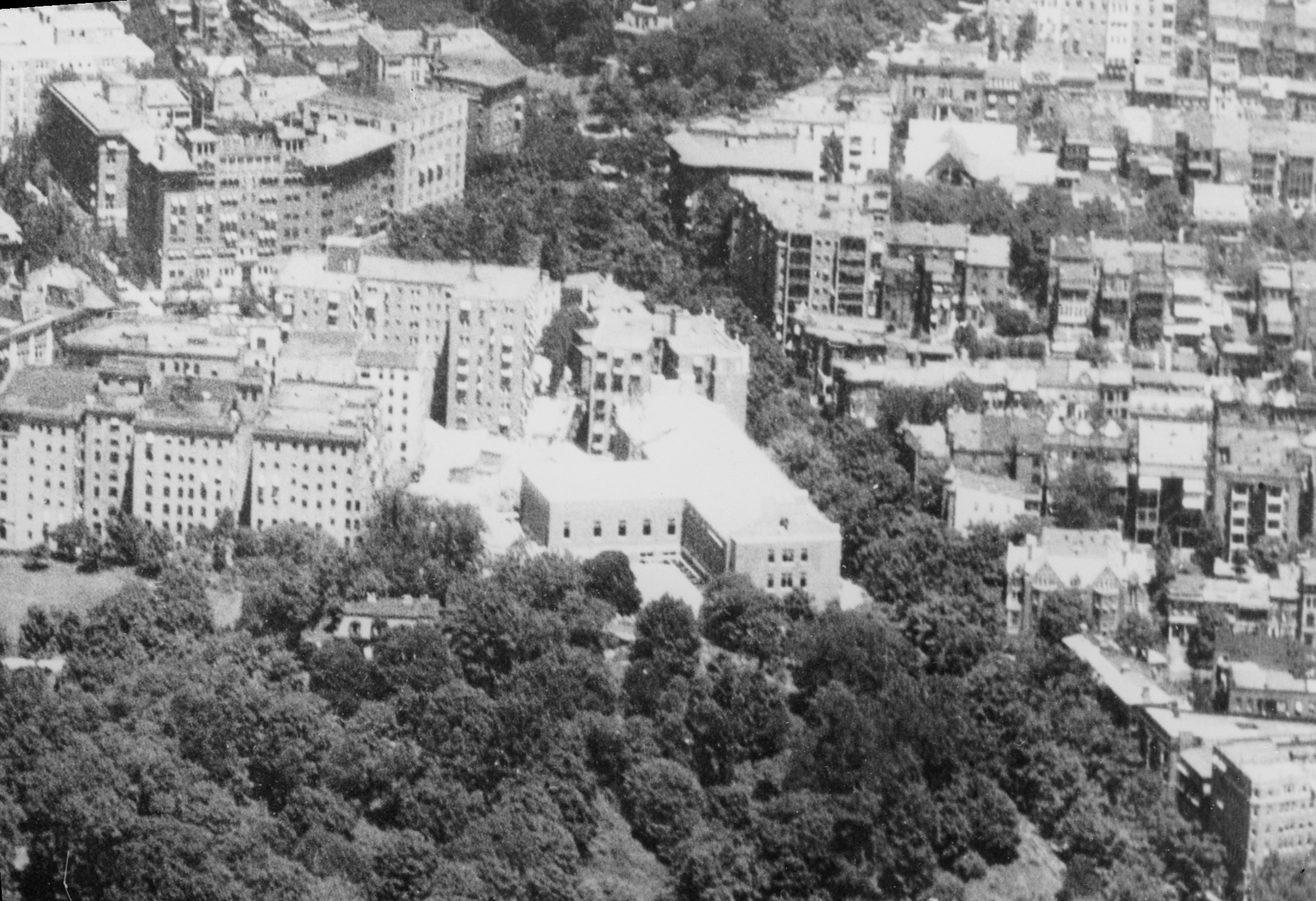
Aerial view of Adams Morgan and Kalorama in 1940.

In the early 1950s, before desegregation, the neighborhood was considered "ritzy." Pursuant to the 1954 Bolling v. Sharpe Supreme Court ruling, district schools were desegregated in 1955. The Adams-Morgan Community Council, comprising both Adams and Morgan schools and the neighborhoods they served, formed in 1958 to implement progressively this desegregation. The boundaries of the neighborhood were drawn through four existing neighborhoods—Washington Heights, Lanier Heights, Kalorama Triangle, and Meridian Hill—naming the resulting area after both schools.

In 1955, Herbert Haft founded Dart Drug in Adams Morgan.

In the late 1960s, a group of residents worked with city officials to plan and construct the Marie H. Reed Recreation Center, an elementary school and recreational complex, named after the minister and civic leader. In 1967, the Ambassador Theater opened; it closed in 1969.

After the 1968 Washington, D.C., riots, white flight continued. Neighbors banded together to form the Adams Morgan Organization to protect tenants and local parks from developers.

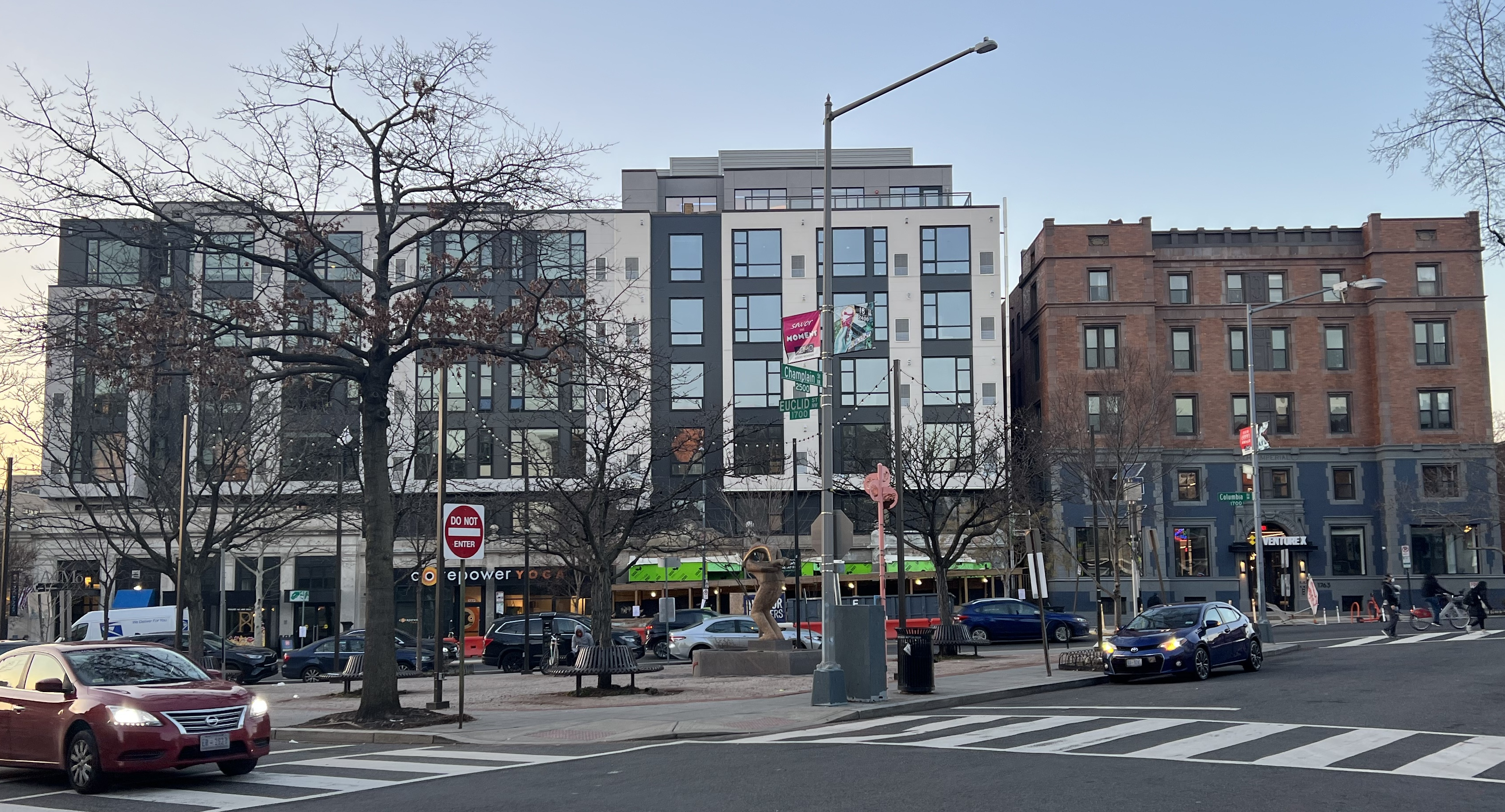
Unity Park hosts the Adams Morgan Farmer's Market every Saturday

In the 1980s, Hazel Williams operated Hazel's, which featured live blues and jazz, and its soul food offerings made it a favorite of Dizzy Gillespie and Muhammad Ali when they were in Washington, D.C.

The January 20, 2005 counter-inaugural protest included a march through Adams Morgan.

From 2010 to 2012, the city reconstructed 18th Street NW, one of the neighborhood's main commercial corridors, with wider sidewalks, more crosswalks and bicycle arrows, resulting in a more pedestrian-friendly thoroughfare. In September 2014, the American Planning Association named Adams Morgan one of the nation's "great neighborhoods," citing its intact Victorian rowhouses, murals, international diversity, and pedestrian- and cyclist-friendly streetscape. In 2021, many local businesses attempted to disband the local business improvement district. However, they were unsuccessful.

== Geography ==
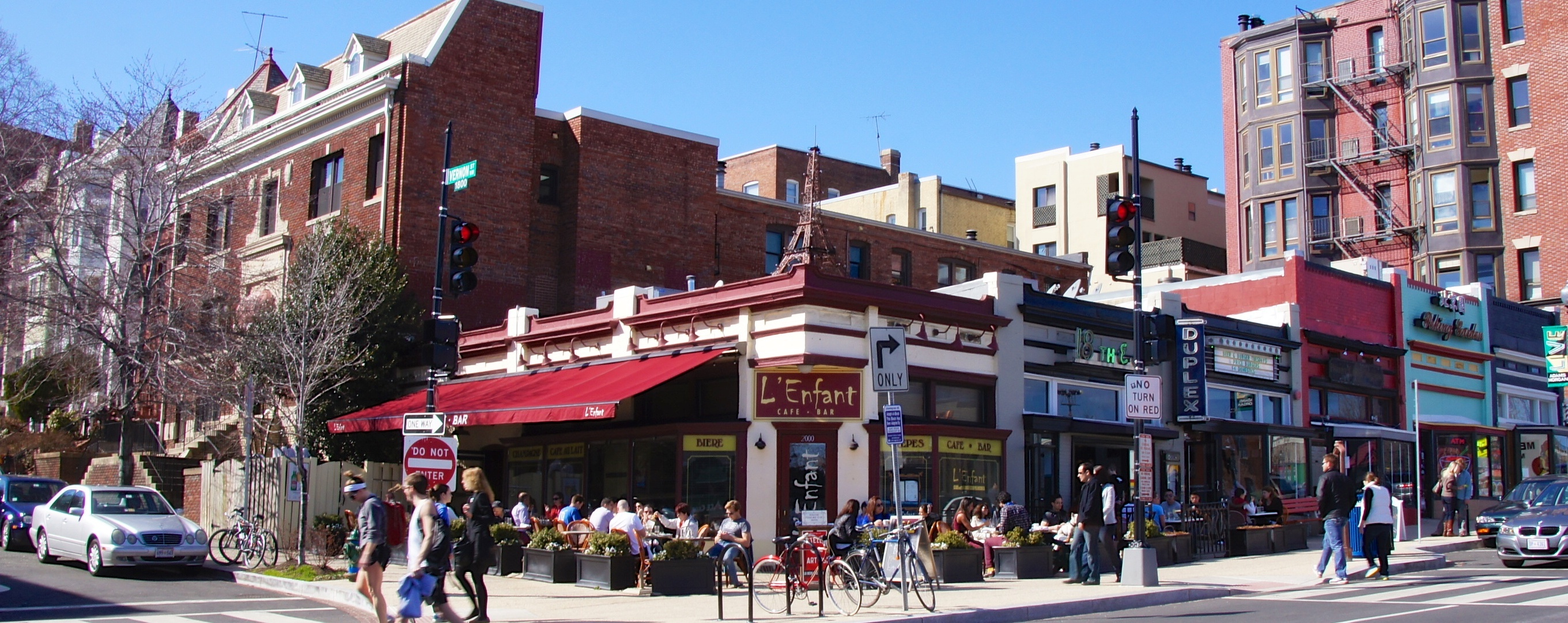
Restaurants and bars at the corner of Florida Avenue and 18th Street NW

The name Adams Morgan, once hyphenated, is derived from the names of two formerly segregated area elementary schools—the older, all-black Thomas P. Morgan Elementary School (now defunct) and the all-white John Quincy Adams Elementary School, which merged in 1955 following racial desegregation. The Morgan School was named after City Commissioner Thomas P. Morgan.

Adams Morgan is bounded:

- to the south by Florida Avenue NW and the Dupont Circle neighborhood
- to the southwest by the Duke Ellington Bridge and by Connecticut Avenue NW and Kalorama-Sheridan
- to the north by Harvard St. and Mount Pleasant
- to the east by 16th Street NW and Columbia Heights

Reed-Cooke is often considered to be a sub-neighborhood of Adams Morgan, consisting of the easternmost area between Columbia Road and Florida avenue, but it can also be considered to be part of the Meridian Hill neighborhood.

== Demographics ==
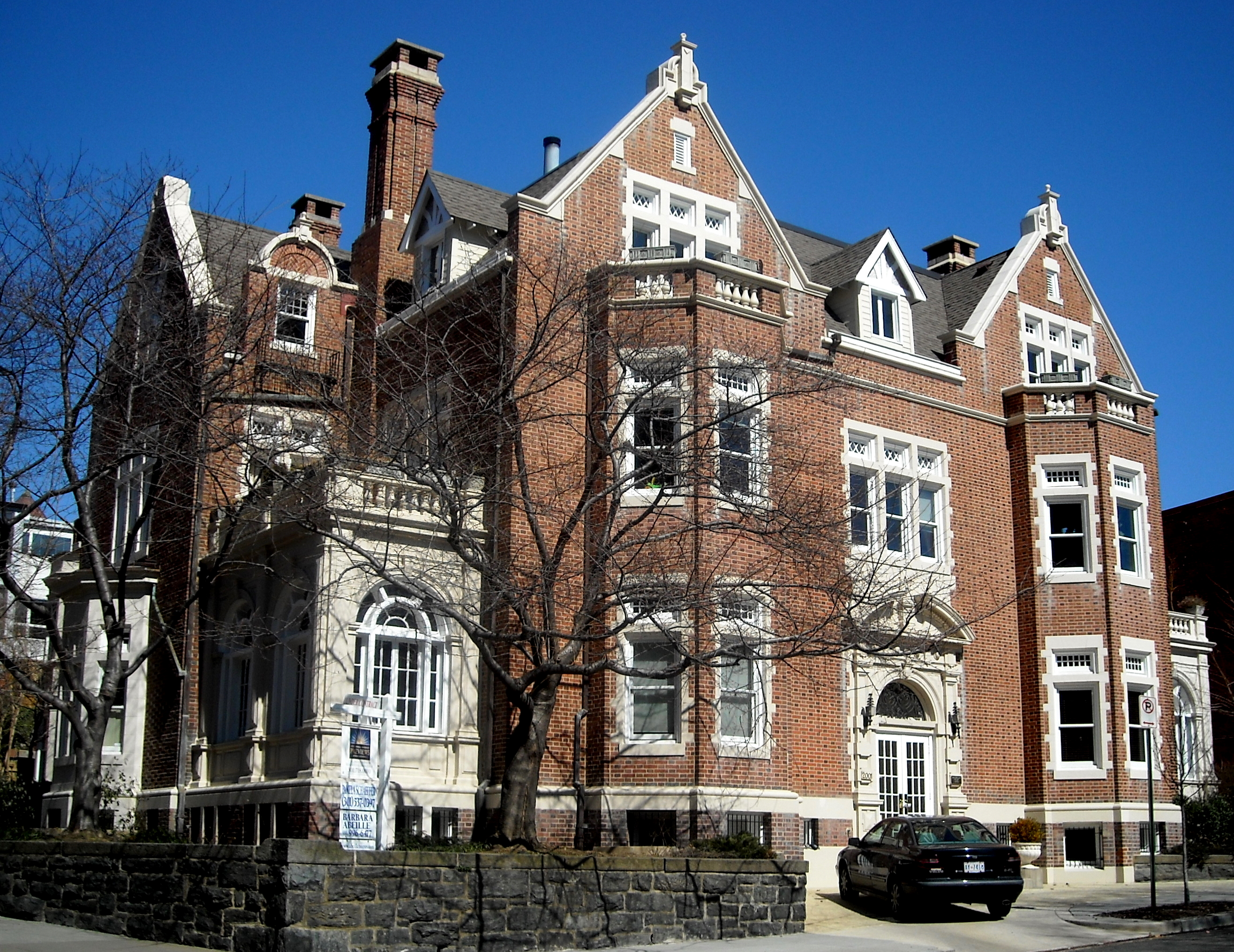
Old Chinese Embassy

Historical population
| Census | Pop. | Note | %± |
|---|---|---|---|
| 1950 | 21,000 | | — |
| 1960 | 18,097 | | −13.8% |
| 1970 | 18,573 | | 2.6% |
| 1980 | 15,352 | | −17.3% |
| 1990 | 15,061 | | −1.9% |
| 2000 | 14,803 | | −1.7% |
| 2010 | 15,830 | | 6.9% |
| 2020 | 17,113 | | 8.1% |

Along with neighboring Mount Pleasant and Columbia Heights, Adams Morgan long has been a gateway community for immigrants. Since the 1960s, the predominant international presence in both communities has been Latino, with the majority of immigrants coming from El Salvador, Guatemala and other Central American countries. It also has attracted immigrants from Africa, Asia and the Caribbean.

Since 1980, the population of the neighborhood increased marginally from 15,352 to 15,630, while average real annual household income more than doubled from $72,753 to $172,249 and the white non-Hispanic population increased from 51% to 68%.

== Economy ==
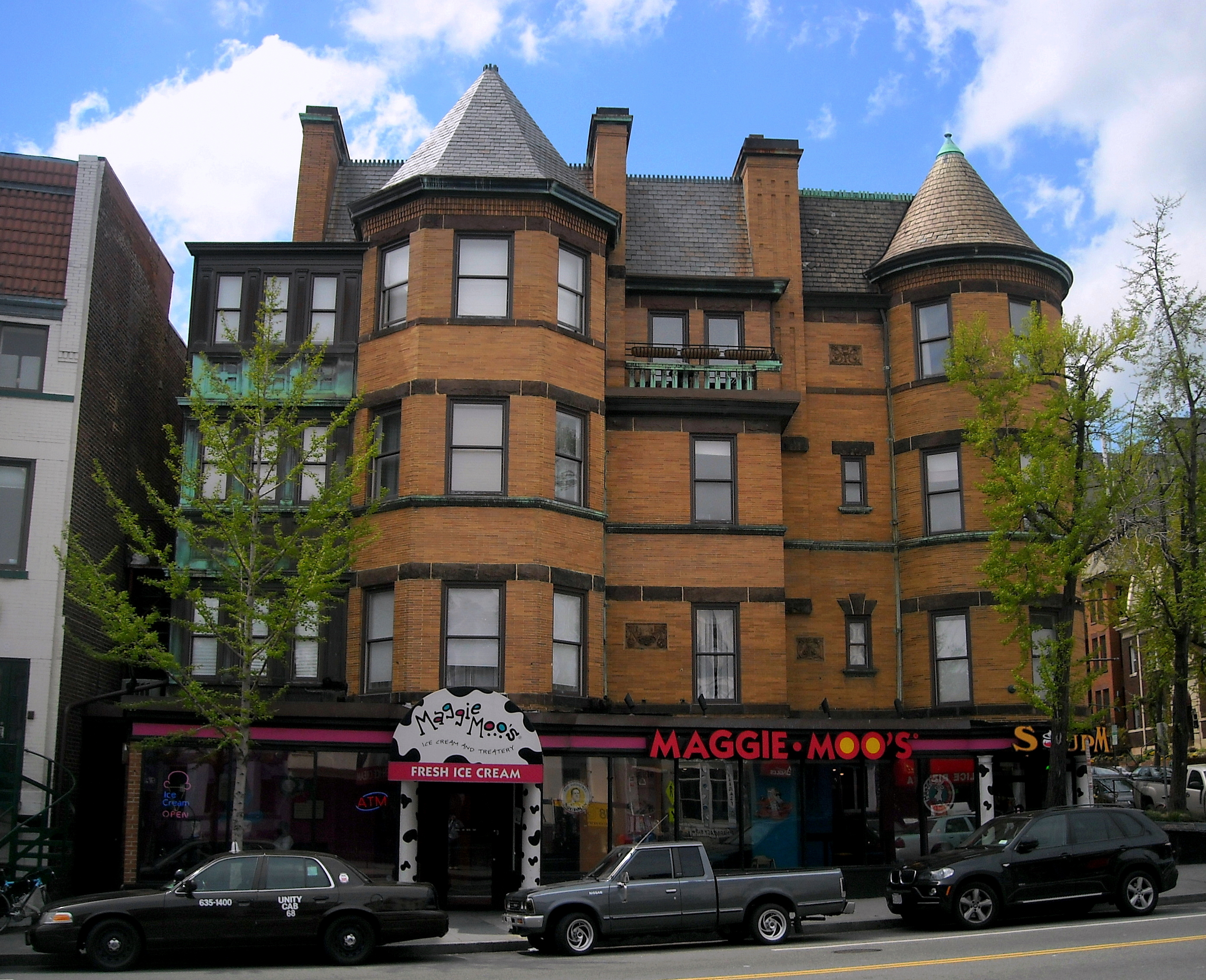
MaggieMoo's Ice Cream & Treatery

Adams Morgan is one of the most popular entertainment districts in Washington, known for its restaurants and bars. Approximately 100 establishments possess liquor licenses. A moratorium on new liquor licenses has been in effect since 2000.

The Adams Morgan Partnership Business Improvement District (AMPBID) has been active in the community since 2005; its stated mission is to promote a clean, friendly and safe Adams Morgan. It sponsors local events such as summer concerts and holiday decorations, and provides information to residents.

== Landmarks ==
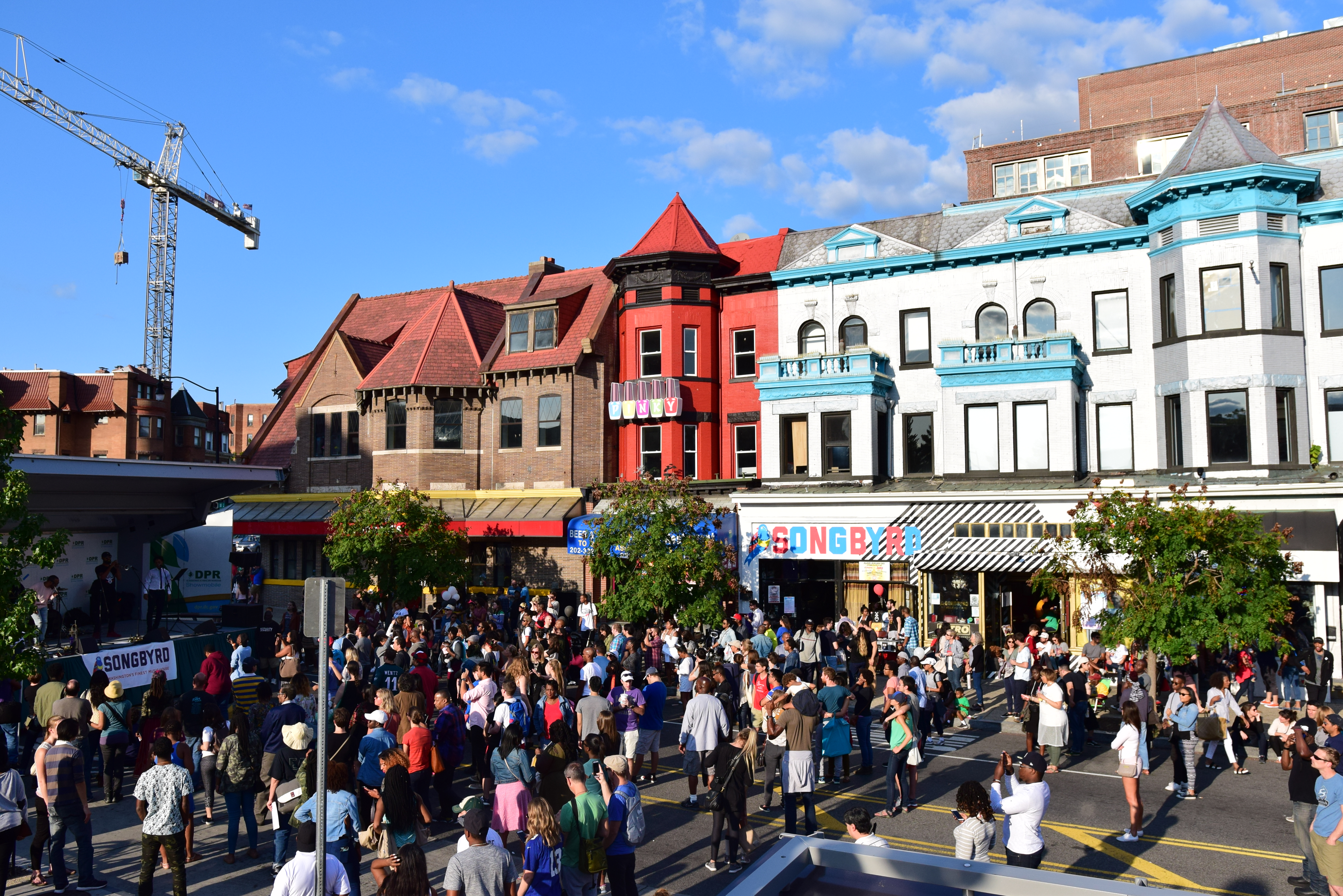
Adams Morgan Day celebrations

The Adams Morgan farmers' market operates, weather permitting, every Saturday from June to December.

The area is home to a number of diplomatic missions, including the Embassy of the Central African Republic and the Embassy of Gabon.

Local historic landmarks include the Fuller House and Euclid Apartments.

Examples of public artwork in Adams Morgan include Carry the Rainbow on Your Shoulders, The Servant Christ, and The Mama Ayesha's Restaurant Presidential Mural.

=== Adams Morgan Day ===
Adams Morgan Day is a multicultural street celebration with live music, food, and crafts booths.

== Transportation ==
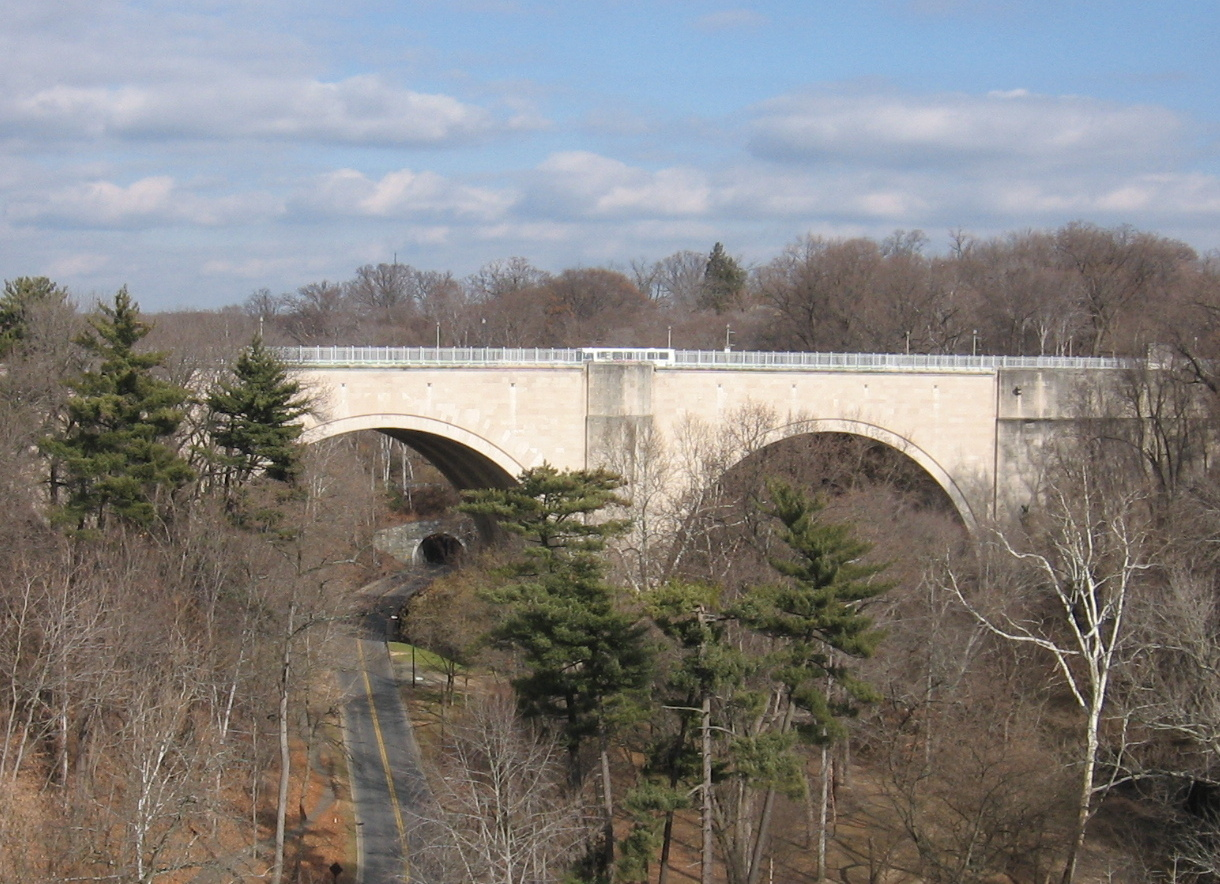
The Duke Ellington Bridge connects Adams Morgan to Woodley Park, over Rock Creek

Adams Morgan is not directly served by the Washington Metro system. The station nearest to Adams Morgan, Woodley Park station, is in the Woodley Park neighborhood, but was renamed "Woodley Park–Zoo/Adams Morgan" in 1999 to reflect the station's proximity to Adams Morgan. The station was renamed "Woodley Park" with "Zoo/Adams Morgan" as a subtitle in 2011.

The southernmost parts of the neighborhood near Rock Creek Park are closer to the Dupont Circle station, while the northeastern parts of the neighborhood are closer to the Columbia Heights station.

The Washington Metropolitan Area Transit Authority (WMATA) operated a DC Circulator bus route connecting the center of Adams Morgan with both Metro stations. The area is also served by several WMATA Metrobus lines, including the 42, 43, 90, 92, 96, H1, L2, S2, and S9.

== Education ==
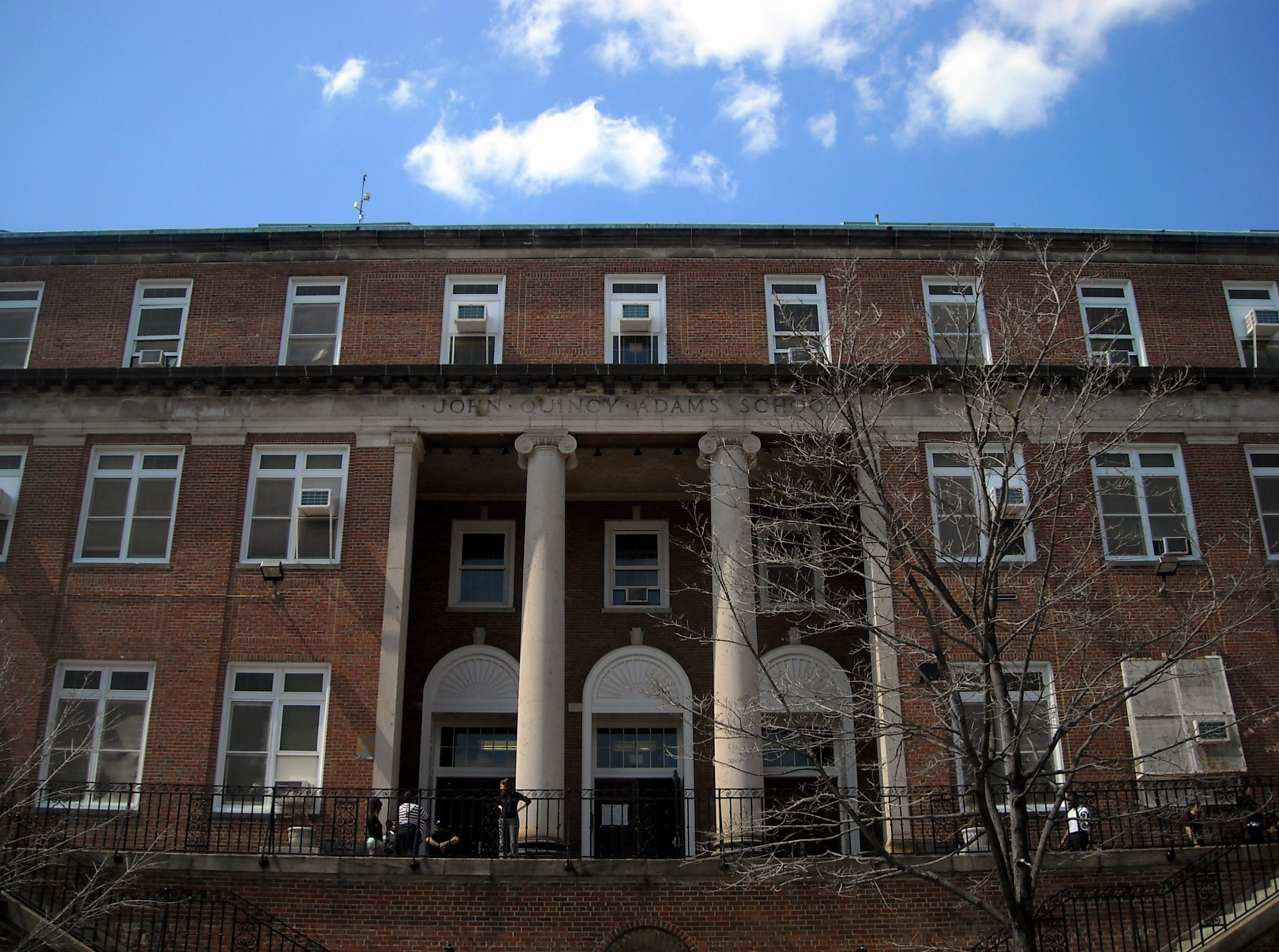
Oyster-Adams Bilingual School Adams Campus

The District of Columbia Public Schools is the public school system. Part of the neighborhood is assigned to Oyster-Adams Bilingual School (K-8), part is assigned to Marie Reed Elementary and Columbia Heights Education Campus, and part is assigned to H.D. Cooke Elementary and Columbia Heights Education Campus. The entire neighborhood is assigned to Jackson-Reed High School.

Oyster-Adams Bilingual, the neighborhood K-8 school, was formed in 2007 by the merger of John Quincy Adams Elementary School in Adams Morgan and James F. Oyster Bilingual Elementary School in Woodley Park. The Adams campus serves grades 4-8 and the Oyster campus serves grades Pre-Kindergarten through 3.

The Marie Reed Elementary School, with its Learning Center, built in 1977, was extensively remodeled and reopened in 2017.

H.D. Cooke Elementary School is at 2525 17th Street; it was renovated in 2009 as an environmentally friendly green building.

== Local politics ==
Adams Morgan is a part of Ward 1, and is in the service area of Advisory Neighborhood Commission 1C, the Adams Morgan Advisory Neighborhood Commission. The ANC covers the area between Harvard Street and Rock Creek to the north, Florida Avenue and U Street to the south, 16th Street NW to the east, and Connecticut Avenue to the west.

== In popular culture ==
Restaurants on 18th Street NW

Adams Morgan is where jumbo slice pizza was popularized. Jumbo slice is an oversized New York-style pizza. It is particularly popular as a late-night meal.

The neighborhood is also where the D.C. hardcore punk rock scene became popular, eventually spreading to other parts of the country and the world.

The Madam's Organ Blues Bar was described as a popular hangout by Playboy and Stuff, and was featured on the Wild On! travel series on E!.

=== Film and television ===
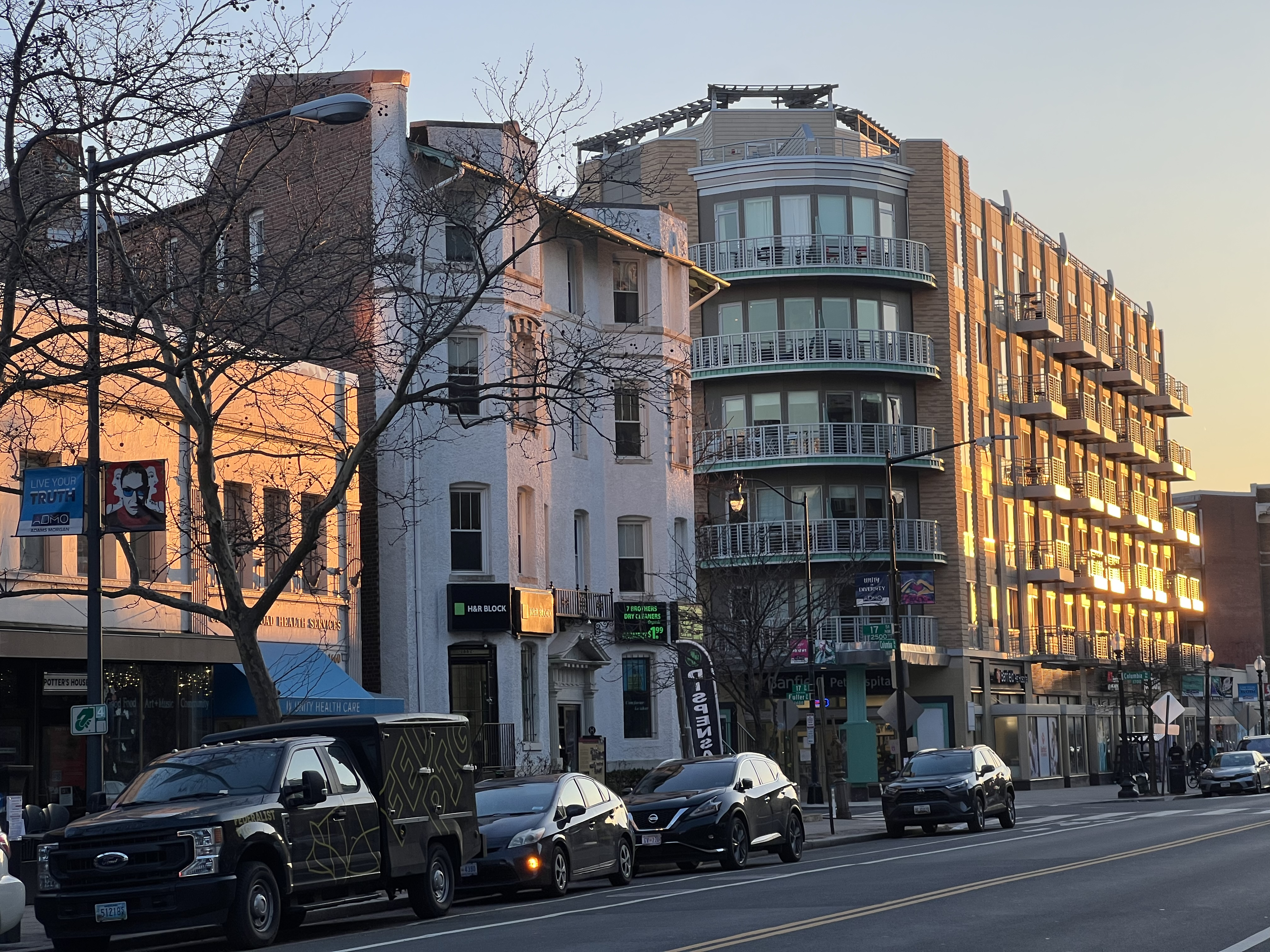
View down Columbia Road

The neighborhood's competing "jumbo slice" pizza establishments were covered in an episode of the Travel Channel's Food Wars.

In the Showtime Network series Homeland Season 3, Episode 4 ("Game On"), the main character Carrie Mathison states that she lives in Adams Morgan.

Scenes from the 2010 movie How Do You Know featuring Paul Rudd and Reese Witherspoon were filmed in Adams Morgan.

In the Netflix series Taken, the neighborhood is mentioned in Season 1, Episode 8, as the location where a car bomb explodes.

In the 1993 feature film In the Line of Fire, Secret Service Agent Frank Horrigan (Clint Eastwood) lives in Adams Morgan, likely at the corner of 18th St NW and Belmont Rd NW. The film features several locations in Washington, and Adams Morgan in particular.

== Notable residents ==
- Florence Augusta Merriam Bailey
- Vernon Orlando Bailey
- William Bankhead
- Carl Bernstein
- Gary Condit
- John L. DeWitt
- Dwight D. Eisenhower
- Mamie Eisenhower
- Nora Ephron
- Father's Children
- Thomas Gore
- Jim Graham
- Alexander Campbell King
- Jane Tunstall Lingo
- Josephine Diebitsch Peary
- Robert Peary
- Nora Pouillon
- Robert Maxwell Pringle
- José Ribalta
- Robert F. Rockwell
- Wendell Phillips Stafford
- Josiah Alexander Van Orsdel
- Paul Zukerberg
- Edgar George Brown
- Saagar Enjeti
- Rebecca Sugar

== See also ==
- List of restaurant districts and streets in the United States
- Architecture of Washington, D.C.
