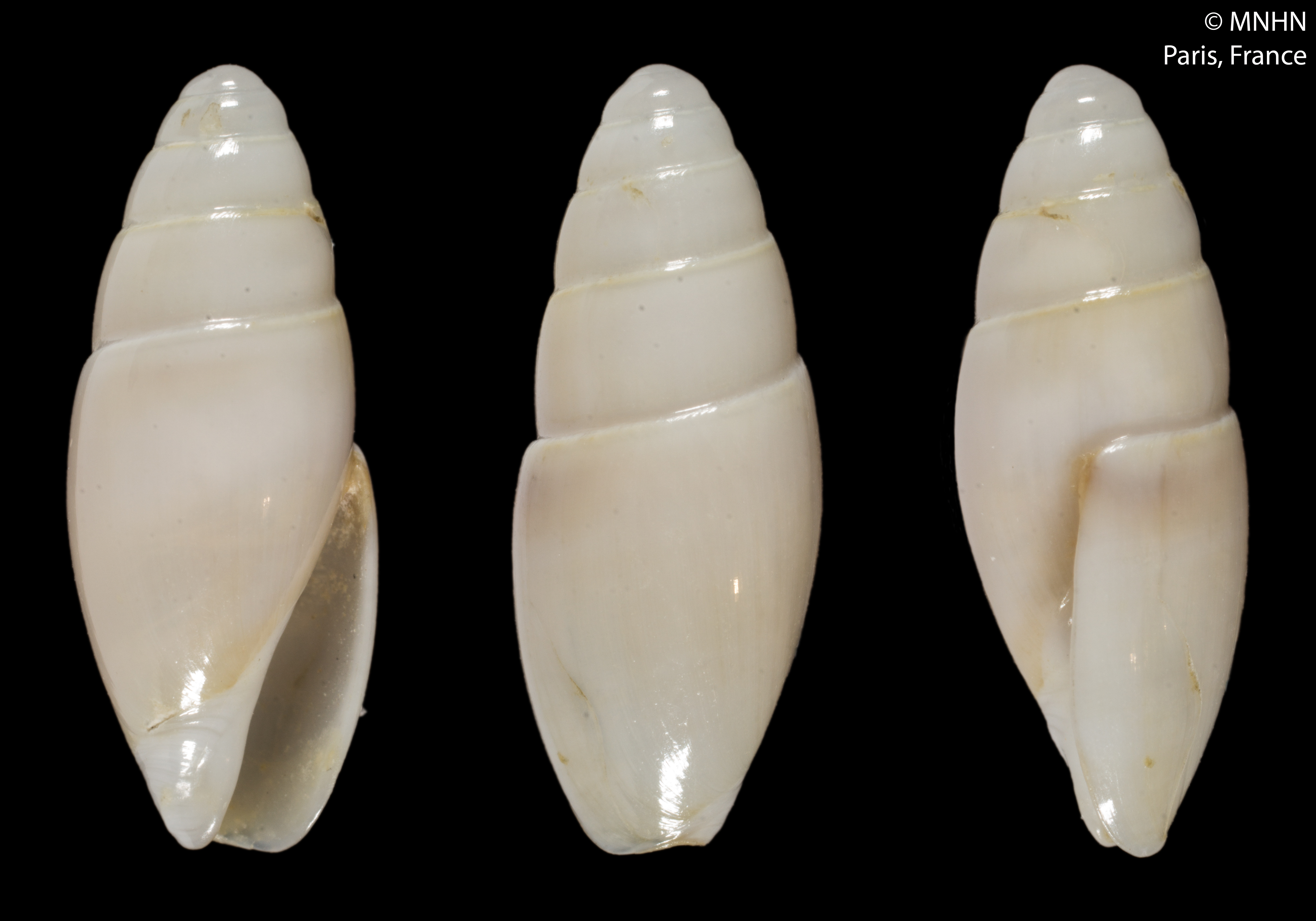
- Shell of Calyptoliva bolis (holotype at MNHN, Paris)

Scientific classification
- Kingdom: Animalia
- Phylum: Mollusca
- Class: Gastropoda
- Subclass: Caenogastropoda
- Order: Neogastropoda
- Family: Olividae
- Genus: Calyptoliva
- Species: C. bolis

Binomial name
- Calyptoliva bolis Kantor & Bouchet, 2007

= Calyptoliva bolis =

Species of gastropod

Calyptoliva bolis is a species of sea snail, a marine gastropod mollusk in the family Olividae, the olives.

== Distribution ==
This species occurs in the Coral Sea
