= Pizza Boli's =

American pizzeria chain

- Type: Private
- Industry: Pizza, pizza delivery
- Founded: 1985; 41 years ago Baltimore, Maryland, U.S.
- Founder: Javed "John" Nasir
- Headquarters: Pikesville, Maryland
- Number of locations: 87, as of November 2023
- Products: Pizza, chicken wings
- Website: www.pizzabolis.com

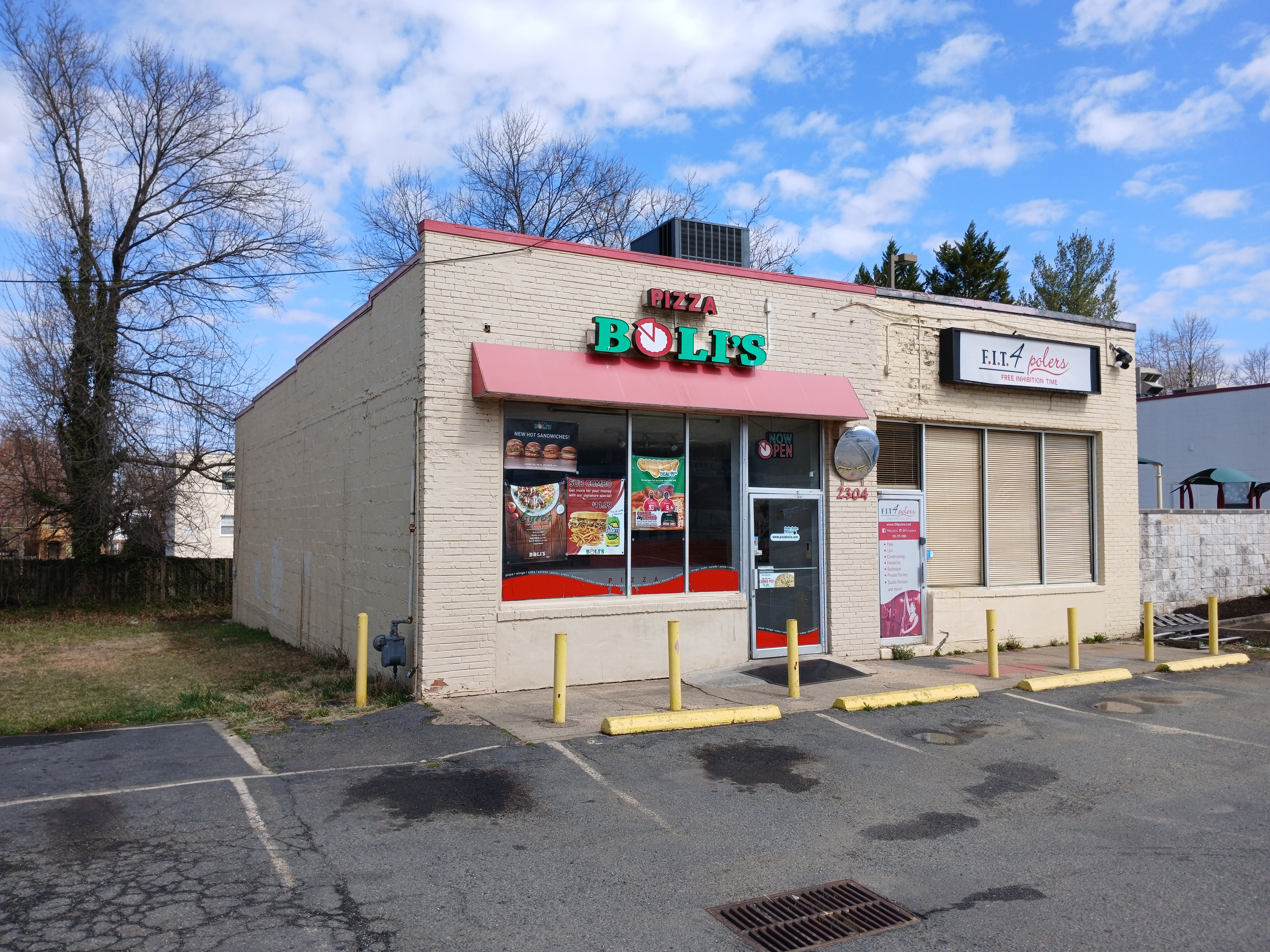
A Pizza Boli's franchise in Huntington, Virginia in March 2025

Pizza Boli's is a pizzeria restaurant chain in the Mid-Atlantic headquartered in Pikesville, Maryland. Their first pizzeria was opened in the Mount Washington neighborhood of Baltimore, Maryland, in 1985. By 2013, there were 70 restaurants in Maryland, Virginia, Pennsylvania, and Washington, D.C., and 80 restaurants by 2019.

== Recognition ==
In 2017, Pizza Boli's was rated No. 52 on the Pizza Today Top 100 Companies list with 2019 gross sales of $50,000,000 from its 80 restaurants. An outpost of the chain in the Adams-Morgan neighborhood of Washington, D.C., was a major purveyor of jumbo slices and participated in local disputes as to which restaurant served the most authentic slice to late-night revelers.
