= Holt House (Washington, D.C.) =

Historic house in Washington, D.C.

- U.S. National Register of Historic Places
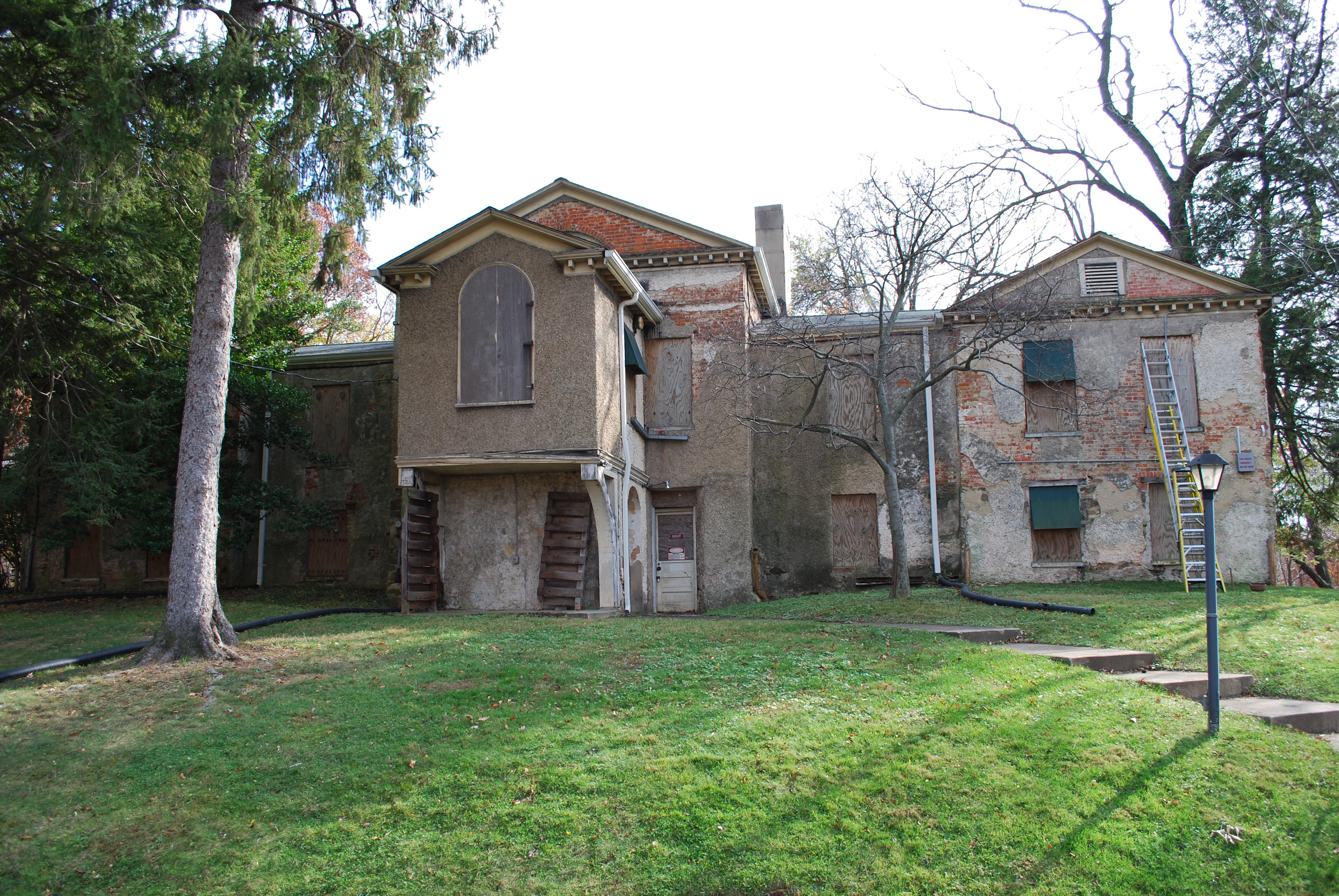

- Location within Washington, D.C.
- Location: Adams Mill Rd. in the National Zoological Park, Washington, D.C.
- Coordinates: 38°55′31″N 77°2′50″W
- Area: less than one acre
- Built: 1827
- Architectural style: Georgian
- NRHP reference No.: 73002090
- Added to NRHP: April 24, 1973

Holt House is a historic house on the grounds of the National Zoo in Washington, D.C.. Thought to have been built before 1814, it is one of the most important examples of early Neoclassical architecture in the city, and was one of the major houses in Washington, D.C., when it was built. Since 1889, its caretaker has been the Smithsonian Institution. It has been left vacant since the 1980s.

In 1964, Holt House was listed in the District of Columbia Inventory of Historic Sites and on the National Register of Historic Places on April 24, 1973 with the following National Register of Historic Places comment on it:

Holt House has a long history of being in a bad state of repair. Its present condition is bad, and it was in a deteriorated condition when purchased by the Smithsonian in 1890.

== History ==
Holt House is intimately linked to the early history of both Washington and the nation through its association with such prominent figures as Thomas Johnson (first governor of Maryland), Thomas Jefferson, Benjamin Stoddert (first Secretary of the Navy), Benjamin Mackall (Georgetown merchant), John Adams, John Quincy Adams, and Andrew Jackson. It has been owned by the Smithsonian Institution since 1890, and is the oldest building under its auspices.

While Holt House is one of the great country-style estates built during the early years of the new Federal City, it remains a mystery as to who built it and when. The chain of ownership and the backgrounds of the owners of the land on which the house sits suggest it could have been constructed no later than 1814. It seems most likely that the house was built by George Johnson, and if so, his connections to Dr. William Thornton, first Architect of the Capitol, suggest that Thornton may have a hand in the design of Holt House.

=== Benjamin Stoddert ===
The land on which Holt House sits was originally part of a tract of land acquired from the Beall family in 1793 by Benjamin Stoddert, builder of Halcyon House in Georgetown. Stoddert served as a captain in the Continental Army during the American Revolutionary War, Secretary of the Board of War (1779–1781), a merchant owner in Georgetown, co-founder and President of the Bank of Columbia (1794), and first Secretary of the Navy. It is likely that Stoddert built Columbia Mills on the property in the 1790s. Despite his prominent position, Stoddert's land speculation left him land rich and cash poor. Perhaps to help increase his cash flow, he constructed a flour mill on the land surrounding Holt House.

=== Walter Mackall ===
In December 1800, Stoddert sold the property, referred to as "Pretty Prospect" to his friend Walter Mackall. The deed included "the buildings, improvements, privileges, advantages and appurtenances." These "buildings" may be a reference to only the mill structures, but may also have included some form of a residence for a mill manager. Architectural evidence suggests that the west wing of Holt House may have been built earlier than the rest of the house and may have served as a small residence. If a house the present size of Holt House existed at this time, it would have been significant enough a structure to be mentioned separately in the deed.

Walter Mackall came from Calvert County, Maryland, served in the Maryland House of Delegates, and was a wealthy land holder in both Maryland and Washington. His brother, Benjamin Mackall, married Christina Beall, whose father Brooke Beall, was a wealthy shipping merchant in Georgetown, sending great quantities of grain and tobacco to England. When the government moved to Washington in 1800 and when William Thornton was serving as City Commissioner, Benjamin Mackall was one of those in charge of the transfer of the government books from Philadelphia. Benjamin may have become involved in the milling part of his father-in-law's business. To his daughter Christina, Beall gave a double square on Georgetown Heights, part of his vast landholdings known as the "Rock of Dumbarton," where they built Mackall Square.

Walter Mackall owned Pretty Prospect for only four years. He may have originally taken an interest in the mills due to his brother Benjamin's connection to the Beall family business. This was also a period of great land speculation in the new Federal City, and the time when large country-style houses were being constructed in Georgetown and on the outskirts of the City. Mackall may have built the present house or expanded a smaller, pre-existing house on speculation of increased resale value.

=== Jonathan Shoemaker ===
In 1804, Mackall sold the property, which consisted of the existent "mills, mill seats, way waters, buildings, and improvements" to Pennsylvania Quaker and miller Jonathan Shoemaker for $3,800 with an additional mortgage for a total cost $9,600. He arrived with his family of five sons and one daughter to operate the mills. While the deed acquired by Shoemaker now mentions the mills, it still does not refer to a house on the property. Problems at Columbia Mills and a dispute with Thomas Jefferson forced the Shoemakers to sell the property and relocate to Shadwell, Virginia to help operate Jefferson's mills there.

The Shoemakers were among the earliest Quaker settlers in the area and traveled far to attend meetings. As a former Quaker, Mrs. Roger Johnson may have known Jonathan and Elizabeth Shoemaker as they may have attended the same Quaker meetings in Indian Springs, Maryland. When the first Quaker Meeting was held in Georgetown in 1806, the Shoemakers may have made the acquaintance of architect William Thornton then, but sold the property only three years later.

The fact that Shoemaker took a mortgage to acquire the property and sold it for less than his original purchase price suggests that he was not in a financial position at this time to construct a larger manor house the size of Holt House, had it not already existed when he bought the property. Additionally, his Quaker beliefs would suggest a more modest lifestyle, as he relied on his family and not employees or slaves to run the mills, and would not have allowed for managing a house of this size as well. Ultimately, the Shoemaker family was prosperous, and Pierce Shoemaker returned to Washington and purchased what is known today as Peirce Mill on Rock Creek Park.

=== Roger Johnson ===
In 1809, Jonathan Shoemaker sold the property for $7,500 to Roger Johnson, of Frederick County, Maryland, the younger brother of Maryland's first governor, Thomas Johnson. This was an investment on Roger's part, as he already owned two foundries, a glass works, and a plantation in Frederick County and remained at his home "Bloomsbury" in Frederick County, while sending his son George to manage Columbia Mills.

Around 1809 or 1810, George Johnson is wed to Elizabeth Dunlop, daughter of wealthy Georgetown merchant James Dunlop, and the niece of Thomas Peter (the builder of Tudor Place and designed by Dr. William Thornton). There is evidence that George was married by 1810 and may have been living at the mill property by then, as Mrs. Dunlop (George's mother-in-law) sent three house slaves to her daughter in that year, which would probably not have occurred were they living with the Dunlops.

Beginning in 1812, George Johnson began borrowing large sums of money in order to rebuild the mills after they burned, employing a millwright to build "the best mill possible," and possibly may have used some of this money to construct a new house, or enlarge an existing house on the property as well. Perhaps the first reference to a "house" on the property appears in an 1818 letter from George Johnson to his father-in-law, James Dunlop. He was concerned that the house (which he refers to in the letter as "my house," "in town") would be attached with a lien due to his large debts, and was in hopes of renting it out. Possibly, George owned another house in Georgetown at that time as well. While "in town" in present-day terms generally refers to an urban center, because George Johnson is writing from Frederick, he may be referring to Washington in general. There have been no records discovered to-date that show any evidence of another residence for George Johnson other than Pretty Prospect. George's financial problems, beginning as early as 1814, suggest that he was not in a position to construct a large house after about 1812, due possibly in part to the financial impact of the British blockade of the Chesapeake Bay and the Potomac at that time.

In 1818, due to the extent of George's debts, Roger Johnson attempted to intervene on behalf of his son. Only two days after George's letter from Frederick, Roger also writes to James Dunlop. In his letter to Dunlop, he says that he hopes to sell his lot near the mill in the spring, then later to "sell the half of his Mil" (which he never did). Roger also asks James Dunlop to assume payment on half of George's debts, as he considered him partially responsible as the under signer of the loans. In his letter to Dunlop, Roger makes no separate reference to a house, only to the lot near the mill. But, according to Smithsonian records, a month before this letter was sent, Roger had already transferred the deed for the mill to the Bank of Columbia, with George's father-in-law, James Dunlop serving as trustee "to set up and sell at public sale for cash or upon credit" against George's debts, which totaled $28,161.55 with interest. The deed transfer encompassed "the Mill houses, dwelling houses, buildings, improvements." Roger maintained possession of 13 3/4 acres of Pretty Prospect, which later become the Holt House property.

It is uncertain who was paying on the mortgage between 1818 and 1823, but in fear of losing his home, in 1823 George approached his cousin Louisa Johnson Adams (wife of John Quincy Adams) in hopes that John Quincy would acquire the mortgage from the bank. Adams mortgaged his house in order to purchase the mill in 1823 for $20,000, and placed George on salary to continue to manage the mill, with the understanding that George would later buy back half the mills from Adams. Within months of purchasing the property, Adams became president.

Adams had hoped that the mills would be able to provide him some income and security in his retirement years. However, in 1823 his father (John Adams) wagered that demand would soar, and increased production. John Quincy watched as prices fell, costing him $15,000. Although never a successful business, the mill remained in the possession of the Adams' family until about 1872.

In 1824, George's arrangement with Adams to manage the mills was terminated by Adams due to George's inability to run them efficiently. In that same year, George once again approached Adams for assistance, soliciting a place as a Clerk in one of the Departments, to which John Quincy assured him he would "in no case recommend him." George may have continued to reside in the house until his brother finally sold the estate in 1835. Records show that by 1827, George was working as a clerk at 1st Comptroller's Office in Georgetown. There are no records to date to indicate another resident at Holt House between George's tenure there and the time it was sold in 1835.

=== Ashton Alexander ===
In 1831, Roger Johnson died, leaving the disposal of the 13 3/4 acres of Pretty Prospect to his sons, Joseph A. and Charles Johnson, requesting that "the house" and lot of land adjoining the Columbia Mills be sold to cover outstanding debts. It was not until 1835 that they sold the property to Dr. Ashton Alexander, a prominent physician from Baltimore, for whose family Alexandria, Virginia is named. Dr. Alexander never resided in Washington himself, and in 1838, rented the house to Amos Kendall, postmaster general of the United States, a close confidant of Andrew Jackson, and one of the founders of the modern Democratic Party. Kendall dubbed the house "Jackson Hill" in admiration of his friend, probably much to the chagrin of Jackson's political rival and adjacent property owner, John Quincy Adams.

Amos Kendall must not have been the best of tenants, as in 1841, Dr. Alexander placed an advertisement in the newspaper the National Intelligencer offering the property for lease or sale, declaring that “it has undergone three years of deterioration by the worst treatment by those who unfortunately tenanted. The proofs of which are grievously visible at a glance. And for the whole three years not a dollar, so far, has been received for damages or rent.”

=== Dr. Henry Holt ===
Dr. Henry Holt, a former U.S. Army assistant surgeon from Oswego County, New York, purchased the property in December 1844. Dr. Holt and his family finally sold the property to the commissioners for the National Zoological Park in 1889 for $40,000. By the time the Zoo purchased the property in 1889, Holt House was very dilapidated and badly in need of extensive repair. In helping plan the new zoological park, Frederick Law Olmsted, Jr. advised the park's planners to look to the graceful architecture of Holt House as a source of inspiration.

=== National Zoo ===
To meet the Zoo's needs for an administrative building and to stabilize the structure, there were so many changes made to the structure between 1890 and 1903, that much of the interior, historic fabric was lost. Despite its structural problems, however, the building has retained its distinctive character of a nineteenth-century country villa, which appeals to visitors. Zoo personnel occupied the building until 1988 after which it was boarded up, pending a future use. While the building is once again neglected, its purchase by the Zoo in 1889 probably helped ensure its survival over nearly 200 years.

Congress has limited spending on the house:

None of these funds in this or any other Act may be used for the Holt House located at the National Zoological Park in Washington, DC, unless identified as repairs to minimize water damage, monitor structure movement, or provide interim structural support.

== Architecture ==
Holt House is one of the few remaining "suburban villas" in Washington, D.C, a design concept by the 16th-century Italian architect, Andrea Palladio. As with Holt House, many designs modeled after Palladio's consist of five parts: a central or main block, flanked by a pair of symmetrical wings, connected to the main block by narrower hyphens and end pavilions or wings.

Holt House is in the "piano nobile" design style, with the upper or main floor of the house containing the formal rooms and family living quarters and the lower level or ground level usually functioning as a service area and cellar. The ground level of Holt House is thought originally to have had at least five rooms, less finely finished than the main floor and not a full story in height. The west wing had an interior stair that connected the lower floor with the upper floor, possibly connecting a ground level kitchen with an upper level dining area.

Due to the different methods of construction of the two wings, including an oversized external chimney and bricked-up door and window openings, the west wing may predate the rest of the house. It may have been used as a residence for earlier owners of the mill, or used as the main family dwelling as the other parts of the house were completed, as was the custom in the 18th century. This was the sequence of construction at Tudor Place, designed by Dr. William Thornton, first Architect of the United States Capitol, the Custis-Lee Mansion, known as Arlington House, and Kalorama, designed by Benjamin Latrobe.

Holt House was built of load bearing masonry walls, primarily of brick but intermingled with local stones and rocks. The exterior of the masonry was covered with a white limed based stucco, with a smooth finish and possibly scored to resemble ashlar; similar to the exterior finish of Tudor Place.

The central block and matching wings on Holt House have gabled roofs with pedimented façades that are articulated with equally spaced modillions. The modillions are rectangular blocks or brackets used horizontally in a way that appears to support the roof above. The pediment of the central block, on the north and south elevations, was accentuated with a semi-circular window.

Originally the north entrance served as the main entrance to the house and the entrance hall, accessed by a stairway from the ground level to the main level's open porch. Beneath the porch was an enclosed space accessed on both the east and west elevations through arched openings. Both arches remain today.

The south side of the house was accessible via a door on the ground level, and on the main level by a pair of matching spiral staircases. The paired spiral stairs were unique to this area but not extraordinary in Palladio's designs. The grand room on the main level opened to a porch with flat, parapeted flat roof. The main level entrances on both the north and south sides of the central block were three panel double-doors with glazed sidelight sashes.

A significant architectural feature of Holt House's design was the use of Wyatt windows in the south elevation. These tripartite sash windows, with a center sash of six over nine, were a design popularized by the English architect, James Wyatt in the 18th century. The Wyatt window is similar to a Serliana or Palladian window, but without a center-arched glazed section. Wyatt windows are found in many houses in the Washington vicinity at the turn of the 19th century.

== Pictures ==
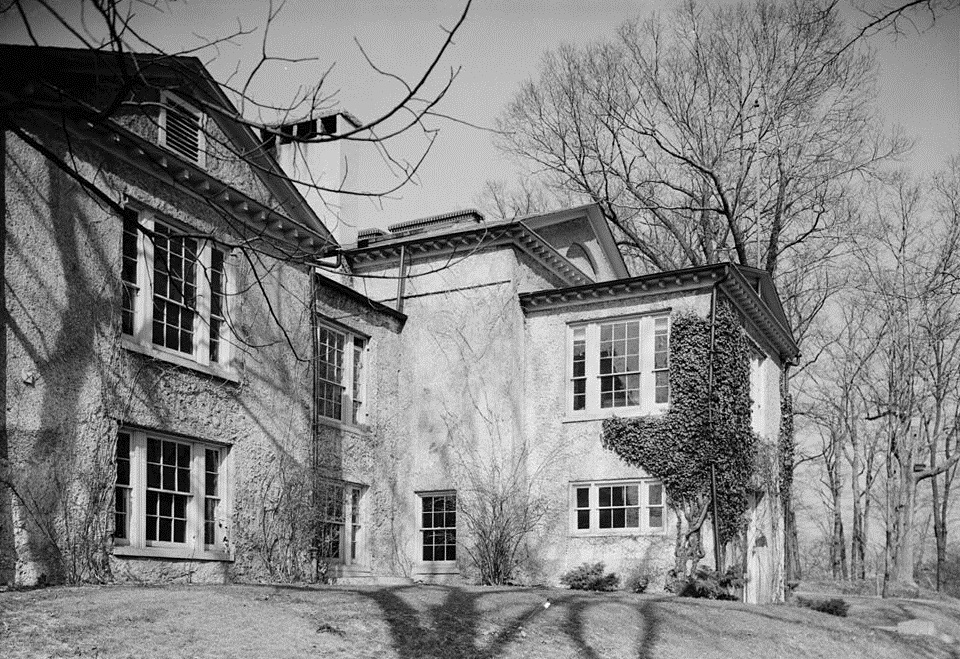
Front 1937

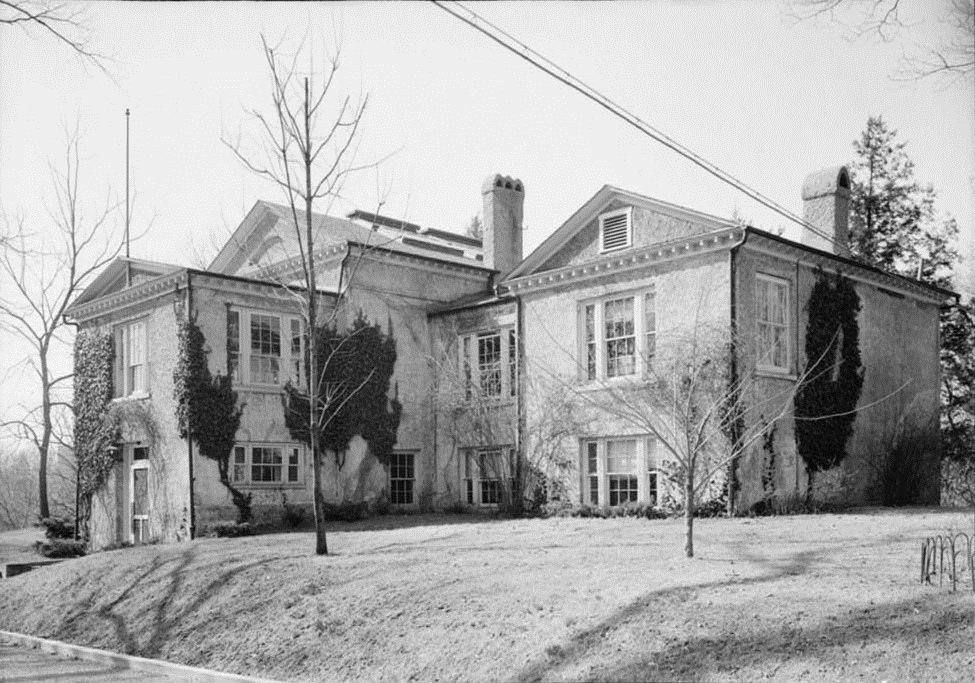
Front 1937

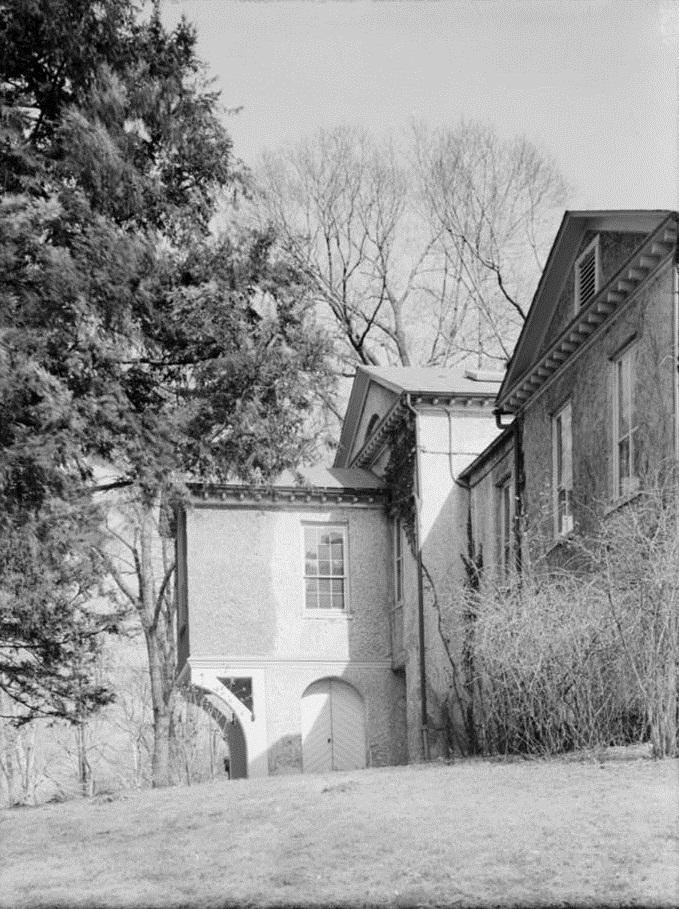
Rear 1937

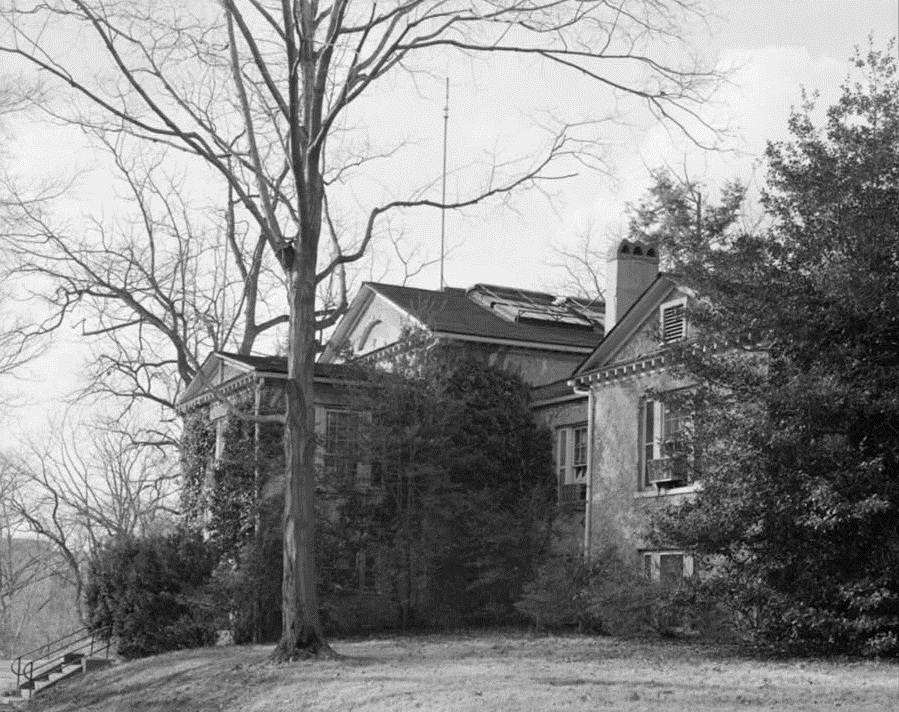

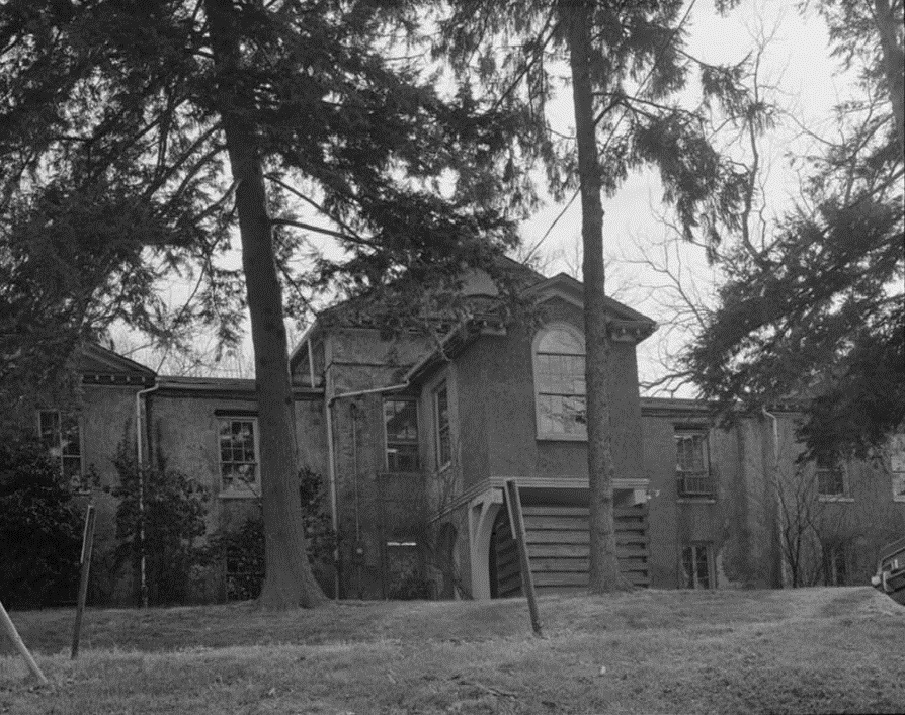
