= Oak Lawn (Washington, D.C.) =

Former large estate replaced by modern buildings

Coordinates: 38.916275°N 77.044703°W

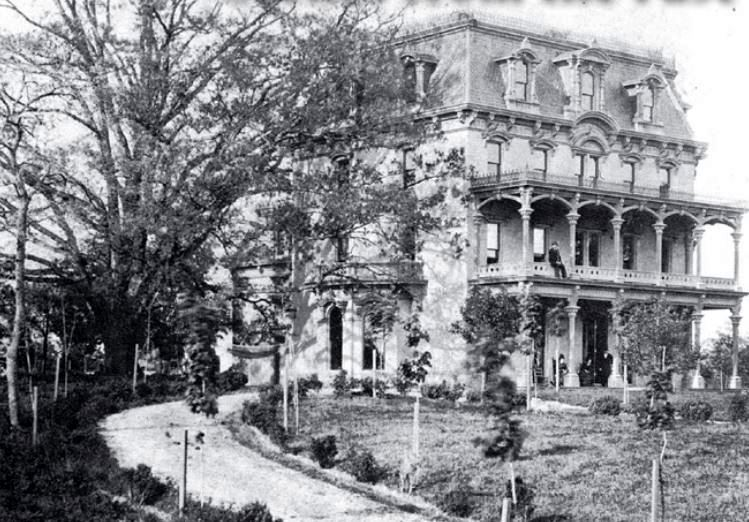
The Oak Lawn house and Treaty Oak, as viewed from the Florida Avenue driveway, around 1900.

Oak Lawn (later known as the Dean Estate, Temple Heights, and Temple Hill) was a large house and wooded estate that once stood on the edge of today's Dupont Circle and Adams Morgan neighborhoods in Washington, D.C. The estate was bounded by 19th Street, Columbia Road, Connecticut Avenue, and Florida Avenue. Previously called Widow's Mite, the estate was originally several hundred acres, but by the 19th century, had been reduced to around 10 acres (4 ha). The house was built around 1820 and was greatly expanded in 1873 by Thomas P. Morgan, one half of the eponym of the Adams Morgan neighborhood. A large oak tree, nicknamed the Treaty Oak, was reportedly hundreds of years old and stood just a few yards from the house.

Oak Lawn was located on a hill. Due to its expansive views of the city, the estate was sought after by local developers. The surrounding neighborhoods evolved into bustling residential and commercial areas. However, Oak Lawn remained a wooded, undeveloped tract until the 20th century. In 1922, the land was sold to a Masonic group who wanted to build a temple complex, but canceled their plans due to a lack of funds and the Great Depression. In 1940, a local developer hired Frank Lloyd Wright to design a massive mixed-use project there (Crystal Heights) that would include 14 towers and a hotel: that project was also canceled. During the next 20 years, multiple plans for Oak Lawn never came to fulfillment. The Oak Lawn house was demolished in 1948, and the Treaty Oak cut down in 1953. In the late 1950s and early 1960s, the Washington Hilton and two commercial buildings were built on the property that had been home to the old estate.

== History ==
=== 17th–19th centuries ===
The land where Oak Lawn stood was originally called Widow's Mite. The first known owner was a man named James Langworth from Charles County, Maryland, who acquired the property on August 18, 1660. Family members of his son, William, later sold the 600-acre (243 ha) land inheritance containing Widow's Mite to John Bowling. His family sold the land to Thomas Fletchell after Bowling's death. Fletchell's son, also named Thomas, inherited the land, and it was later sold to Anthony Holmead on July 8, 1725. (Note: Sources cited at Holmead's Burying Ground give the date of Holmead's purchase as 1718 or 1726) At the time Widow's Mite was said to be shaped like a parallelogram with its boundaries extending from around north of the Old Naval Observatory to present-day Florida Avenue, 17th Street, and Rock Creek Park.

The Holmead family owned the land for several decades and by the time the City of Washington was laid out, Widow's Mite was only a 16-acre (6.5 ha) estate. Holmead sold the property to Colonel Michael Nourse, chief clerk at the Treasury Department, who built the Federal-style estate house around 1820. Due to complaints from his children and the long commute to work, Nourse sold the property in 1835. It was later acquired by businessman and politician Thomas P. Morgan, who served as superintendent of police and city commissioner and indirectly became half the namesake of the Adams Morgan neighborhood.

When Morgan bought the estate in 1866, it was around 10 acres (4 ha) and was bounded by present-day 19th Street, Columbia Road, Connecticut Avenue, and Florida Avenue. The surrounding area was still largely undeveloped. Holmead's Burying Ground was just to the south and on nearby present-day California Street there was a training area for soldiers. In 1873 Morgan greatly expanded the house into a large and impressive four-story Second Empire-style building which included a large wing in the rear. Morgan renamed the property Oak Lawn due to the large oak tree that stood a few yards from his house. The tree, nicknamed Treaty Oak, was estimated to be a few hundred years old at the time. There were legends about the tree, the most well known being it was the site of a treaty between early settlers and members of the local Nacotchtank tribe.

One year after his new house was complete, Morgan sold Oak Lawn to Edward C. Dean, a businessman who served as president of the Potomac Terra Cotta Company. The property was also called Dean's Estate after he acquired it. After he died in 1899, Dean's widow, Amanda, continued to live on the estate.

=== 20th–21st centuries ===
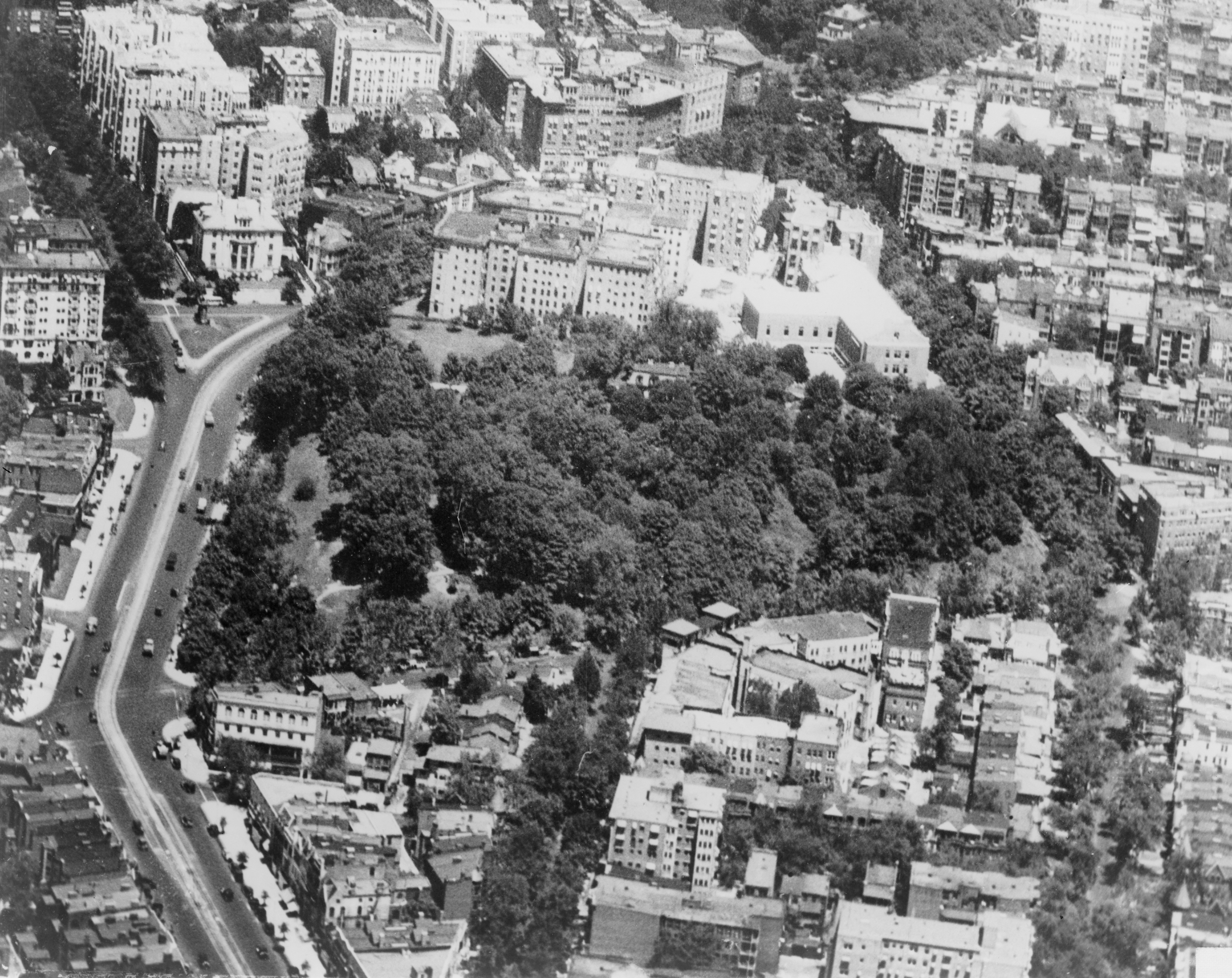
In the first half of the 20th century Oak Lawn was a wooded area wedged between heavily developed neighborhoods.

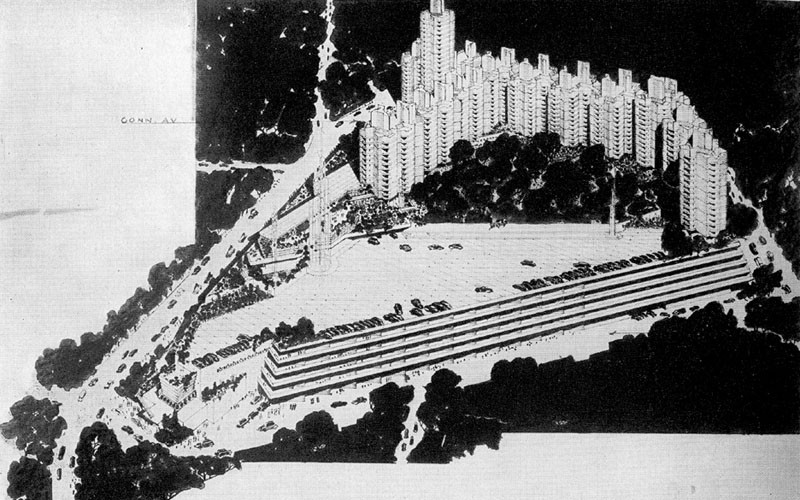
Frank Lloyd Wright's 1940 design of the unbuilt Crystal Heights project

By the early 1900s, the Dupont Circle and Adams Morgan neighborhoods were highly developed areas with commercial properties and large apartment buildings lining Connecticut Avenue and rows of middle and upper-class houses on the surrounding streets. In 1921, the Woman's National Foundation sought to buy the property and build a clubhouse there, but they were unsuccessful.

For several years, a Masonic group had been looking for a site to build a temple complex. The group purchased Oak Lawn in 1922 for $900,000 (about $13.2 million in 2024), and the property was nicknamed Temple Heights or Temple Hill for many years. Architects James R. Marshall and Frank G. Pierson were hired to design the $3,000,000 complex ($44.1 million in 2024), which was to include a central tower, neoclassical temples, and an auditorium seating 3,000 people. Each building in the complex was meant to represent a Masonic organization, including the Scottish Rite, Royal Arch Masonry, and Knights Templar. The Masons began a fundraising campaign that lasted until the 1929 stock market crash and start of the Great Depression. The group had announced construction was to begin on the first building in October 1929 after having raised $2,000,000 ($28.7 million in 2024). However, due to the economic downturn, the plan was canceled. The property mostly remained untouched for the next decade, except for an occasional meeting of the Order of the Eastern Star in the Oak Lawn house.

Congress considered purchasing part of the estate in 1936 to turn into a public park. Over $300,000 ($5.32 million in 2024) was offered for 109,964 square feet (10,216 square metres; 3 acres; 1 hectare) of land at the corner of Connecticut Avenue and Florida Avenue, but the offer was turned down. In August 1940, the wooded estate, described as "the last great undeveloped piece of property close to the center of the downtown area", was purchased by a syndicate led by developer Roy C. Thurman, despite continued calls for the land to become a public park. Thurman hired noted architect Frank Lloyd Wright to design a $12,000,000 mixed-use project ($210 million in 2024) that was unlike any development ever built in the country.

The U-shaped project, which was similar in size and scope to the large Watergate complex built years later, was called Crystal Heights and later Crystal City. It was to include over a dozen 14-story towers made of white marble, glass, and bronze and a 24-story central tower. Eleven of the fifteen towers would house a 2,500-room hotel, with around half of its rooms designed with working fireplaces. The remaining four towers would house duplex apartments that shared a similar design to another one of Wright's unbuilt projects, St. Mark's-in-the-Bouwerie Towers in New York City. In addition to the towers, Crystal Heights was to include a 1,000-seat theater, large shopping center, fountains, and gardens, and Wright promised the Treaty Oak would not be removed. Taking advantage of the gradual slope of the property's terrain, five parking levels for 1,500 cars were to be built along Florida Avenue. On top of the parking structure would be a large terrace. Wright described his project as Usonian and said, "Versailles won't look like much when it is finished." The Crystal Heights project was later cancelled due to local zoning laws regulating building height and a lack of funding after World War II began.

In 1945 the Cafritz Construction Company and Charles H. Tompkins Company purchased the property for $1,000,000 ($13.8 million in 2024), and announced plans to construct eight buildings on the site that would serve as a hotel and apartments. The architectural firm of E. Burton Corning and Raymond G. Moore was chosen to design the $2,500,000 project ($34.4 million in 2024). In addition to the hotel and apartments, plans included a sunken garden, nursery school, gymnasium, pool, and dining areas. Around the same time Kansas Senator Arthur Capper and California Representative Edouard Izac introduced legislation in Congress that would allocate $900,000 ($12.4 million in 2024) to purchase Oak Lawn. The legislation would provide funds for a memorial honoring Union soldiers that served during the Civil War. Both plans for the site were criticized by locals who sought to preserve the wooded area and local officials objected to losing property tax revenue if the memorial was built.

The following year new plans were made that included a hotel on the northern end of the Oak Lawn estate and a commercial building with offices, a theater, parking garage, and retail space on the southern end. The $20,000,000 project ($245 million in 2024) required approval from local officials to reclassify the southern end from residential to commercial. There was also the requirement to widen Florida Avenue, creating a T Street extension that would connect 19th Street and Connecticut Avenue and build retaining walls. Plans for the project later changed, and in 1948, it was announced that a large shopping center, movie theater, and retail space would be built on the site. In preparation for the construction of this project, in April 1948, the Oak Lawn house was demolished by the General Wrecking Company. When the house was demolished, it was described as containing expensive mahogany woodwork, ornate fireplaces, gas light fixtures, and a 1,000-US-gallon (3,800 L; 830 imp gal) water tank on the third floor. The lumber, bricks, and fixtures were later sold.

Later that month, a new plan was announced for the estate, which included building a parking lot for 450 vehicles on the property. The chairman of the District Motor Vehicle Parking Agency said the site would be the first of the city's planned "fringe" parking lots designed to alleviate traffic problems. A bus scheduled to depart the parking lot every six to ten minutes would take commuters to their destinations downtown. But by September 1948 that plan was put on hold after local residents, including occupants of the adjoining Wyoming Apartments, protested the project.

In 1949 the Cafritz and Tompkins companies offered the United Nations' Food and Agriculture Organization 35,000 square feet (3,252 m^{2}) of land, valued at $350,000 ($3.65 million in 2024), for the agency to build their headquarters on the site. The agency was offered the site for free as long as they started to build their headquarters at some point the following year. That offer was rejected and plans for a parking lot were revived by 1952.

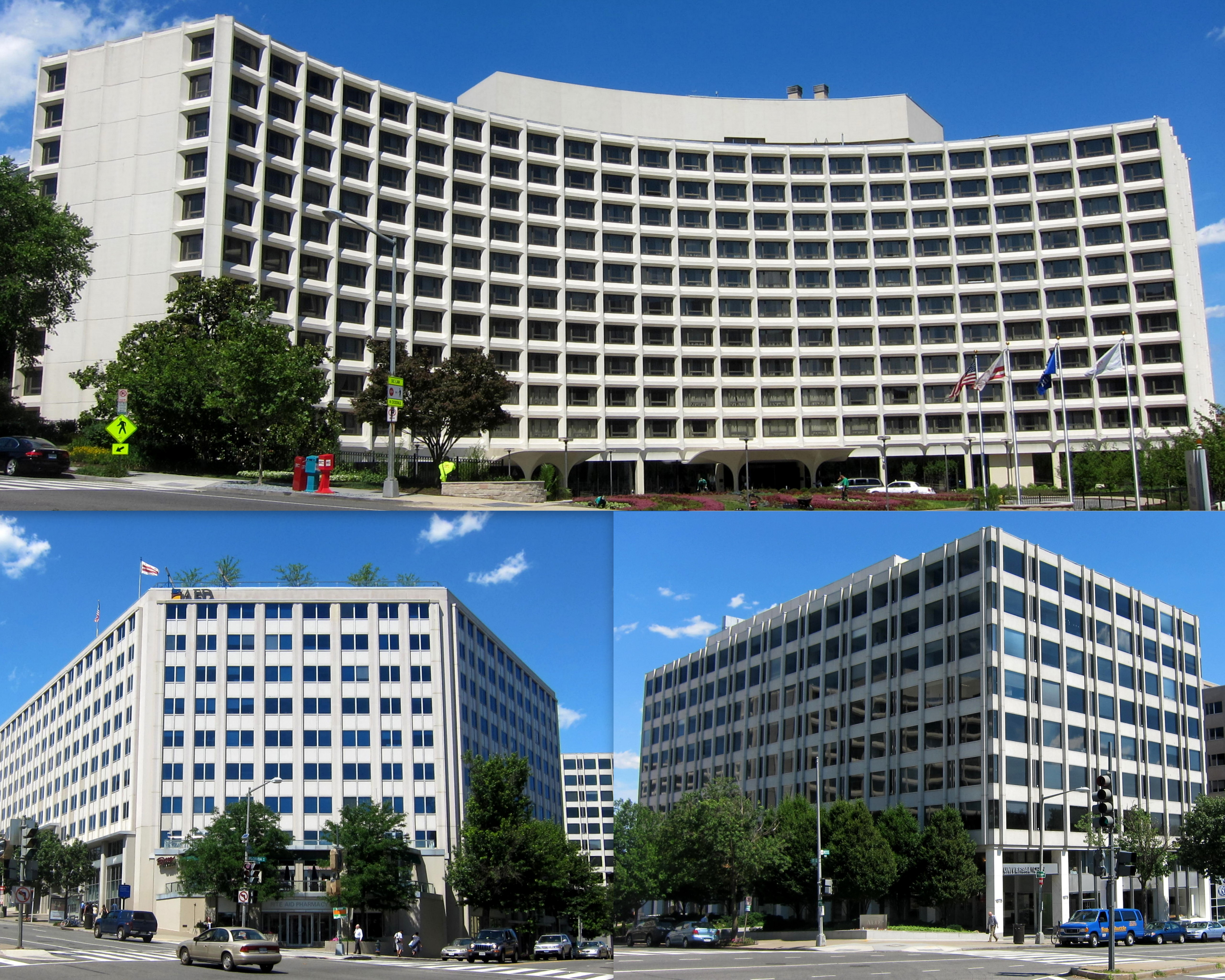
The Washington Hilton, Universal South Building, and Universal North Building, built between 1956 and 1965.

In 1952 the companies announced plans for a twelve-story office building to be constructed on a one-acre (0.4 ha) portion of the property at the corner of Connecticut and Florida Avenues. The architect chosen for the project, Leroy L. Werner, had designed a "park at your desk" office building at 1625 I Street NW which featured an indoor parking ramp, gradually rising inside the structure. The new building was to be designed similarly and include around 600 parking spaces. Cafritz and Tompkins also planned on constructing an additional office building and hotel. At the time, the previous 10-acre (4 ha) site had been reduced to around 7.5 acres (3 ha) after T Street was extended through the property. While preparing the site for construction, the remaining trees on Oak Lawn, including the Treaty Oak which was estimated to be 350–400 years old and was decaying, were felled.

By 1956 a new design for the $8,000,000 office building ($70.5 million in 2024) was announced. Named the Universal Building (later the Universal South Building), Werner designed it to include the "park at your desk" layout with parking spaces for around 500 vehicles and commercial space on the second floor. Construction of the Universal Building began later that year. Cafritz and Tompkins also announced the remaining portion of the Oak Lawn site would be developed as part of a $25 million project ($220 million in 2024), to include a $15 million ($132 million in 2024) 1,000-room hotel on the hill overlooking the city, a large parking garage for hotel guests, and two $5 million ($44.1 million in 2024) office buildings.

The Oak Lawn property was sold to Percy Uris by 1961. The new hotel, designed by William B. Tabler, was developed by the Uris Buildings Corporation. The original design of the Washington Hilton, with the east and west sides shaped like the letter Y, was criticized by architect Frederick Gutheim in The Washington Post. Gutheim suggested Tabler study Hilton's more inspiring designs, including the Hilton Istanbul Bosphorus and Caribe Hilton Hotel. He also noted that construction of the second office building on the property, named the Universal North Building, could block the view of hotel guests. The final design was the hotel being shaped similar to the number 3. Due to the strict height limits for buildings in Washington, D.C., construction of the 12-story hotel included the city's largest excavation project. More hotel space was built underground than above ground. The 500,000-square-foot (46,452 m^{2}) underground space includes a large ballroom, meeting rooms, concourse, kitchens, and garage. As construction of the hotel was almost complete in 1965, the design was praised by local architectural critic Wolf Von Eckardt.

In addition to the Universal South Building, Universal North Building, and Washington Hilton, there are three buildings on the former Oak Lawn estate. A theater at 1929 Florida Avenue NW was built in 1963 and adjoins the Universal North Building; in the late 2010s it briefly became a Flywheel Sports indoor cycling studio, before Flywheel went out of business in 2020. A small commercial building at 1835 Connecticut Avenue NW, between the two larger office buildings, was constructed in 1968. A luxury apartment building, The Hepburn, was constructed in 2016 and designed by Cecconi Simone. The Hepburn is located next to the hotel, and much like the hotel rooms, its apartments include expansive views of the city.

In 2022, the Post Brothers firm acquired the Universal Buildings for $203.7 million and announced plans to convert both to an apartment complex, described as "the largest residential conversion in DC." In 2024, the project became one of the earliest recipients of DC's newly-expanded Housing in Downtown tax-abatement program to spur such conversion projects, and in early 2026, the developers announced sufficient financing, including $465.3 million in Property Assessed Clean Energy, or PACE financing—believed to be the largest commercial PACE loan ever—to begin construction. The 1963 theater building is to be demolished as part of the redevelopment, which will also add several stories to the remaining existing buildings.
