= Treaty Oak (Washington, D.C.) =

350–400 year old oak tree in Washington, D.C

Coordinates: 38.916275°N 77.044703°W

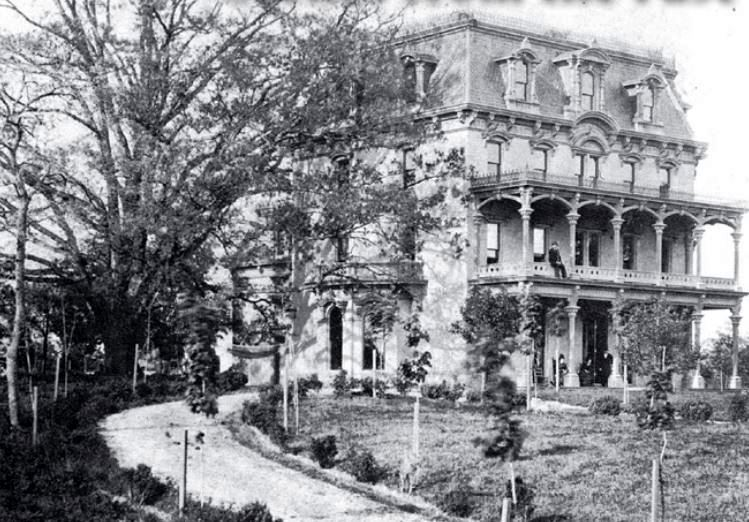
The Treaty Oak and adjoining Oak Lawn house, as viewed from the Florida Avenue driveway, around 1900.

The Treaty Oak was a 350–400-year-old oak tree that once stood on the Oak Lawn estate in Washington, D.C. The estate was previously called Widow's Mite and was owned by the Holmead and Nourse families. It included a large, four-story Second Empire house that owner Thomas P. Morgan had expanded. The estate was bounded by 19th Street, Columbia Road, Connecticut Avenue, and Florida Avenue, on the edge of today's Dupont Circle and Adams Morgan neighborhoods.

The oak tree earned its nickname due to local legends that a treaty was signed there between early settlers and Native Americans. Despite massive development in the surrounding neighborhoods during the late 19th century and early 20th century, the estate remained a wooded area and was sought by local developers. In 1922, a Masonic group purchased the estate for what was then a significant amount of money to build a massive complex that would include temples. The plans were never carried out, and in 1940, the site was chosen for the large Crystal Heights mixed development designed by Frank Lloyd Wright. That plan was also abandoned. The tree remained until 1953, when it was felled for a planned commercial development. The land where the tree and house once stood is the site of the Washington Hilton, an apartment building, and two office buildings. At the time of its destruction, the Treaty Oak was reportedly the largest oak tree in the Washington, D.C. area.

== Legends and history ==
=== Legends ===
The Treaty Oak was estimated to date from the mid-1600s to the early-1700s. There are three unproven legends about the tree, two of which involve white settlers and members of the local Nacotchtank tribe. The area where the Treaty Oak once stood was originally part of a 600-acre (243 ha) tract of land known as Widow's Mite.

The local legend behind the name Widow's Mite involves Manacasset, chief of the local Nacotchtank tribe, who allegedly lived beneath the tree due to its strategic view of the surrounding area. During a raid against local white settlers, Manacasset is said to have captured a woman named Magdalena Noyes and her infant daughter. After Magdalena refused his advances, Manacasset sentenced her to live underneath the tree, never stepping outside of its shadow, or she would be killed. Magdalena named her daughter Gwawa, which meant "hope", and she lived underneath the tree for the rest of her life. As a child, Gwawa is said to have been mocked by other Nacotchtank children due to her pale complexion. There was one child, though, a biracial Native American boy named Tschagarag, who befriended her. He taught Gwawa his native language, and together they explored the local area. The two would eventually fall in love and marry. After Manacasset was killed in battle, Magdalena died soon after that. Although she was originally a prisoner confined to live by the tree, during her later years, it was said Magdalena had grown to love the mighty oak. In her will, she allegedly wrote: "I, Magdalena Noyes, bequeath to my daughter, Gwawa, and her husband Tschagarag, all my property, consisting of the 17.5 acres [7.1 ha] of land, the hut I live in and all therein. And if contentment the germ of happiness be transferable, may you receive it and enjoy it all through life. I also have a request which I beg of you fulfill: Regard the Oak that overspreads our dwelling as an ancient relic. Cherish it through life as the talisman of a resigned sufferer. Should you be blessed with offspring, instill them with reverence for the tree such as will transmit from generation to generation."

The second legend involves members of the Nacotchtank tribe and white settlers signing a treaty beneath the tree. One version of this story involves Magdalena acting as the interpreter between the two parties. The third legend is that George Washington wanted the Capitol erected on the site, but Magdalena would not agree to the idea.

=== Recorded history ===
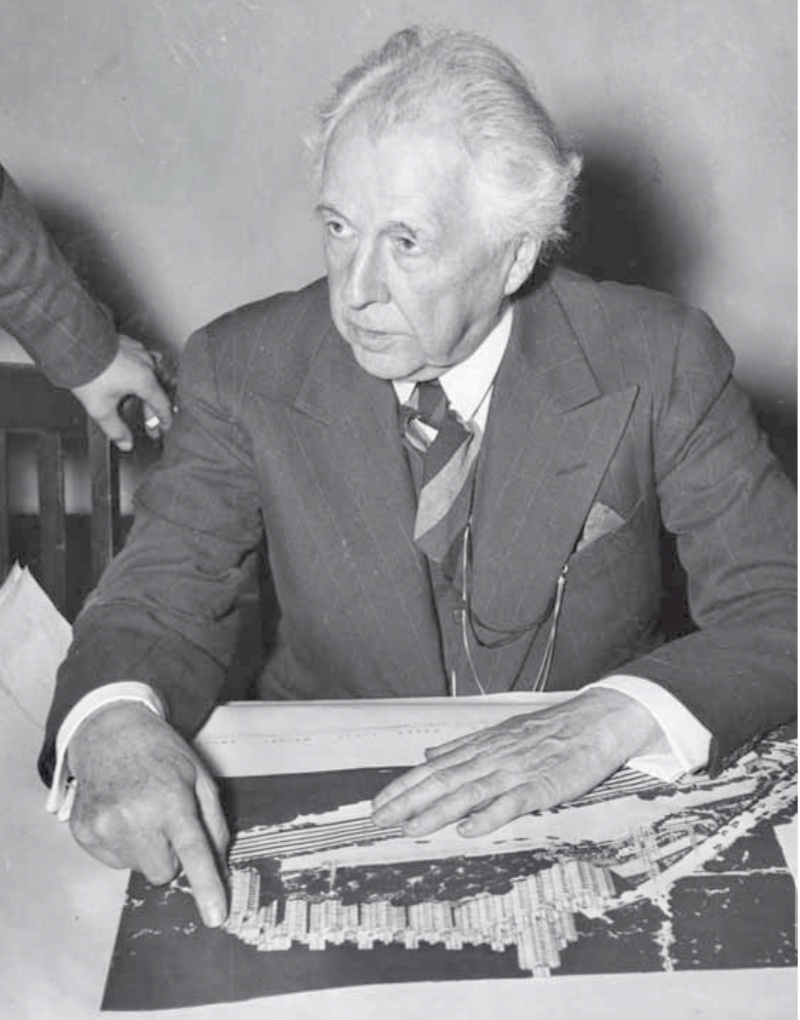
Frank Lloyd Wright with his plans for Crystal Heights in 1940.

When the City of Washington was laid out, the land where the Treaty Oak stood was part of a 16-acre (6.5 ha) farm owned by settler Anthony Holmead. He sold the land in 1809 to Colonel Michael Nourse, who was chief clerk at the Treasury Department. Nourse built a Federal style house on the land, next to the oak tree. He later sold the property because it was too far from downtown, resulting in a long commute to work.

The property, which was then 10 acres (4 ha) and bounded by today's 19th Street, Columbia Road, Connecticut Avenue, and Florida Avenue on the edge of the Dupont Circle and Adams Morgan neighborhoods, was purchased in 1866 by politician Thomas P. Morgan. He renovated and expanded the home into a large four-story Second Empire style house and named his estate Oak Lawn due to the large oak tree on his property. As the years progressed, the area around Oak Lawn developed into bustling residential and commercial neighborhoods, and due to the impressive views of the city from the estate, it was sought after by local developers. The following owner, the Dean family, sold Oak Lawn in 1922 to the Grand Lodge of Free and Accepted Masons for $900,000, a significant amount at the time.

The Masons planned to build a large $3,000,000 complex on the site, which they renamed Temple Heights, that would include temples, an auditorium for 3,000 people, and a large tower. The multiyear fundraising campaign ended in 1929 when the stock market crashed. The tree and house remained untouched through the Great Depression.

In 1940, developer Roy S. Thurman chose the site for his $12,000,000 mixed-use development that would include a large parking deck and 14 towers composed of a 2,500-room hotel, theater, apartments, and retail shops. Frank Lloyd Wrightwas selected to design the massive project, which he called Crystal Heights (later Crystal City). Due to lack of funding, local zoning laws, including the Height of Buildings Act of 1899, and the outbreak of World War II, the project was canceled.

During the following years, there were several plans for the site, including a park, war memorial, apartments and hotels, and large parking lot. The house was demolished in 1948 after plans were made to build a shopping center on the site. That plan was also abandoned and the Treaty Oak remained until March 13, 1953, when the property was cleared for yet another planned commercial development. At the time it was felled, a government expert estimated the tree was around 350 years old, but it was most often described as 400 years old. It was reportedly the largest oak tree in the Washington, D.C. area.

Following numerous abandoned plans for the former Oak Lawn property, in the 1960s, the Washington Hilton and two office buildings were built on the site. A luxury apartment building was also built there in 2016.
