= Crystal Heights =

Architectural design by Frank Lloyd Wright

Coordinates: 38.916159°N 77.045163°W

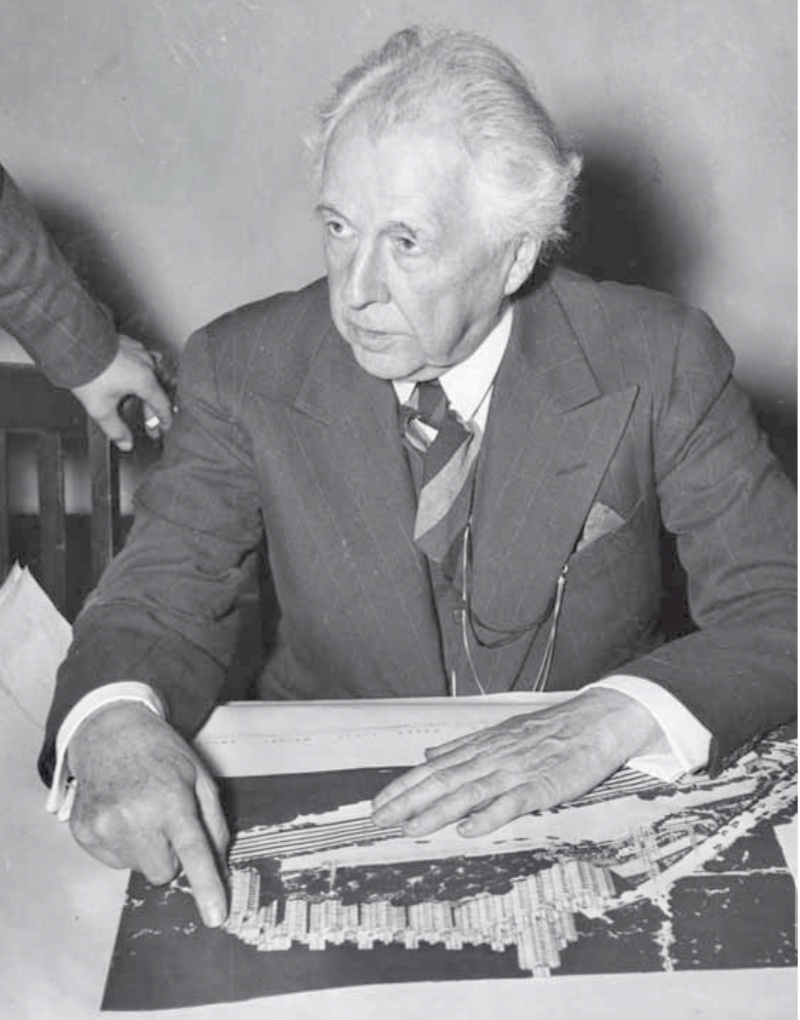
Frank Lloyd Wright with his design for Crystal Heights

Crystal Heights (also referred to as Crystal City) was a design by American architect Frank Lloyd Wright for a hotel, apartment, and shopping complex in Washington, D.C. The project would have been built on one of the largest remaining undeveloped tracts in the city, known as the Oak Lawn estate or Temple Heights, on the edge of the Adams Morgan and Dupont Circle neighborhoods. The site was bounded by 19th Street, Columbia Road, Connecticut Avenue, and Florida Avenue, all in the northwest quadrant.

One version of the design called for 2,500 hotel rooms, small apartments, parking for 1,500 cars, shops, and a 1,000-seat theater – a diversity of uses almost never seen in structures of the time – all within a complex consisting of a broad base covering the whole site topped by 15 towers. The proposal was defeated primarily by zoning requirements that prevented a multi-purpose structure at the site and forbade towers from rising more than 110 feet. The planned central tower would have been 240 feet (73 m) high and the remaining buildings 14-stories tall. After his design was rejected, Wright heavily criticized local officials and the National Capital Planning Commission. Today, the site is occupied by the Washington Hilton, commercial buildings, and an apartment building.

== History ==
=== Site history ===
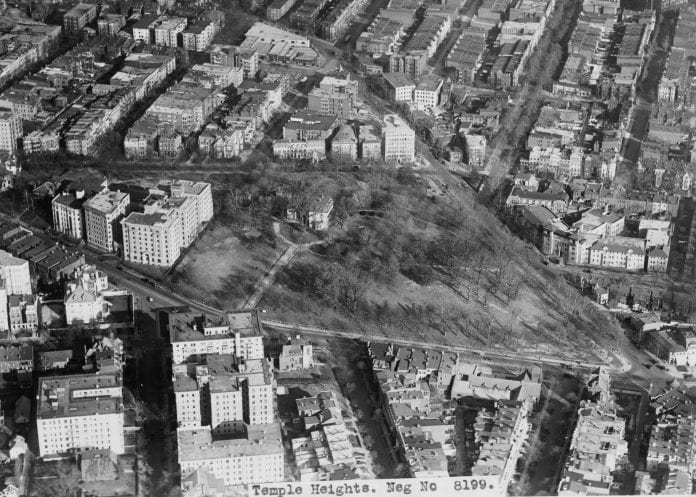
The Oak Lawn estate was one of the area's last undeveloped tracts of land.

The land where Crystal Heights was to be built was the remaining portion of a historic estate originally called Widow's Mite, and later Oak Lawn, Dean Estate, and Temple Heights. The property was acquired in 1660 and during the next 200 years, land was sold gradually until the remaining estate was around 10 acres (4.0 hectares), bounded by present-day 19th Street, Columbia Road, Connecticut Avenue, and Florida Avenue. A Federal-style house was built around 1820 on the northern end of the property, just a few yards from the Treaty Oak, where it was said early settlers and members of the local Nacotchtank tribe signed a treaty. The house was later expanded and renovated into a large Second Empire building that overlooked the city.

A Masonic group purchased the estate in 1922 with plans to build a large temple complex on the site. The $3 million (equivalent to $45.8 million in 2019) project would have included temples, an auditorium for 3,000 people, and a large central tower, although the National Capital Planning Commission (NCPC) did not approve the design. Despite raising a large amount for the project, the plan was canceled following the 1929 stock market crash and start of the Great Depression. A few years later Congress proposed purchasing part of the property and turning it into a public park, but the offer was turned down.

=== Crystal Heights ===
==== Design ====
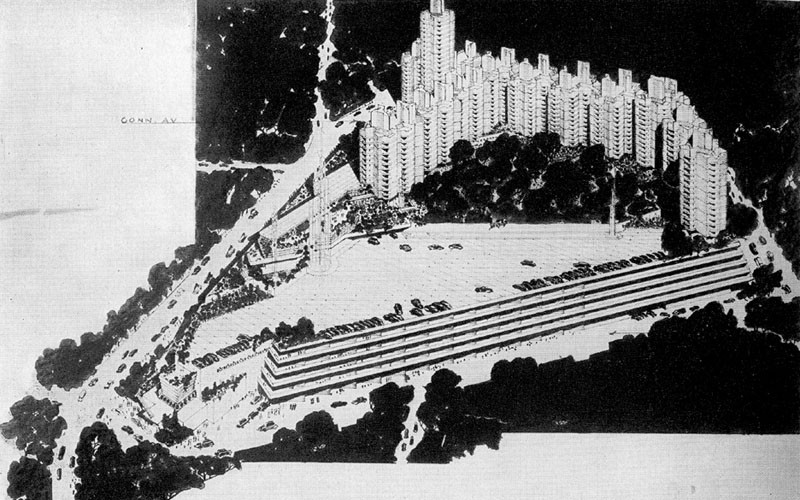
Crystal Heights design by Frank Lloyd Wright

In August 1940 a syndicate led by developer Roy C. Thurman acquired the estate, which at the time was described as "the last great undeveloped piece of property close to the center of the downtown area." Later that month Thurman announced initial plans for the site would include an 800-room air-conditioned hotel.

The following month Thurman hired noted architect Frank Lloyd Wright to design a massive $12–$15 million project, an early example of a mixed-use development. Construction was slated to begin at the end of the year. Wright's plans for the U-shaped project, which he called Crystal City and later Crystal Heights, was announced at a press conference at Thurman's 1643 Connecticut Avenue office. The plan included a 240 feet (73 m) high central tower and 14 additional towers containing a 2,500 room hotel and apartments. The plan also included a theater seating more than 1,000 people, a large shopping center, nine bowling lanes, a large cocktail featuring a 400-foot (120 m) crystal bar, fountains, and a five-level parking deck facing Florida Avenue. A large open terrace that included the entrance to the hotel would be located on top of the parking deck. Crystal Heights was designed to only occupy around one-third of the Oak Lawn estate. Wright and Thurman said some of the estate's trees, including the Treaty Oak, would not be cut down, and that the Treaty Oak would be a "central feature of one of the terraces."

Wright chose the name Crystal Heights because of the building materials he had chosen – bronze, glass, and white marble, with glass being the main material. He promised the "Versailles won't look like much when it is finished", described Crystal Heights as "Usonian" and "organic", and "In Crystal Heights, we have conceived a Washington Monument to modern progress and achievement." In describing the building layout, Wright said "Concrete pillars will rise like the branches of trees... Screens of marble, glass, and bronze will be suspended from the steel—like the leaves." The design for the duplex apartments, which would be in four of the fifteen towers, was similar to the St. Mark's-in-the-Bouwerie Towers in New York City, a Wright project that had been canceled. Around half of the hotel rooms that occupied the remaining towers were to have working fireplaces. Most apartments and hotel rooms would have a balcony and two sides of glass.

Wright said the project would "not be built on the heights" but "rather, it will be of the heights." Because the property was on a hill, the parking deck design would have taken advantage of the gradual incline. A tunnel leading from Connecticut Avenue was planned within the parking deck, that would supposedly allow an 8-mile (13 km) line of cars to all park within 20 minutes.

==== Zoning and height issues ====
The site was intentionally designed to be built into the hill to alleviate concerns from local officials regarding building height. Residential buildings were not allowed to exceed 90 feet (27 m) and for commercial buildings the limit is 110 or 130 feet (34 or 40 m), depending on the width of the street. The Masons had experienced difficulties in the 1920s with zoning officials due to their planned complex being too tall, and despite convincing President Herbert Hoover and Congress to grant them a religious exemption, the NCPC had the final say and denied the project.

Known for his dislike of architecture in Washington, D.C., Wright once described the city as an "aggregation of buildings" that were "not so far removed from what its traffic system is." His plan for Crystal Heights received a mixed reaction and his attitude toward local officials that were concerned with his design also may have played a part with its eventual rejection.

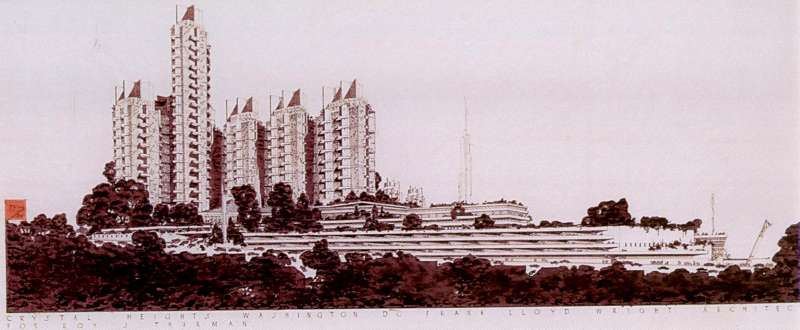
The Crystal Heights design exceeded the city's strict height limit.

Before construction could begin, the design would have to be approved by the NCPC and the zoning would have to be changed for commercial use. By December 1940 Wright had changed his design to win approval from city commissioners and zoning officials. He had reduced the tallest building to 135 feet (41 m), but this design was rejected by city officials who refused to make a height exemption for the project. Thurman and Wright tried to use the exemption the Masons had received, but were told it was only applicable to the Masonic design.

A neighborhood citizens association sided with Thurman and Wright on changing the zoning regulation for the site, which would have allowed the buildings to be 110 feet (34 m) tall instead of 90 feet (27 m), but residents of nearby apartment buildings, including the Wyoming, Highlands, and 2000 Connecticut Avenue, opposed the change. The NCPC's city planner suggested allowing the zoning change as a compromise, even though he was opposed to the overall plan.

Zoning officials were open to allowing commercial businesses on the property, but were opposed to have stores along Connecticut Avenue and a theater in a residential area. They would only allow businesses such as drug stores and barbershop to operate inside the hotel and apartment buildings. By early 1941 Thurman was publicly criticizing the NCPC and zoning officials for delaying the project. He said "It may reasonably be assumed that the decision of the Zoning Commissions should, firstly, be made promptly, and secondly on the record, on its independent judgment and not on the ex parte persuasions of a collateral body such as the Park and Planning Commission" and "this is most distinctly an undemocratic procedure and one that surely never would be countenanced under a truly representative form of government."

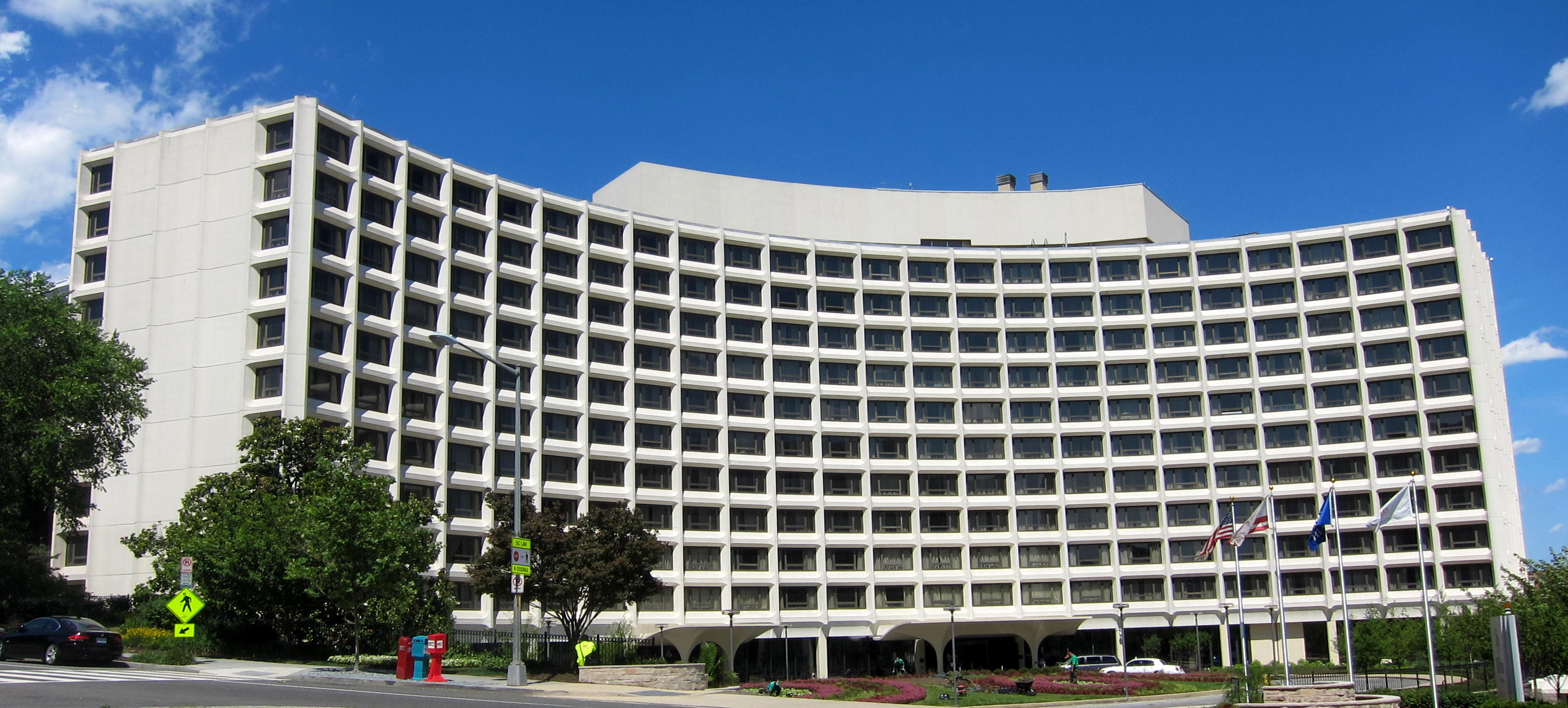
The Washington Hilton and an adjoining apartment building are on the Crystal Heights site.

Citing strong objection from neighbors, officials denied the zoning change in January 1941. The project's only hope was the following month when the NCPC would meet to discuss a new zoning classification called the "community unit" that would allow some exemptions to zoning regulations, but still not permit a theater or certain businesses.

After these changes were not approved and the US entered into World War II later that year, the Crystal Heights project ended. When Wright learned that the project had not been approved, he wrote an op-ed in The Washington Post lambasting the decision: "I had supposed our strength and greatness as a nation...not to lie in a leveling-off process characteristic of totalitarian government." Wright also had suspicions about Thurman and hired a private detective to investigate his business dealings. He learned Thurman was behind on payments for the property and Wright left the project. In an editorial for the Washington Times-Herald titled "A Genius Fights with the D.C. Government to Save His Crystal City, But the Pillars of Ancient Rome Are Against Him", Wright lambasted the city's "moronic bureaucracy."

The Oak Lawn property was sold in 1945 and during the next fifteen years there were several unsuccessful plans for the site. The Oak Lawn house was demolished in 1948 and the Treaty Oak felled in 1953. The Cafritz Construction Company and Charles H. Tompkins Company began construction of the Universal South Building, located at the corner of Connecticut and Florida Avenues, in 1956. A few years later Percy Uris hired William B. Tabler to design the Washington Hilton, which stands on the Crystal Heights site. The Universal North Building at the corner of Connecticut Avenue and T Street was constructed around the same time. A luxury apartment building, The Hepburn, adjoins the hotel and was completed in 2016.

==== Legacy ====
Although Crystal Heights was never built, there are three Wright buildings in the Washington, D.C., area: the Marden House, Pope–Leighey House, and Robert Llewellyn Wright House, the latter which was designed for his son. The apartment design at Crystal Heights was later realized in Wright's Price Tower, completed in 1956.

His design for Crystal Heights was unusual because mixed-use developments were not common at the time. Witold Rybczynski in Architect magazine opined "Had [Crystal Heights] or [St. Mark’s-in-the-Bouwerie] been built they would have altered Wright's ill-founded reputation as an anti-urban architect." Had Crystal Heights been built, it would have been the largest project designed by Wright and according to scholars, "it might have been the supreme achievement of an achievement-packed career, forerunner of a kind of architecture that the country embraced only decades later."

From the 1920s to 1940s the NCPC played a strong role in shaping the architecture of the city. The NCPC preferred buildings that were more classical in nature, including the Folger Shakespeare Library and Jefferson Memorial, which Wright described as "as out of place today as Thomas Jefferson himself would be if he came back wearing silk hose and a red velvet coat." The director of the city's Office of Planning said Wright's mixed-use ideas would be welcomed by local officials in the 21st century, but that the height limit would still apply. It was also noted the stacked parking deck design would not be approved because the terrace and park on top would have been unavailable to pedestrians. Architectural historian Mina Marefat said Crystal Heights "would have probably been Washington's best building...I certainly think it would have been Washington's most talked-about buildings" but that "I think that publicity was a factor in killing the project, because of the almost moralistic stands that both Wright and Thurman took."

Crystal Heights has been the subject of exhibitions at museums including the Museum of Modern Art and National Building Museum.

== See also ==
- List of Frank Lloyd Wright works
