= Crystal City =

Crystal City is the name of:

== Places ==
=== Canada ===
- Crystal City, Manitoba, Canada

=== United States ===
- Crystal, Colorado
- Crystal City, Missouri
- Corning (city), New York, nicknamed the Crystal City due to its glass industry
- Crystal, North Dakota
- Crystal City, Texas
  - Namesake of nearby Crystal City Internment Camp during World War II
- Crystal City, Virginia

== Stations ==
- Crystal City station (VRE), a commuter rail station in Virginia
- Crystal City station (Washington Metro), a Washington Metro station in Virginia

== Other ==
- The Crystal City, a 2003 novel by Orson Scott Card
- Crystal City, an alternate name for the Crystal Heights development proposed for Washington DC by Frank Lloyd Wright
- Crystal City, a 1977 album by Junko Ohashi, and the title track released as a single in 1978

== See also ==
- Crystal Island (building project), a proposed supertall building project in Moscow, Russia
