= Dave Thomas Circle =

Triangular traffic circle in Washington, D.C.

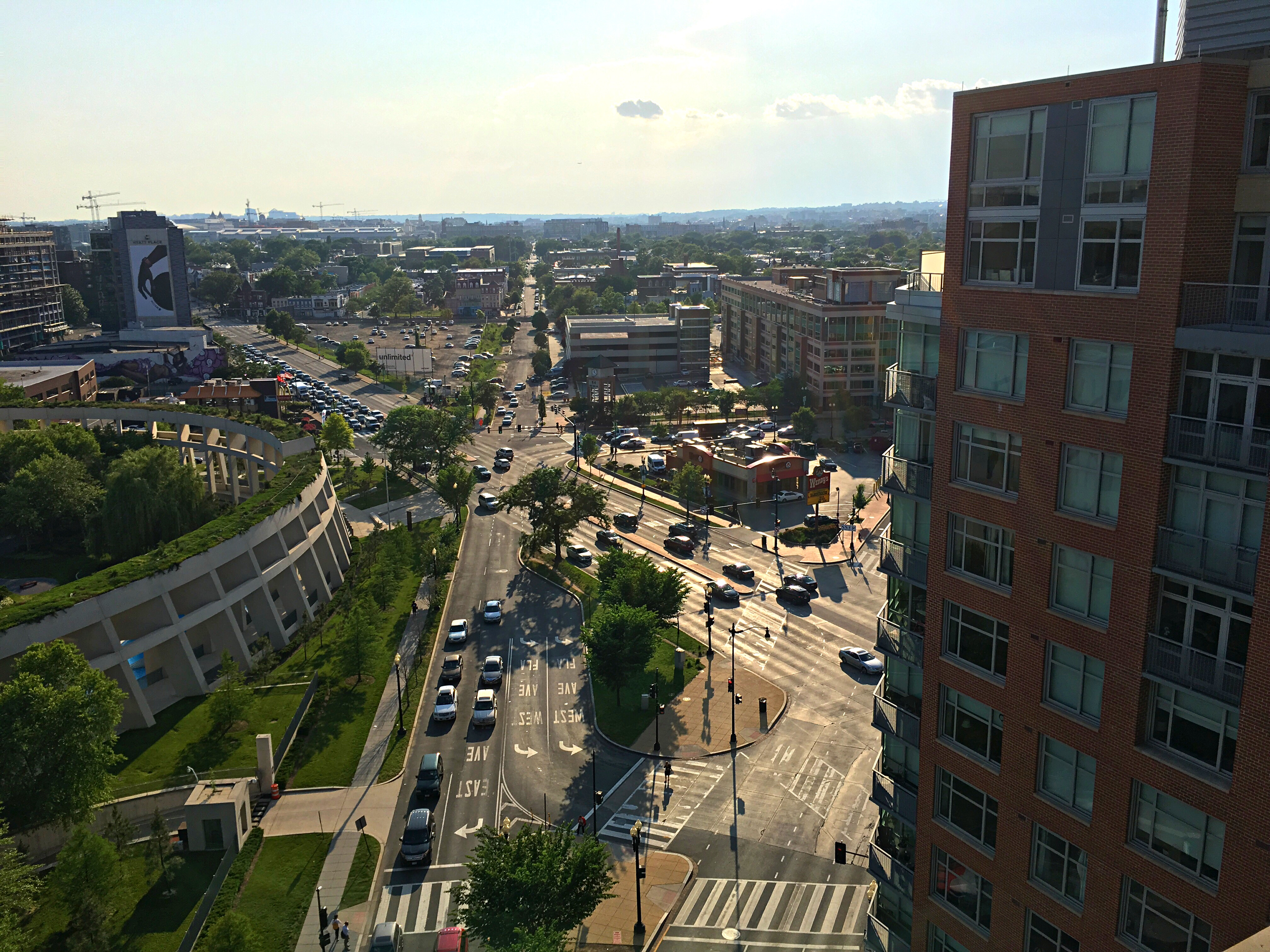
- View of the namesake Wendy's restaurant in 2017, looking west along O Street

Location
- Eckington, Northwest Washington, D.C.
- Coordinates: 38.90896°N 77.00549°W
- Roads at junction: Florida Avenue, New York Avenue and First Street Northeast, with O Street Northeast and Eckington Place Northeast

Construction
- Maintained by: District of Columbia Department of Transportation

Dave Thomas Circle was the unofficial nickname for a small triangular block in Northeast Washington, D.C., and the surrounding streets and traffic pattern, which existed from 2010 to 2024. It was bounded by Florida Avenue, New York Avenue and First Street Northeast, with O Street Northeast and Eckington Place Northeast also terminating along the block. It was located on the eastern edge of the L'Enfant Plan.

== Background ==
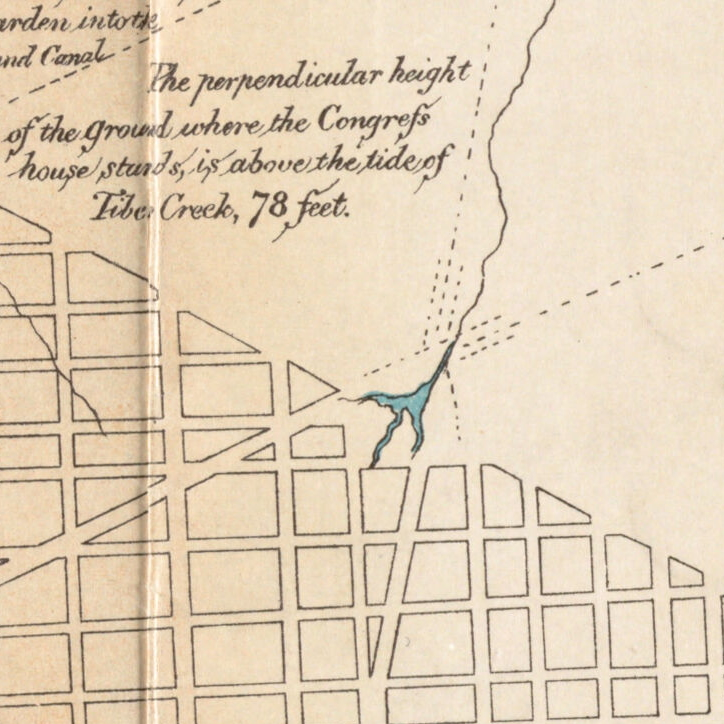
Detail of an 1887 copy of the 1791 L'Enfant Plan, showing Tiber Creek (center) at the future site of Dave Thomas Circle

The circle was a result of a gap in the original L'Enfant Plan. The plan ended where east-west O Street and north-south First Street reached Boundary Street (now Florida Avenue), where they met Tiber Creek, which was eventually buried and culverted over. As development increased over time, traffic congestion increased. Until 2021, the only property on the block was a Wendy's fast food restaurant franchise and its parking lot, leading to the unofficial Dave Thomas Circle name, after Dave Thomas, who founded Wendy's in 1969 and served as its long-time spokesman.

A 2010 project by the District Department of Transportation made each of the streets one-way around the block, similar to a traffic circle. The department calls the traffic pattern a "virtual circle."

The intersection developed a reputation as one of the most chaotic and dangerous intersections in Washington, D.C. In 2018, the intersection of New York Avenue and First Street saw 102 crashes, making it the second most dangerous in the city. DDOT attributed the issues to "a combination of unusual geometry, turning movements, closely spaced intersections, and high traffic volumes." Drivers frequently encountered long traffic jams, especially at the intersection of Florida and New York Avenues.

== Redesign and closure ==
In 2019, Washington, D.C. Mayor Muriel Bowser asked for $35 million for the city to buy the Wendy's and reconfigure the intersection to eliminate Dave Thomas Circle and make it better for motorists, pedestrians and bicyclists.

In 2021, the District Department of Transportation acquired the Wendy's restaurant and property through eminent domain to enable the city to demolish the building, rebuild the intersection and eliminate the circle. The city originally planned to start construction in early 2022. The restaurant closed on September 21, 2021, with the franchisee vacating the building fully by September 30.

Under the final plan approved in November 2021, First Street was re-routed to run directly into Eckington Place, both First Street and Florida Avenue were transformed into two-way streets, and the block of O Street between First and Second Streets removed entirely, effectively eliminating the "virtual circle" design. The new layout created three new spaces for parks or public art.

Demolition on the Wendy's was started in July 2023, starting a projected $41 million renovation to the intersection. In October 2023, it was announced the intersection would be renamed Mamie 'Peanut' Johnson Plaza in honor of the pioneer of female African-American baseball.

The first phase of the new traffic pattern, including the reconstructed First Street and a new left-turn lane from New York to Florida Avenue, opened in July 2024.
