= Holmead's Burying Ground =

Former cemetery in Washington, D.C.

- Interactive map of Holmead's Burying Ground

Details
- Established: 1794
- Location: Dupont Circle, Washington, D.C.
- Country: United States
- Coordinates: 38.9153°N 77.0437°W
- Type: secular and public; closed March 6, 1874
- Owned by: Holmead's: Anthony Holmead (1794 to 1820); Western Burial: City of Washington (1798 to 1820); Unified cemetery: City of Washington (1820 to 1885)
- Size: 2.94 acres (11,900 m^{2})
- No. of graves: about 10,000
- Find a Grave: Holmead's Burying Ground

Holmead's Burying Ground, also known as Holmead's Cemetery and the Western Burial Ground, was a historic 2.94-acre (11,900 m^{2}) cemetery located in the Dupont Circle neighborhood of Washington, D.C., in the United States. It was founded by Anthony Holmead in 1794 as a privately owned secular cemetery open to the public. The city of Washington, D.C., constructed the Western Burial Ground on the remainder of the city block in 1798, and the two burial grounds became synonymous. The city took ownership of the private Holmead cemetery in 1820. The unified cemetery went into steep decline around 1850, and it was closed on March 6, 1874. Removal of remains, most of which were reinterred at Graceland Cemetery or Rock Creek Cemetery, continued until 1885.

== Burying ground history ==
=== Founding Holmead's Burying Ground ===
Holmead's Burying Ground was built on land originally owned by Anthony Holmead, a tobacco farmer who lived in Prince George's County in the Province of Maryland in the early and mid 1700s. In 1718 or 1726, Holmead purchased 206 acres (830,000 m^{2}) of land in the northern section of what was known as the "Widow's Mite" tract in what would later become the District of Columbia. (Note: The exact boundaries of land grants in the Maryland at this time are difficult to determine. But the Widow's Mite tract appears to have been bounded by an area beginning at 22nd and K Streets NW; moving eastward along K Street NW to 18th Street NW; north along 18th Street NW to Florida Avenue NW; northeast along Florida Avenue NW to 17th Street NW; north on 17th Street NW to Irving Street NW; west on Irving Street NW to Rock Creek; south from Rock Creek to Mintwood Place NW; Southwest from Mintwood Place NW to Connecticut Avenue NW just north of Belmont Road NW; due south from Connecticut Avenue NW (partially along 22nd Street NW) to 22nd and N Streets NW; southeast and partially along Ward Street NW to the intersection of New Hampshire Avenue NW and Ward Street NW; southwest along New Hampshire Avenue NW to 22nd Street NW; and south on 22nd Street NW to the original point at the intersection of 22nd and K Streets NW.) Holmead died intestate in 1750, and his nephew, a 22-year-old from Devon, England, also named Anthony Holmead, inherited the estate and emigrated to America to take ownership of it. Upon his arrival in Maryland, the younger Holmead purchased two additional land patents (Beall's Plains and Lamar's Outlet) along Rock Creek north of Widow's Mite.

The younger Holmead wanted to build a burying ground (Note: The term "burying ground" was common in North America until the 1850s, when the word "cemetery" came into use.) on part of the Widow's Mite tract. It is unclear whether he actually established a family burial plot there by 1791, or merely contemplated one, but the intended location was a 100 by 120 feet (30 by 37 m) space on the southwest corner of what is now 19th and T Streets NW. (The long edge was along 19th Street.) His plans were complicated by the establishment of the District of Columbia. On July 9, 1790, Congress passed the Residence Act, which approved the creation of a national capital on the Potomac River. The exact location was to be selected by President George Washington, who chose a portion of the states of Maryland and Virginia on January 24, 1791. Only a portion of the new "District of Columbia" was intended to be used as a city. This "Federal City", or City of Washington, was laid out in the L'Enfant Plan of 1791, and was bounded by Boundary Street (northwest and northeast; now Florida Avenue), 15th Street Northeast, East Capitol Street, the Anacostia River, the Potomac River, and Rock Creek. The federal government purchased title to all land within the Federal City, which included land owned by Holmead. Holmead was entitled to repurchase his land at £12 and 10 pence per acre, and did so. Part of his repurchase involved the 100 by 120 feet (30 by 37 m) rectangle on the northeast corner of what was now called Square 109.

Holmead's purchase was delayed for nearly five years. Square 109 lay just inside the city limits, it was unclear just where streets were to be laid out. It took five years for surveying and platting of the city to be completed. Finally, on August 31, 1796, the federal government at last determined the exact locations of 19th and T Streets and the boundaries of Square 109 and permitted Holmead to purchase his 100 by 120 feet (30 by 37 m) plot of land.

=== Founding the Western Burial Ground ===
The City of Washington designated the entirety Square 109 as a public burying ground on February 28, 1798, turning the rest of the block into a publicly owned cemetery known as the Western Burial Ground. Unfortunately, the Western Burial Ground was not as ideally sited as Holmead's Burying Ground. The southern end of the cemetery was just a few feet above the water table, which meant that coffins could be buried only 2.5 feet (0.76 m) down, and erosion often exposed burials in this section.

== Operation ==
Even though technically within the boundary of the city, for most of its history Holmead's was essentially in a rural area of forest with heavy undergrowth. There were almost no buildings around it, and the cemetery could only be reached by 20th Street—which could be distinguished from the surrounding forest only because the trees along the route had (mostly) been cut down and there was a rutted wagon track to follow. The site was so rural that, for many years, the track followed by the northbound mail stagecoach ran through the center of Square 109.

=== Early burials ===
Burials at Holmead's began even before the Holmead purchased his land. The first recorded burial occurred on May 29, 1794, when Robert Smith of Boston was interred in the far northeast corner of the burying ground. Other burials soon followed. There were enough burials at the site (even though it had not officially opened) that the interment of Patrick McGurk in 1802 created a serious controversy. McGurk was the first man ever executed in the District of Columbia (he murdered his wife while drunk). His body was buried at Holmead's, but relatives of those already buried there decided it was an affront to their loved ones. That night, a mob disinterred McGurk's corpse and buried it in a ravine to the east. When McGurk's friends discovered the desecration of his remains, they dug up the body and had it reburied at Holmead the following night. Members of the Hines family (a prominent and wealthy clan living in the District) discovered that McGurk had been buried next to one of their kin, they disinterred the body yet again and buried it in a marsh immediately to the west of Holmead's. This time, the body was not easily discovered, and it lay there undisturbed for almost 80 years. Another early burial was that of the entire Pearce (or Peerce) family. About 1804, as Lafayette Square was about to be developed, the entire Pearce family cemetery was relocated to Holmead's. The Pearces owned a farm on the land north of the White House, and the family's burying ground was located on the north side of Pennsylvania Avenue NW near the southwest corner of the soon-to-be-constructed square.

In 1807, the laying out of burial plots at Holmead's Burying Ground was finally completed, and the cemetery opened for business. Lots were put up for sale for $2 each ($44 in 2025 dollars), with purchases limited to a total of six lots. At that time, the cemetery was not yet enclosed, but Holmead promised to erect a fence within year.

=== City takeover ===
On May 15, 1820, the City of Washington took title to Holmead's Burying Ground. The term "Western Burial Ground" and "Holmead's Burying Ground" began to be used as a synonym for the entire square about this time. Three commissioners were appointed to oversee the cemetery, and for many years these positions were held by Lewis Johnson, Jacob A. Bender, and Dr. Joseph Burrows. A sexton was also appointed, and given the duty of not only digging graves but keeping records of burials. Accurate records for both Holmead's and Western were kept back to 1812, although they were incomplete prior to that year. For most of the unified cemetery's history, the position of sexton was occupied by just three men: John Douglas, Guy Graham, and W.R. Graham. To ensure that the cemetery remained open to all members of the public, the city enacted a law in 1829 under which the sexton could be fined $10 for refusing to bury someone.

The city takeover also required that the entire block be enclosed with a split-rail fence with gates. (This was later replaced by a more solid plank fence.) The cemetery was to be segregated by race, with a fence of thorn bushes separating the African American section from the rest of the burial ground. (Racial segregation of burials continued until the cemetery closed.) The price of burial plots was raised to $3 for choice sites and $2.50 for less select sites. Proceeds from lot sales were to pay for the retention of records, the construction of a sexton's house, and for maintenance of the grounds.

=== Deterioration ===
Much of the land around Holmead's Burying Ground was sold for development by the early 1850s, and houses and other buildings began to be constructed on nearby city blocks. To accommodate the new development, the city graded and gravelled 20th Street in 1856, making it far easier to access Holmead's.

The cemetery began to near capacity in the late 1850s. But burials were also slowing dramatically. The rapidly growing city needed more cemeteries, and as these were built they provided competition for Holmead's. New cemeteries included the Presbyterian Burying Ground in 1802 (which drew wealthy and middle class whites from the Georgetown neighborhood), the massive Congressional Cemetery in 1807, the Roman Catholic Holy Rood Cemetery in 1832, the landscaped and luxuriously designed Oak Hill Cemetery in 1848 (also in Georgetown), the large and landscaped Glenwood Cemetery in 1854, the massive Roman Catholic Mount Olivet Cemetery in 1858 (which largely replaced Holy Rood), and Prospect Hill Cemetery in 1858. There was even competition for African American burials, as new blacks-only cemeteries such as Mount Zion Cemetery (1808), the Harmoneon (1829), the Female Union Band Cemetery (1842), and Columbian Harmony Cemetery (which replaced the Harmoneon in 1859) were constructed. Fewer and fewer whites people were interred at Holmead's, and most of the burials which occurred came from the city's African American population. The lack of activity at Holmead's attracted vandals, who knocked over monuments and desecrated graves there. The situation became so serious that the D.C. Metropolitan Police Department began patrolling the grounds.

The deterioration at Holmead's Burying Ground was accelerated as the cemetery was filled beyond its capacity in the 1860s and 1870s. Burial plots often contained three or four bodies, one on top of the other, with the uppermost coffin just a foot or two below the surface. Space was at such a premium that plots were sold immediately adjacent to the walkways, creating crowded conditions. Changes to Boundary Street worsened the cemetery's appearance. The street was graded in late 1869 and early 1870, which dropped the street some 7 to 8 feet (2.1 to 2.4 m) below the surface of the cemetery. But no retaining walls were constructed, leaving the earthen banks prone to erosion. Coffins next to Boundary Street sometimes became exposed, and some even fell into the street.

== Closure ==
=== 1871 attempted closure ===
In August 1871, the D.C. Board of Public Health declared Holmead's Burying Ground a public nuisance. The cemetery was in significant disrepair, and it was overgrown with shrubs, vines, and weeds. Noxious odors and fluids emanated from recent graves, which were too near the surface. Extensive development, primarily housing, had occurred in the area, exposing the public to these problems.

The goal of the designation of Holmead's as a public nuisance was to permit the mass disinterment of bodies and the reclamation of Square 109 for development purposes (such as housing). However, no funds for such disinterment were available, and the Board of Public Health said it lacked the authority to order disinterments. The city also barred new interments at Holmead's Burying Ground some time before December 1873, but the order was not enforced.

By this time, the cemetery contained more than 9,000 official burials, with unofficial burials bring the total to more than 10,000. All burials were supposed to be registered with the city. But many people could not pay for the burial of a loved one, and it was not uncommon for poorer people to bury their deceased surreptitiously at night or to bribe a sexton to permit an unofficial burial. Unofficial and illegal burials continued despite the city's interment bans. Simply abandoning the cemetery in situ was not an option. Public pressure was mounting to have the cemetery moved, and Square 109 turned into a more useful site. Subsequently, the Board of Public Health recommended that the site be cleared of bodies and turned into a public park.

Now largely abandoned, Holmead's Burying Ground became a prime target of "resurrectionists", or body snatchers. Resurrectionists often haunted cemeteries to identify lonely people whose bodies had been newly interred. They then dug up the corpse and sold it to anatomists, medical schools, and other institutions of higher learning. George Christian, a clerk in the office of the Surgeon General of the United States, opened a resurrectionist business about 1870, and stole not only bodies but funerary materials (clothing, coffins, shrouds, and urns) as well. One of his assistants, Maude Brown, would attend the funeral of a newly deceased person who appeared to lack friends or family. She marked the grave, and later that night Christian and his male friends "resurrected" the body. Christian dressed so well in the fine clothing he stole from corpses that he avoided detection for years. On December 12, 1873, Christian and his companions were arrested for public intoxication, suspicious behavior, and drunk and disorderly conduct on a sidewalk near Holmead's Burying Ground. In a large sack carried by the men, the police discovered the body of Thomas Fletcher—whom the gang had just liberated from Holmead's. Christian was convicted of body snatching, and sentenced to a year in prison and a $1,000 fine.

=== 1874 closure and the beginning of disinterments ===
The resurrectionist activity spurred the city to act. It ordered all burials at the cemetery to cease on March 6, 1874, and it began strictly enforcing its order. (Note: Some sources argue for different closure dates. Richardson says the cemetery closed in the 1850s, with the Federal Writers' Project says 1860.)

The closure of the cemetery led many families to begin to disinter their loved ones in anticipation of the burying ground's closure. Among these was Peggy O'Neale Eaton, former owner of one of the most popular hotels in the city, the Franklin House. Eaton's parents, William and Rhoda O'Neale, and two of her brothers were buried at Holmead's. Once a wealthy socialite married to Senator John Henry Eaton, her reputation was destroyed during the Petticoat affair of 1830-1831 that rocked President Andrew Jackson's Cabinet. Eaton's third husband, Antonio Gabriele Buchignani, then ran off to Europe with Eaton's money. With her family's graves at risk, Eaton had to beg wealthy D.C. philanthropist William Wilson Corcoran for the funds to move her relatives to Oak Hill Cemetery. The money was granted, and the O'Neales were moved.

As pressure to close Holmead's Burying Ground and move the bodies elsewhere mounted, questions about the legality of the move began to be raised. Chief among the concerns was the common assumption that the Holmead family had turned over its portion of Square 109 to the city for use exclusively as a burial ground. If this land was no longer used for that purpose, it was believed, the property would revert to Holmead's heirs. A legal investigation into the transfer of title began in January 1874 to resolve the question.

In 1878, the D.C. city commissioners voted to provide $2,000 for the disinterment of bodies at Holmead's. There is a question as to whether the city had the legal authority to disinter remains at this time. John Claggett Proctor, writing in The Evening Star in November 1884, said the city lacked this legal authority "until recently", which indicates that controversy over the city's disinterment plan existed. By this time, the investigation into the cemetery's legal title had revealed an astonishing fact: The city had no right to occupy most of Square 109. In 1798, land in the District of Columbia which had not yet been sold to private owners still belonged to the federal government. While Anthony Holmead had paid for and owned the 100-by-120-foot (30 by 37 m) lot in the northeast corner, the federal government had not transferred title to the rest of square to the District of Columbia. Thus, when the District of Columbia ordered the rest of Square 109 turned into a city-owned cemetery in 1798, it did not have title to this land and thus lacked the legal right to make such an order. Since the city did not own this land, the sale of burial plots on the non-Holmead portion were invalid. This quashed any attempt by lotholders to stop the removals. Somewhat anticlimactically, the title investigation also revealed that the Holmead plot would not revert to the heirs if it was abandoned as a burying ground.

Congressional action was needed to remedy the situation. On March 3, 1879, Congress enacted legislation (20 Stat. 353) that transferred title of Square 109 to the District of Columbia. (Note: Initially, this legislation gave the city the authority to sell the property so long as the proceeds were used to fund the D.C. public schools. This proviso appears not to have been included in the final legislation.) The law also granted the city permission to begin disinterments, and contained a provision to reimburse lotholders for reinterment costs. By October 1879, more than 700 private disinterments had occurred, although a great many more reburials had yet to occur.

=== Second round of disinterments ===
On June 4, 1880, Congress appropriated $2,000 to allow the District of Columbia to assist families in removing the bodies of loved ones from Holmead's Burying Ground. The city commissioners said in July that they would approve disinterments without question in order to speed the process. They began advertising the city's assistance in removing bodies on July 8, and announced a deadline for removals of December 10, 1880.

The federal funds ran out in 1881, so another $3,000 was appropriated to continue the removals. The city awarded a contract to a local firm about January 1882 to begin mass disinterment of the remaining burials. Work began at the southern end of the cemetery. Workers dug to a depth of six feet, lifting out coffins where they could be found and sifting the earth for any other remains. As they worked their way north, most of the remains they discovered were the caskets of children, whose bodies and soft bones had long decomposed. Cemetery records were reviewed to determine if the body was Caucasian or African American. White remains were sent to a mass grave at Rock Creek Cemetery, and black remains were transferred to a mass grave at Graceland Cemetery. As many as 1,000 remains had been disinterred. But the 1881 appropriation also ran out, leaving an estimated 2,000 corpses behind. (Note: Newspaper reports said that 800 of the removed bodies were reinterred at Rock Creek Cemetery. This suggests that most of the removals in late 1881 and in early 1882 were African Americans.) The process of removing such large numbers of remains was not well managed. Many coffins were left exposed, and a large number of empty graves were not filled in. A public scandal erupted in April when local children were seen playing with leg and arm bones, and placing skulls on poles.

=== Final removals and sale ===
As the city cleared Holmead's Burying Ground and readied it for sale, city attorneys discovered that the 1879 law gave the city title to the land—but did not give it any right to sell or convey the land. The city desperately wanted to sell it: There was strong private interest in the land, and the city said that if it received the right to sell the property it would place the square on the market as fast as it could. Congressional action was once again needed to rectify the problem. On June 24, 1884, the House of Representatives took up the conference report for the District of Columbia appropriations bill for fiscal 1885 (July 1, 1884 to June 30, 1885). During floor debate, the conference report was amended to give the city the authority to sell Holmead's Burying Ground so long as the proceeds were used to fund the D.C. public schools. The Senate agreed to the House's amended conference report (23 Stat. 130) on July 5, 1884.

Although removals were still occurring at Holmead's, work halted at the start of October 1884 as warm weather made the stench from decomposing bodies too noisome for work to continue. The work crew of 70 men resumed disinterments on October 28, and by late November a total of 3,000 bodies had been removed from Holmead's. Workers anticipated that the cemetery would be empty by mid to late December. The cost of this last phase of the removal was estimated at $4,000. (The city intended to finance this cost from the land sale.) On December 16, funeral home director A.H. Gawler exhumed the body of Lewis Powell from Holmead's Burying Ground. Powell, one of the four conspirators hanged for playing a role in the assassination of Abraham Lincoln in July 1865, had been buried there in an unmarked grave (the site known only to Gawler and a few U.S. Army personnel). The Evening Star newspaper reported in January 1885 that, during this final phase of disinterment, a total of 1,246 bodies had been moved to a mass grave at Graceland Cemetery, 1,665 bodies had been moved to a mass grave at Rock Creek Cemetery, and 958 bodies had been moved by family members.

On December 22, 1884, the city sold the entirety of Square 109 (128,209 square feet (11,911.0 m^{2})) to John Roll McLean, publisher of The Washington Post, for $52,000. In doing so, the city confirmed that it had removed all bodies from the site. The remaining $48,000 went to the construction and maintenance of city public schools.

McLean built Holmead Park on a portion of the former Holmead's Burying Ground. In 1905, he erected the Cordova Apartments (now the President Madison Apartments) on the northwest corner of the square.

== About the cemetery ==
Holmead's Burying Ground was a typical urban cemetery. The pathways through the cemetery were straight, and most graves were marked with upright sandstone slabs. Some family plots were marked by large, above-ground monuments and ringed with iron fences. Burial plots were small, and graves were closely packed. Landscaping was minimal, and consisted of short cedar trees. For most of its history, a solid wooden wall enclosed the cemetery on all sides.

The northeast quarter of the site (which included the original Holmead's burial plot) was reserved for Caucasians. The cemetery was racially segregated, and the southwest quarter of the square (which was somewhat separate from the rest of the site by a ravine) served as the burial ground for African Americans. The southeast section was generally reserved for military personnel. Most of the burials here were soldiers who fought in the War of 1812, and nearly all of them came from Camp Hill (a United States Army encampment located where the United States Naval Observatory now exists). At one point before 1879, a portion of the military section was illegally sold to a local African American association which had formed to create a cemetery for colored people. The sale was discovered and situation rectified.

Until the end of the 1850s, Holmead's Burying Ground was one of the two most prominent cemeteries in the District of Columbia, and until Glenwood Cemetery and Oak Hill Cemetery opened, Holmead's Burying Ground was thronged with visitors each Sunday.

== Notable interments ==
Holmead's Burying Ground was one of the most prominent cemeteries in Washington, D.C., from its inception until about 1850. Many locally famous people and locally prominent families were buried there. Among some of the notable burials were:

- Lorenzo Dow (1777–1834), itinerant preacher in the Second Great Awakening (later removed to Oak Hill Cemetery)
- James Hoban (c.?1758–1831), architect and designer of the White House (later removed to Mount Olivet Cemetery)
- James McGurk aka James McGirk (?–1802), first man to be executed in the District of Columbia (removed to a nearby marsh after two days)
- Josiah Meigs (1757–1822), president of the University of Georgia and Commissioner of the General Land Office (removed in 1878 to Arlington National Cemetery)
- William and Rhoda (née Howell) O'Neale, the owners of Franklin House, a popular Washington, D.C., hotel, and parents of socialite Peggy Eaton; the family burial plot also included two of their adult male children (removed between 1874 and 1879 to Oak Hill Cemetery)
- Lewis Powell (1844–1865), co-conspirator in the assassination of Abraham Lincoln (removed in 1884, but the site of reinterment is not known)
- William Winston Seaton (1785–1866), journalist and newspaper editor (removed at an unknown date to Congressional Cemetery)
- Andrew Way, noted printer of Congressional documents (before the establishment of the United States Government Printing Office) in the District of Columbia

== See also ==
- Anthony Holmead Archeological Site

== Bibliography ==
- Carrier, Thomas J. (1999). Washington D.C.: A Historical Walking Tour. Charleston, S.C.: Arcadia Publishing. ISBN 0738500496.
- Commission to Investigate the Title of the United States to Lands in the District of Columbia (1910). Title of the United States to Lands in the District of Columbia S.Doc.632 61st Cong., 2d sess. Washington, D.C.: Government Printing Office.
- Evelyn, Douglas; Dickson, Paul; Ackerman, S.J. (2008). On This Spot: Pinpointing the Past in Washington, D.C. Sterling, Va.: Capital Books. ISBN 9781933102702.
- Federal Writers' Project (1942). Washington, D.C.: A Guide to the Nation's Capital. New York: Hastings House.
- Hagner, Alexander (1904). "Street Nomenclature of Washington City". Records of the Columbia Historical Society: 237–261.
- Hansen, Stephen A. (2011). Kalorama Triangle: The History of a Capital Neighborhood. Charleston, S.C.: History Press. ISBN 9781609494216.
- Hansen, Stephen A. (2014). History of Dupont Circle: Center of High Society in the Capital. Charleston, S.C.: The History Press. ISBN 9781626195646.
- Hawkins, Don Alexander (Spring–Summer 1991). "The Landscape of the Federal City: A 1792 Walking Tour". Washington History: 10–33.
- Health Officer of the District of Columbia (1873). First Annual Report of the Health Officer of the District of Columbia, 1872. Washington, D.C.: Gibson Brothers, Printers.
- Meigs, William M. (1887). Life of Josiah Meigs. Philadelphia: J.P. Murphy, Printer.
- Oldroyd, Osborn H. (1901). The Assassination of Abraham Lincoln: Flight, Pursuit, Capture, and Punishment of the Conspirators. Washington, D.C.: O.H. Oldroyd. p. 211. "holmead's cemetery corporation."
- Pippenger, Wesley E. (2004). Dead People On the Move!. Westminster, Md.: Willow Bend Books. ISBN 0788431943.
- Proctor, John Claggett; Black, Frank P.; Williams, E. Melvin (1930). Washington, Past and Present: A History. New York: Lewis Historical Publishing Co.
- Richardson, Steven J. (1989). "The Burial Grounds of Black Washington: 1880-1919". Records of the Columbia Historical Society: 304–326.
- Ridgely, Helen West (1908). Historic Graves of Maryland and the District of Columbia, With the Iappearing on the Tombstones in Most of the Counties of the State and in Washington and Georgetown. New York: Grafton Press.
- Shultz, Suzanne M. (1992). Body Snatching: The Robbing of Graves for the Education of Physicians in Early Nineteenth Century America. Jefferson, N.C.: McFarland and Co. ISBN 0899505872.
- United States Congress (1881). "Chapter 121, Section Miscellaneous Expenses". The Statutes at Large of the United States of America, From April 1879 to March 1881, and Recent Treaties, Postal Conventions, and Executive Proclamations. Volume 21. Washington, D.C.: Government Printing Office.
- Worpole, Ken (2003). Last Landscapes: The Architecture of the Cemetery in the West. London: Reaktion. ISBN 186189161X.
