= Lorenzo Dow =

American preacher (1777–1834)

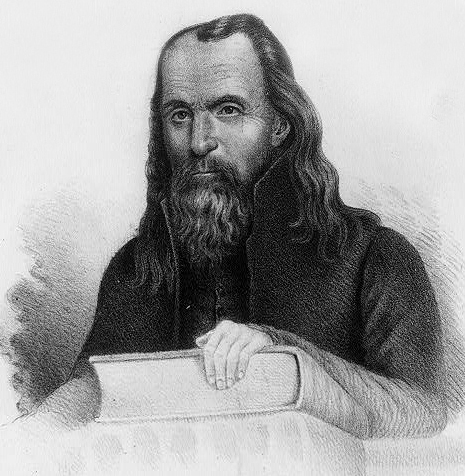
Lorenzo Dow

Lorenzo Dow (October 16, 1777 – February 2, 1834) was an eccentric itinerant American evangelist, said to have preached to more people than any other preacher of his era. He became an important figure and a popular writer. His autobiography at one time was the second best-selling book in the United States, exceeded only by the Bible.

== Early life ==
Born at Coventry, Connecticut, to Humphrey Dow and Tabitha Parker Dow, Dow was a sickly child and was much troubled in his youth by "religious speculations", but ultimately joined the Methodist faith. In 1796 he made an unsuccessful application for admission into the Connecticut conference; but two years later he was received, and in 1798—despite the objections of his family—was appointed to be a circuit preacher, on a probationary basis, to the Cambridge circuit in New York. During the year he was transferred to Pittsfield, Massachusetts, and afterward to Essex, Vermont, but remained there only a brief time.

== Missionary travels ==
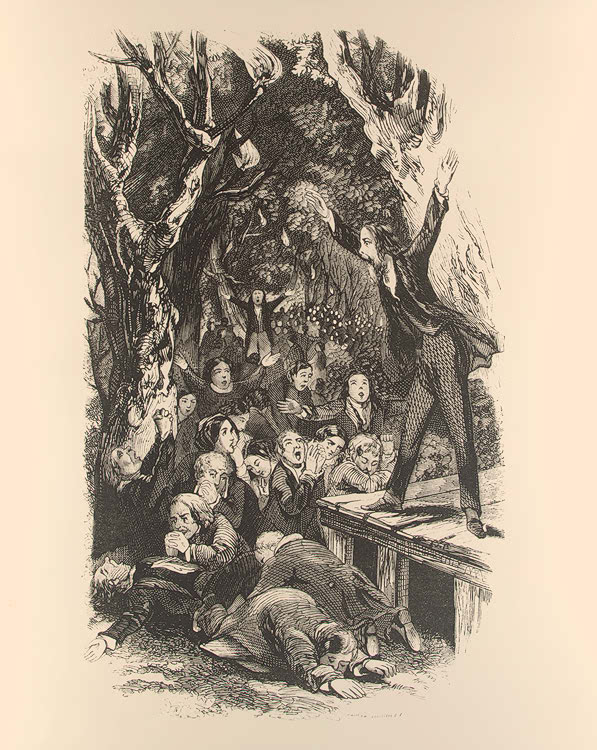
Lorenzo Dow preaching, engraving by Lossing-Barritt, 1856

Dow made three visits to Ireland and England, in 1799, 1805 and 1818, and by his eccentric manners and attractive eloquence drew after him immense crowds. He took what he believed to be a divine call and crossed the Atlantic Ocean to preach as a missionary to the Catholics of Ireland, and thereafter was never connected officially with the ministry of the Methodist Church, though he remained essentially a Methodist in doctrine. He introduced camp meetings into England, and the controversy about them resulted in the organization of the Primitive Methodist Society.

In 1802, he preached in the Albany region of New York, against atheism, deism, Calvinism, and Universalism. He passed the years 1803 and 1804 in what was then the Mississippi Territory (present day states of Mississippi and Alabama), delivering the first Protestant sermon within the bounds of those future states. Just south of Mansfield, Georgia, on State Route 11, is a large rock on which is a plaque, placed by the Daughters of the American Revolution. It states that on that rock, in 1803, Dow preached the first "Gospel sermon" in Jasper County. In 1807 he extended his labors into Louisiana Territory.

Dow's enthusiasm sustained him through the incessant labors of more than 30 years, during which he preached in almost all parts of the United States. His later efforts were directed chiefly against the Jesuits; indeed he was in general a vigorous opponent of Catholicism.

In America and Britain he attracted crowds to hear and see him, and he was often persecuted as well as admired. Because the churches were closed to him, Lorenzo Dow preached in town halls, farmers' barns, and even in open fields. He would preach anyplace where he could assemble a crowd. He preached to Methodists, Baptists, Quakers, Catholics, and atheists alike. He liked to appear unexpectedly at public events, announcing in a loud voice that exactly one year from today, Lorenzo Dow would preach on this spot. He never disappointed his audiences; he appeared exactly 365 days later at the appointed place, usually met by huge crowds.

Dow's public speaking mannerisms were like nothing ever seen before among the typically conservative church goers of the time. He shouted, he screamed, he cried, he begged, he flattered, he insulted, he challenged people and their beliefs. He told stories and made jokes. It is recorded that Lorenzo Dow often preached before open-air assemblies of 10,000 people or more and held the audiences spellbound.

== Traveling preacher ==
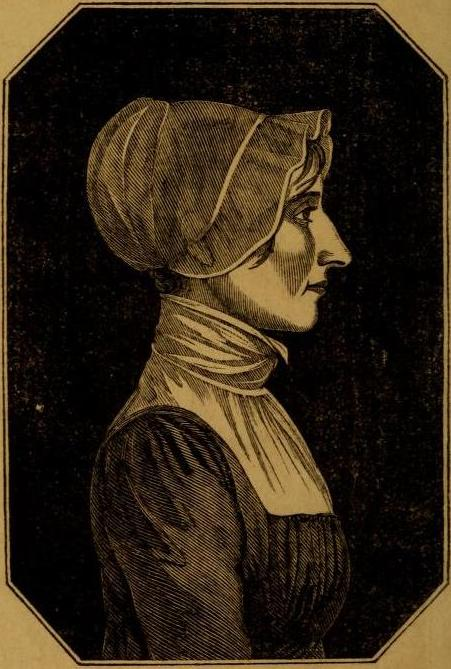
Peggy Dow, aged 35

Dow's fame spread, and so did his travels. He traveled on foot and occasionally on horseback (when someone would donate a horse) sometimes accompanied by his wife, Peggy Dow throughout what was then the United States. His journeys took him to Canada, England and Ireland, and once to the West Indies. He was usually well-received although there were exceptions. A fierce abolitionist, Dow's sermons were often unpopular in the southern United States, and he frequently was threatened with personal violence. He sometimes was forcibly ejected from towns, pelted with stones, eggs, and rotten vegetables as it happened in Jacksonboro, Georgia, around 1820. That never stopped him; he simply walked to the next town and gave the same sermon again.

Lorenzo Dow was personally unkempt. He did not practice personal hygiene and his long hair and beard were described as "never having met a comb". He usually owned one set of clothes: those that were on his back. When those clothes became so badly worn and full of holes that they were no longer capable of covering him, some person in the audience usually would donate a replacement. The donated clothes often were not the correct size for his skinny body. When he traveled, he carried no luggage other than a box of Bibles to be given away. Throughout most of his life, what little money he ever collected was either given away to the poor or used to purchase Bibles. In his later years, he did accumulate a bit of money from the sales of his autobiography and religious writings. His singularities of manner and of dress excited prejudices against him, and counteracted the effect of his eloquence. Nevertheless, he is said to have preached to more persons than any man of his time.

He died in Georgetown, Washington, DC, in 1834, at the age of 56, after an illness. During his final illness he was cared for by his friend, George Haller. Before he died, he asked that his old greatcoat be used as his winding sheet. He was placed to rest at Holmead's Burying Ground. A headstone with an epitaph that he personally selected was placed on his grave:

A Christian is the highest style of man;
He is a slave to no sect, takes no private road,
But looks through nature up to nature's God.

In 1887, when old Holmead's cemetery was about to be abolished, William Wilson Corcoran donated money and Dow was disinterred and moved to Oak Hill Cemetery, near Georgetown.

== Remembrance ==
His influence and popularity during his life led to many children of the early 19th century, especially on the American frontier, to be named after him. The 1850 U.S. census lists 220 men and boys with the first names of Lorenzo Dow, and more than 1,500 with Lorenzo D. In the 1818 Washington almanac, there is a humorous anecdote about Lorenzo Dow saving a woman's infidelity by pretending to raise the devil (the woman's paramour, who was hiding in a barrel, which Dow set on fire). His autobiography became a bestseller, and the 1850 U.S. census counts Lorenzo as one of the most popular first names in America.

== Family ==
His wife, Peggy Dow (1780–1820), was almost as eccentric as her husband. In 1814 she published her autobiography, entitled Vicissitudes Exemplified; or the Journey of Life. After her death, her husband had a new edition published with additional material, under the revised title Vicissitudes in the Wilderness: Exemplified in the Journal of Peggy Dow.

== Selected works ==
- Polemical Works (1814)
- The Stranger in Charleston, or the Trial and Confession of Lorenzo Dow (1822)
- A Short Account of a Long Travel; with Beauties of Wesley (1823)
- History of a Cosmopolite; or the Four Volumes of the Rev. Lorenzo Dow's Journal, concentrated in One, containing his Experience and Travels from Childhood to 1814 (1814; many later editions); this volume also contains "All the Polemical Works of Lorenzo." The edition of 1854 was entitled The Dealings of God, Man, and the Devil as exemplified in the Life, Experience and Travels of Lorenzo Dow.
