= Anthony Holmead Archeological Site =

Historic site in Washington, D.C., U.S.

- U.S. National Register of Historic Places
- U.S. Historic district – Contributing property
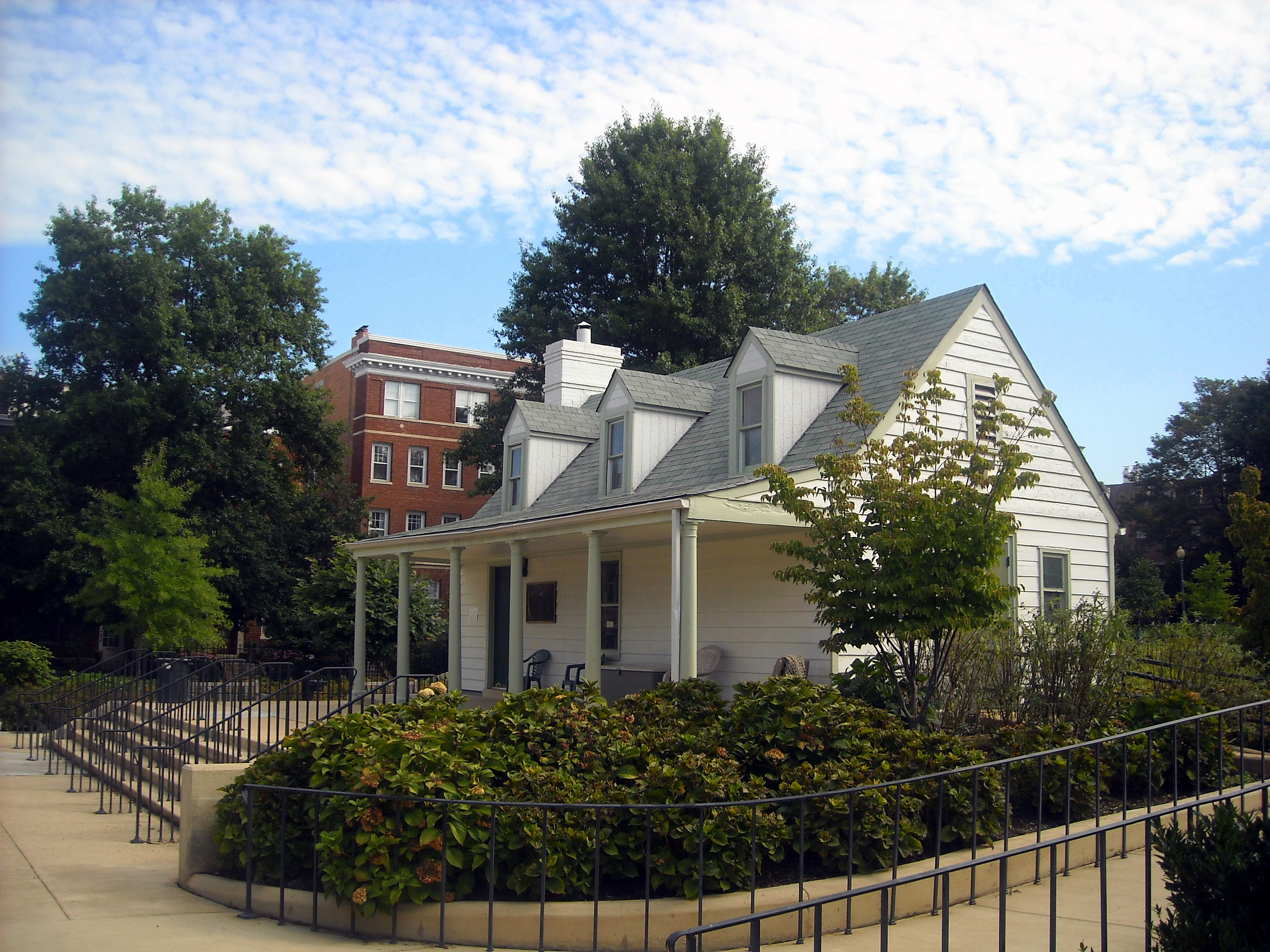

- Location within Washington, D.C.
- Location: 2806 N Street, N.W. Washington, D.C.
- Coordinates: 38°54′58.67″N 77°3′.13″W
- Built: 1816
- Architectural style: Vernacular
- Part of: Sheridan-Kalorama Historic District (ID89001743)
- NRHP reference No.: 95000527
- Added to NRHP: April 27, 1995

Anthony Holmead Archeological Site, at Mitchell Park, is a historic site located at 1801 23rd Street, Northwest, Washington, D.C., in the Sheridan-Kalorama neighborhood.

== History ==
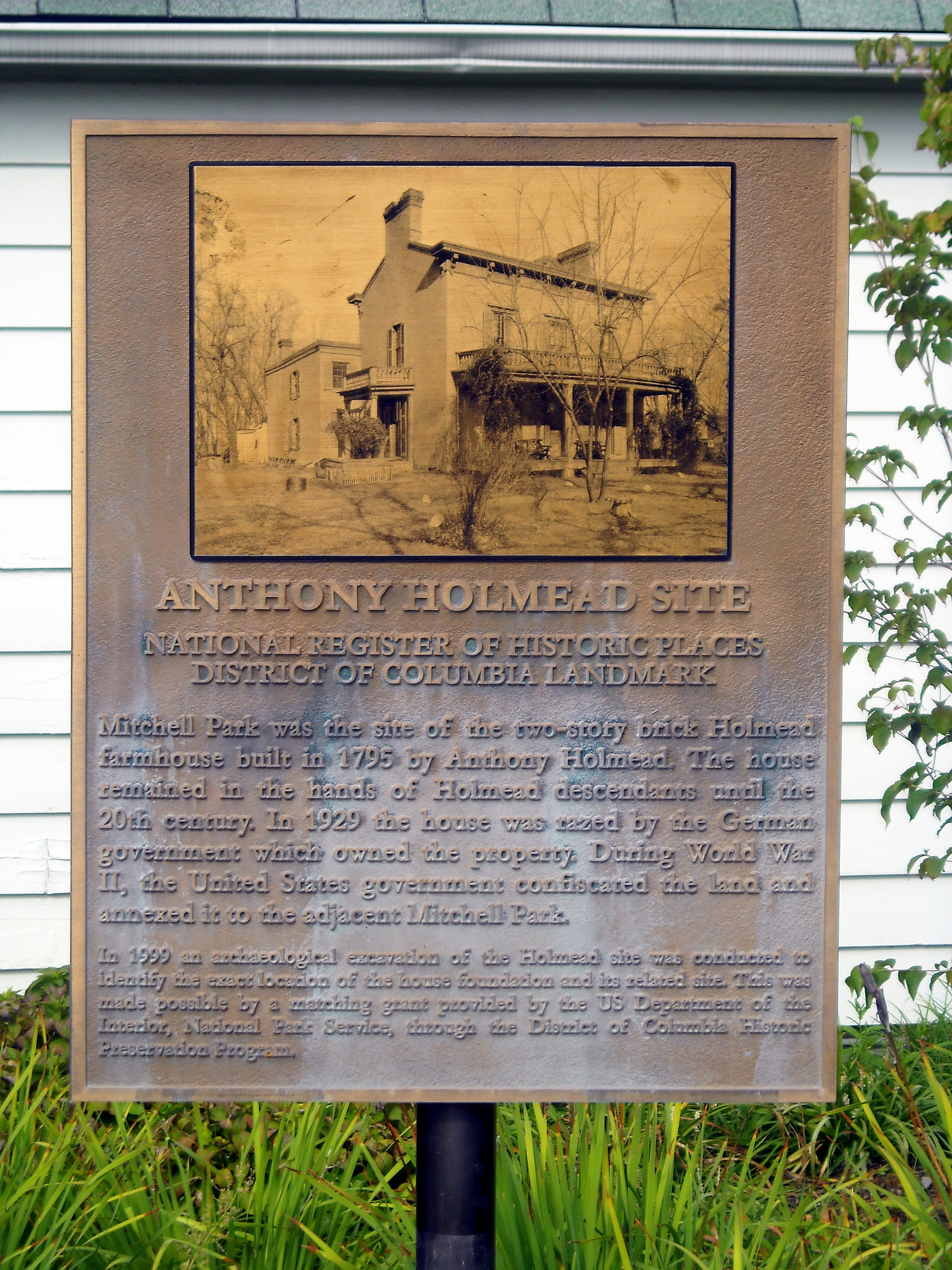
Descriptive historical marker at the site

Anthony Holmead II built a two-story brick house at the site in 1795. The house was seized for use as a Union hospital during the Civil War and accidentally set on fire in 1865. The house was rebuilt, then sold in 1894. The German government bought it in 1904 to use as an embassy, which was seized by the US government during World War I. In 1922, the German government purchased the house once again and demolished it, but lost the property during World War II before constructing another building. The land was then donated to the city of Washington for use as a park.

The site was added to the National Register of Historic Places on April 27, 1995, and is a contributing property to the Sheridan-Kalorama Historic District. The 2009 property value of the site (park included) is $6,956,490.

== See also ==
- National Register of Historic Places listings in the upper NW Quadrant of Washington, D. C.
- Holmead's Burying Ground, which provides a more extensive history of the area
