= Mitchell Park (Washington, D.C.) =

Public park in the United States

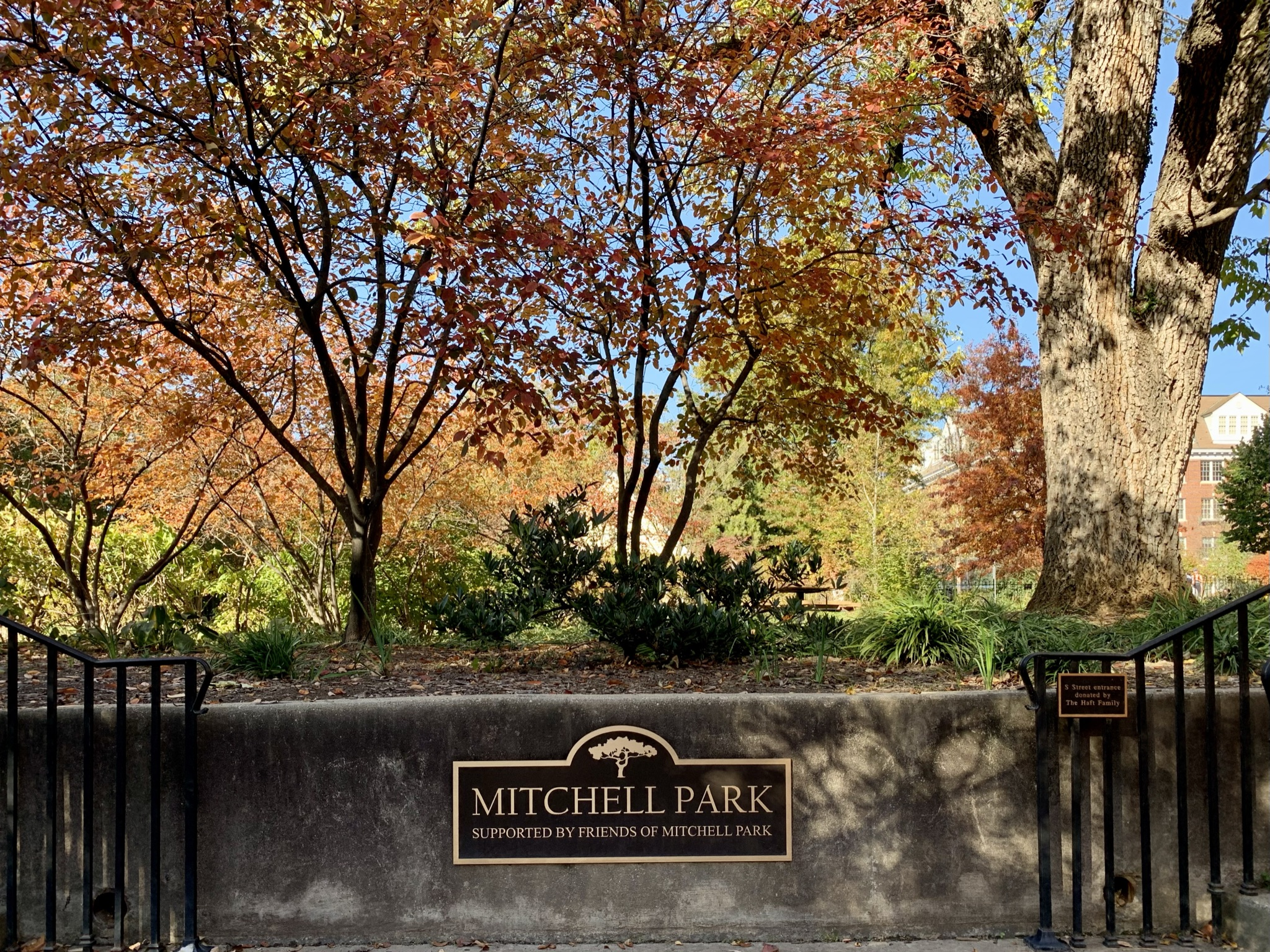
- The park in 2020
- Interactive map of Mitchell Park
- Location: Washington, D.C., United States
- Coordinates: 38°54′52″N 77°02′58″W

Mitchell Park is a public park in Washington, D.C.'s Kalorama Heights neighborhood, in the United States. It includes the Anthony Holmead Archeological Site.

== Description and history ==
Mitchell Park is in the Kalorama Heights neighborhood of Washington, D.C. It has a fountain, a garden, and an area for dogs.

The park has hosted film screenings and other programming. According to Thrillist, "This postage-stamp sized park in the middle of Kalorama is a green square of respite in the otherwise busy neighborhood. After years of decline, the park underwent a major fundraising effort—and archeological dig—before reopening to the public in 2004 as an oasis with nearly 25,000 plantings (trees, shrubs, flowers, etc.). Mitchell Park remains an 'if you know, you know' spot for picnics and peaceful hangs." Town & Country said in 2017, "The annual fund-raiser to benefit the park is the best-attended neighborhood event of the year; this past March it was held at the French ambassador's residence."

== Reception ==
Valerie Paschall included the park in Curbed's 2013 list of ten "secret or underrated" parks and gardens in Washington, D.C. Paschall recommended Mitchell Park for a dog walk or a picnic and wrote, "Hidden in Kalorama, Mitchell Park is another neighborhood park unfrequented by the masses. With a fountain, a beautiful fenced garden, a play area for canines and small open patch of grass for humans, you can picnic, smell the flowers, or toss a frisbee. Regularly the host of giggling children and watchful parents, the park is well-enjoyed by locals, but never cramped for space."

== See also ==
- List of parks in the Baltimore–Washington metropolitan area
