= 18th Street NW =

Street in Washington, D.C., USA

Coordinates: 38°54′43.4″N 77°2′29.9″W

18th Street Northwest
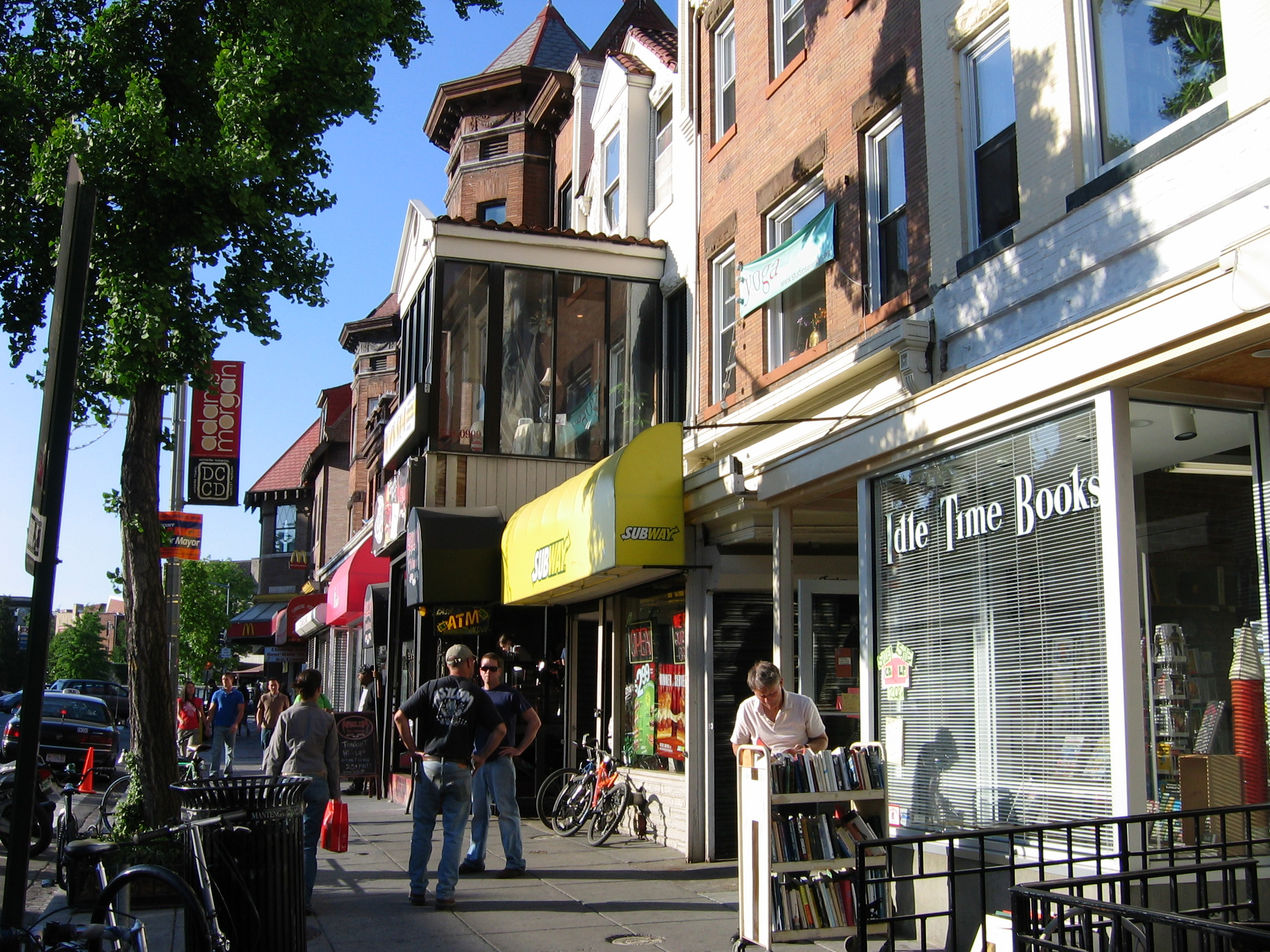
- Shops along 18th Street NW in the Adams Morgan neighborhood
- Interactive map of 18th Street Northwest
- Maintained by: DDOT
- Length: 2.1 mi (3.4 km)
- Location: Northwest, Washington, D.C., U.S.
- South end: US 50 (Constitution Avenue) in Foggy Bottom
- Major junctions: US 29 (K Street) in Downtown; Connecticut Avenue in Dupont Circle
- North end: Columbia Road in Adams Morgan
- East: 17th Street
- West: 19th Street

Construction
- Commissioned: 1791

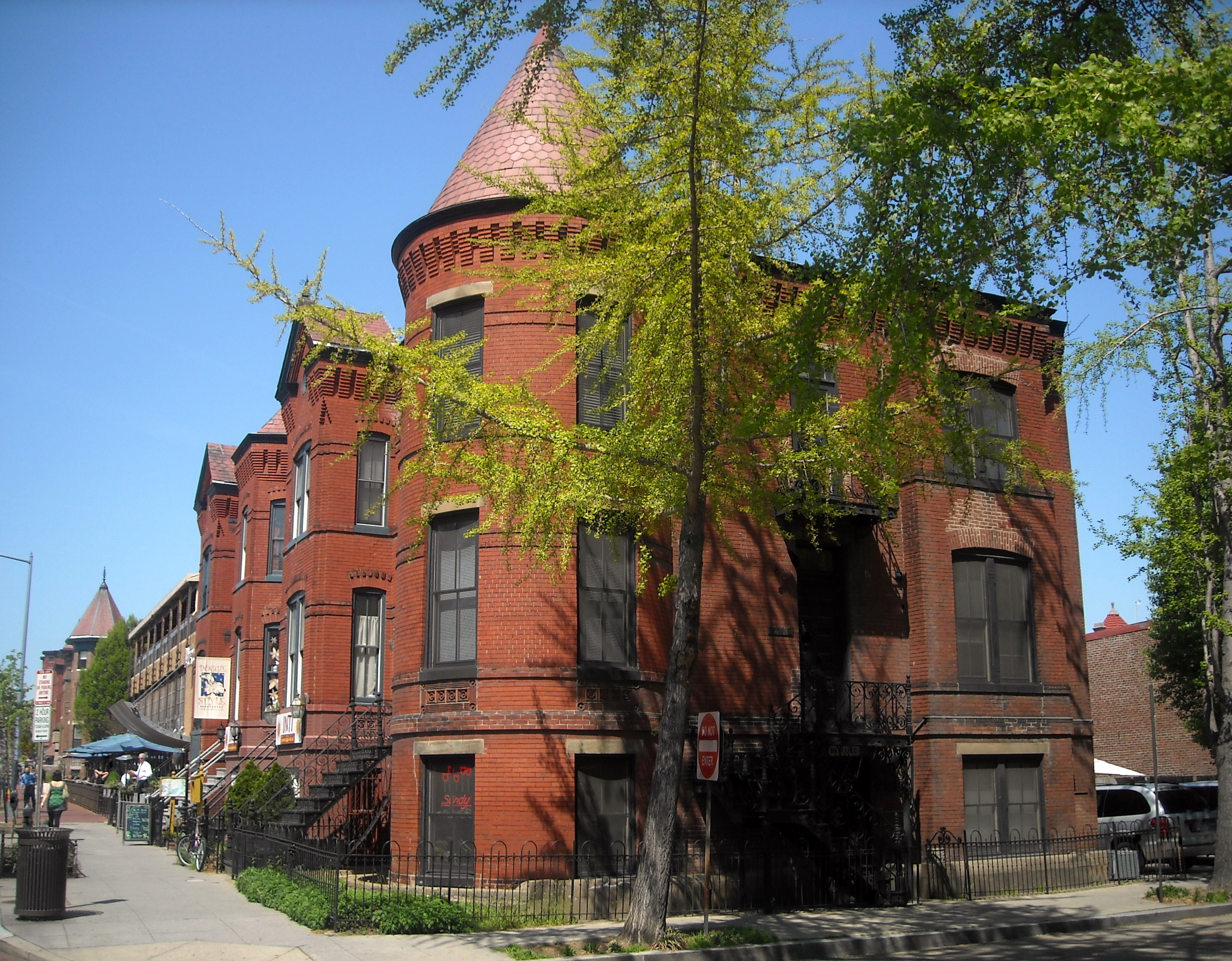
18th Street in the Strivers' Section Historic District

18th Street Northwest is a prominent north–south street thoroughfare in the Northwest quadrant of Washington, D.C.

== History ==
The "18th Street" roadway was part of the 1791 L'Enfant Plan for Washington by Pierre Charles L'Enfant.

In the present day 18th Street also travels through downtown Washington and the Dupont Circle and Mount Pleasant neighborhoods. It is also one of the main streets in the Adams Morgan neighborhood; the other is Columbia Road.

It passes through the Strivers' Section Historic District in the Dupont Circle neighborhood. Many bars, nightclubs, and restaurants are located on 18th Street in Adams Morgan, and on weekends it is frequently congested with cars and pedestrians, especially at last call.

== Notable people ==
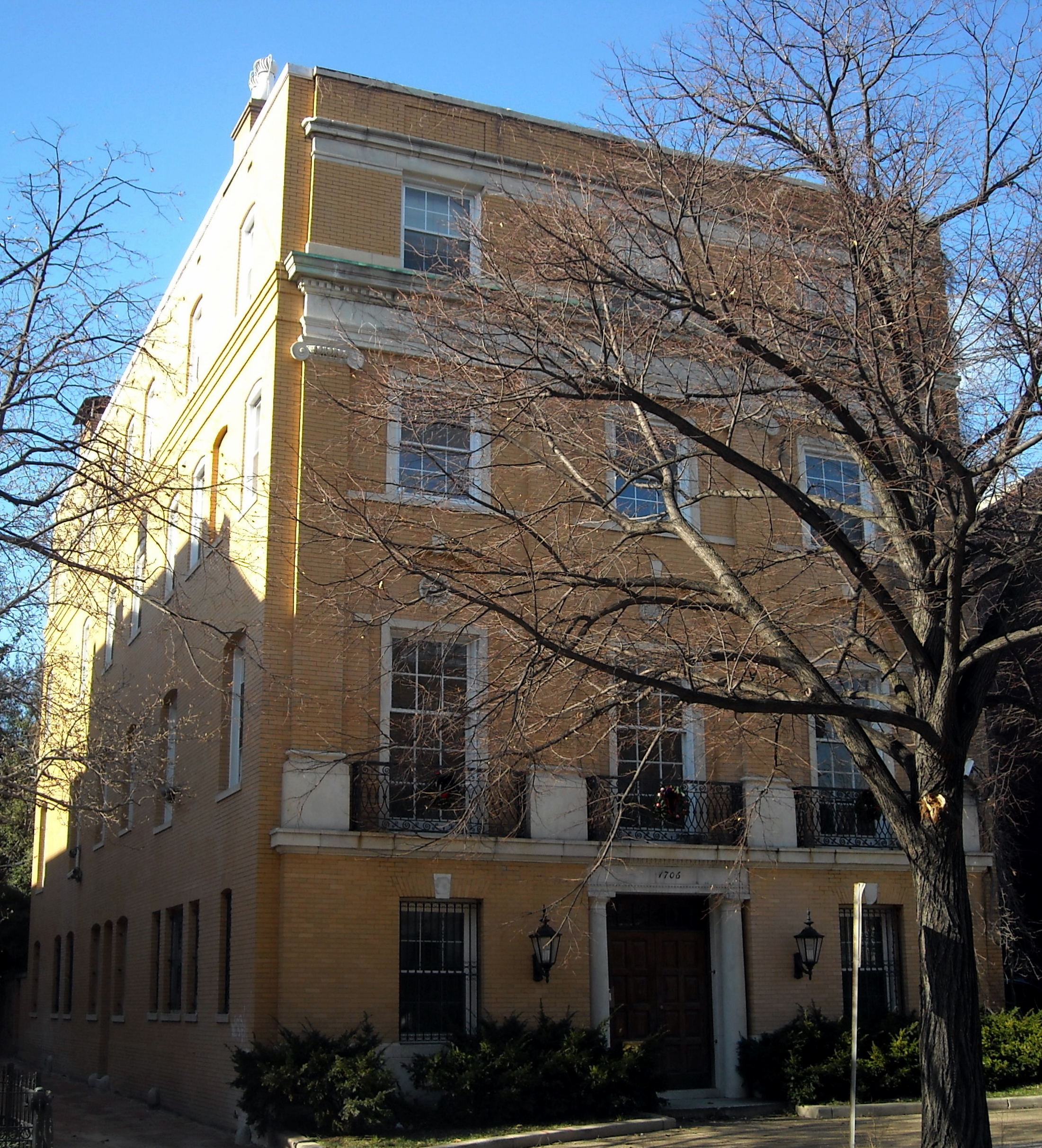
The 1912 home of Margaret Cameron, designed by Jules Henri de Sibour; today the offices of RIA Novosti

- The Black Panther Party had its national headquarter in 2327 18th Street, N. W. in 1971.
- Henry Glassie, a folklorist who also lived at 1743 18th Street, N.W.
- Albert Lasker, advertising executive, and Mary Woodward Lasker, the health activist and philanthropist, also lived at 1706 18th Street
- David A. Reed, a United States Senator from Pennsylvania who also lived at 1706 18th Street
- John W. Weeks, the former United States Secretary of War, U.S. Senator and U.S. Representative, who also lived at 1706 18th Street

== See also ==
- Transportation in Washington, D.C.
