= Thomas P. Morgan =

American poet

- Born: December 1, 1864; East Lyme, Connecticut, USA
- Died: 1928 (aged 63–64)
- Writing career
- Pen name: Tennyson J. Daft
- Genre: Comedy

Thomas P. Morgan (December 1, 1864 - 1928) was an American writer, editor, poet, and columnist.

== Biography ==
Morgan was born in East Lyme, Connecticut to Joseph P. Morgan. He moved to Rogers, Arkansas in 1890. He began his career as an actor and circus clown before moving west and operating a book and stationery business in Rogers, Arkansas.

He wrote for various periodicals including Harper's Magazine, Ladies Home Journal and Puck as well as a playwright. He became nationally known for his comedic tales of country folk life employing quirky characters and vernacular dialogue. He was friendly with Will Rogers and his wife Betty. He sometimes used the pen name Tennyson J. Daft. Morgan also wrote plays but is better known for his humorous short stories. He wrote a daily humor column for the Kansas City Star for many years. He spent his later years in Arkansas.

== Bibliography ==
- Short stories and wit of Tom P. Morgan: Late of Rogers, Arkansas, Compiled by J. Dickson Black
