= Washington Hilton =

Multipurpose hotel in Washington, D.C.

Coordinates: 38.9163°N 77.0452°W

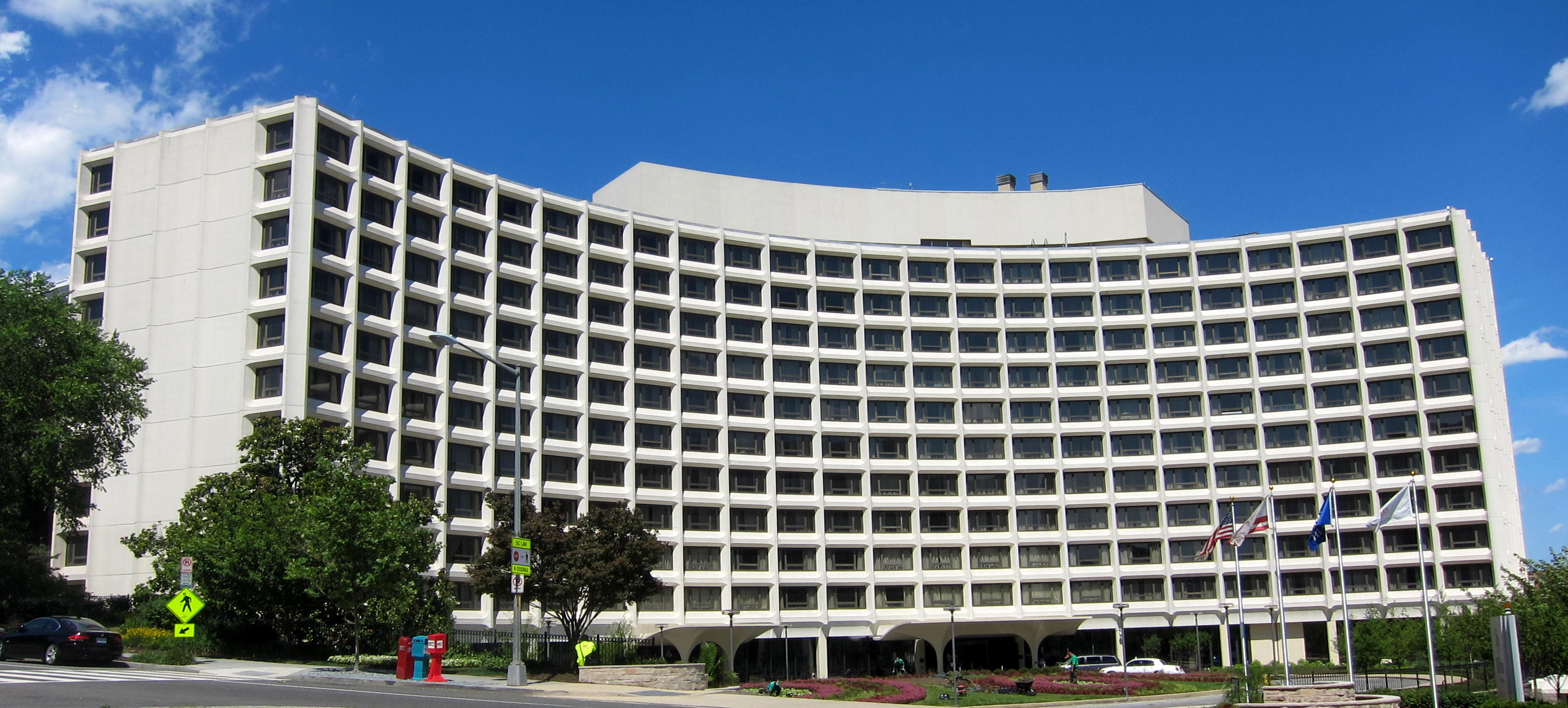
- Washington Hilton in 2010
- Former names: Hilton Washington (1998–2010)
- Alternative names: Hinckley Hilton (Colloquial)

General information
- Location: 1919 Connecticut Avenue, N.W. Washington, D.C.
- Opening: March 25, 1965
- Operator: Hilton Worldwide

Technical details
- Floor count: 12

Design and construction
- Architect: William B. Tabler Architects
- Developer: Uris Buildings Corporation

Other information
- Number of rooms: 1,070
- Number of suites: 47
- Number of restaurants: Four Oaks, McClellan's Sports Bar

Website
- Official website

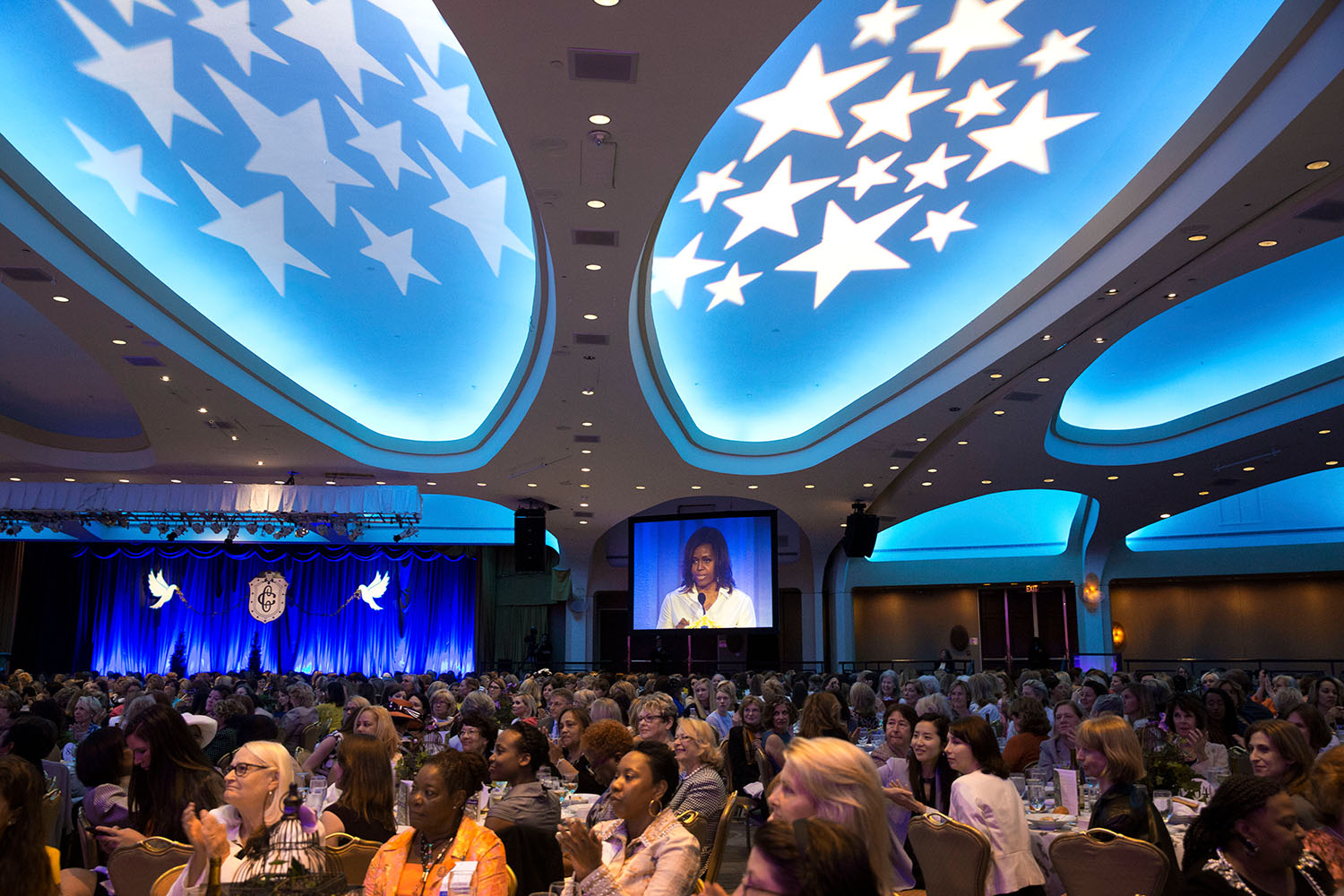
Function Hall in the hotel

The Washington Hilton is a Hilton hotel in Washington, D.C. It is located at 1919 Connecticut Avenue, N.W., roughly at the boundaries of the Kalorama Heights, Dupont Circle, and Adams Morgan neighborhoods. Since its opening in 1965, the hotel has hosted numerous major large events including the annual dinners of the White House Correspondents' Association.

The hotel was the site of the assassination attempt on President Ronald Reagan in 1981, as well as a foiled assassination attempt on the administration of President Donald Trump in 2026.

== History ==
The Washington Hilton, located on the former site of the Oak Lawn estate, was designed by architect William B. Tabler and developed by Uris Buildings Corporation. A groundbreaking ceremony was held on June 25, 1962 and the hotel officially opened three years later, on March 25, 1965. The hotel structure features a distinctive double-arched design. It long sported the largest pillarless hotel ballroom in the city.

Opened less than two years after the assassination of President John F. Kennedy, the ballroom and conference area was built with security for events featuring the United States president in mind, with the cooperation of the Secret Service. That includes a secure corridor for the president and an entrance on T Street that was originally labeled "Presidential Entrance."

Numerous large events have been regularly hosted at the Hilton Washington, including the annual dinners of the White House Correspondents' Association and the Radio and Television Correspondents' Association, Washington Mardi Gras, as well as the National Prayer Breakfast.

During the 1960s and 1970s, the hotel hosted a number of big musical acts for concerts in their large ballroom, including The Doors and Jimi Hendrix. In 1972 it was home to the first International Conference on Computer Communicationsm, which demonstrated new ARPANET technology.

The hotel was renamed the Hilton Washington in 1998. It was purchased in June 2007 by an investment firm involving former professional basketball star Magic Johnson and Lowe Enterprises. From 2009 to 2010 it underwent a $150 million renovation. When that was completed, the hotel returned to its original name.

=== Assassination attempts ===
The hotel was the site of the assassination attempt on President Ronald Reagan by John Hinckley Jr. on March 30, 1981. Reagan was seriously wounded but survived. The attempt occurred at the hotel's T Street NW exit. As a result, the hotel is sometimes colloquially called the Hinckley Hilton by locals.

On April 25, 2026, Cole Tomas Allen attempted to assassinate officials in the administration of President Donald Trump during the White House Correspondents' Dinner. Allen failed to reach the dinner before he was arrested, and no officials were injured.

== See also ==
- List of Brutalist architecture in the United States
