= Florida Avenue =

Street in Washington, DC

- Florida Avenue NW; Florida Avenue NE
- The 1791 L'Enfant Plan, under which Boundary Street (now Florida Avenue) marked the northern limits of Washington, D.C. from Rock Creek in the west to 15th Street in the northeast
- Interactive map of Florida Avenue
- Former name: Boundary Street
- Maintained by: DDOT
- Location: Washington, D.C., U.S.
- West end: Massachusetts Avenue
- Major junctions: Connecticut Avenue; U / 18th Streets NW; 16th Street NW; US 29 (Georgia Avenue to the north, 7th Street NW to the south); US 1 (Rhode Island Avenue NW); North Capitol Street; US 50 (New York Avenue NE)
- East end: Starburst Plaza

Construction
- Commissioned: 1791
- Completed: 1818

Florida Avenue is a major street in Washington, D.C., United States. It was originally named Boundary Street, because it formed the northern boundary of the Federal City under the 1791 L'Enfant Plan. With the growth of the city beyond its original borders, Boundary Street was renamed Florida Avenue in 1890.

== History ==
On July 9, 1790, Congress passed the Residence Act, which approved the creation of a national capital on the Potomac River. The exact location was to be selected by President George Washington, who chose a portion of the states of Maryland and Virginia on January 24, 1791. Originally, government officials did not foresee that the city of Washington would expand to fill the boundaries of the entire District of Columbia. The "Federal City", or City of Washington, originally lay within an area bounded by Boundary Street (northwest and northeast), 15th Street Northeast, East Capitol Street, the Anacostia River, the Potomac River, and Rock Creek.

Boundary Street was drawn to follow the foot of the hilly terrain of Northwest Washington, D.C. The hilly area is the Wicomico-Sunderland Escarpment, which is part of the Atlantic Seaboard fall line. The escarpment helps mark the transition between the Appalachian Piedmont region north of the avenue and the flat Atlantic Coastal Plain terrain of the city's downtown area to the south.

The first section of Boundary Street to be opened was between North Capitol Street and 2nd Street NE in 1818. By 1828, the street extended westward at least to 19th Street NW. Boundary Street was graded in late 1869 and early 1870, which dropped the street some 7 to 8 feet (2.1 to 2.4 m) in places.

Boundary Street was renamed Florida Avenue on January 14, 1890, by a decision of the Board of Commissioners. The Washington Post reported the next day that the Commissioners had received numerous complaints by property owners that the name of Boundary Street had depressed the value of their land.

Later that year, the Rock Creek Railway opened electric streetcar service on a quarter-mile of track along Florida Avenue NW from Connecticut Avenue to 18th Street NW. In 1899, as the city's streetcar system developed, service along this stretch of Florida was discontinued and the track removed.

=== 21st century ===
In the 2010s, high-profile pedestrian and cyclist deaths on Florida Avenue NE prompted traffic safety discussions about the area, whose sidewalks and other infrastructure along this stretch do not meet modern ADA and safety requirements. A 2015 report by the District Department of Transportation brought few immediate changes, but renewed pressure in spring 2019 brought announcements of some plans for improvements.

== Route description ==
The western terminus of Florida Avenue is at Massachusetts Avenue NW, 22nd Street NW, and Q Street NW. From that terminus to 9th Street NW, Florida Avenue follows a winding path due to the city's topography. From 9th Street NW, Florida Avenue follows a straight line to its eastern terminus at the "Starburst intersection" of H Street NE, 15th Street NE, Maryland Avenue NE, Benning Road NE, and Bladensburg Road NE.

== Adjacent neighborhoods ==
Florida Avenue helps to define several neighborhoods in the District of Columbia. In the northwest quadrant, it forms one of the borders of the Columbia Heights neighborhood (which straddles 16th Street NW) along with Columbia Road NW. Florida Avenue also forms the boundary between Adams Morgan to the north and Dupont Circle to the south, helping to connect the major thoroughfares of Connecticut Avenue NW and 16th Street NW, and forms the northern boundary of the 18th Street NW shopping corridor. It also connects Adams Morgan and Dupont Circle with the Shaw neighborhood and the U Street retail and entertainment corridor. Heading east toward North Capitol Street, Florida Avenue borders LeDroit Park and Bloomingdale to the north, and Truxton Circle to the south.

In the northeast quadrant, Florida Avenue serves as the demarcation between the Eckington, Gallaudet University and Trinidad neighborhoods to the north, with NoMa and H Street/Atlas District to the south (also known as Near Northeast).

== Landmarks ==
Gallaudet University, the American national university for the deaf, is located at 800 Florida Avenue NE. The campus consists of a unique collection of Victorian and Queen Anne style buildings on grounds with a landscape design by Frederick Law Olmsted. The Florida Avenue Grill, located at 1100 Florida Avenue NW, opened in 1944 and is a historic restaurant in the city.

Union Market and the adjacent retail strip anchor several blocks along the north side of northeast Florida Avenue, just west of Gallaudet University.

Former landmarks on Florida Avenue include Henderson Castle, a massive red sandstone mansion built at the corner of Florida Avenue and 16th Street NW in 1889 for Senator John B. Henderson. The mansion was razed in 1949, although the retaining wall and gates have survived. Another former landmark was Holmead's Burying Ground, located on Florida Avenue between 19th and 20th Streets. Founded in 1796, it was the city's most prominent cemetery for the first 50 years of the 19th century. It was closed in 1874, and the bodies removed over the next decade. Griffith Stadium, also known as Boundary Stadium (for Boundary Street), was a major league baseball stadium bounded by Florida Avenue NW, W Street NW, Georgia Avenue NW, and 5th Street NW. Built in 1911, it was torn down in 1965.

Where Florida Avenue intersects New York Avenue is colloquially referred to as "Dave Thomas Circle".

== Bibliography ==
- Bednar, Michael J. (2006). L'Enfant's Legacy: Public Open Spaces in Washington, D.C. Baltimore, Md.: Johns Hopkins University Press. ISBN 0801883180.
- Blaney, Joseph R.; Lippert, Lance R.; Smith, J. Scott (2013). Repairing the Athlete's Image: Studies in Sports Image Restoration. Lanham, Md.: Lexington Books. ISBN 9780739138960.
- Brown, Jules; Dickey, Jeff (2008). The Rough Guide to Washington, D.C. London: Rough Guides. ISBN 9781858280530.
- Council of the City of Washington (1829). Laws of the Corporation of the City of Washington Passed by the Twenty-Sixth Council. Washington, D.C.: Way and Gideon.
- Council of the City of Washington (1818). Laws Passed by the Fifteenth Council of the City of Washington. Washington, D.C.: A. and G. Way.
- Evelyn, Douglas; Dickson, Paul; Ackerman, S.J. (2008). On This Spot: Pinpointing the Past in Washington, D.C. Sterling, Va.: Capital Books. ISBN 9781933102702.
- DeFerrari, John (2013). Historic Restaurants of Washington, D.C.: Capital Eats. Charleston, S.C.: American Palate. ISBN 9781626191266.
- Hansen, Stephen A. (2014). History of Dupont Circle: Center of High Society in the Capital. Charleston, S.C.: The History Press. ISBN 9781626195646.
- Gutheim, Frederick; Lee, Antoinette (2006). Worthy of the Nation: Washington, D.C., from L'Enfant to the National Capital Planning Commission. Baltimore, Md.: Johns Hopkins University Press. ISBN 9780801883286.
- Hagner, Alexander (1904). "Street Nomenclature of Washington City". Records of the Columbia Historical Society: 237–261.
- Hawkins, Don Alexander (Spring–Summer 1991). "The Landscape of the Federal City: A 1792 Walking Tour". Washington History: 10–33.
- Kelly, Charles Suddarth (1984). Washington, D.C., Then and Now. New York: Dover Publishing. ISBN 9780486245867.
- Pippenger, Wesley E. (2004). Dead People On the Move!. Westminster, Md.: Willow Bend Books. ISBN 0788431943.
- Wang, Amy B.; Lombardi, Matthew; Duecy, Erica; Bohman, Mary Beth (2007). Fodor's '07 Washington, D.C. New York: Fodor's. ISBN 9781400017195.
- Whitman, William B. (2007). Washington, D.C.: Off the Beaten Path. Guilford, Conn.: Insiders' Guide. ISBN 9780762742172.
