= Columbia Road =

Major street in Washington, D.C.

Coordinates: 38°55′28.4″N 77°2′23.2″W

- Columbia Road Northwest
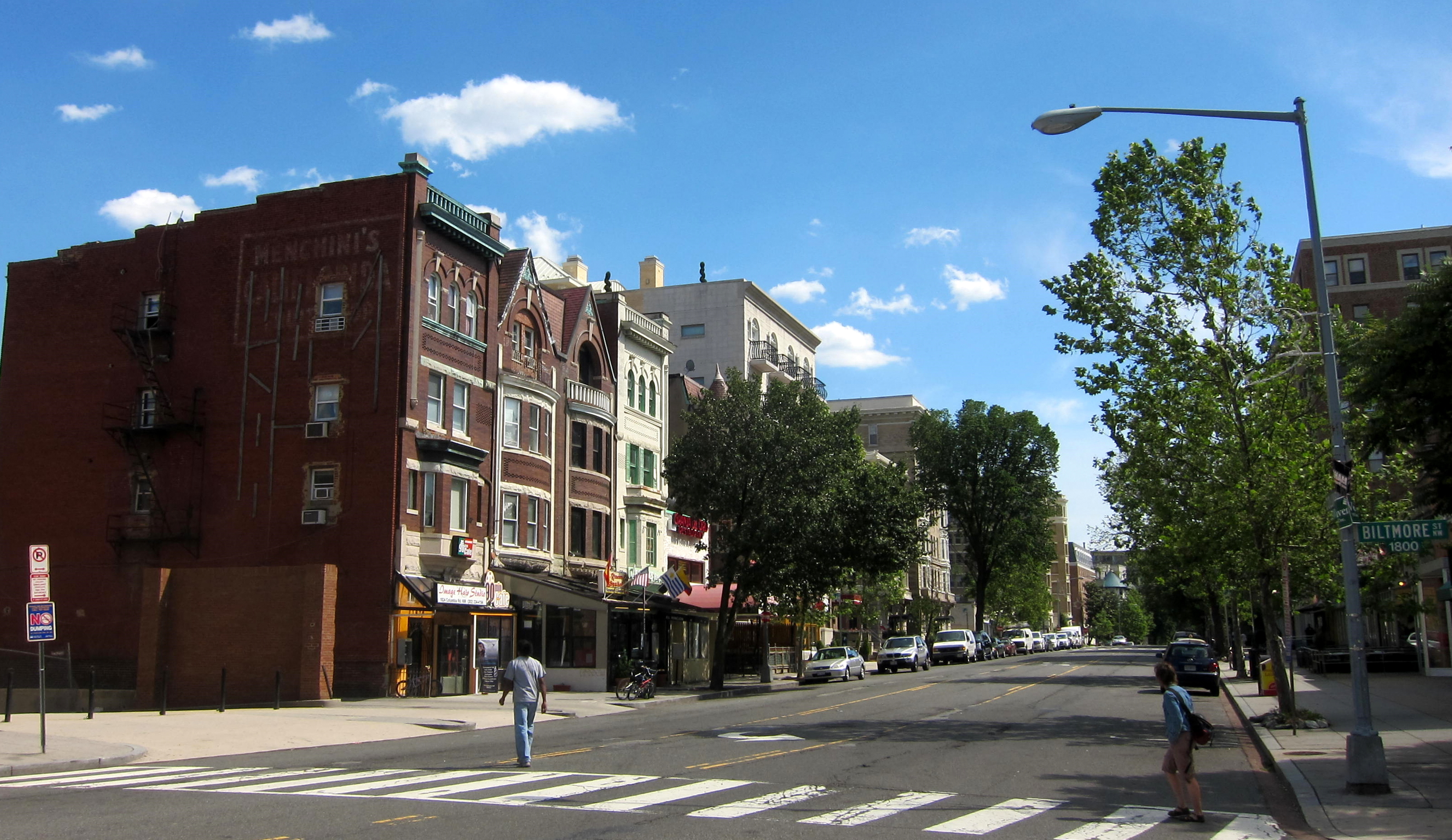
- Facing south on the 1800 block in Adams Morgan
- Interactive map of Columbia Road
- Maintained by: DDOT
- Length: 1.9 mi (3.1 km)
- Location: Washington, D.C.
- West end: Connecticut Avenue in Adams Morgan
- Major junctions: US 29 (Georgia Avenue) in Park View
- East end: Michigan Avenue / Irving Street in Park View
- North: Irving Street
- South: Harvard Street

Columbia Road is a street in Washington, D.C., that forks from Connecticut Avenue north of Dupont Circle, and branches north and east through 16th Street to the McMillan Reservoir. Along its route, it marks the southern border of the Kalorama Triangle neighborhood, the principal east/west passage through the Adams Morgan neighborhood, and is one of the primary thoroughfares in the Columbia Heights neighborhood. In Adams Morgan, it is bordered by a great deal of street-level retail, constituting (with 18th Street) the main commercial area within Adams Morgan.

== History ==
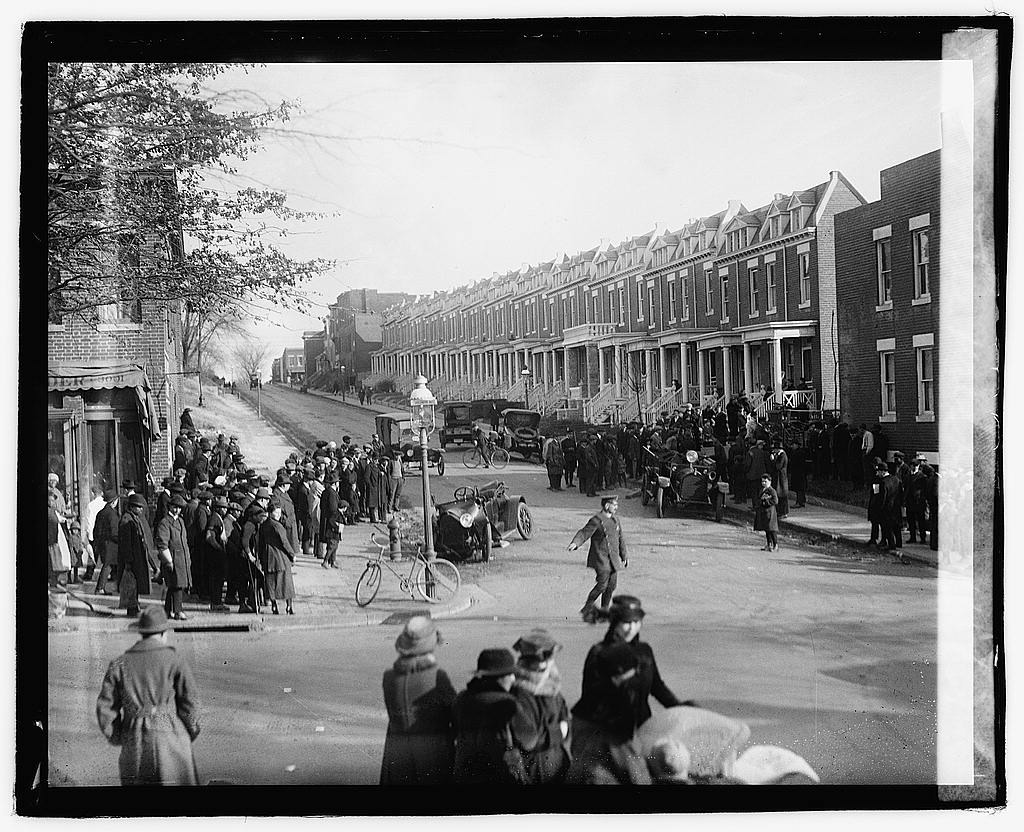
Columbia Road in 1921

Much like the neighborhood of Columbia Heights, Columbia Road was not in fact named for the District, but rather for Columbian College, which would go on to be renamed to the present-day George Washington University.

Previously located on Columbia Road, the Knickerbocker Theatre was a famous cinema built in 1917, and the site of a major disaster five years later when it collapsed during a blizzard, killing 98 and injuring 133 more.
