= Sheridan-Kalorama Historic District =

- U.S. National Register of Historic Places
- U.S. Historic district
- D.C. Inventory of Historic Sites
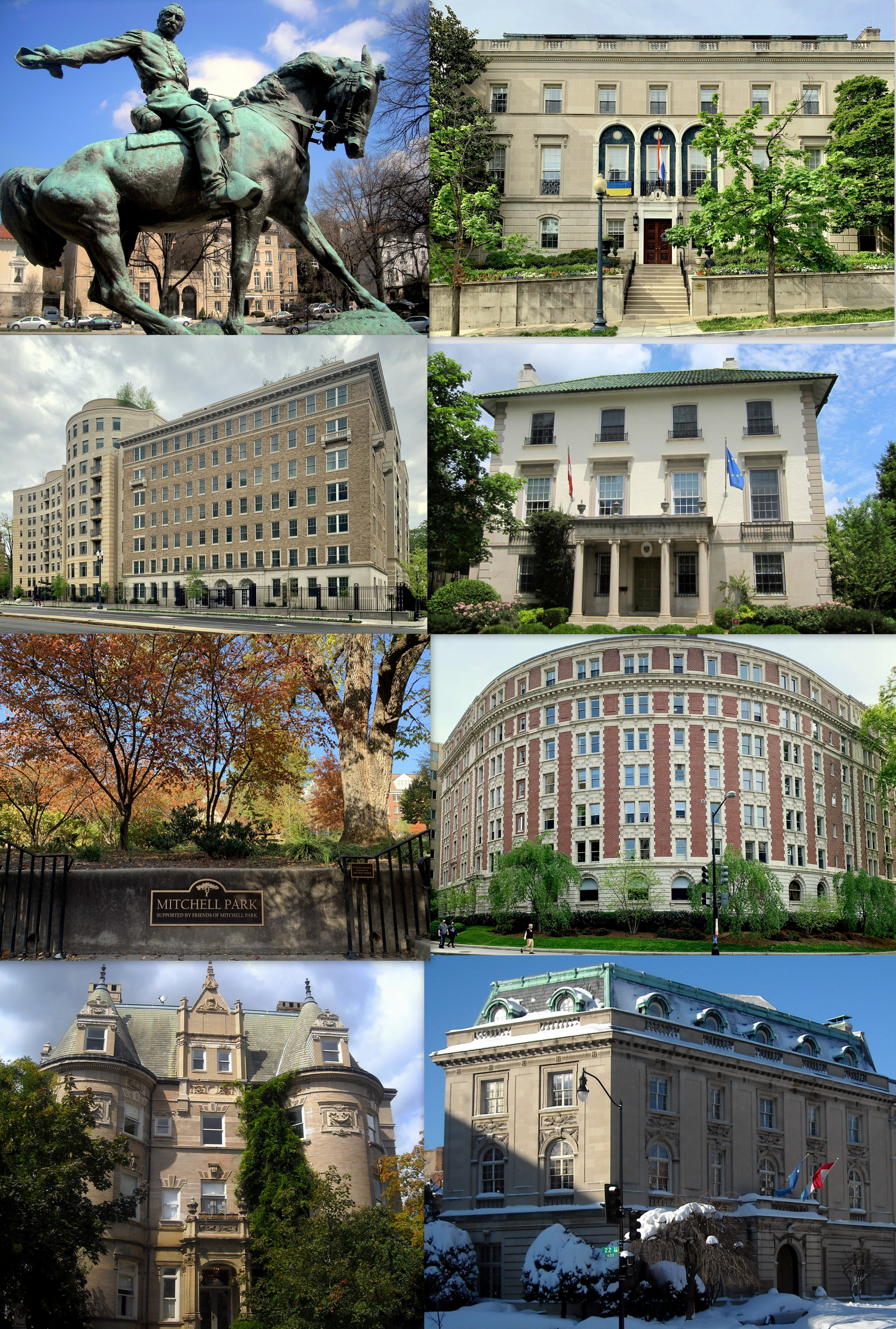
- (left to right) Equestrian statue of Philip Sheridan, Dutch ambassadorial residence, Embassy of China's staff residence, Austrian ambassadorial residence, Mitchell Park, The Dresden, Miller House, Embassy of Luxembourg
- Location: Roughly bounded by Rock Creek Park, Connecticut Avenue, Florida Avenue, 22nd Street, and P Street; Washington, D.C., U.S.
- Coordinates: 38°54′56.6″N 77°3′2.7″W
- Area: 190 acres (77 ha)
- NRHP reference No.: 89001743

Significant dates
- Added to NRHP: October 30, 1989
- Designated DCIHS: September 25, 1989

The Sheridan-Kalorama Historic District is a neighborhood and historic district located in the northwest quadrant of Washington, D.C. The boundaries of the historic district include Rock Creek Park to the north and west, P Street to the south, and 22nd Street and Florida Avenue to the east. On the southwestern edge of the neighborhood is a stretch of Embassy Row on Massachusetts Avenue. The other neighborhood and historic district that lies to the east of Sheridan-Kalorama is Kalorama Triangle Historic District. The two neighborhoods are divided by Connecticut Avenue. For many years both neighborhoods were geographically connected before the stretch of Connecticut Avenue was installed toward the Taft Bridge. Oftentimes, both neighborhoods are simply called "Kalorama" or "Kalorama Heights".

There are two traffic circles in Sheridan-Kalorama: Kalorama Circle and Sheridan Circle. The latter is a park centered on the equestrian statue of General Philip Sheridan. The name "Kalorama" means "fine view" in Greek. There are several parks in Sheridan-Kalorama, including Mitchell Park and the Ukrainian Independence Park. A large number of buildings and sites in the neighborhood are listed on the National Register of Historic Places (NRHP) and District of Columbia Inventory of Historic Sites (DCIHS). Four of these buildings are National Historic Landmarks and over 600 structures are contributing properties to the Sheridan-Kalorama Historic District, which was listed on the NRHP and DCIHS in 1989.

The original inhabitants of present-day Sheridan-Kalorama were the Nacotchtank and Mattawoman tribes. During the 17th century, Sheridan-Kalorama was part of a large estate, named Widow's Mite. Various portions of the land were sold throughout the years, and a large house built in the area was named Belair. The house was renamed Kalorama by Joel Barlow in the early 19th century. The house was commandeered during the Civil War and caught fire in 1865. Due to a sharp increase of the city's population after the war, people began looking beyond the city's boundary, as Sheridan-Kalorama was part of Washington County, D.C., at the time. Some of the lots during this time were developed for housing, often large homes for wealthy people, intellectuals, and high-ranking government and military officials. The District of Columbia Organic Act of 1871 moved the city's boundary to its current size, thus Sheridan-Kalorama joined Washington, D.C.

After Connecticut Avenue was extended north of Florida Avenue, streetcars lines were installed on the road, drawing more people to buy or build houses in the surrounding area. Speculative real estate in the neighborhood began in the 1890s, as ornate rowhouses were built along the neighborhood's main streets. Unlike Kalorama Triangle, which mostly catered to the middle-class, Sheridan-Kalorama catered to the upper-class. The houses in Sheridan-Kalorama were larger and more grand. Some of these rowhouses and the older homes were demolished and replaced with large apartment buildings. One of the most popular architectural styles built in early 20th-century Sheridan-Kalorama was Colonial Revival, although many other styles are represented in the neighborhood. Decatur Circle was renamed Sheridan Circle and large palatial homes were built in the immediate area.

During the Great Depression, many of the mansions and ornate rowhouses were sold to foreign governments. This process has continued for decades and the neighborhood is home to dozens of embassies, ambassadorial residences, and other diplomatic buildings. Many of them are located along Embassy Row or on streets near it. By 1993, almost 200 buildings in the neighborhood were used as diplomatic offices or residences. The neighborhood has attracted these nations due to the prestige and quiet suburban-like setting. Six U.S. presidents have lived in Sheridan-Kalorama, including Barack Obama. Other notable figures who have lived in the neighborhood include justices of the U.S. Supreme Court, members of Congress, presidential secretaries, and military leaders.

== Geography ==
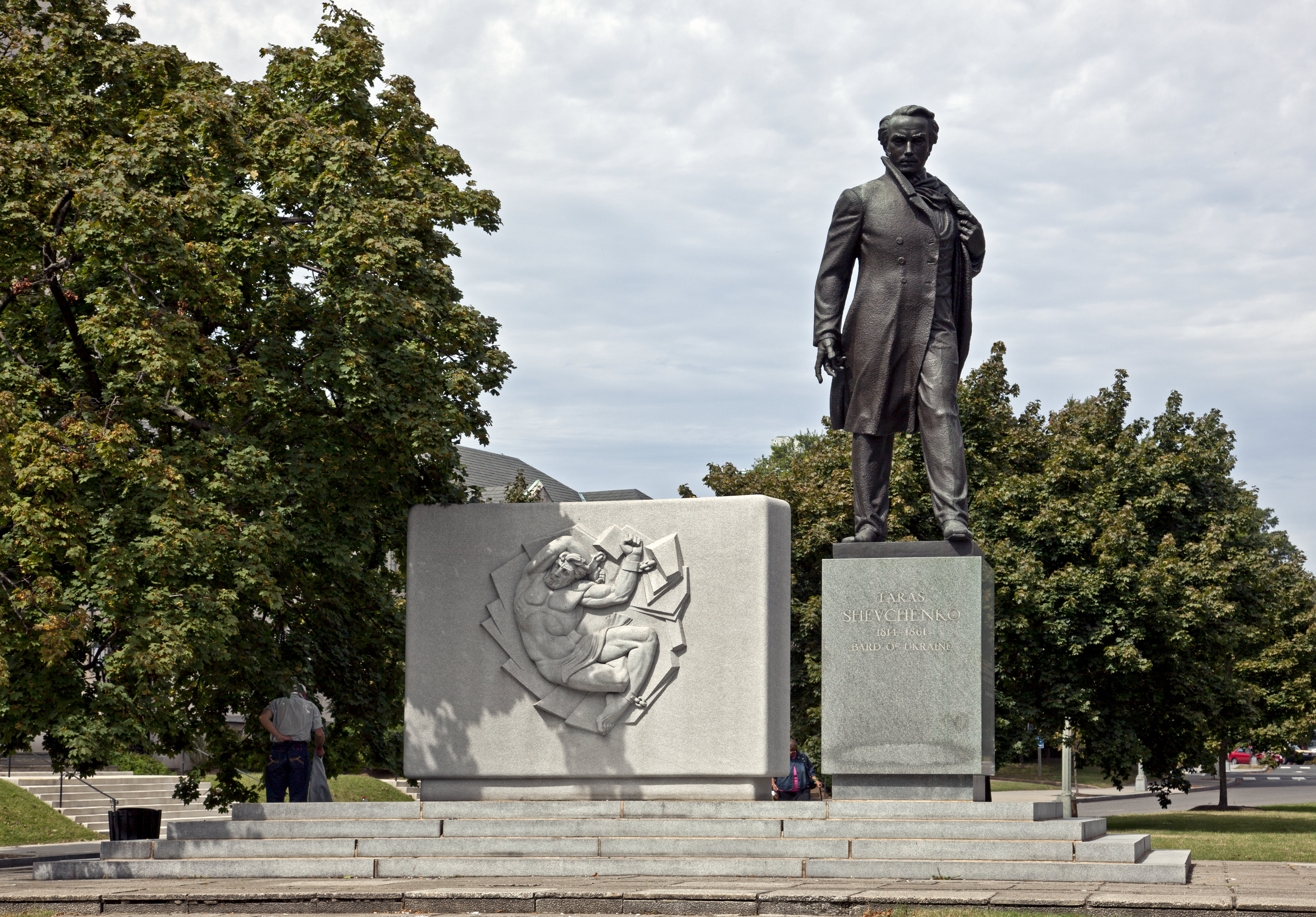
The Taras Shevchenko Memorial in Ukrainian Independence Park

The Sheridan-Kalorama Historic District encompasses the entire 190 acres (77 ha) Sheridan-Kalorama neighborhood, located in the northwest quadrant of Washington, D.C. The rough boundaries of the historic district are Rock Creek Park to the north and west, P Street to the south, and 22nd Street and Florida Avenue to the east. The surrounding neighborhoods are also historic districts, Dupont Circle to the south and east, and Kalorama Triangle to the northeast.

Massachusetts Avenue, another historic district, bisects the neighborhood from the south to the northwest. The properties along the west side of Massachusetts Avenue abut Rock Creek Park. Like many other neighborhoods outside the original 1791 L'Enfant Plan, some of the roads in Sheridan-Kalorama do not share the same grid pattern.

In addition to the major roads marking the boundary, the primary roads in Sheridan-Kalorama are 23rd Street, 24th Street, California Street, Kalorama Road, S Street, and Wyoming Avenue. There is one residential circle, Kalorama Circle, on the northern edge of the district, and Sheridan Circle on the southern edge. There are a few parks in the district, including the largest, Mitchell Park, as well as Robert Emmet Memorial Park, Sheridan Circle park, and the Ukrainian Independence Park.

Lots on the southern portion of the historic district tend to be flat, while the land gradually rises the further north one goes in the neighborhood. The highest point is at Mitchell Park and the surrounding lots. The land drops sharply behind the properties on Massachusetts Avenue, Belmont Road, Kalorama Circle, and Kalorama Road, due to the geography of Rock Creek Park.

== History ==
=== 17th and 18th centuries ===
The area now known as Sheridan-Kalorama was originally inhabited by Native American tribes, the Nacotchtank and Mattawoman. During the 17th century, they came into conflict with white settlers moving to the area. One of the settlers, John Langworth, had been given a 600 acres (240 ha) tract of land in 1663 by Charles II of England. The tract was later called Widow's Mite and owned by the Anthony Holmead family at some point in the late 18th or early 19th century. The land was located outside the boundaries of the District of Columbia, and was a part of Maryland for many years.

Anthony Holmead II emigrated from England to the U.S., to take possession of the land his uncle owned. He built two houses, one called Rock Hill located around 23rd and S Streets, where he raised a large family. In 1791, the City of Washington was laid out, but its furthest reach going north was Boundary Street (now Florida Avenue). The neighborhood became part of Washington County, D.C. at that time. Holmead sold his house and a portion of his land in 1794, moving just to the east of his former land. The new owner, Gustavus Scott, called his estate Belair, but overspent while trying to improve the estate. He sold two portion of his land, which soon became the site of a paper mill and grist mill.

=== 19th century ===
==== Early residents ====
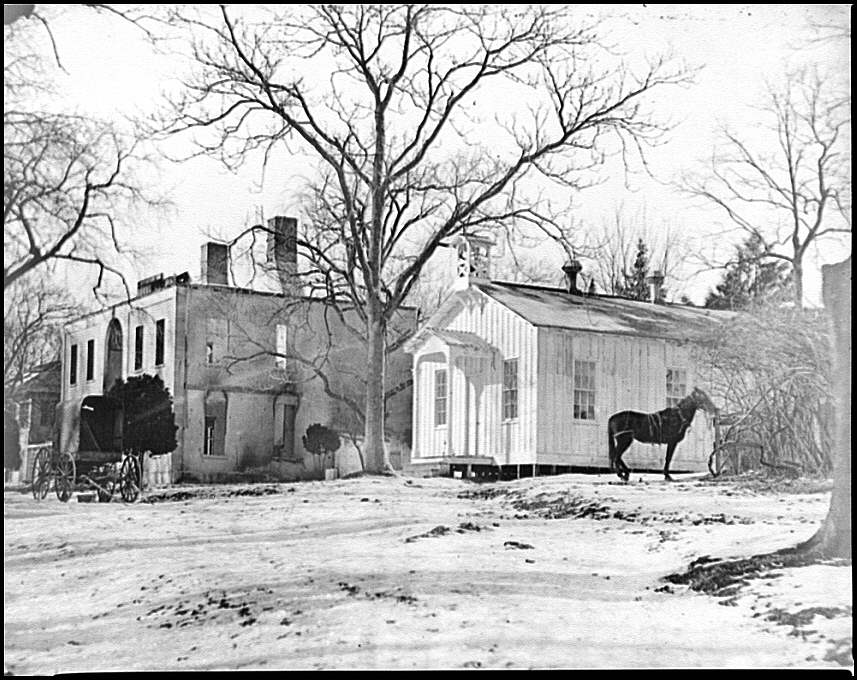
The Kalorama house after a fire gutted it in 1865. The house had been used as a smallpox hospital during the Civil War.

Scott died in 1803 and the next owner of Belair was politician William Augustine Washington, nephew of George Washington. He only owned the land for a few years before selling it to poet Joel Barlow, who renamed the estate Kalorama, which means "fine view" in Greek. Barlow improved the estate and built a second house on the highest portion of his land. The original house was renovated and expanded following the designs of Barlow's friend, Benjamin Henry Latrobe. Barlow had many influential people visit his estate, including President Thomas Jefferson and inventor Robert Fulton.

Barlow died while on a trip to Europe, and his widow, Ruth, continued living in their house with her sister and brother-in-law Colonel George Bomford. After Ruth's death, the property was passed on to her brother, Associate Justice of the Supreme Court Henry Baldwin. Bomford bought the property and some of the surrounding land, owning it until 1846. The next owner of Kalorama, Thomas R. Lovett, purchased the property for his mother. At this time, the Holmeads were still neighbors living on the adjoining property to the east.

Kalorama was commandeered by the Union Army during the Civil War and used as a smallpox hospital. This continued until 1865 when a fire destroyed the house. The site where Kalorama once stood is now Mitchell Park. After the war ended, there was a large increase of people moving to Washington, D.C., and with them the need for additional homes and apartments. Between 1865 and 1880, an increasing amount of lots were sold, resulting in the loss of previous vast estates. One of the most prominent residences built during this time was an octagonal house where former Ohio Governor William Bebb lived. The house remained until 1949 when it was demolished.

==== Development begins ====
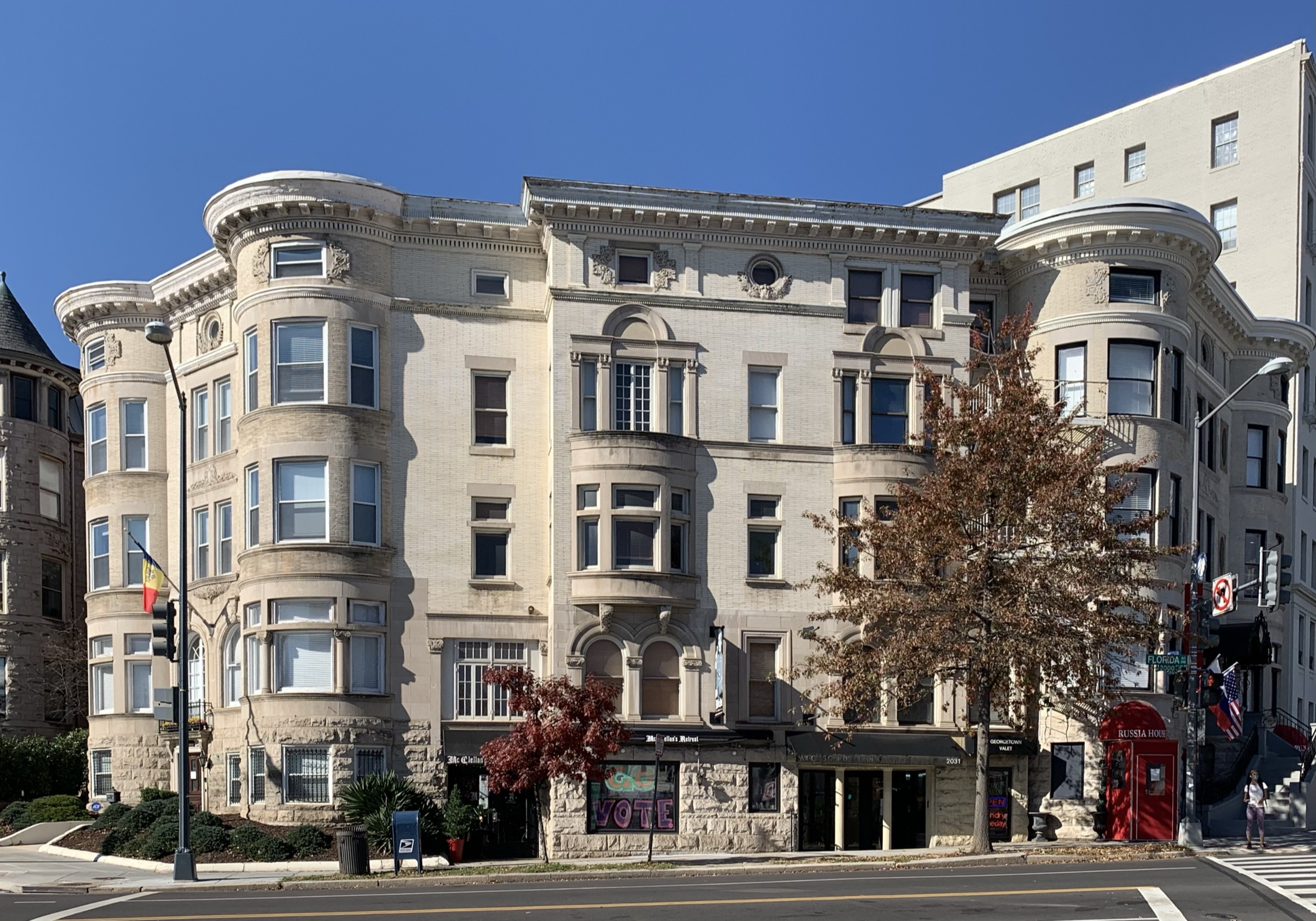
Houses on the corner of Connecticut and Florida Avenues NW built in 1896

After the District of Columbia Organic Act of 1871 was passed, Washington County became part of the District of Columbia. Improvements were made to transportation routes and sewer lines were installed north of Boundary Street. Massachusetts Avenue was extended past Boundary Street, before gradually making a sharp turn going northwest along modern-day Embassy Row. Development rapidly occurred in Dupont Circle, and gradually reached farther north to Kalorama Triangle when streetcars were installed along the new portion of Columbia Road and Connecticut Avenue.

Even though rowhouses were being constructed at a rapid pace in Dupont Circle, most of Sheridan-Kalorama was still rural, except for the few landowners who had not sold their properties to developers. Land value tripled as development moved north, and most of old Sheridan-Kalorama was platted and divided into lots. Local officials announced in 1886 that a bridge would be built on Massachusetts Avenue crossing Rock Creek. Despite this, houses were not being constructed at the expected pace. Kalorama Triangle grew before Sheridan-Kalorama, thanks to the two streetcar lines commuters could ride.

Extending Connecticut Avenue north of Boundary Street to a planned bridge crossing Rock Creek divided Kalorama Triangle from Sheridan-Kalorama, then known as Kalorama Heights. The latter was to be the preferred neighborhood for wealthier residents, while Kalorama Triangle was composed of mostly middle class residents. Although the interior of Sheridan-Kalorama remained undeveloped, except for the lots near the streetcar line on Connecticut Avenue, the lots along Massachusetts Avenue quickly developed with large, elaborate houses.

By the late 1890s, speculative housing was constructed in the interior of the neighborhood, along S Street, Wyoming Avenue, Leroy Place, and Bancroft Place. Examples include stand-alone houses on Wyoming Avenue, California Street, and Kalorama Road, built in 1892. One of these houses is now the Embassy of North Macedonia. Typical rowhouses were also built in the 1890s, including ones along 22nd Street, Florida Avenue, Q Street, and R Street.

=== 20th century ===
==== Continued development ====
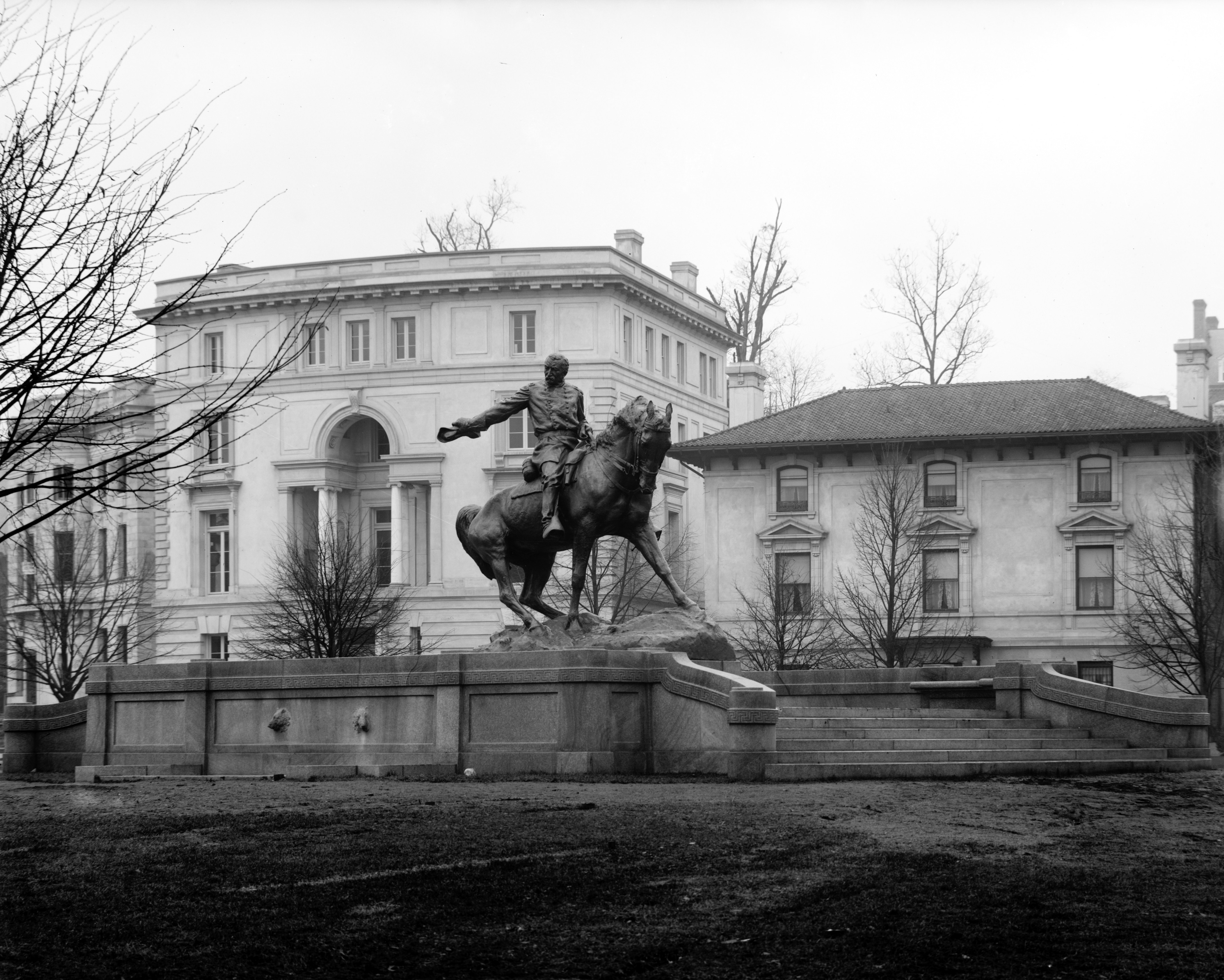
The equestrian statue of Philip Sheridan in the 1910s

Development in the early 20th century permanently changed the character of the neighborhood. Estates spread out over the Sheridan-Kalorama area were purchased, the land plotted, and new suburban-like homes were built. The two neighborhoods partially sharing the same name were divided due to changes in the road layout. By 1900, there were 114 structures in the neighborhood, representing almost 20 percent of houses that remain today. In 1901, a stone bridge was installed carrying Massachusetts Avenue over Rock Creek. That bridge was later replaced in the early 1940's with the current Charles C. Glover Memorial Bridge.

While Kalorama Triangle catered to the middle-class with rowhouses and apartment buildings, Sheridan-Kalorama included apartment buildings, large stand-alone houses, places of worship, schools, and embassies. Land in Sheridan-Kalorama was triple the value of an already built rowhouse in other parts of the city. The palatial homes built along Massachusetts Avenue during the early 20th century set the tone of the neighborhood's other areas. Ornate, larger rowhouses were built in Sheridan-Kalorama, catered to the upper class, with houses designed by local and national architects. Most of the early households in Sheridan-Kalorama consisted of a husband, wife, children, and one servant, or sometimes more servants depending on the house size. This changed within several years due to large houses being built that required multiple servants. Amongst the people living in the neighborhood were diplomats, members of Congress, lawyers, journalists, and military officers.

Several houses built in the 1880s and 1890s were demolished and replaced with grander residences. Some of these buildings torn down were previously owned by noted figures, including Supreme Court Chief Justice Charles Evans Hughes and Speaker of the House of Representatives Champ Clark. Many of the neighborhood's rowhouses located near Connecticut Avenue were demolished and replaced with large apartment buildings. Throughout the neighborhood, new houses were often designed in the Colonial Revival style. Additional architectural styles popular during the neighborhood's growth include Federal, Georgian Revival, Beaux-Arts, Romanesque Revival, and Mediterranean Revival.

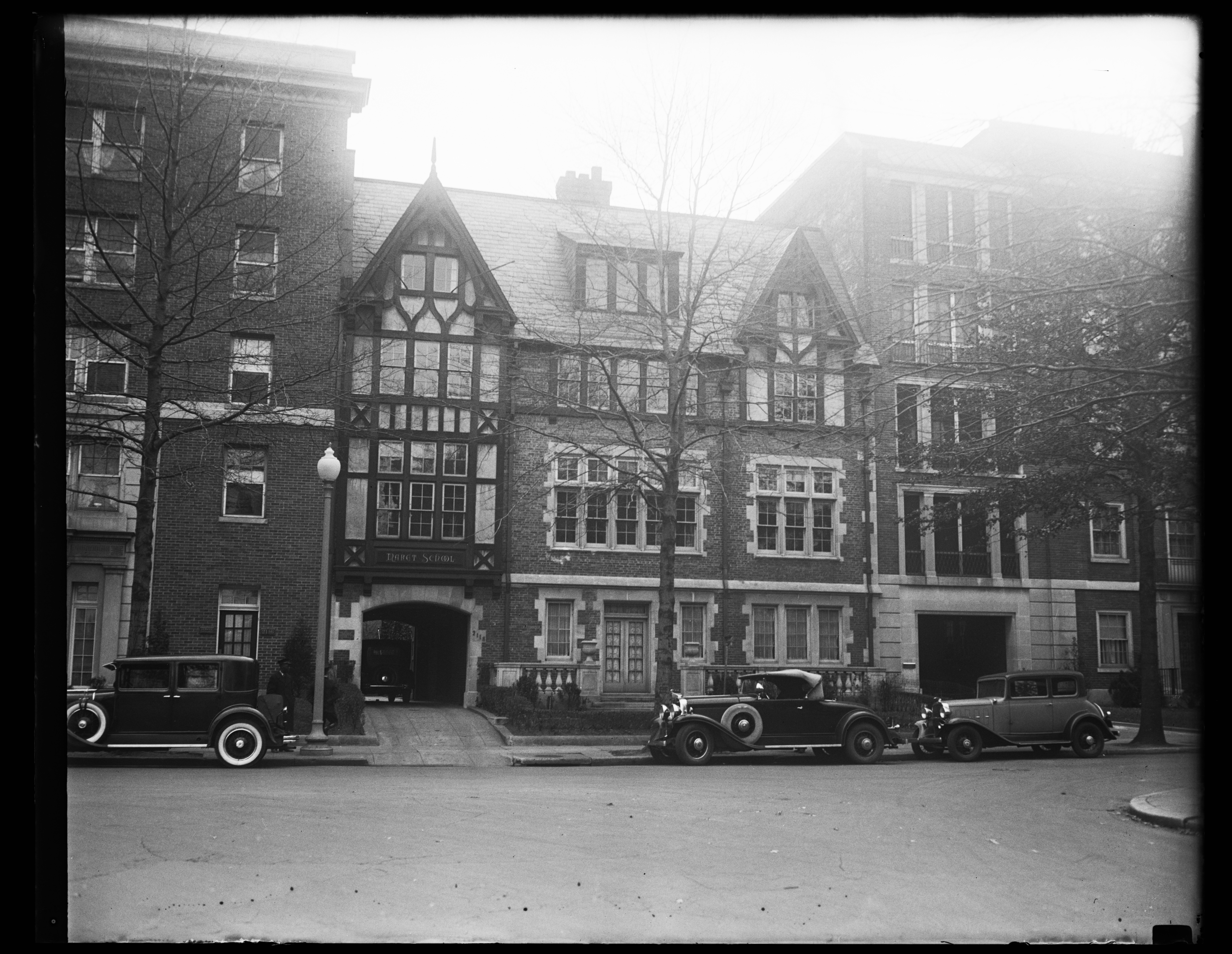
Maret School in 1933

By this time, Decatur Circle had been renamed Sheridan Circle, in honor of the Civil War hero whose statue stands in the middle of the circle. Thus, the first half of the neighborhood's name was changed. Sheridan-Kalorama had become a distinct neighborhood, with subtle differences between Dupont Circle, including house sizes, and commercial developments. The only commercial building in Sheridan-Kalorama is 2160-2162 California Street.

By 1914, the neighborhood included scores of new houses, representing 45 percent of the extant buildings. The last of the rowhouses typically found in other local neighborhoods, 2224-2238 Decatur Place, were built in 1904. The remaining rowhouses built in the 1900s were much larger and more ornate. A movement to building larger houses or apartment buildings became popular during the early 20th century. During the 1900s, there were seven apartment buildings constructed in the neighborhood. Due to the building sizes, the majority of Sheridan-Kalorama residents lived in apartment buildings by World War I. By 1940, there were 30 apartment buildings in Sheridan-Kalorama. Examples include the first apartment building constructed in the neighborhood, The Highlands, in addition to The Dresden, the St Nicholas, and Windsor Lodge.

In addition to residential buildings, there were also schools, including The Field School, the Landon School, the Holton-Arms School, the Potomac School, and the Maret School, all of which have since relocated or closed. Places of worship in the neighborhood that were built in the late 19th century and 20th century include St. Margaret's Episcopal Church, the Church of the Pilgrims, the Friends Meeting House, the Fazl Mosque and the imposing Islamic Center of Washington.

As the 20th century progressed, many of the neighborhood's houses were sold to foreign governments. The British embassy relocated from Dupont Circle to a lot along Massachusetts Avenue, northwest of Sheridan-Kalorama. The first nation to buy a lot for an embassy or ambassadorial residence in Sheridan-Kalorama was France, when it purchased land on S Street between 22nd and 23rd Streets. Up until that time, there were only four embassies in the city, as most countries rented space in existing buildings. Germany purchased land on what is now Mitchell Park, across the street from the French. This made for awkward relations during World War I, which may be why neither country built anything and sold the properties. Other countries though began purchasing the neighborhood's residences. The first purpose-built embassy constructed in the neighborhood was the Embassy of Siam (now Thailand).

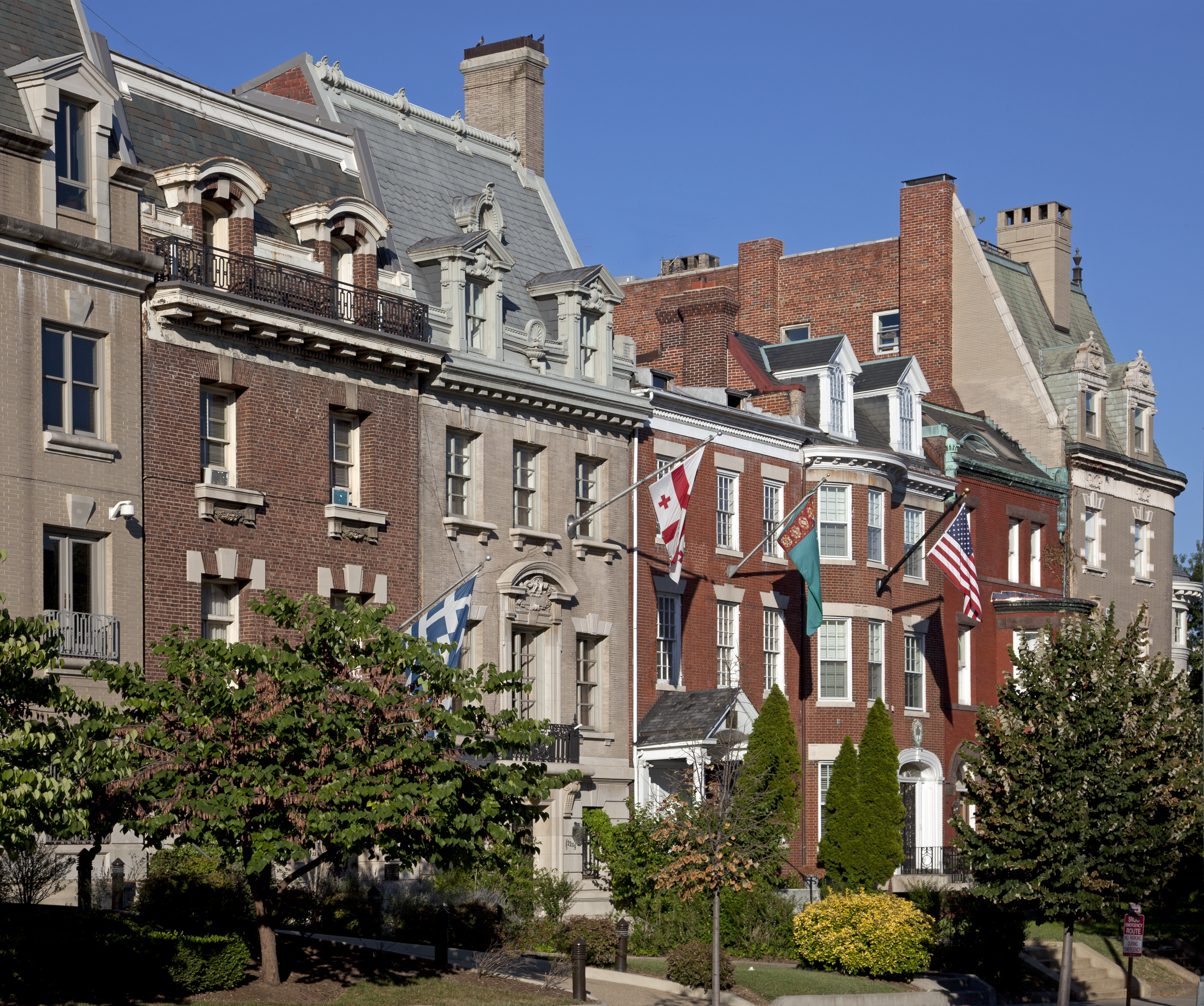
Ornate rowhouses on Embassy Row

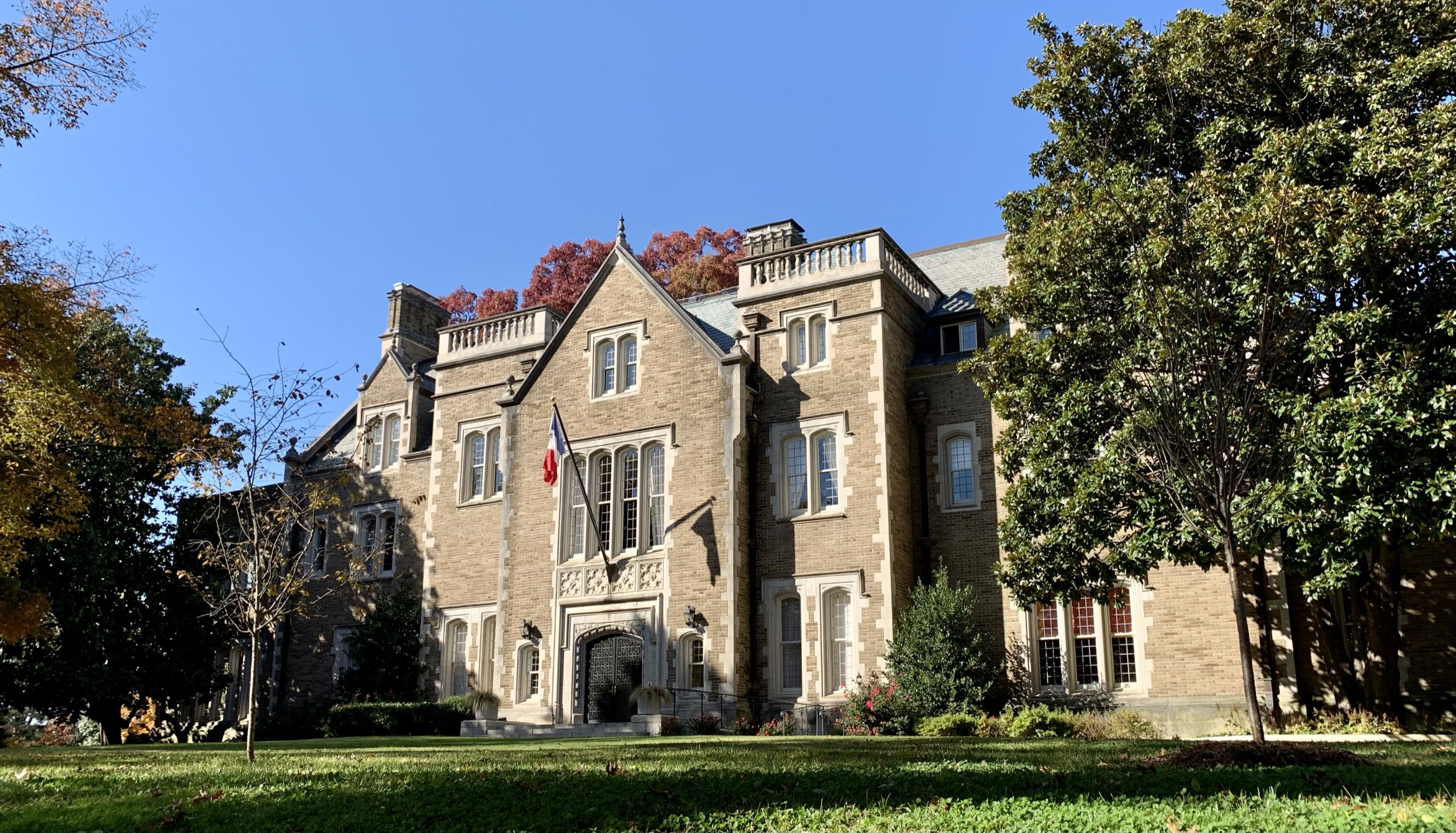
French ambassadorial residence at 2221 Kalorama Road NW

Development in the 1920s grew dramatically, and by 1929, 74.2 percent of the current buildings had been constructed. The neighborhood became known as a place where wealthy people and intellectuals lived. There was minimal growth during the Great Depression, with some of the last houses along Connecticut Avenue being demolished and replaced with additional apartment buildings. The mansions and grand rowhouses along Massachusetts Avenue were sold to foreign governments. Dozens of the houses throughout the neighborhood were converted into embassies or ambassadorial residences, a trend that continued for several decades. There was an influx of temporary residents during World War II, but the neighborhood kept a suburban feel. The city's white flight had little effect on Sheridan-Kalorama. Most residents stayed in the neighborhood and housing prices remained stable.

The construction of diplomatic buildings, along with the conversion of houses into these buildings, continued into the late 20th century. Most neighborhood citizens did not mind the presence of the embassies, but they were wary of how many other diplomatic offices and cultural centers were buying so many properties. Due to pressure from Sheridan-Kalorama residents in the 1980s, the local government set aside 47 acres (19 ha) for embassies to be built in North Cleveland Park. After four years of attempts to have the neighborhood declared a historic landmark, it was listed on the District of Columbia Inventory of Historic Sites (DCIHS) and National Register of Historic Places (NRHP) in 1989. Supporters argued this would help preserve the historic nature of the Sheridan-Kalorama. Even with the landmark designation, by 1993 more than 25 percent of the neighborhood's 686 buildings were owned by foreign nations.

=== 21st century ===
During the early 21st century, there was continued development of some embassy buildings. The former apartment building, St. Alban's, had been purchased by China in the 1970s. It was demolished, except for one historic wall, and replaced with an apartment building for Chinese embassy staff. Sheridan-Kalorama has always been home to wealthy people and prominent officials, including several presidents, with the latest being President Barack Obama, who moved into a large Sheridan-Kalorama house with his family in January 2017. During the first presidency of Donald Trump, his daughter and son-in-law, Ivanka Trump and Jared Kushner, lived in Sheridan-Kalorama. Previous U.S. presidents that lived in Sheridan-Kalorama include William Howard Taft, Woodrow Wilson, Warren G. Harding, Herbert Hoover, and Franklin D. Roosevelt. Another prominent resident is Jeff Bezos who bought adjoining buildings on the 2300 block of S Street. His property, purchased in 2017 for $23 million, is the largest house in Washington, D.C.

== Historic landmarks and embassies ==
=== Historic landmarks ===
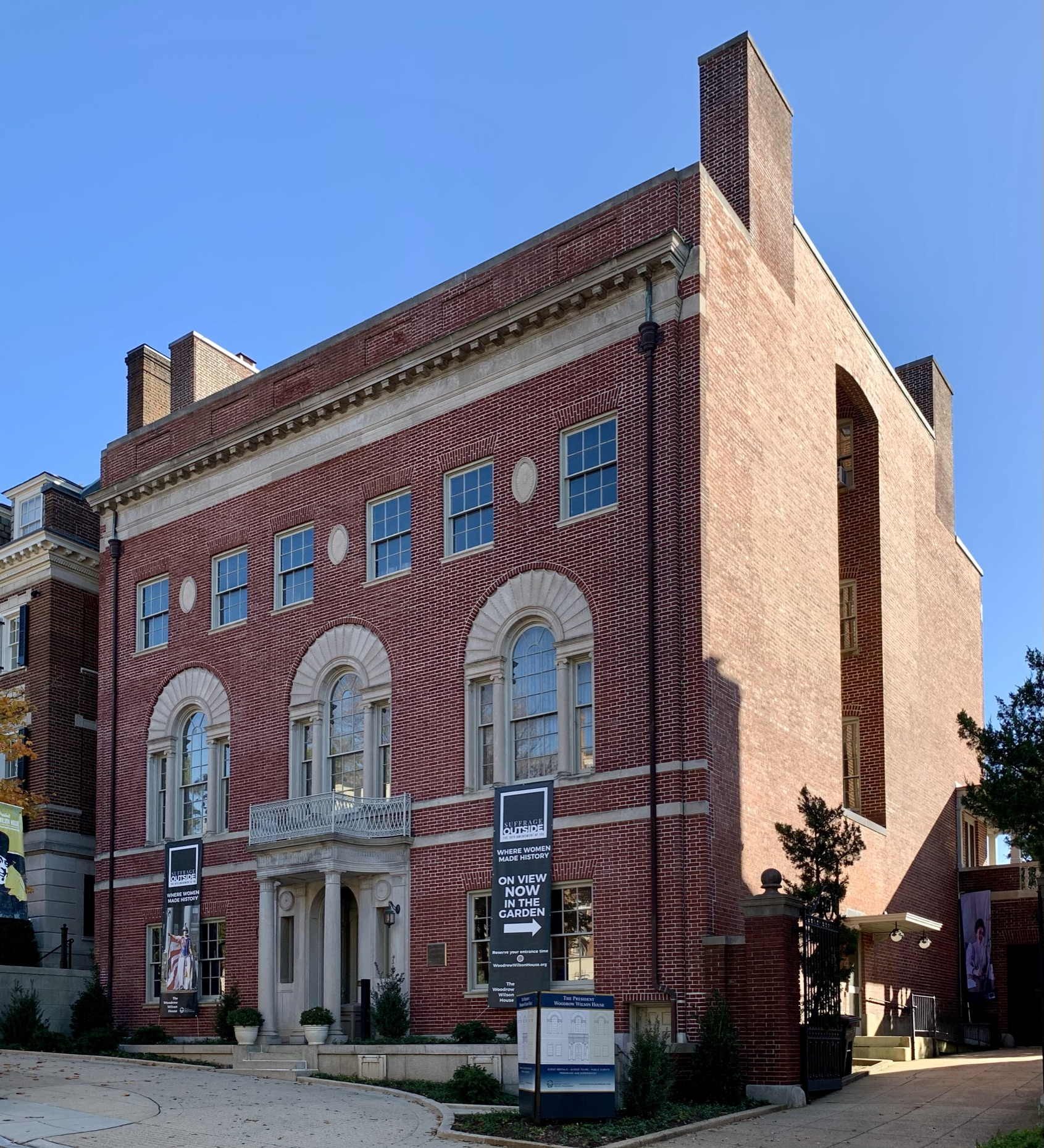
The Woodrow Wilson House is a National Historic Landmark.

Many of the historic landmarks and contributing properties in Sheridan-Kalorama are also included in the Massachusetts Avenue Historic District. In addition to the aforementioned Sheridan-Kalorama Historic District, added to the DCIHS on September 25, 1989, and the NRHP on October 30, 1989, there are numerous historic landmarks throughout the neighborhood. Ones listed on the NRHP and DCIHS include the following: Alice Pike Barney Studio House; the Joseph Beale House; the Codman-Davis House; the Meeting House of the Friends Meeting of Washington; the Anthony Holmead Archeological Site; the Embassy of Japan; The Lindens (disassembled in Massachusetts and reassembled in Sheridan-Kalorama from 1935-1938); the equestrian statue of Philip Sheridan (1 of 18 Civil War Monuments in Washington, D.C. that were collectively listed on the DCIHS and NRHP); and the Tucker House and Myers House (previously home to the Textile Museum). There are 4 National Historic Landmarks in the neighborhood: the Charles Evans Hughes House; the Woodrow Wilson House; the William E. Borah Apartment at the Windsor Lodge; and the Frances Perkins House.

Significant contributing properties in Sheridan-Kalorama include the following: The Army and Navy at 2540 Massachusetts Avenue NW; the Church of the Pilgrims at 2201 P Street NW; The Decatur at 2131 Florida Avenue NW; the Diplomatic Apartments at 2500 Massachusetts Avenue NW; The Dresden at 2126 Connecticut Avenue NW; the Embassy of Thailand's Consular Section at 2300 Kalorama Road; the Edward Hamlin Everett House at 1606 23rd Street NW; the Gibson Fahnestock House at 2311 Massachusetts Avenue NW; The Farnsboro at 2129 Florida Avenue NW; the Emma S. Fitzhuh House at 2253 R Street NW; the Florence Court at 2153/2205 California Street NW; the French ambassadorial residence at 2221 Kalorama Road; the Henrietta M. Halliday House at 2234 Massachusetts Avenue NW;, the Christian Hauge House at 2349 Massachusetts Avenue NW; The Highlands at 1914 Connecticut Avenue NW; The Hightowers at 2000 Connecticut Avenue NW; the Indian Consulate at 2536 Massachusetts Avenue NW; the Islamic Center of Washington at 2551 Massachusetts Avenue NW, the apartment building at 2120 Kalorama Road NW; the Embassy of Malaysia's chancery at 2401 S Street NW; the Miller House at 2201 Massachusetts Avenue NW; the headquarters of the National Society Daughters of the American Colonists at 2205 Massachusetts Avenue; the Mrs. Francis B. Moran House at 2315 Massachusetts Avenue NW; Saint Margaret's Episcopal Church at 1820 Connecticut Avenue NW; The Saint Regis at 2219 California Street NW; the Spanish Steps at 22nd Street and Decatur Place; the Wendell Mansions at 2339 Massachusetts Avenue NW; The Westmoreland at 2122 California Street NW; the Mrs. Sarah S. Wyeth House at 2305 Massachusetts Avenue NW; and the Embassy of Slovenia at 2410 California Street NW.

=== Embassies ===
Diplomatic buildings, including dozens of embassies, in the Sheridan-Kalorama neighborhood include the following: the Embassy of Algeria; the Embassy of Armenia; the Embassy of the Bahamas; the Embassy of Barbados; the Embassy of Belize; the Embassy of Benin; the Embassy of Bulgaria; the Embassy of Burkina Faso; the Embassy of Cameroon; the Embassy of Costa Rica; the Embassy of Cote d'Ivoire; the Embassy of Croatia; the Embassy of Cyprus; the Embassy of the Dominican Republic; the Embassy of Estonia; the Embassy of Greece; the Embassy of Guatemala; the Embassy of Guinea; the Embassy of Guyana; the Embassy of Haiti; the Embassy of Ireland; the Embassy of Japan; the Embassy of Kenya; the Embassy of South Korea; the Embassy of Kyrgyzstan; the Embassy of Laos; the Embassy of Latvia; the Embassy of Lesotho; the Embassy of Luxembourg; the Embassy of Madagascar; the Embassy of Mali; the Embassy of the Marshall Islands; the Embassy of Mauritania; the Embassy of Moldova; the Embassy of Niger; the Embassy of North Macedonia; the Embassy of Paraguay; the Embassy of Romania; the Embassy of Slovenia; the Embassy of Togo; the Embassy of Turkey; the Embassy of Turkmenistan; the Embassy of Yemen; and the Embassy of Zambia. The Embassy of Afghanistan closed in March 2022 and the Embassy of Syria has been suspended since 2014.

== See also ==
- National Register of Historic Places listings in Washington, D.C.
- Neighborhoods in Washington, D.C.
