= Windsor Lodge =

Windsor Lodge may refer to:

- Cumberland Lodge, also known as "Windsor Lodge", country house in Windsor Great Park south of Windsor Castle, England
- William E. Borah Apartment, Windsor Lodge, in Washington, D.C., listed on the National Register of Historic Places, also or perhaps primarily known as "Windsor Lodge"
