= Embassy of the Netherlands, Washington, D.C. =

Embassy of the Kingdom of the Netherlands, Washington, D.C.
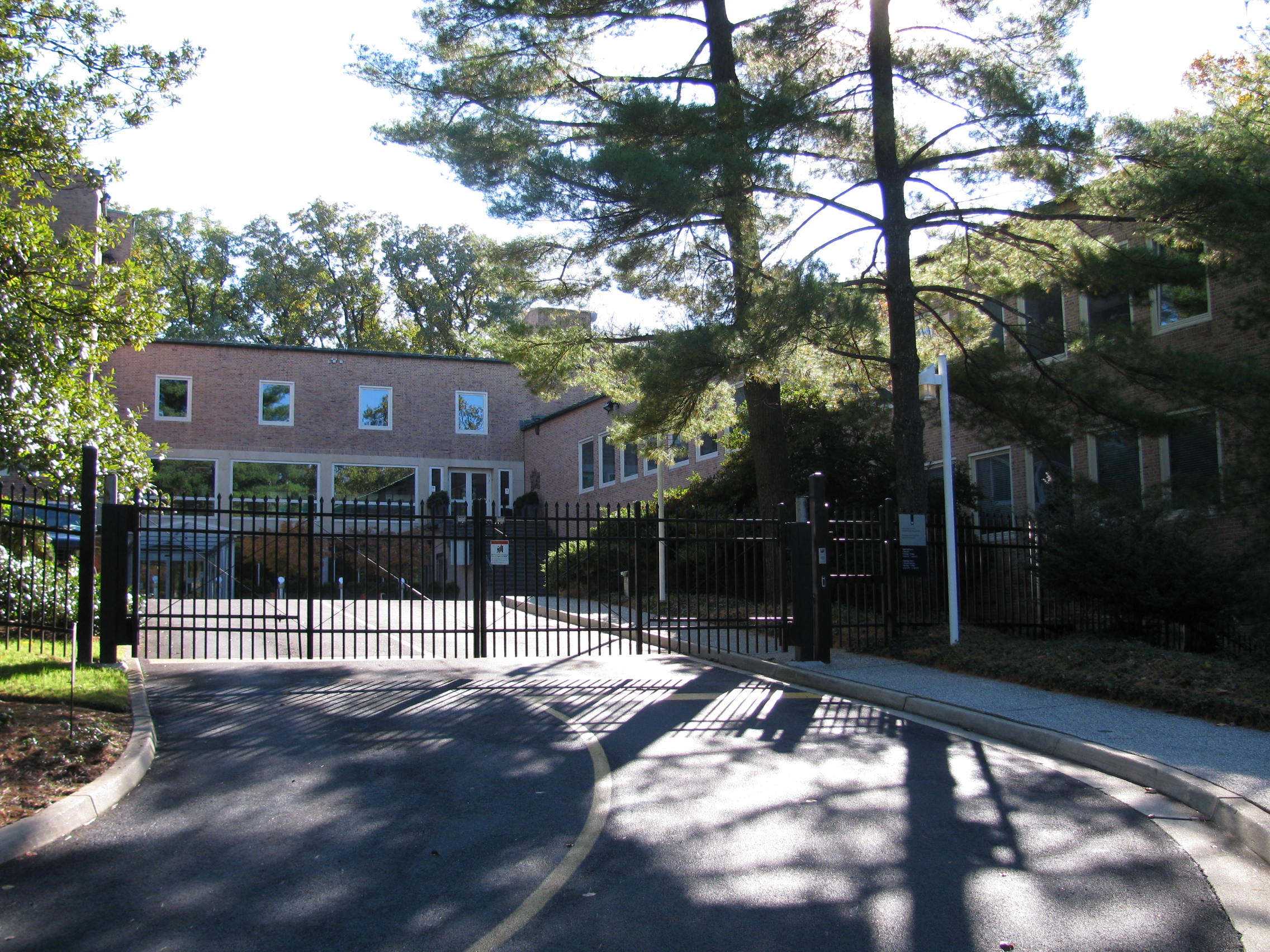
- Location: Washington, D.C.
- Address: 4200 Linnean Avenue, N.W.
- Coordinates: 38°56′40.4516″N 77°3′22.6332″W
- Ambassador: Birgitta Tazelaar

The Embassy of the Netherlands in Washington, D.C., is the Kingdom of the Netherlands' diplomatic mission to the United States, located at 4200 Linnean Avenue, N.W., Washington, D.C.

The Netherlands operates Consulates-General in Atlanta, Chicago, Miami, New York and San Francisco.

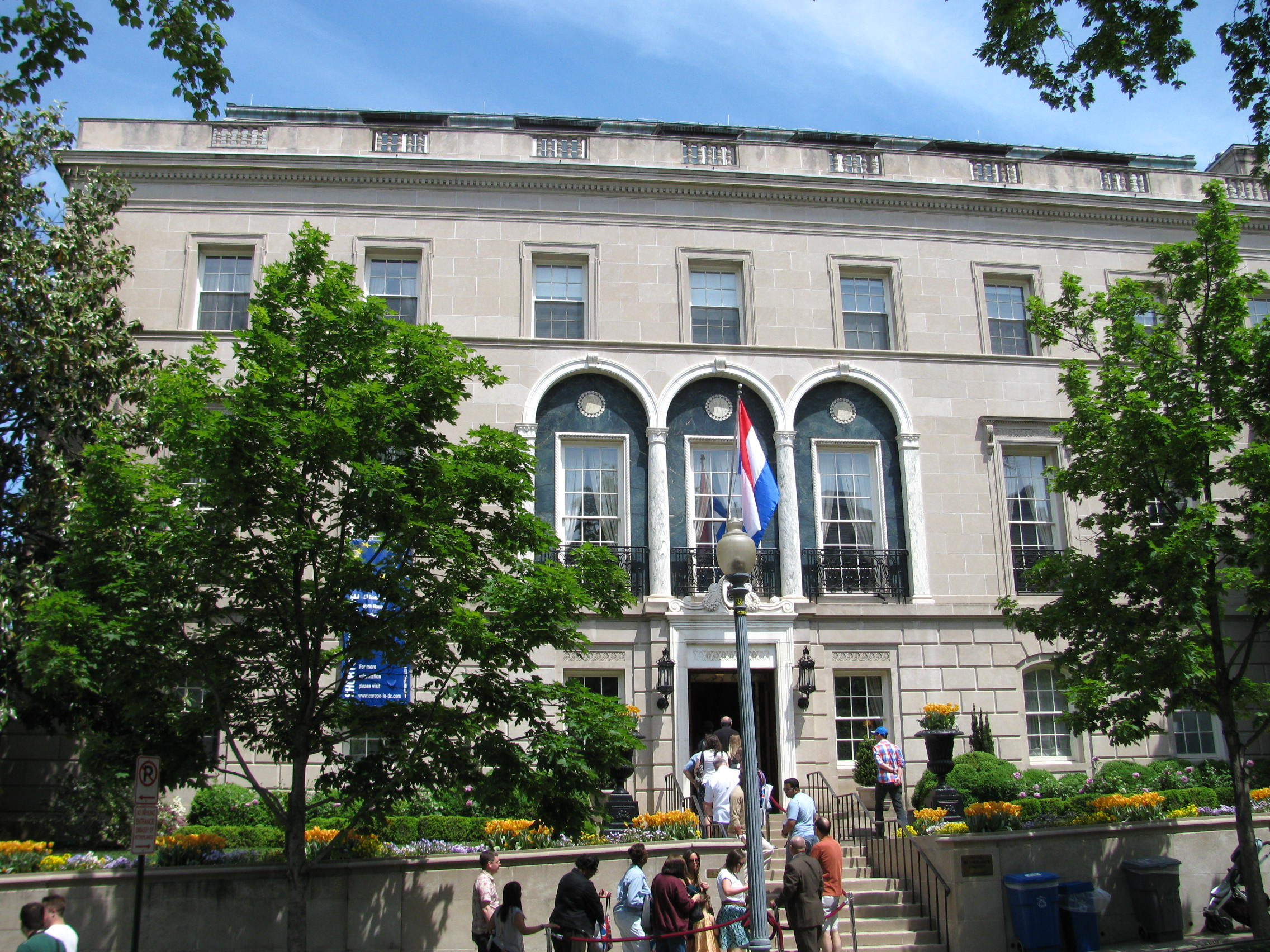
Residence of the Ambassador of the Netherlands

The Dutch Ambassador to the United States is Birgitta Tazelaar. The Ambassador's residence is located at 2347 S Street, N.W. Washington, D.C.
