= Spanish Steps (disambiguation) =

Spanish Steps most commonly refers to:

- Spanish Steps, in Rome.

Spanish Steps may also refer to:

- Spanish Steps (Washington, D.C.)
- Spanish Steps (Tacoma, Washington)
- Spanish Steps (book)
- Spanish Steps (song)
