= List of National Historic Landmarks in Washington, D.C. =

The District of Columbia, capital of the United States, is home to 78 National Historic Landmarks. The National Historic Landmark program is operated under the auspices of the National Park Service, and recognizes structures, districts, objects, and similar resources according to a list of criteria of national significance. The city's landmarks reflect its status as the national capital, including grand government buildings, homes of politicians, military facilities, and museums. The list also includes sites relating to support for the disabled, the Civil Rights Movement, pioneering urban infrastructure, and other historic themes.

National Historic Landmarks are normally listed on the National Register of Historic Places. Section 107 of the National Historic Preservation Act of 1966 exempts three Washington, D.C., National Historic Landmarks from this rule: the White House, the United States Capitol, and the United States Supreme Court Building. All are designated landmarks, but are not on the National Register.

== Key ==
	National Historic Landmark
^{†}	National Historic Landmark District
^{#}	National Historic Site, National Historical Park, National Memorial, or National Monument
^{*}	Delisted Landmark

== Current NHLs ==
	Landmark name	Image	Date designated	Location	Description
1	Cleveland Abbe House	Cleveland Abbe House	May 15, 1975 (#69000289)	NW; 38°54′05″N 77°02′46″W	Cleveland Abbe, a prominent meteorologist who became known as the father of the National Weather Service, lived in this house from 1877 to 1909. Previous occupants in the early decades of the 19th century included James Monroe and the British legation. Built ca. 1802 to 1805, this is a fine example of the Federal style of residential architecture.
2	Administration Building, Carnegie Institution of Washington	Administration Building, Carnegie Institution of Washington	June 23, 1965 (#66000959)	NW; 38°54′39″N 77°02′07″W	
3	American Federation of Labor Building	American Federation of Labor Building	May 30, 1974 (#74002154)	NW; 38°54′12″N 77°01′28″W	
4	American Peace Society	American Peace Society	May 30, 1974 (#74002155)	NW; 38°53′58″N 77°02′19″W	Headquarters of the American Peace Society from 1911 to 1948, in LaFayette Square Historic District.
5	Anderson House	Anderson House	June 19, 1996 (#71000993)	NW; 38°54′39″N 77°02′53″W	
6^{†}	Andrew Rankin Memorial Chapel, Frederick Douglass Memorial Hall, Founders Library, Howard University	Andrew Rankin Memorial Chapel, Frederick Douglass Memorial Hall, Founders Library, Howard University	January 3, 2001 (#01000070)	NW; 38°55′23″N 77°01′15″W	Three Howard University buildings: Andrew Rankin Memorial Chapel, Frederick Douglass Memorial Hall, and Founders Library.
7	Arts and Industries Building, Smithsonian Institution	Arts and Industries Building, Smithsonian Institution	November 11, 1971 (#71000994)	SW; 38°53′13″N 77°01′29″W	
8	Ashburton House	Ashburton House	November 7, 1973 (#73002071)	NW; 38°54′01″N 77°02′09″W	House on Lafayette Square that was site of 10 months of U.S.-British negotiations leading to the Webster-Ashburton Treaty of 1842. This settled U.S.-Canada border disputes and ended the Aroostook War.
9	Newton D. Baker House	Newton D. Baker House	December 8, 1976 (#76002126)	NW; 38°54′25″N 77°03′37″W	
10	Blair House	Blair House	October 26, 1973 (#66000963)	NW; 38°53′56″N 77°02′19″W	Former home of the Blair family, which now serves as a home for guests of the President.
11	William E. Borah Apartment, Windsor Lodge	William E. Borah Apartment, Windsor Lodge	December 8, 1976 (#76002134)	NW; 38°55′03″N 77°02′57″W	The home of William E. Borah, a United States Senator from Idaho and a noted isolationist.
12	Blanche K. Bruce House	Blanche K. Bruce House	May 15, 1975 (#75002046)	NW; 38°54′21″N 77°01′29″W	A home of Blanche K. Bruce, who was an African American Senator from Mississippi.
13	Carnegie Endowment for International Peace	Carnegie Endowment for International Peace	May 30, 1974 (#74002156)	NW; 38°53′56″N 77°02′19″W	
14	Mary Ann Shadd Cary House	Mary Ann Shadd Cary House	December 8, 1976 (#76002128)	NW; 38°55′09″N 77°01′58″W	A home of writer and abolitionist Mary Ann Shadd Cary.
15	City Hall / D.C. Courthouse	City Hall / D.C. Courthouse	December 19, 1960 (#66000857)	NW; 38°53′43″N 77°01′04″W	Also known as the Old Courthouse, it was renovated and rededicated on June 17, 2009 as the District of Columbia Court of Appeals.
16	Congressional Cemetery	Congressional Cemetery	June 14, 2011 (#69000292)	SE; 38°52′52″N 76°58′38″W	Burial place of early city residents and many members of Congress who died in office.
17	Constitution Hall	Constitution Hall	September 16, 1985 (#85002724)	NW; 38°53′38″N 77°02′24″W	A concert hall that houses Washington D.C.'s largest auditorium
18	Corcoran Gallery and Corcoran School Of Art	Corcoran Gallery and Corcoran School Of Art	April 27, 1992 (#71000997)	NW; 38°53′45″N 77°02′24″W	
19	Elliott Coues House	Elliott Coues House	May 15, 1975 (#75002049)	NW; 38°54′25″N 77°02′24″W	Elliott Coues, a leading 19th century ornithologist, led great expansions of the knowledge of North American bird life, helped found the American Ornithologists' Union in 1883, edited approximately 15 volumes of journals, memoirs, and diaries by famous Western explorers and fur traders. He lived in this house from 1887 until his death in 1899.
20	Decatur House	Decatur House	December 19, 1960 (#66000858)	NW; 38°53′59″N 77°02′20″W	Federal Style house designed by Benjamin Henry Latrobe for naval hero Stephen Decatur across Lafayette Square from the White House. During 1827-1833 was home to successive Secretaries of State Henry Clay, Martin Van Buren, and Judah P. Benjamin.
21	Franklin School	Franklin School	June 19, 1996 (#73002085)	NW; 38°54′08″N 77°01′47″W	A nineteenth-century school, site of Alexander Graham Bell's experiments with the photophone.
22	The Furies Collective	The Furies Collective	December 13, 2024 (#100011366)	219 11th St., SE; 38°53′13″N 76°59′29″W	
23^{†}	Gallaudet College Historic District	Gallaudet College Historic District	December 21, 1965 (#66000856)	NE; 38°54′26″N 76°59′35″W	The world's first college for the education of the deaf and hard of hearing.
24	General Federation of Women's Clubs Headquarters	General Federation of Women's Clubs Headquarters	December 4, 1991 (#91002057)	NW; 38°54′25″N 77°02′25″W	
25	General Post Office	General Post Office	November 11, 1971 (#69000311)	NW; 38°53′48″N 77°01′22″W	This post office is a fine example of restrained Neoclassical design. Built in phases between 1839 and 1866, the building features beautiful scaling and fine details.
26^{†}	Georgetown Historic District	Georgetown Historic District	May 28, 1967 (#67000025)	NW; 38°54′34″N 77°03′54″W	Historic site and neighborhoods on the Potomac River that once served as the nation's capital and as its own standalone municipality.
27	Samuel Gompers House	Samuel Gompers House	May 30, 1974 (#74002161)	NW; 38°55′08″N 77°00′44″W	Samuel Gompers was president of the American Federation of Labor from 1886 until his death in 1924. Gompers helped found the AFL, and vigorously pursued its three goals of higher wages, shorter hours, and better working conditions for American workers. He lived in this three-story brick rowhouse from 1902 to 1917.
28	Charlotte Forten Grimke House	Charlotte Forten Grimke House	May 11, 1976 (#76002129)	NW; 38°54′45″N 77°02′13″W	A home of Charlotte Forten Grimke, a prominent abolitionist and educator.
29	Healy Hall, Georgetown University	Healy Hall, Georgetown University	December 23, 1987 (#71001003)	NW; 38°54′26″N 77°04′23″W	This large-scale High Victorian Gothic structure is the most prominent building on the Georgetown University campus and a picturesque landmark for all Georgetown. Built from 1877 through 1879, its construction marked the evolution of the school toward true university status.
30	General Oliver Otis Howard House	General Oliver Otis Howard House	May 30, 1974 (#74002163)	NW; 38°55′23″N 77°01′20″W	Located on Howard University campus, a home of Union general and Howard founder Oliver O. Howard.
31	Charles Evans Hughes House	Charles Evans Hughes House	November 28, 1972 (#72001424)	NW; 38°54′45″N 77°02′58″W	Charles Evans Hughes was a leader in the progressive movement, and 1916 presidential candidate. He held office as Associate Justice and Chief Justice of the United States, as well as multiple executive positions under several Presidents. He lived in this house from 1930 until his death in 1948.
32	Hiram W. Johnson House	Hiram W. Johnson House	December 8, 1976 (#73002072)	NE; 38°53′29″N 77°00′18″W	
33	Lafayette Building	Lafayette Building	September 1, 2005 (#05001205)	NW; 38°54′03″N 77°02′04″W	Home of Reconstruction Finance Corporation which helped finance the buildup for World War II.
34^{†}	Lafayette Square Historic District	Lafayette Square Historic District	August 29, 1970 (#70000833)	NW; 38°53′59″N 77°02′12″W	District including LaFayette Square Park, surrounding but excluding the White House.
35	Library of Congress	Library of Congress	December 21, 1965 (#66000000)	SE; 38°53′20″N 77°00′16″W	The Thomas Jefferson Building of the Library of Congress
36	Andrew Mellon Building	Andrew Mellon Building	May 11, 1976 (#73002100)	NW; 38°54′33″N 77°02′30″W	A residence of Andrew W. Mellon, an American banker and philanthropist.
37	Memorial Continental Hall	Memorial Continental Hall	November 28, 1972 (#72001427)	NW; 38°53′37″N 77°02′25″W	
38	Meridian Hill Park	Meridian Hill Park	April 19, 1994 (#74000273)	NW; 38°55′16″N 77°02′08″W	
39	National Archives	National Archives	December 11, 2023 (#100009816)	Constitution Ave. between 7th and 9th Sts., NW. 38°53′33″N 77°01′24″W	A building of records where several key U.S. documents including The United States Bill of Rights, The United States Declaration of Independence, and The Constitution of the United States.
40	National Training School For Women And Girls	National Training School For Women And Girls	July 17, 1991 (#91002049)	NE; 38°53′46″N 76°55′48″W	
41	National War College	National War College	November 28, 1972 (#72001535)	SW; 38°51′48″N 77°01′01″W	Listing is for Roosevelt Hall, which houses the National War College.
42	Octagon House	Octagon House	December 19, 1960 (#66000863)	NW; 38°53′46″N 77°02′30″W	Plantation owner's home lent to President Madison after the Burning of Washington in 1814.
43	Old Naval Observatory	Old Naval Observatory	January 12, 1965 (#66000864)	NW; 38°53′42″N 77°03′07″W	The original US Naval Observatory, current home of the Navy Bureau of Medicine and Surgery; closed to the public.
44	Old Patent Office	Old Patent Office	January 12, 1965 (#66000902)	NW; 38°53′52″N 77°01′23″W	Current home of the National Portrait Gallery and the Smithsonian American Art Museum.
45	Pan American Union Headquarters	Pan American Union Headquarters	January 13, 2021 (#10000625)	17th St. between C St. and Constitution Ave., NW. 38°53′34″N 77°02′27″W	
46	Pension Building	Pension Building	February 4, 1985 (#69000312)	NW; 38°53′51″N 77°01′05″W	Historical museum of building architecture, design, and Urban planning. Once was the home of The Bureau of Pensions.
47	Frances Perkins House	Frances Perkins House	July 17, 1992 (#91002048)	NW; 38°54′55″N 77°03′07″W	A home of Frances Perkins, Secretary of Labor and the first woman to serve in the United States Cabinet.
48	PHILADELPHIA (Gundelo)	PHILADELPHIA (Gundelo)	January 20, 1961 (#66000852)	NW; 38°53′28″N 77°01′46″W	Philadelphia, the only remaining American gunboat from the Revolutionary War, sank in a battle on Lake Champlain in 1776. It was salvaged in remarkably good condition in 1935 and now resides at the National Museum of American History.
49	Red Cross (American National) Headquarters	Red Cross (American National) Headquarters	June 23, 1965 (#66000853)	NW; 38°53′41″N 77°02′26″W	The national headquarters of humanitarian organization American Red Cross.
50	Renwick Gallery	Renwick Gallery	November 11, 1971 (#69000300)	NW; 38°53′56″N 77°02′22″W	A museum of art and graphics. The museum is a part of the expansive Smithsonian Institution.
51	Zalmon Richards House	Zalmon Richards House	December 21, 1965 (#66000866)	NW; 38°54′42″N 77°01′49″W	A home of National Education Association founder Zalmon Richards.
52^{†}	St. Elizabeth's Hospital	St. Elizabeth's Hospital	December 14, 1990 (#79003101)	SE; 38°50′57″N 76°59′23″W	
53	St. John's Church	St. John's Church	December 19, 1960 (#66000868)	NW; 38°54′01″N 77°02′07″W	Popularly nicknamed the "Church of the Presidents".
54	St. Luke's Episcopal Church	St. Luke's Episcopal Church	May 11, 1976 (#76002131)	NW; 38°54′37″N 77°02′05″W	The first African-American Episcopal church in Washington, DC.
55	SEQUOIA (Yacht)	SEQUOIA (Yacht)	December 23, 1987 (#87002594)	SE; 38°52′32″N 77°01′20″W	The former Presidential yacht from Herbert Hoover to Jimmy Carter, moored at the Washington Marina.
56	Sewall–Belmont House	Sewall–Belmont House	May 30, 1974 (#72001432)	NE; 38°53′31″N 77°00′13″W	Headquarters of the National Women's Party and home to a museum of the Suffrage movement.
57	Lucy Diggs Slowe and Mary Burrill House	Lucy Diggs Slowe and Mary Burrill House	December 13, 2024 (#100011383)	1256 Kearny St. NE. 38°55′51″N 76°59′20″W	
58	Smithsonian Institution Building	Smithsonian Institution Building	January 12, 1965 (#66000867)	SW; 38°53′19″N 77°01′35″W	Informally known as The Castle, this building serves as the headquarters for The Smithsonian Institution.
59	John Philip Sousa Junior High School	John Philip Sousa Junior High School	August 7, 2001 (#01001045)	SE; 38°53′01″N 76°57′09″W	In 1950, eleven black students were denied admission to the newly constructed all-white Sousa school. This action was eventually overturned in the landmark 1954 Supreme Court decision in Bolling v. Sharpe, which made segregated public schools illegal in the District of Columbia. This defeat of the principle of "separate but equal" was a significant landmark in the modern Civil Rights Movement.
60	State, War, And Navy Building	State, War, And Navy Building	November 11, 1971 (#69000293)	NW; 38°53′51″N 77°02′21″W	
61	Supreme Court Building	Supreme Court Building	May 4, 1987 (#87001294)	NE; 38°53′27″N 77°00′16″W	Federal court building that houses the Supreme Court of the United States, the highest judiciary branch in the United States.
62	Mary Church Terrell House	Mary Church Terrell House	May 15, 1975 (#75002055)	NW; 38°54′56″N 77°01′00″W	A home of Mary Church Terrell, abolitionist and first African-American woman to serve on a school board.
63	Tudor Place	Tudor Place	December 19, 1960 (#66000871)	NW; 38°54′39″N 77°03′48″W	A home, designed by Capitol designer Dr. William Thornton, and containing a collection of artifacts of George Washington and Martha Washington.
64	Twelfth Street YMCA Building	Twelfth Street YMCA Building	October 12, 1994 (#83003523)	NW; 38°54′54″N 77°01′42″W	NRHP 83003523. The earliest "Y" built by and expressly for African Americans.
65	Oscar W. Underwood House	Oscar W. Underwood House	December 8, 1976 (#76002132)	NW; 38°53′53″N 77°02′43″W	A home of Oscar W. Underwood, United States Senator from Alabama.
66	United Mine Workers of America Building	United Mine Workers of America Building	April 5, 2005 (#00001032)	NW; 38°54′06″N 77°02′05″W	
67	United States Capitol	United States Capitol	December 19, 1960 (#19600002)	NW, NE, SE, SW; 38°53′23″N 77°00′32″W	Iconic home of the United States Congress.
68	United States Department of the Treasury	United States Department of the Treasury	November 11, 1971 (#71001007)	NW; 38°53′51″N 77°02′03″W	Home of the United States Department of the Treasury. Executes currency circulation within the fiscal system of the United States.
69^{†}	United States Marine Corps Barrack and Commandant's House	United States Marine Corps Barrack and Commandant's House	May 11, 1976 (#72001435)	SE; 38°52′49″N 76°59′38″W	
70^{†}	United States Soldier's Home	United States Soldier's Home	November 7, 1973 (#74002176)	NW; 38°56′30″N 77°00′42″W	
71	Volta Bureau	Volta Bureau	November 28, 1972 (#72001436)	NW; 38°54′34″N 77°04′09″W	Founded in 1887 by Alexander Graham Bell "for the increase and diffusion of knowledge relating to the Deaf"; merged with the American Association for the Promotion and Teaching of Speech to the Deaf in 1908, and operates today as the Alexander Graham Bell Association for the Deaf and Hard of Hearing.
72	Washington Aqueduct	Washington Aqueduct	November 7, 1973 (#73002123)	NW; 38°56′15″N 77°06′51″W	Extends into Montgomery County, Maryland.
73^{†}	Washington Navy Yard	Washington Navy Yard	May 11, 1976 (#73002124)	SE; 38°52′24″N 76°59′49″W	
74	White House	White House	December 19, 1960 (#19600001)	NW; 38°53′52″N 77°02′12″W	Residence of the president of the United States.
75	David White House	David White House	January 7, 1976 (#76002133)	NW; 38°55′32″N 77°02′04″W	Geologist David White of the United States Geological Survey lived in this house from 1910 to 1925. His researches into the distribution of petroleum resources became essential to the oil industry.
76	Woodrow Wilson House	Woodrow Wilson House	July 19, 1964 (#66000873)	NW; 38°54′51″N 77°03′05″W	A home of Woodrow Wilson, 28th President of the United States.
77^{#}	Carter G. Woodson House	Carter G. Woodson House	May 11, 1976 (#76002135)	NW; 38°54′36″N 77°01′27″W	A home of Carter G. Woodson, the "Father of Black History".
78	Robert Simpson Woodward House	Robert Simpson Woodward House	January 7, 1976 (#76002136)	NW; 38°54′32″N 77°02′11″W	From 1904 to 1914, this was the home of Robert Simpson Woodward, the first President of the Carnegie Institution during the same period. Woodward had made his name as a leading geologist and mathematician.

== Moved NHLs ==
There are no delisted NHLs in Washington, D.C. Ships that are designated NHLs have previously been located in Washington, but have been moved elsewhere, and the Army Medical Museum and Library collection has been relocated to Maryland.

	Landmark name	Image	Date designated	Date moved	Quadrant	Description
1	Army Medical Museum and Library		January 12, 1965	1988	NW 38°58′37″N 77°01′57″W	The listed building was demolished in 1969; the museum collection and library are now part of the National Museum of Health and Medicine, and are based in Silver Spring, Maryland. The landmark designation is under evaluation.

== See also ==
- National Register of Historic Places listings in Washington, D.C.
- List of U.S. National Historic Landmarks by state
- District of Columbia Inventory of Historic Sites
- Historic preservation
- National Register of Historic Places
- History of Washington, D.C.
- Timeline of Washington, D.C.
