= Charles Evans Hughes House =

Historic house in Washington, D.C., United States

- U.S. National Register of Historic Places
- U.S. National Historic Landmark
- U.S. Historic district – Contributing property
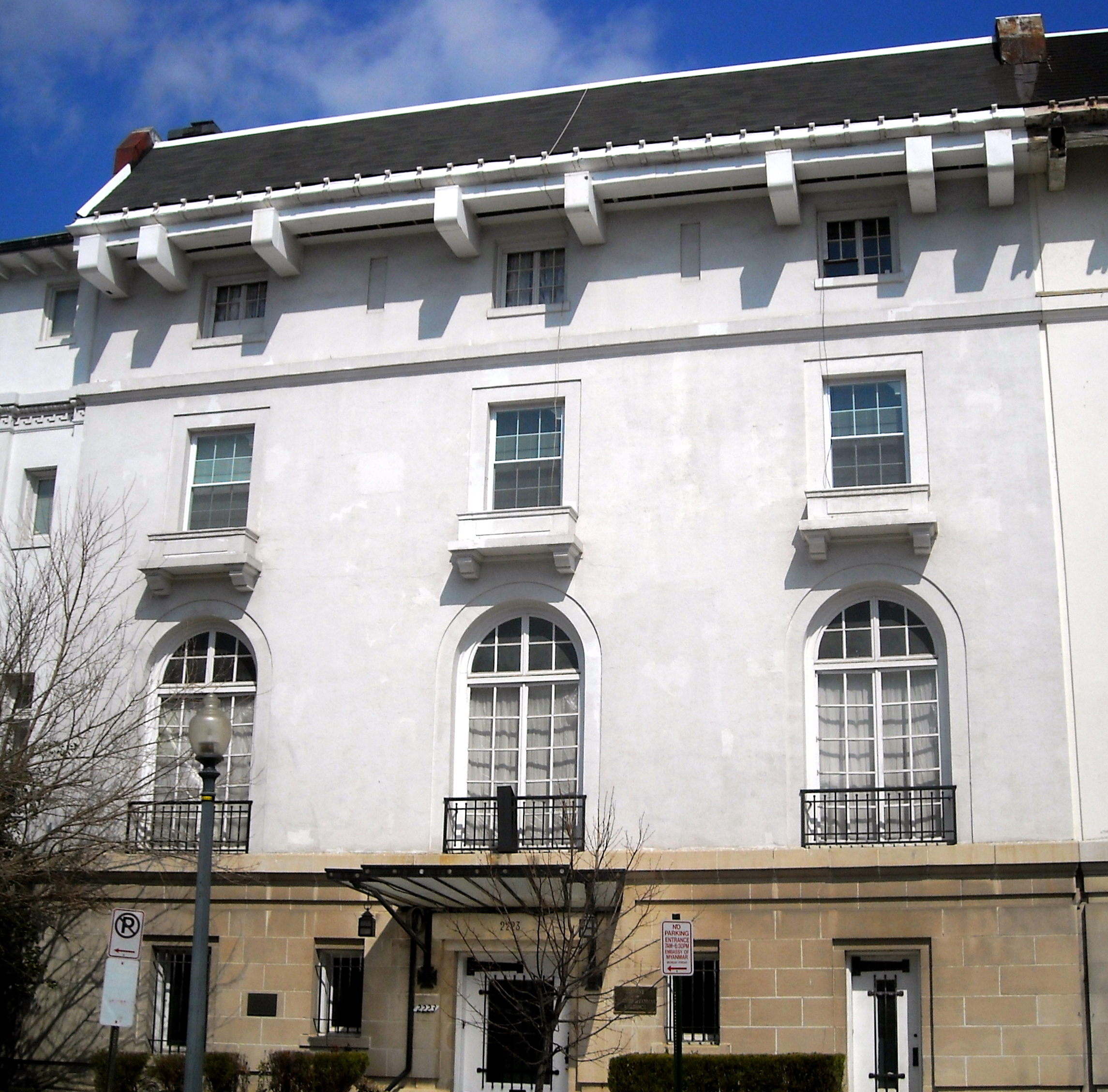

- Location within Washington, D.C. Location within the United States
- Location: 2223 R Street, NW; Washington, D.C.
- Coordinates: 38°54′46″N 77°2′59″W
- Built: 1907
- Architect: George Oakley Totten Jr.
- Architectural style: Mediterranean Revival Style
- Part of: Sheridan-Kalorama Historic District (ID89001743)
- NRHP reference No.: 72001424

Significant dates
- Added to NRHP: November 28, 1972
- Designated NHL: November 28, 1972
- Designated CP: October 30, 1989

The Charles Evans Hughes House is a historic house at 2223 R Street, NW in the Sheridan-Kalorama neighborhood of Washington, D.C. Built in 1907, it was from 1930 to 1948 the home of Charles Evans Hughes (1862–1948), a prominent Republican politician and from 1930 to 1941 the Chief Justice of the United States. It was declared a National Historic Landmark in 1972 and is a contributing property to the Sheridan-Kalorama Historic District. It presently serves as the official residence of the Ambassador of Myanmar to the United States.

== Description and history ==
The Charles Evans Hughes House is located in Washington's Embassy Row area. It is on the north side of R Street, between Sheridan Circle and 22nd Street. It is one of two stone row houses that are 3 1/2 stories in height, and modeled on an Italian palazzo. The ground floor is unpainted, with a flared glass-and-iron hood sheltering the central main entrance. A secondary entrance is in the rightmost bay. Second-floor windows are tall, and set in rounded arch openings, with shallow iron balconies. The third floor windows are rectangular, with bracketed stone window boxes.

The house was built in 1907 to a design by George Oakley Totten Jr. Its early uses were as either a diplomatic residence or embassy, including by the missions of Peru and Chile. In 1930 it was purchased by Charles Evans Hughes, recently appointed as Chief Justice of the United States. Hughes was a leader in the Progressive Era of the early 20th century and 1916 presidential candidate. He held office as Associate Justice from 1910 to 1916, during which period he was a prominent dissenting voice on a conservative court. He held multiple executive positions under several Presidents before being appointed Chief Justice in 1930 by President Herbert Hoover. He lived in this house from 1930 until his death in 1948.

In 1972, the building was purchased by the Union of Burma, now Myanmar. It currently serves as the residence of the Burmese ambassador.

== See also ==
- List of National Historic Landmarks in Washington, D.C.
- National Register of Historic Places listings in the upper NW Quadrant of Washington, D.C.
