= The Lindens (Washington, D.C.) =

Historic house in Washington, D.C., United States

- U.S. National Register of Historic Places
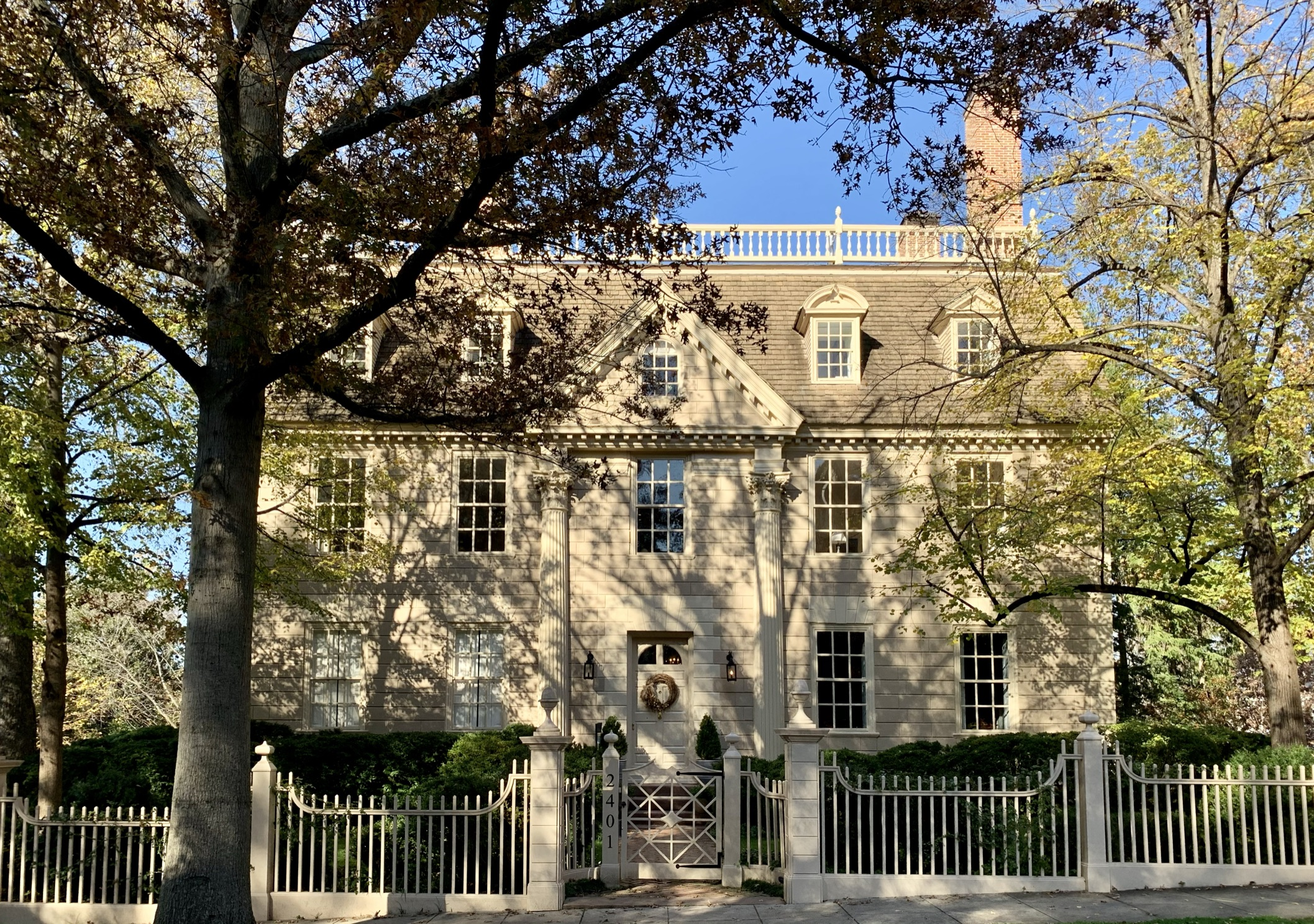

- Location within Washington, D.C.
- Location: 2401 Kalorama Rd. NW; Washington, D.C.
- Coordinates: 38°55′6″N 77°3′13″W
- Built: 1754
- Architectural style: Colonial
- NRHP reference No.: 69000297
- Added to NRHP: June 4, 1969

The Lindens, also known as the King Hooper House, is an historic three-story house located in the Sheridan-Kalorama neighborhood of Washington, D.C. It is the oldest house in Washington (although it was not originally built there) and has been listed on the National Register of Historic Places since 1969.

The house was built in Danvers, Massachusetts, in 1754 as a grand summer home for Robert "King" Hooper, a leading shipowner and merchant in Marblehead, Massachusetts, who sided with the Tories before the Revolutionary War and lent the house for four months to Thomas Gage, the reviled British governor. Hooper lost the house to creditors. After passing through several other owners, including one who used it as a boardinghouse, the house was purchased in 1860 by Francis Peabody Jr., who restored and added to it.

It was again sold in 1933 to antiques dealers Israel Sack and Leon David, who sold the paneled drawing room to a Kansas City museum. The remainder of the house was sold the next year for about US$13,000 (equivalent to $312,873 in 2025) to George and Miriam Morris, who were seeking a period house to showcase their collection of early American furniture.

The Morrises had the house dismantled and shipped to Washington, with the pieces numbered, in six railroad boxcars. Under the direction of the key architect at Colonial Williamsburg, it was slowly reassembled from 1935 to 1938 on a concrete foundation, supported by steel beams. Over the next 45 years, some 50,000 visitors passed through the house, greeted by the owners in period costume. In 1983 it was sold to Norman and Diane Bernstein, who modernized and updated the kitchen and plumbing. At that time, some of the furnishings were auctioned for $2.3 million at Christie's. In 2007 it was resold for $7.2 million, and in 2016 the house was listed for sale again.

The house measures 8,250 square feet (766 m^{2}), with 11 fireplaces, and has nearly 12-foot (3.7 m) ceilings, interior columns, stenciled floors, and wallpaper designed in Paris in the early 1800s.

== See also ==
Robert "King" Hooper Mansion (Marblehead, Massachusetts)
