= Robert "King" Hooper Mansion =

Historic house in Massachusetts, United States

- Robert King Hooper Mansion
- U.S. National Register of Historic Places
- U.S. Historic district – Contributing property
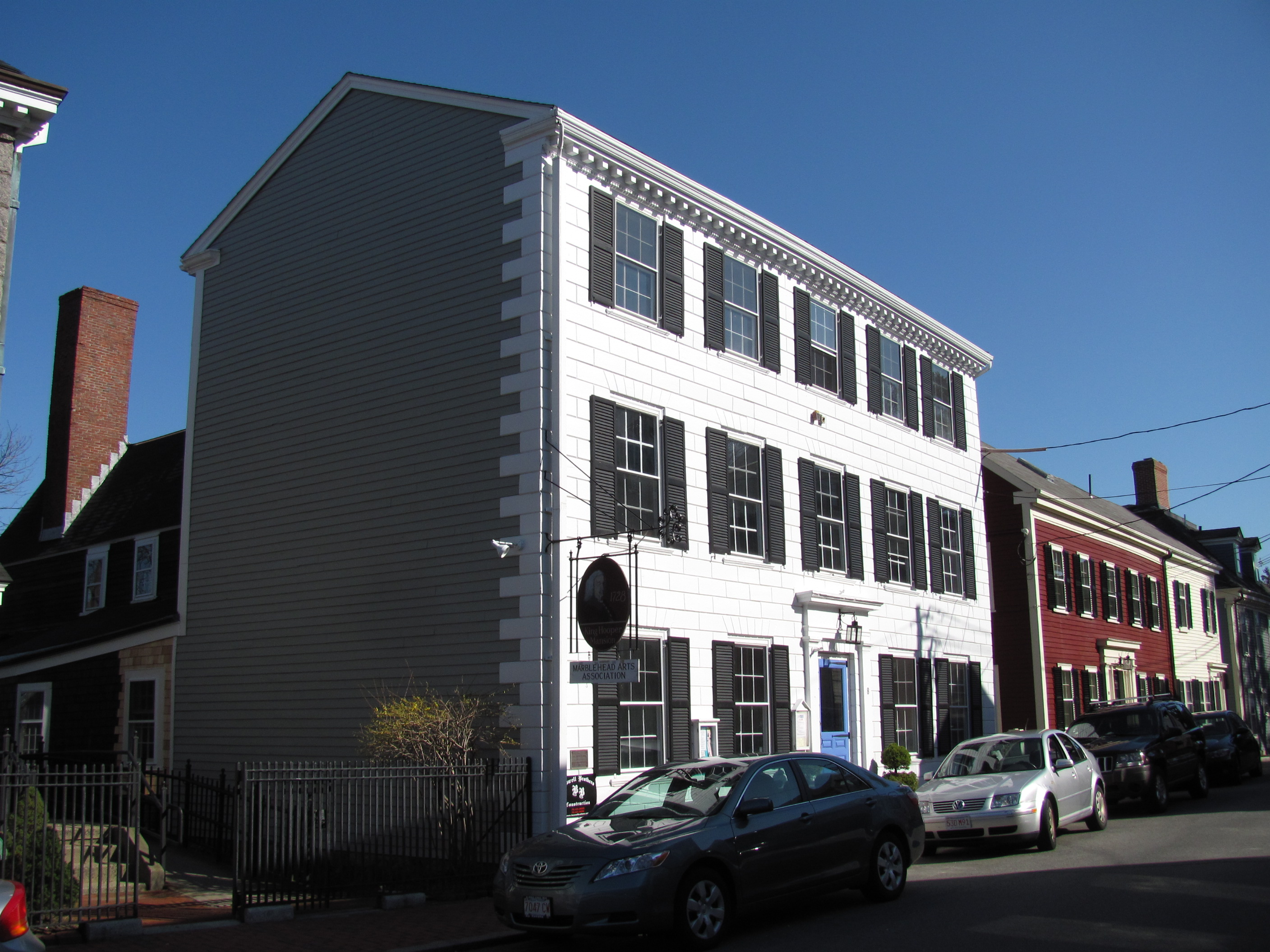
- Robert Hooper Mansion

- Location within Massachusetts Location within the United States
- Location: 8 Hooper Street, Marblehead, Massachusetts
- Coordinates: 42°30′12″N 70°51′02″W
- Built: 1728
- Architectural style: Colonial, Georgian
- NRHP reference No.: 76000264
- Added to NRHP: May 12, 1976

The Robert King Hooper Mansion, built in 1728, is a historic house in Marblehead, Massachusetts. The oldest section of the mansion was built by candlemaker Greenfield Hooper, and his son, Robert "King" Hooper, expanded the house, adding its three-story Georgian façade c. 1745. Hooper made his fortune through the transatlantic fishing business.

It was added to the National Register of Historic Places in 1976, and included in the Marblehead Historic District in 1984.

== Marblehead Arts Association ==
The mansion is currently used by the Marblehead Arts Association as its headquarters. The Association hosts changing exhibits of art and photography for individuals and groups every six weeks in its seven galleries, as well as art classes and community events. The Hooper Mansion also has an Artisan Shop featuring affordable art and gifts.

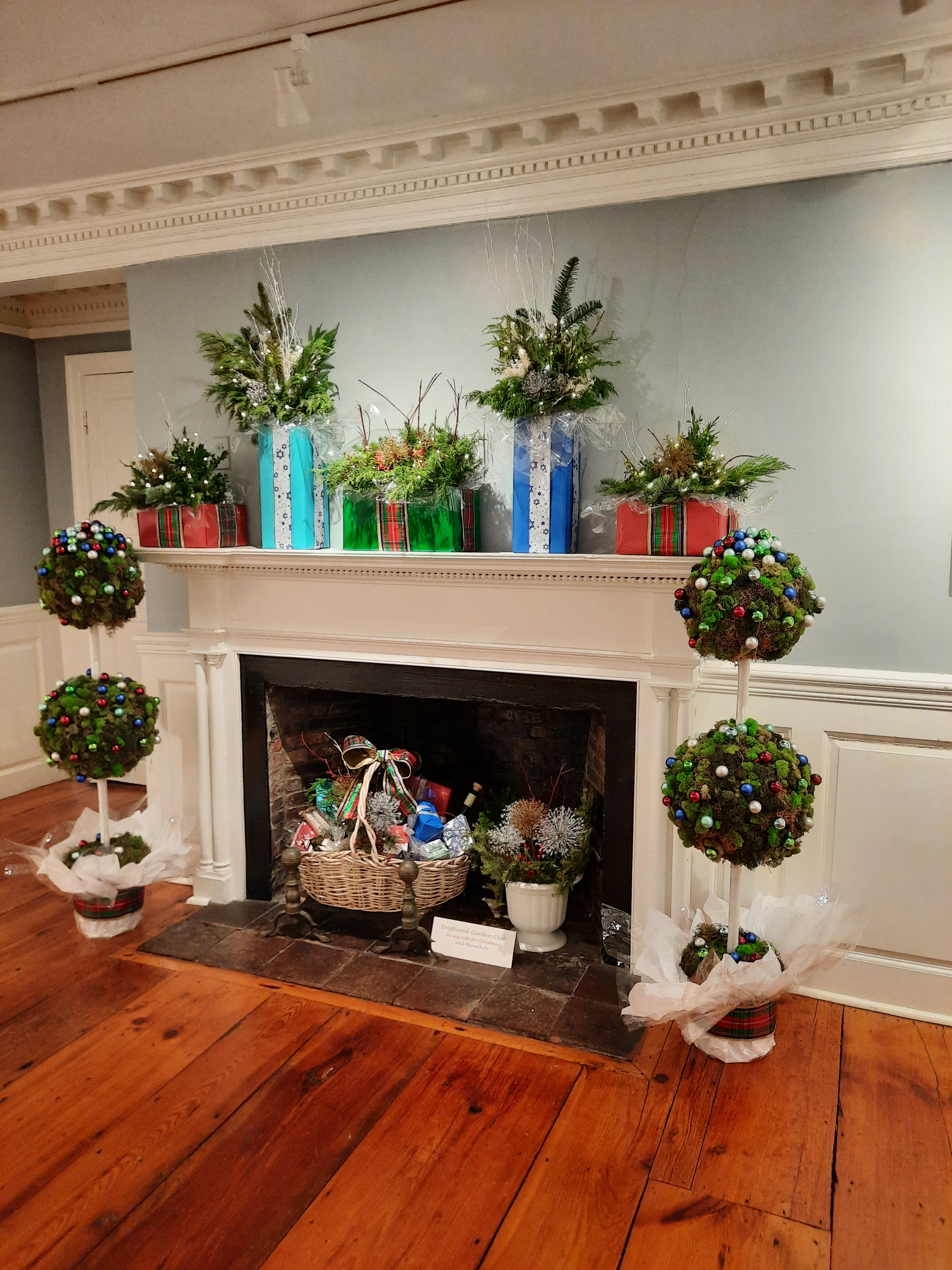
Back room of the Marblehead Arts Association in the King Hooper Mansion.

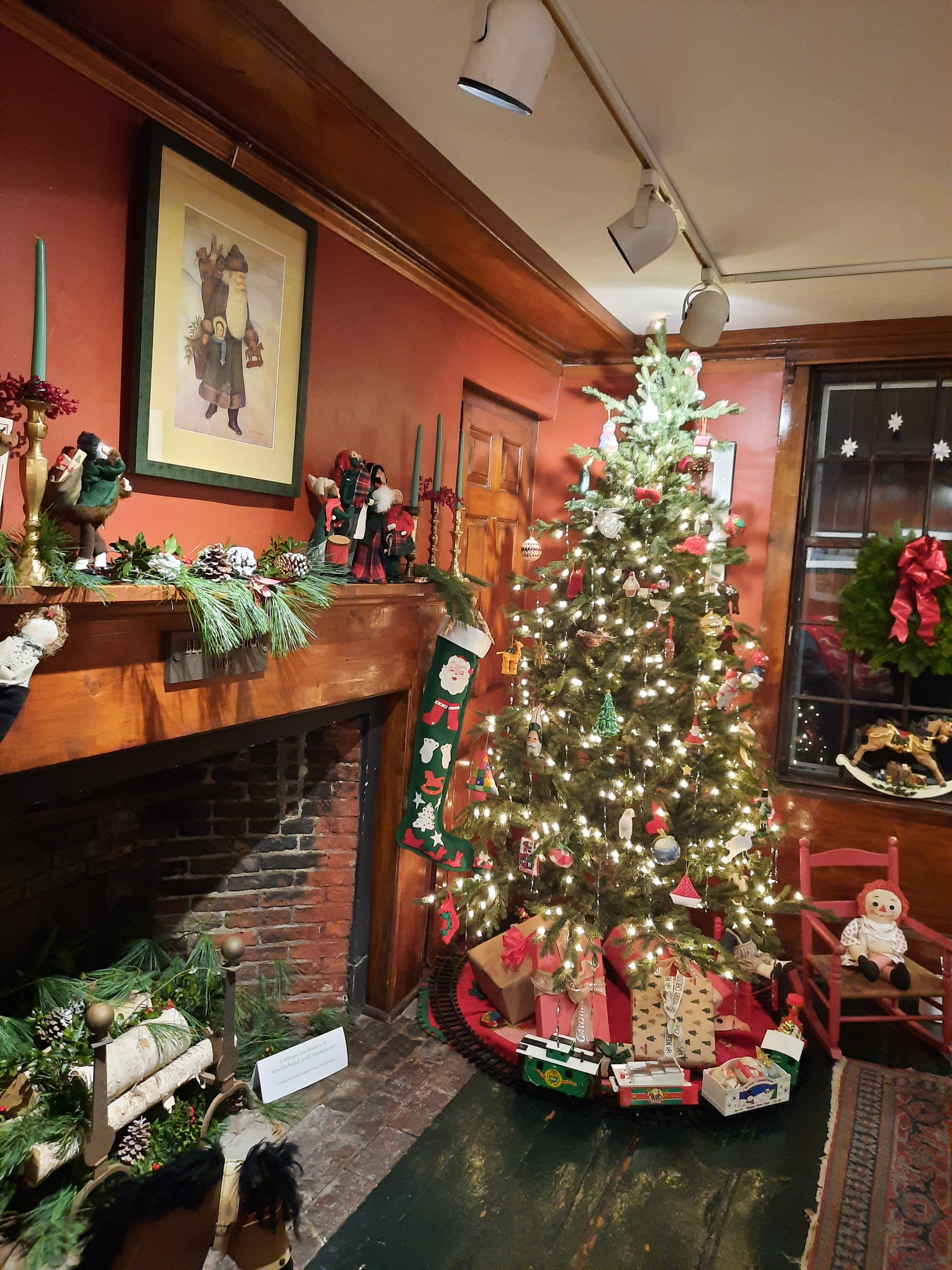
Back room of the Marblehead Arts Association in the King Hooper Mansion. Winter exhibit.

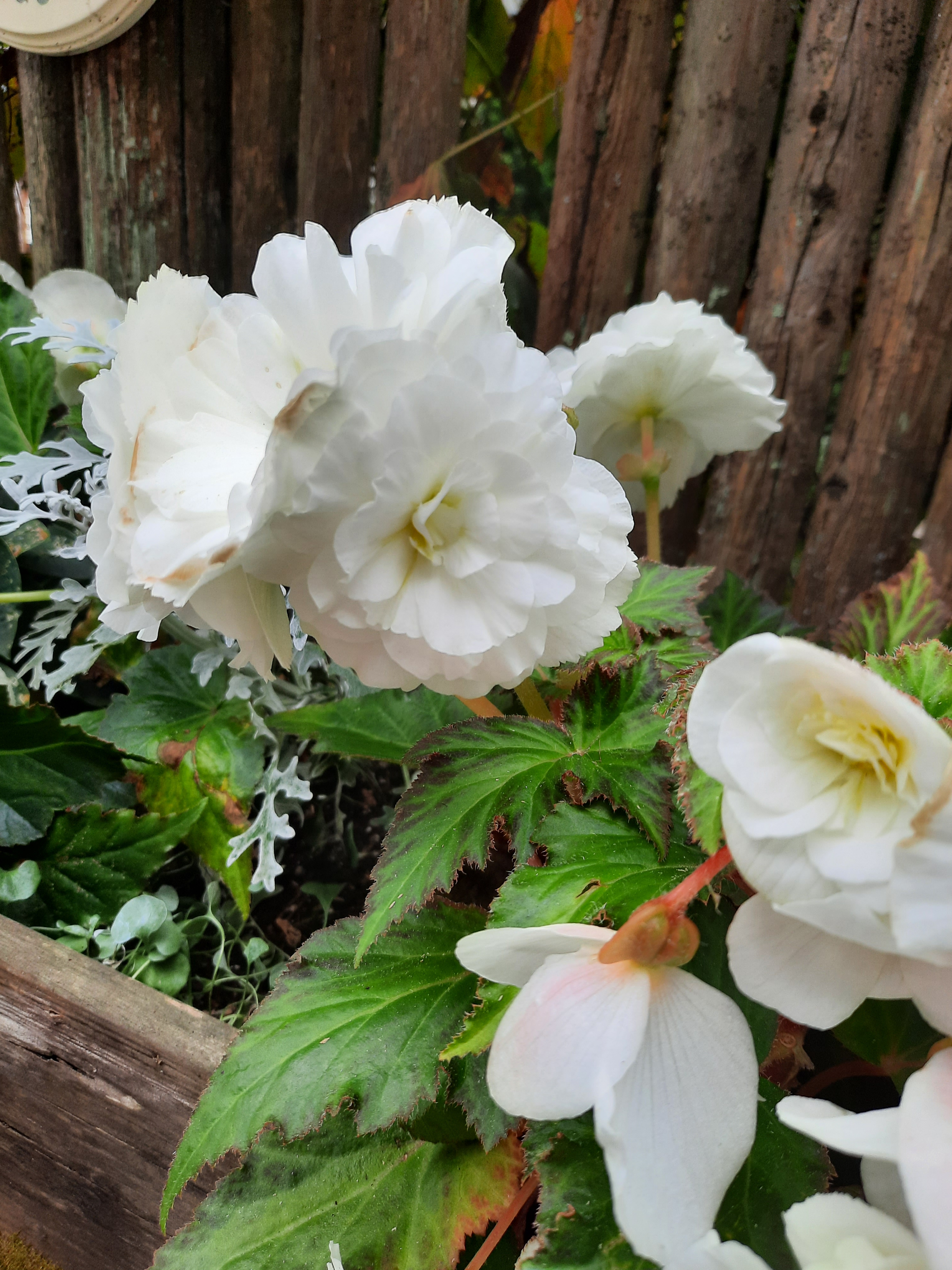
Garden behind the Marblehead Arts Association, King Hooper Mansion.

== See also ==
- The Lindens (Washington, D.C.)
- National Register of Historic Places listings in Essex County, Massachusetts
