= Robert Edwin Cook =

American architect

Robert E. Cook
- Born: July 19, 1863; Southeast Washington, D.C.
- Died: July 27, 1946 (aged 83); Northwest Washington, D.C.
- Occupation: Architect
- Projects: Spanish Steps (Washington, D.C.)

Robert Edwin Cook (July 19, 1863 – July 27, 1946) or Robert E. Cook, as he is more commonly known, was an American architect and engineer. Robert E. Cook is most famous for his design of Washington, D.C.'s Spanish Steps. The native Washingtonian was a prominent figure in Washington, D.C., society throughout the early 1900s.

== Early life ==
Robert was born to George R. and Annie Cook on July 19, 1863, in Southeast Washington, D.C. As a youth, he was an active member of the old Fourth Street Methodist Church.

Robert married Mary Lizzie Thompson on September 2, 1899, in Newtonville, Massachusetts. Robert and Mary had one daughter, Julia Thompson Lindquist (née Cook).

== Career ==
Cook spent much of his architectural career with Hornblower & Marshall, the architect and engineering firm responsible for numerous buildings in Washington, D.C. Cook had a part in designing many of the city's prominent residences and some public buildings. Robert E. Cook designed the Decatur Terrace Steps and Fountain in northwest Washington, D.C., which was completed in 1911.

In October 1911, Robert E. Cook was appointed to Assistant Inspector of Buildings by the District Commissioners, upon recommendation of Municipal Architect Snowden Ashford.

== Personal life ==
Robert E. Cook was an active member of Washington society, especially in his native Congress Heights and Bellevue area of the city. He belonged to Washington's Society of Natives, the Washington Centennial Masonic Lodge, the Congress Heights Citizens' Association and the Washington Architectural Club. Cook was a member of the Vestry of his church, the Congress Heights P. E. parish, and was on the board of trustees to his childhood church, the Fourth Street Methodist Church, for a number of years.

Robert's wife, Mary Lizzie Cook (née Thompson), was also prominent in the community. Mary was a member of the Twentieth Century Club, Daughters of the American Revolution, Woman's Christian Temperance Union, Women's Missionary Society, Interdenominational Society, and was active in the community welfare work of Calvary M. E. Church. Robert and Mary frequently entertained guests and hosted large gatherings at their home in Southeast Washington, D.C.

== Later life ==
Robert became widowed in 1927, when Mary died at age 59. He spent the final years of his life living with his daughter, Julia, and her husband, Clarence Lindquist, in the Kenesaw Apartment building in Northwest Washington, D.C. Robert died at age 83 at their home and was buried in the Westminster Cemetery in Westminster, Maryland.
