= Frances Perkins House =

- U.S. National Register of Historic Places
- U.S. National Historic Landmark
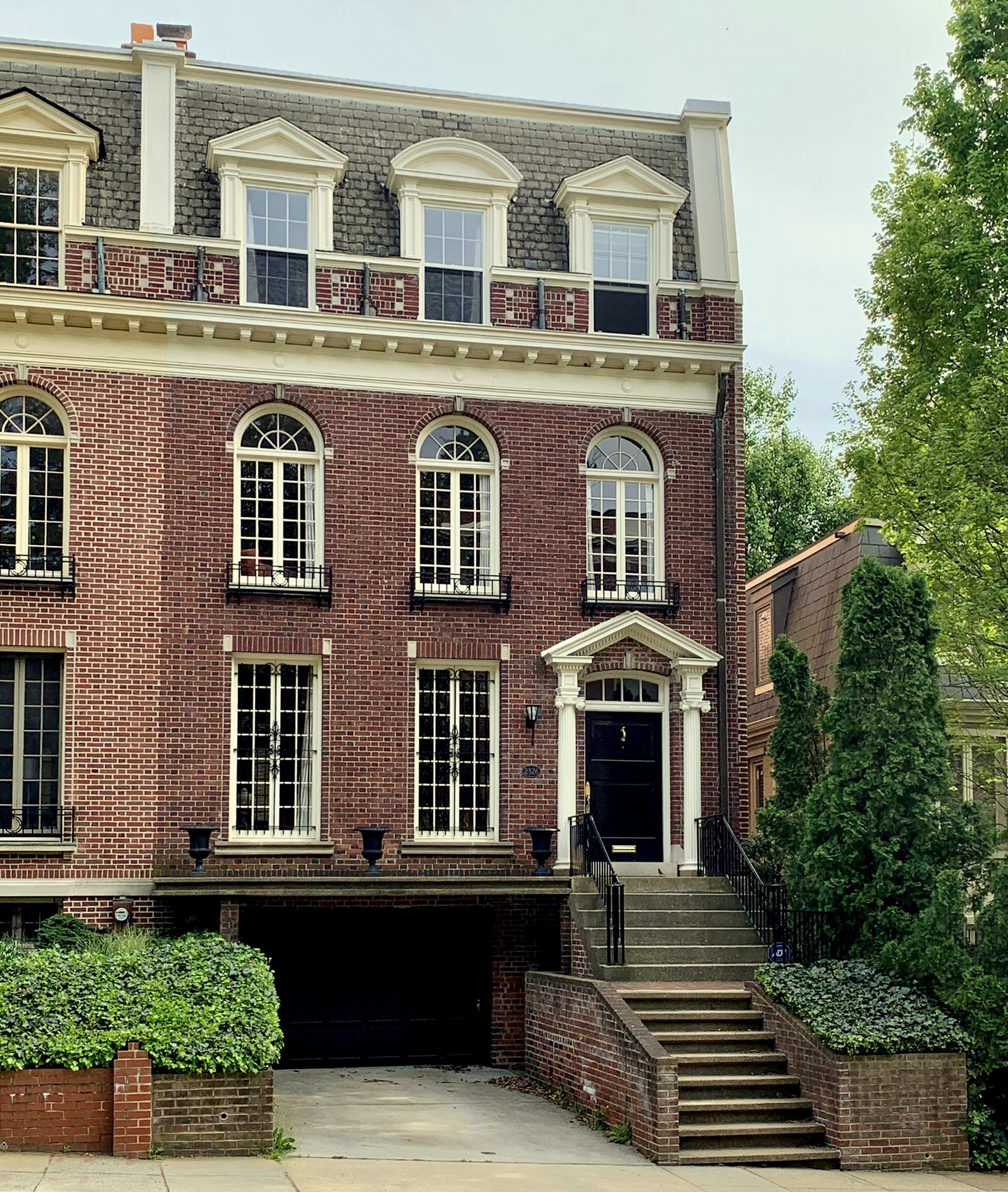
- Frances Perkins House in 2022

- Location within Washington, D.C.
- Location: 2326 California St., NW., Washington, D.C.
- Coordinates: 38°54′55.4″N 77°3′5.45″W
- Architect: Alexander H. Sonneman
- Architectural style: Colonial Revival
- NRHP reference No.: 91002048

Significant dates
- Added to NRHP: July 17, 1991
- Designated NHL: July 17, 1991

The Frances Perkins House is a historic house at 2326 California Street NW in Washington, D.C. Built in 1914, it was from 1937 to 1940 the home of Frances Perkins (1880-1965), the first woman to serve in the United States Cabinet. Perkins was the Secretary of Labor under president Franklin Delano Roosevelt, and was a major force in advancing his New Deal agenda. This house was declared a National Historic Landmark in 1991.

== Description and history ==
The Frances Perkins House is located in Washington's Sheridan-Kalorama neighborhood, on the south side of California Street roughly midway between 23rd and 24th Streets. It is the right hand side of two identical brick townhouses, which were originally built as mirror images of each other. They are three bays wide, with entrance in the outer bays, with segmented-arch transom windows and shallow pedimented porticos with engaged Ionic columns. Second-floor windows are set in rounded-arch openings, while the mansarded third floor has dormers with gabled and segmented-arch pediments. The interior of the Perkins House retains high quality woodwork, particularly in the main parlor.

The house was built in 1914, and was from 1937 to 1940 home to Frances Perkins. She served as Roosevelt's Labor Secretary from 1933 until 1945, the only one of his cabinet appointees to serve through all of his terms. Prior to this high-profile role, she had been active in improving working conditions and pay for the working classes, and as Secretary of Labor, she was instrumental in pushing for many elements of the New Deal. In addition to temporary measures such as the Public Works Administration and the Civilian Conservation Corps, she also helped draft legislation creating Social Security. Of the residences she occupied while in the post, this is one she lived in the longest.

== See also ==
- Frances Perkins National Monument, Perkins Homestead, her family home in Maine, a National Monument
- List of National Historic Landmarks in Washington, D.C.
- National Register of Historic Places listings in the upper NW Quadrant of Washington, D.C.
