= William E. Borah Apartment, Windsor Lodge =

- U.S. National Register of Historic Places
- U.S. National Historic Landmark
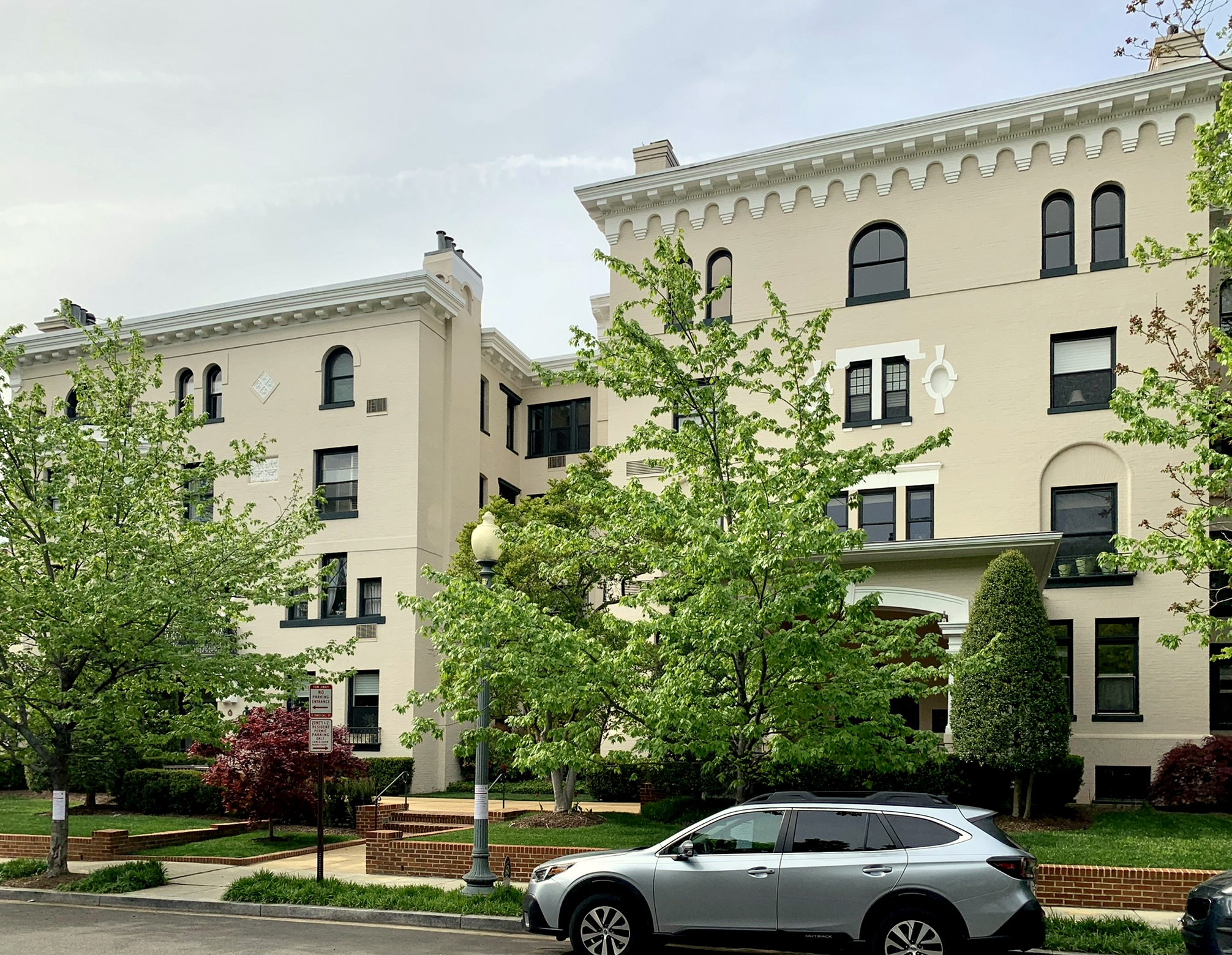
- Windsor Lodge in 2022

- Location within Washington, D.C.
- Location: 2139–2141 Wyoming Ave., NW, Washington, D.C.
- Coordinates: 38°55′3″N 77°2′57″W
- Built: 1913
- NRHP reference No.: 76002134

Significant dates
- Added to NRHP: December 8, 1976
- Designated NHL: December 8, 1976

The William E. Borah Apartment at Windsor Lodge is a historic apartment in a 16-unit apartment building at 2139-2141 Wyoming Avenue NW in Washington, D.C. Apartment 21 in the building was a long-time home of William Edgar Borah (1865–1940), a U.S. Senator from Idaho and a candidate for president in 1936. Borah was a leading figure in American foreign policy in the years after World War I, contributing to the American non-acceptance of the League of Nations and the acceptance of the Washington Naval Treaty of the early 1920s. This apartment is the best-preserved surviving residence of Borah; for its association with his life, the entire building was designated a National Historic Landmark in 1976.

== Description and history ==
The apartment complex formerly known as Windsor Lodge is located in Washington's Sheridan-Kalorama neighborhood, at the northeastern corner of Wyoming Avenue NW and Thornton Place NW. It consists of two four-story buildings joined by a party wall in a rear connecting section to form a U shape. Its walls are formed out of red brick that has been painted a cream color. The two halves of the building are stylistically similar, but are not identical, differing in plan and detail. Each has its main entrance in the center of its front facade; that on the left is sheltered by a wide bracketed hood that also forms a balcony on the second floor, while the right one has a more elaborate porch. William Borah's apartment was the one on the second floor right side of the eastern half.

Borah, a native of Illinois, studied law with his brother-in-law, and established a successful criminal law practice in Boise, Idaho in 1890. He soon became active in Republican Party politics, and won election to the United States Senate in 1907. There he became an influential member of the Foreign Relations Committee. He reluctantly supported US entry into World War I, but vociferously opposed the Treaty of Versailles and the creation of the League of Nations. He was somewhat maverick in his positions, frequently butting heads with party leadership, and sometimes supporting Democratic legislation. He was an outspoken progressive in the party when many of its members were more conservative.

This apartment served as William Borah's principal residence from 1913, not long after it was built, until 1929. It is one of two residences closely associated with his life; the other is also nearby in Washington. He did not own a home in Idaho.

== See also ==
- List of National Historic Landmarks in Washington, D.C.
- National Register of Historic Places listings in the upper NW Quadrant of Washington, D.C.
