= Meeting House of the Friends Meeting of Washington =

Historic church in Washington, D.C., United States

- U.S. National Register of Historic Places
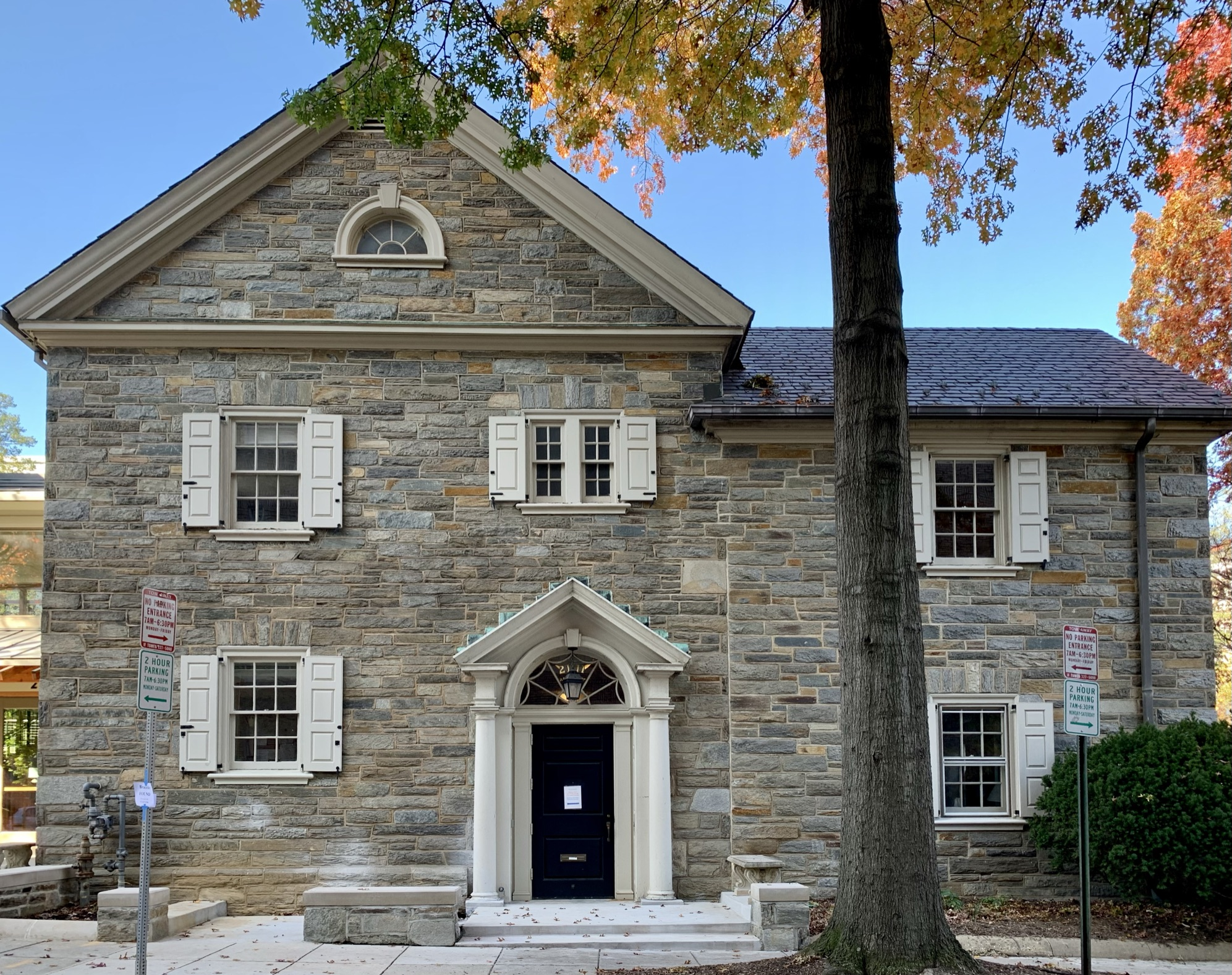
- Friends Meeting House in 2020

- Location within Central Washington, D.C. Location within the District of Columbia Location within the United States
- Location: 2111 Decatur Place NW. Washington, D.C.
- Coordinates: 38.9135°N 77.0475°W
- Area: less than one acre
- Architect: Price & Walton; Leon Chatelain Jr.
- Architectural style: Colonial Revival
- NRHP reference No.: 90001294
- Added to NRHP: September 06, 1990

Meeting House of the Friends Meeting of Washington (Friends Meeting House) is a historic Quaker meeting house at 2111 Decatur Place in NW Washington, DC.

The Colonial Revival building was added to the National Register of Historic Places in 1990.

== History ==
Surrounded by embassies, chanceries and military missions, the Meeting House of Friends Meeting of Washington was built in 1930 in a newly developed town house residential area. Twenty years later the building was enlarged on the south side. In 1970, the red brick town house and garden at 2121 Decatur Place, now known as Quaker House, was acquired for additional educational and community activities, and in 2019 the buildings were joined together with a new lobby and main entrance on Decatur Place.

The original grey stone structure, an outright gift to the Friends Meeting of Washington from a Rhode Island Quaker, has historical significance in the nation's capital. It was designed and built particularly to accommodate the then President, Herbert Hoover, a Quaker. The President and his wife, Lou Henry Hoover, worshipped here when in Washington. They attended the first meeting for Worship held January 4, 1931. The First Lady was present at the laying of the cornerstone. Secret Service arrangements were less formidable than now.

Of further historic interest, a ground floor room now used as an office has a beamed ceiling of timbers that had been built into the White House in 1814, part of the repair after the British burned Washington. The beams were removed during a later repair and renovation in 1927. The architect, Walter F. Price, located them in a local mill.

Most of the exterior of the Meeting House is faced with Foxcroft stone, an unusual, if not unique, facing stone on Washington area buildings. It has a lively grey coloring and a satin-like texture. The Foxcroft stone came from a quarry in Pennsylvania and is no longer available.

The grounds were landscaped by the well-known landscape architect, Rose Greeley. The landscaping and the placing of the building were intended to create a miniature park. The grounds of most urban Meeting Houses are enclosed by brick or stone walls which often shield a burial ground. The 2019 renovation completely reconfigured and terraced the west garden space.

A special feature of the terrace is a sun dial with the names of Fox, Penn and Woolman cut in stone and the inscription, “I mind the Light, dost Thou?” George Fox was the founder of the Society of Friends in 17th century England; William Penn established the “holy experiment” in Pennsylvania; John Woolman of New Jersey crusaded relentlessly against slavery in the 18th century.

Inside, the building is simple and functional. The Meeting Room with benches, about half of them facing each other, is used primarily for Meetings for Worship on Sundays, for weddings, memorial services, business meetings, lecture and other public gatherings. Visitors will note the absence of the usual features of church interiors: altar, pulpit or lectern, organ, choir space, stained glass, ornamentation, memorial tables and so on. None are necessary for worship after the manner of Friends-there is no minister, creed, sacrament, music, nor prescribed ritual. Silence is the basis for worship, although anyone who feels moved to do so may speak. Visitors are always welcome but prepared messages or forum discussions are not appropriate to the Meeting for Worship.

A library located on the same floor as the Meeting Room contains an extensive selection of books, pamphlets and periodicals of historical and current interest on the Society of Friends and Quaker social concerns.
