= Residence of the Ambassador of the Netherlands in Washington D.C. =

Residence of the Ambassador of the Netherlands, Washington, D.C.
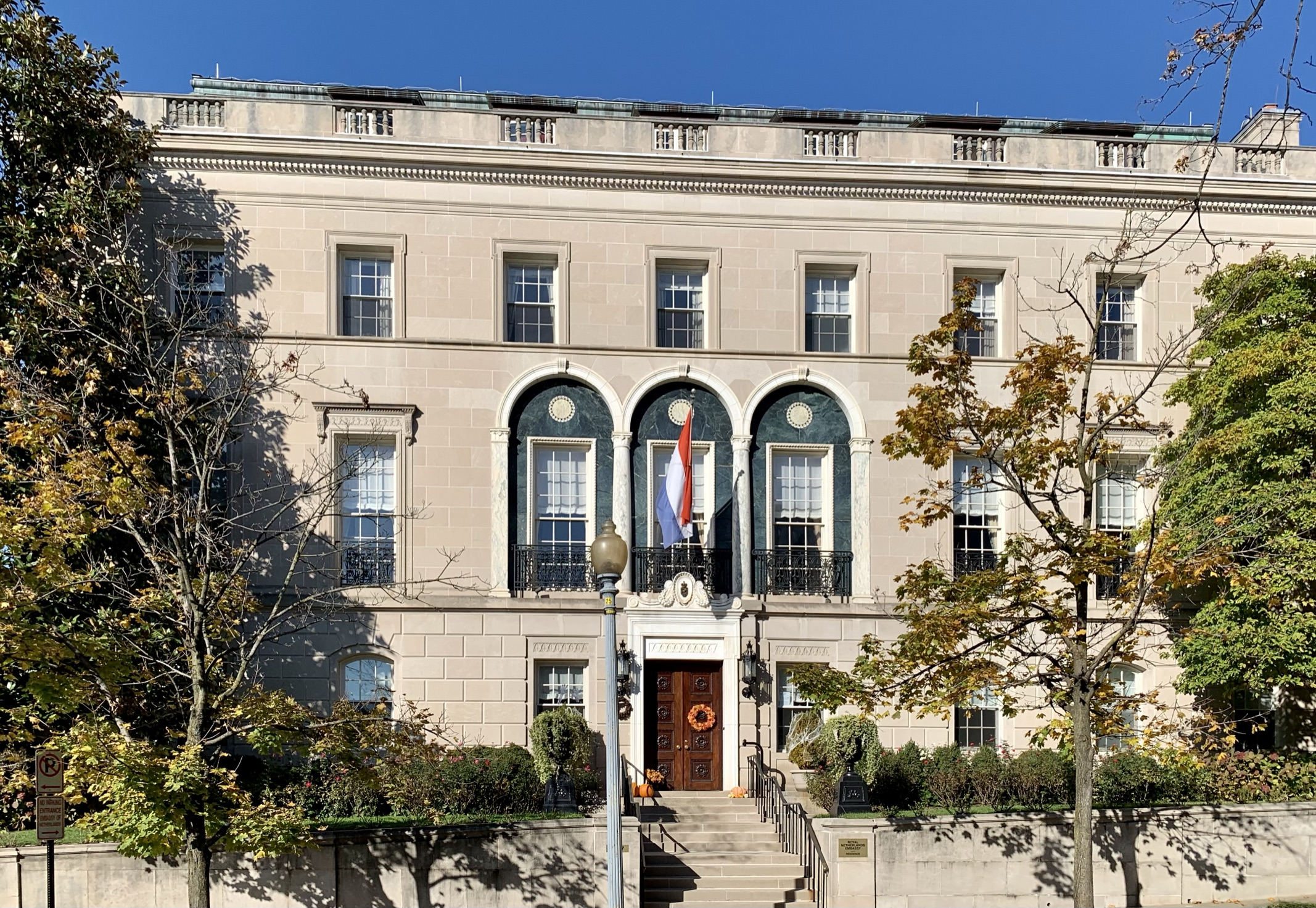
- Location: Washington, D.C.
- Address: 2347 S Street, N.W.
- Coordinates: 38°54′51.4886″N 77°3′8.1637″W

The Residence of the Ambassador of the Netherlands in Washington, D.C. is a diplomatic residence owned by the Netherlands in the United States located at 2347 S Street, Northwest, Washington, D.C. in the Sheridan-Kalorama neighborhood.
