= Spanish Steps (Washington, D.C.) =

Historic staircase in Washington, D.C.

Decatur Terrace
- Public stairs
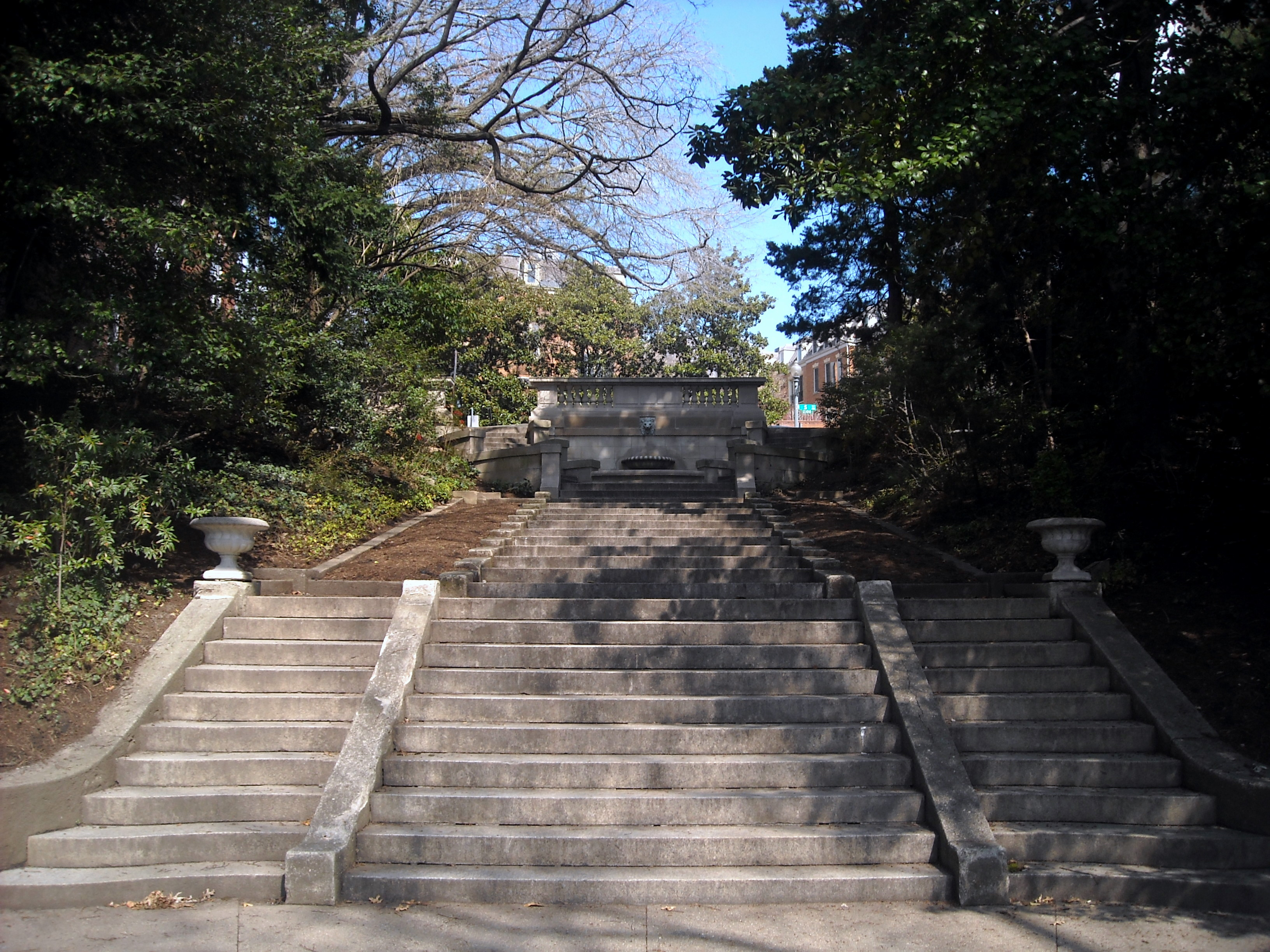
- Design: Robert E. Cook
- Opened: 1911
- Location: 22nd Street NW just south of S Street NW; Washington, D.C.
- Location of Spanish Steps in Washington DC
- Coordinates: 38°54′49″N 77°02′56″W

Decatur Terrace, commonly known as the Spanish Steps, is a terrace in the Kalorama neighborhood of Washington, D.C., located on 22nd Street NW, connecting Decatur Place NW and S Street NW. Formally named Decatur Terrace Steps and Fountain, the nickname is a reference to the Spanish Steps in Rome. Washington's Spanish Steps are listed in the National Register of Historic Places as a contributing feature in the Sheridan-Kalorama Historic District, designated in 1989.

== History ==
Bids for construction of Decatur Terrace opened in June 1905. Decatur Terrace was built in 1911. The Washington DC Municipal Office of Public Works and Grounds determined that the steep escarpment made construction of a street impractical, as it would require destroying adjacent building sites. A ramp would have been difficult for carriages and automobiles and uncomfortable for pedestrians. In 1905, District Commissioners decided to inaugurate a "park improvement idea" in lieu of a driveway. Property along the right-of-way was deeded to the city for the construction of steps and an adjacent park. Decatur Terrace is Washington's only example of a staircase constructed on land dedicated to a street.

The steps and fountain were designed by local architect Robert E. Cook for the Municipal Office of Public Works. The stone steps were designed following Beaux-Arts precepts, reflecting the aesthetic preferences made popular in Washington, D.C., by the City Beautiful movement.

The broad staircase has four levels. It is widest at its low, southern terminus near Decatur Place, transitioning upwards towards a shallow brick terrace and a second tier of stairs bordered by planting beds. Twin balustrade-lined steps curve around an oval-shaped basin before connecting to a broad terrace on S Street. A granite lion-head fountain is located in the basin at the top of the steps. The area is lined with a mix of magnolias, eastern red cedars, oaks, and other flowering trees. To the east of the Spanish Steps, a brick and stone retaining wall with balustrade creates and defines a formal side garden for the Codman-Davis House. The Codman-Davis House was built as a home for wealthy widows of the Confederate military.

Due to severe erosion and a car collision that destroyed the original stone balustrade and fountain, the steps and landscape were restored in 1999.

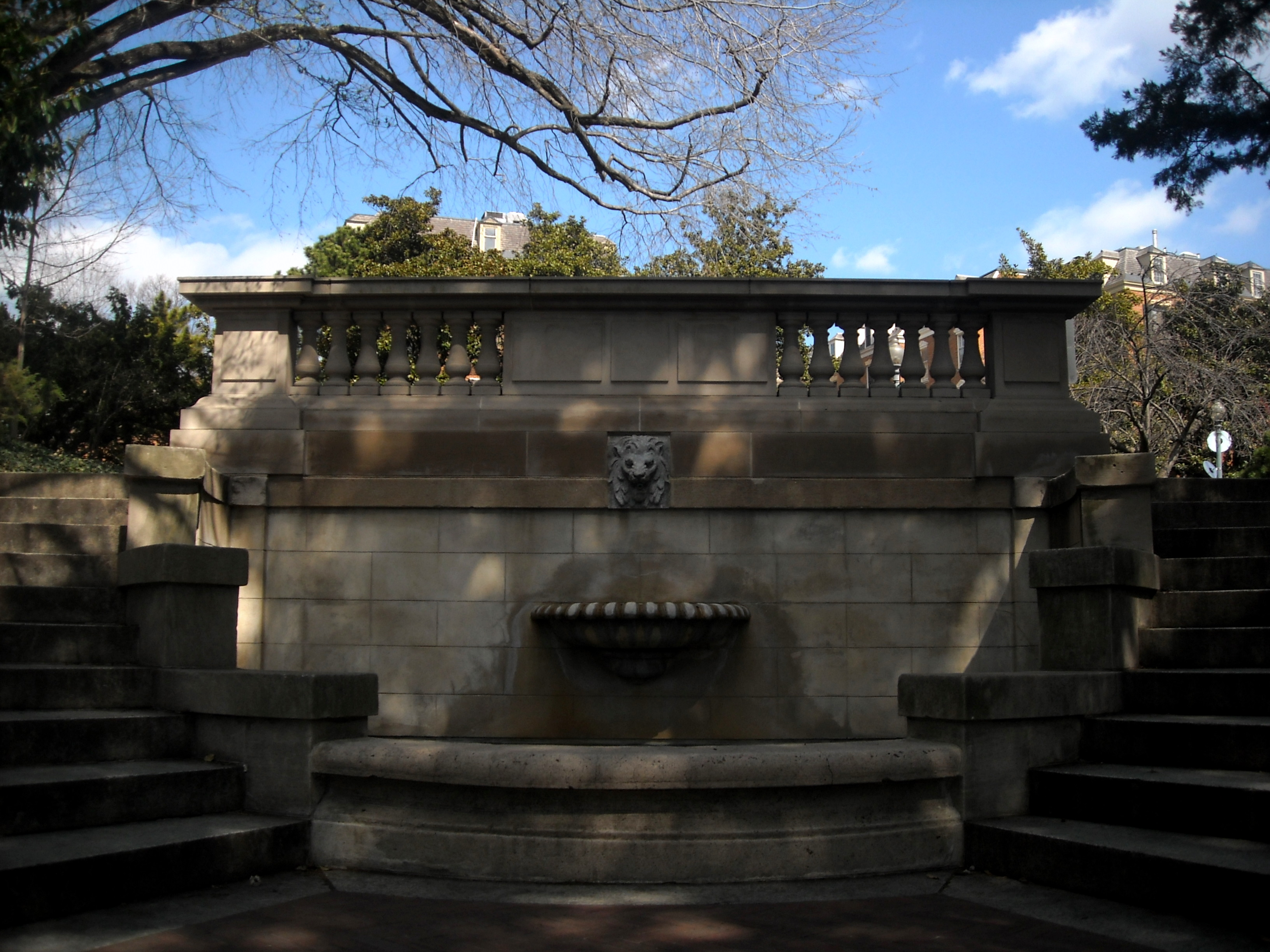
Lion-head fountain
