= Kalorama =

Kalorama, a Greek neologism signifying "nice view", may refer to:

- Kalorama, a music festival in Lisbon and Madrid
- Kalorama Heights, Washington, D.C., a historic neighborhood comprising
  - Kalorama Triangle Historic District, Washington, D.C.
  - Kalorama Park and Archeological Site, a park in the Kalorama Triangle Historic District
  - Sheridan-Kalorama Historic District, Washington, D.C.
- Kalorama, Victoria, a suburb of Melbourne in Australia
