= Malta–United States relations =

- Malta: United States

According to a 2010 American Community Survey, there are roughly 35,103 Maltese Americans residing in the United States.

According to the 2012 U.S. Global Leadership Report, 21% of Maltese people approve of U.S. leadership, with 15% disapproving and 64% uncertain.

== History ==
=== Early Hospitaller–United States relations ===
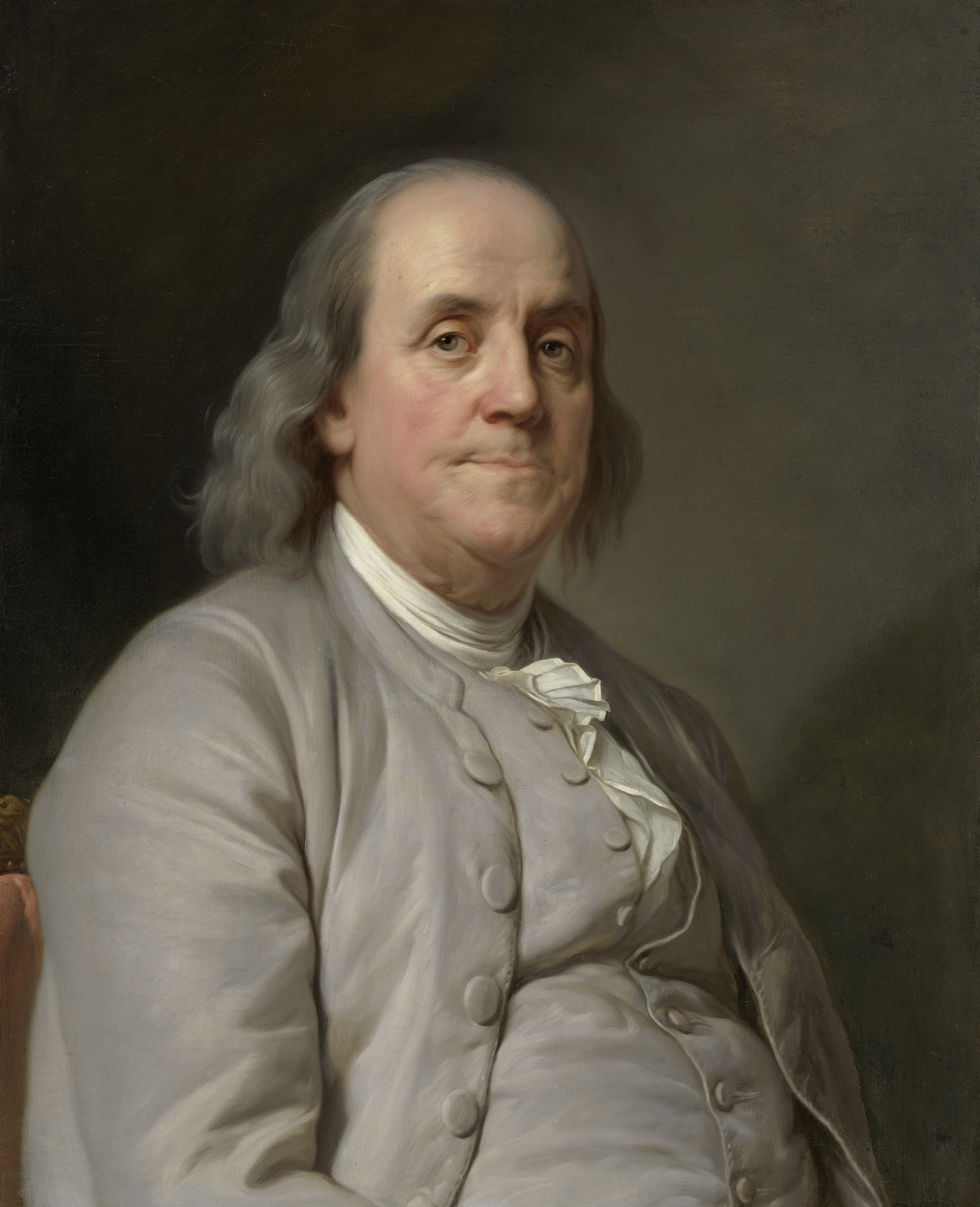
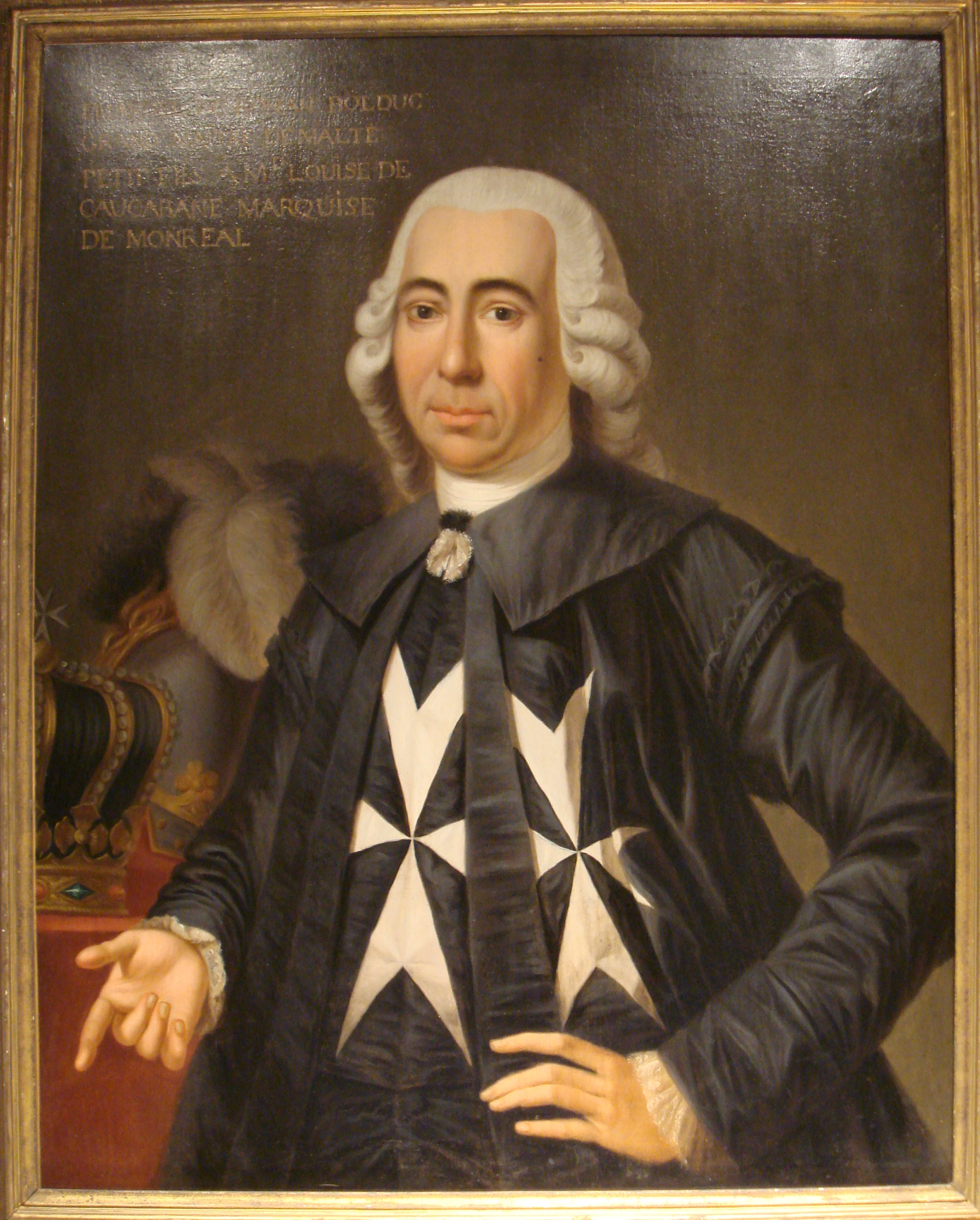
Benjamin Franklin (left) awarded Emmanuel de Rohan-Polduc (right) with a Libertas Americana medal in 1783

At the time of the American Revolutionary War which established the United States, Malta was a de facto independent vassal state ruled by the Order of St. John. During the war, the French Navy included 1,800 Maltese and knights of the Order, who played a role during the decisive Battle of the Chesapeake in 1781. Two years later, the United States Ambassador to France Benjamin Franklin presented a Libertas Americana medal to Grand Master Emmanuel de Rohan-Polduc, thanking him for supporting the American cause. Franklin also asked de Rohan to allow American ships in Maltese ports, and the latter granted this request. The first United States Consul to Malta was appointed in 1796.

John Pass (Pace), who recast the Liberty Bell in 1753, was of Maltese origin.

=== British Malta ===
During the First Barbary War of 1801–05, American ships were allowed to take in water and provisions from Maltese ports.

According to Diane Andreassi:

During the first decade of the nineteenth century American ships brought a variety of goods to Malta, including flour, rice, pepper, salted meat, rum, tobacco, and mahogany wood from Boston and Baltimore, as well as dried fruits, cotton, wax, pearls, goat hides, coffee, potatoes, drugs, and sponges from Smyrne and the Greek archipelago. Trade would rise and fall cyclically. Malta's biggest boon of American shipping was during the Crimean War, between 1854 and 1856, when Great Britain and France were fighting Russia. Malta also emerged as a stepping stone in the wool trade between Barbary and the United States because it received wool from different ports in North Africa for shipment to the United States. Later, American tobacco was shipped to Barbary and Sicily through Malta....Malta also imported petroleum, rum, pepper, flour, log-wood, pitch, resin, turpentine, coffee, sugar, cloves, codfish, wheat, cheese, butter, and lard. Meanwhile, the island nation exported to the United States goods such as olive oil, lemons, sulfur, ivory, salt, rags, goat skins, stoneware, soap, sponges, and donkeys.

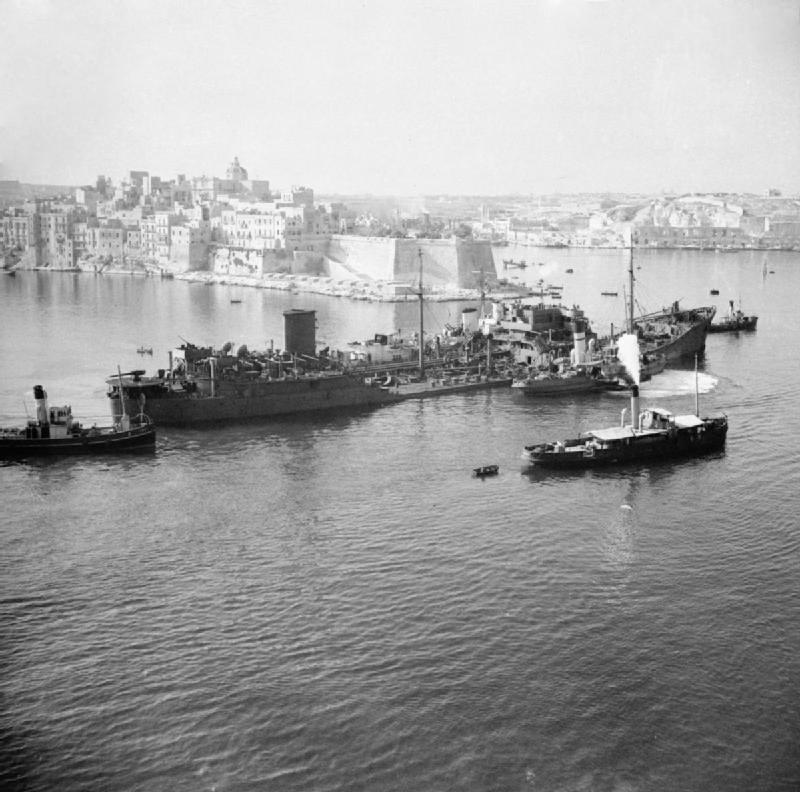
The damaged American oil tanker SS Ohio arriving in Malta, 15 August 1942

During World War II, some American ships took part in Operation Pedestal, a British convoy meant to supply Malta with critical supplies in August 1942. Most notably, the American tanker SS Ohio supplied crucial fuel and food to the islands. Later on in 1942, the aircraft carrier USS Wasp twice delivered Spitfires to Malta.

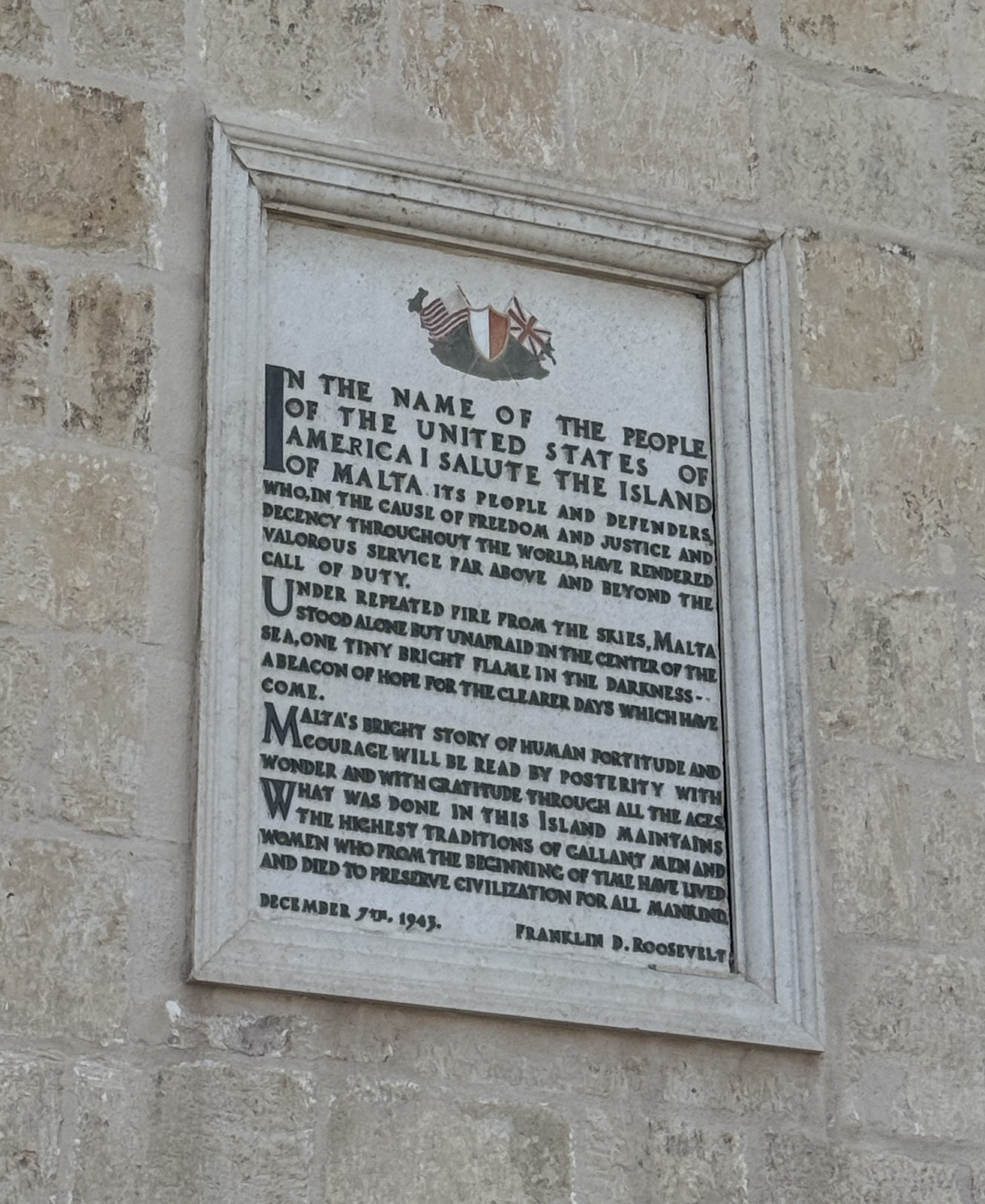
A plaque on the Grandmaster's Palace, Valletta memorialising Roosevelt's remarks

General Dwight D. Eisenhower and Italian Prime Minister Pietro Badoglio signed an armistice in September 1943 on board HMS Nelson while anchored in Malta's Grand Harbour. Later on in 1943, U.S. President Franklin D. Roosevelt visited Malta described the island as "one tiny bright flame in the darkness – a beacon of hope for the clearer days which have come."

Maltese Prime Minister George Borg Olivier met the US President John F. Kennedy at the White House on 19 September 1963, a year before Malta's independence.

=== Since Maltese independence ===
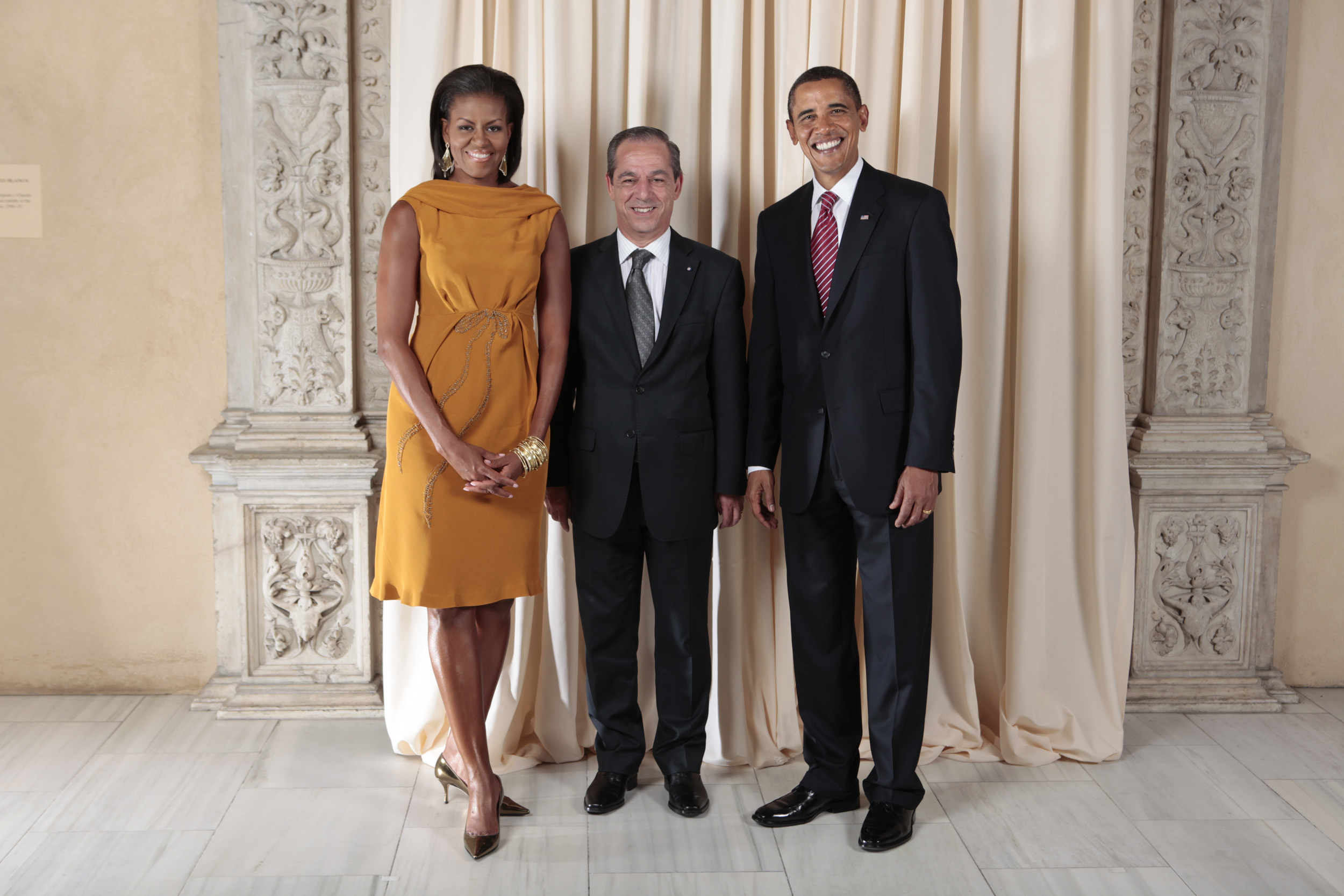
Maltese Prime Minister Lawrence Gonzi with U.S. President Barack Obama and First Lady Michelle Obama, September 2009

Malta and the United States established full diplomatic relations upon Malta's independence in 1964; overall relations are positive. The United States has been sympathetic to Malta's campaign to attract private investment, and some firms operating in Malta have U.S. ownership or investment. These include major hotels, manufacturing and repair facilities, and some offices servicing local and regional operations.

The Maltese Prime Minister Eddie Fenech Adami met U.S. President Ronald Reagan at the White House in July 1988. On 2–3 December 1989, U.S. President George H. W. Bush met Soviet leader Mikhail Gorbachev at the Malta Summit in Marsaxlokk Bay, where they officially declared an end to the Cold War.

In 2005, the Maltese Prime Minister Lawrence Gonzi met U.S. President George W. Bush at the White House. Malta acted as an evacuation point for US and other citizens during the Libyan Civil War in 2011. That year, Secretary of State Hillary Clinton briefly visited Malta while returning from Libya. Prime Minister Joseph Muscat met President Barack Obama a number of times.

On 10 August 2019, the governments of both Malta and the United States issued a joint statement emphasizing the countries' "friendship and close collaboration".

== Embassies ==
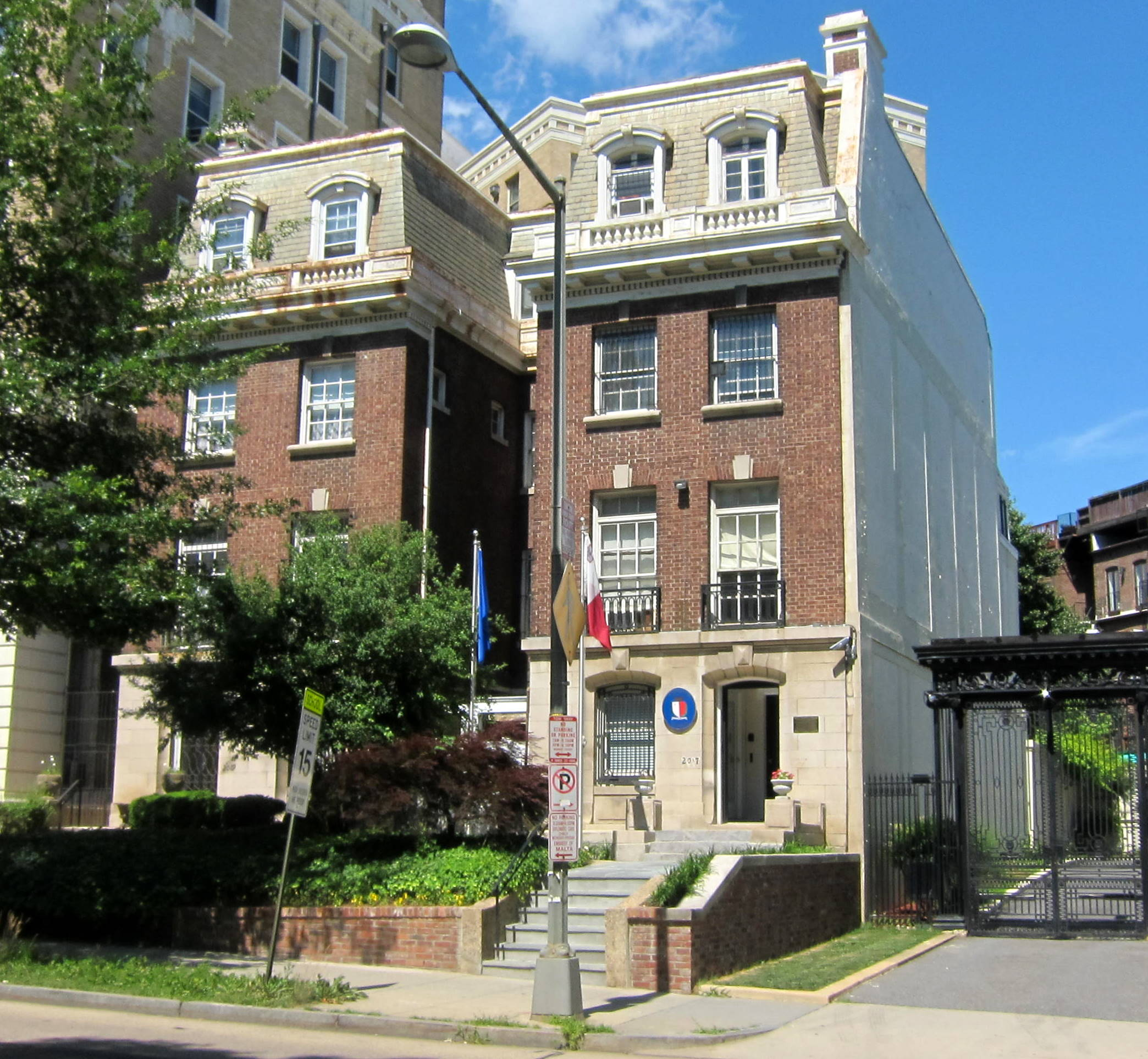
Embassy of Malta in Washington, D.C.

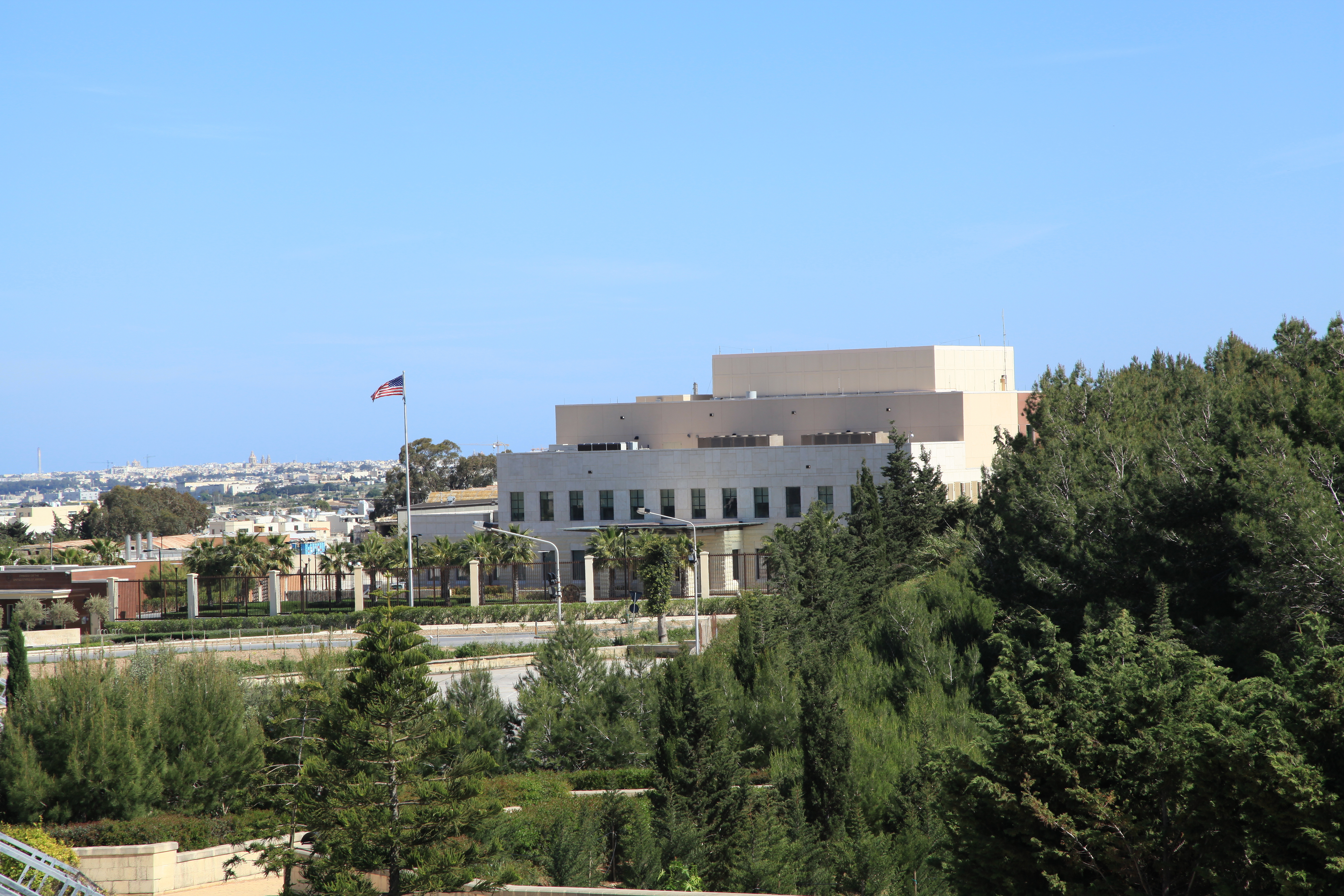
Embassy of the United States in Ta' Qali

The United States established its embassy in Malta in 1964. It was originally located in the capital Valletta, but it eventually moved to Sliema. It moved to Floriana in 1974, and again to a new building in Ta' Qali National Park in Attard in 2011.

Malta has an embassy in Washington, D.C.

== See also ==
- Foreign relations of Malta
- Foreign relations of United States
- Malta-NATO relations
- United States-EU relations
- NATO-EU relations
- Maltese Americans
- List of ambassadors of the United States to Malta
