= Lothrop Mansion =

Historic house in Washington, D.C., United States

- U.S. National Register of Historic Places
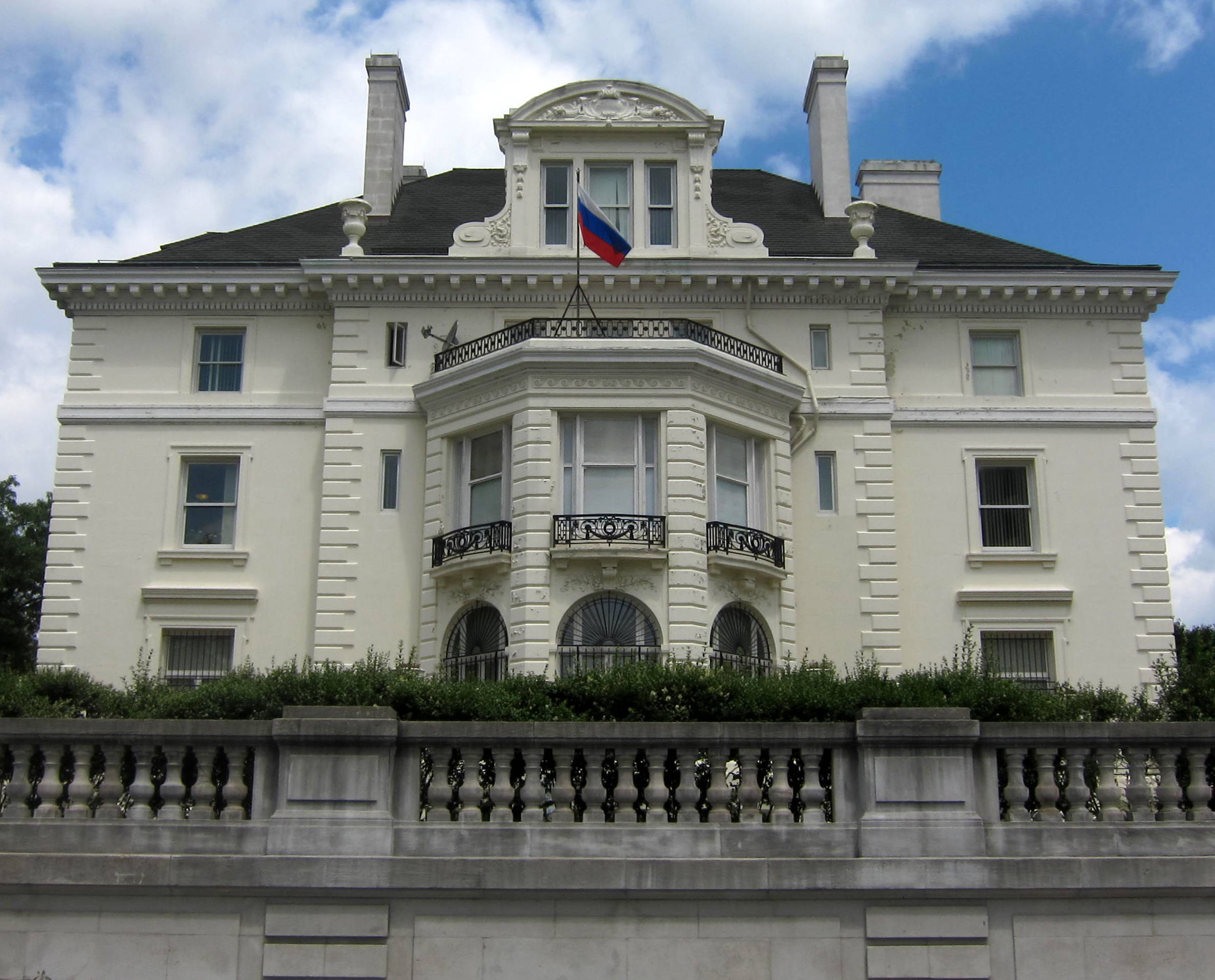
- Lothrop Mansion in 2010

- Location within Washington, D.C.
- Location: 2001 Connecticut Avenue, NW; Washington, D.C.
- Coordinates: 38°55′1″N 77°2′48″W
- Area: less than one acre
- Built: 1908-1909
- Architect: Hornblower and Marshall
- Architectural style: Beaux Arts
- NRHP reference No.: 88001346
- Added to NRHP: December 20, 1988

The Lothrop Mansion, also known as the Alvin Mason Lothrop House, is a historic Beaux Arts home, located at 2001 Connecticut Avenue, Northwest, Washington, D.C., in the Kalorama Triangle neighborhood.

The Lothrop Mansion is listed on the National Register of Historic Places, and is designated as a contributing property to the Kalorama Triangle Historic District.

The home is currently owned by the Russian government.

== History ==
The Beaux Arts home was designed by local Washington D.C. architects Hornblower and Marshall for Alvin Mason Lothrop, and was built from 1908 till 1909 at a cost of $100,000. The home is three stories high, is a masonry-bearing structure, is Indiana limestone-faced, and was constructed to hold 40 rooms.

After Alvin Lothrop's death, ownership of the home was given to his daughter Harriet Luttrell. In 1914 Harriet and her husband Nathaniel Luttrel rented the house to socialite Carrie B. Wals, the widow of Thomas Walsh. In 1916 the city directory lists Harriet and her family as residents in the house. From 1917 till 1920 the house was rented to Thomas Fortune Ryan. From 1920 till 1942 Harriet and Nathaniel Luttrel resided in the house until Nathaniel's death on 23 June 1942. After his passing equal shares of the estate, which was valued at $1.25 million, were passed onto their children Nancy Lee Orme and Nathaniel H. Luttrell Jr.

In 1943 the Soviet government began leasing the home from Nancy Orme and Nathaniel Luttrell Jr. The USSR initially used the home as its embassy's chancellery (USSR Office of the Attache). In December 1975 the USSR purchased the home from the Luttrell family and used it as the office for the USSR Trade Representative until the end of the Soviet era. In the 1970s the interior was reported to have been remodeled by the USSR.

Until a scale-back in Russian diplomatic presence in 2017, the Lothrop Mansion housed offices for the Russian Trade Representation.

== Gallery ==
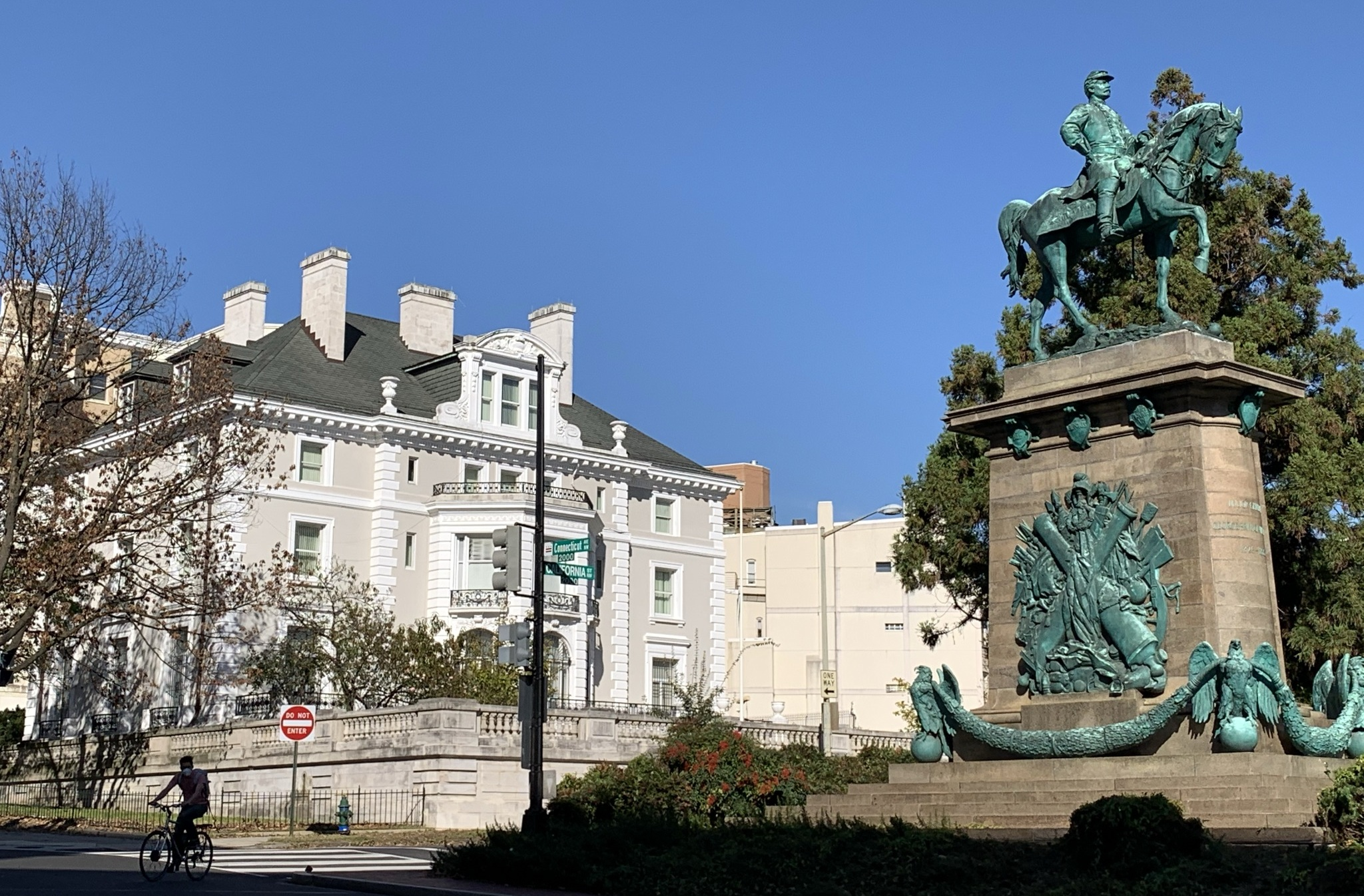
Lothrop Mansion and McClellan Monument

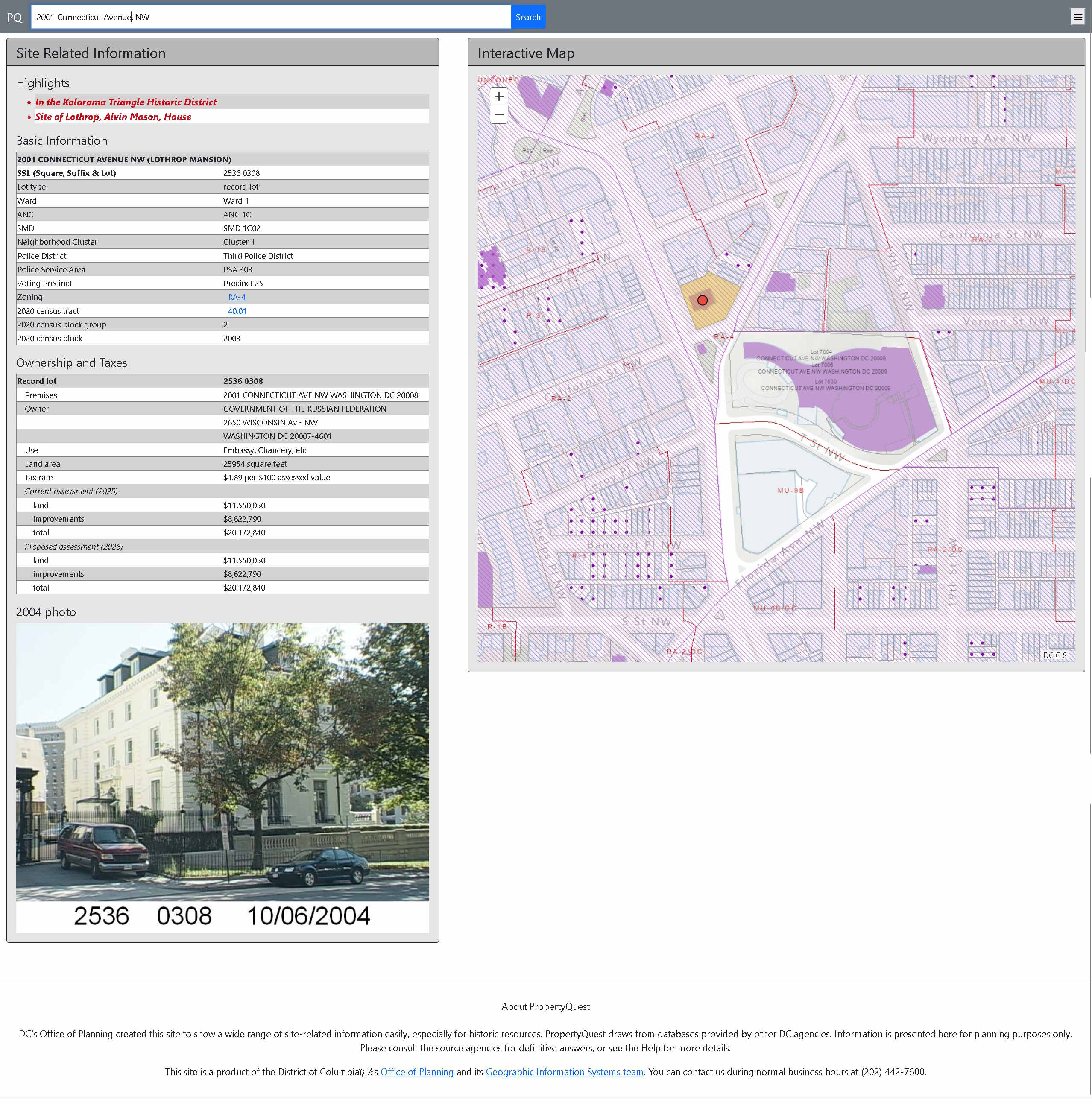
Russian Government ownership from dc.gov

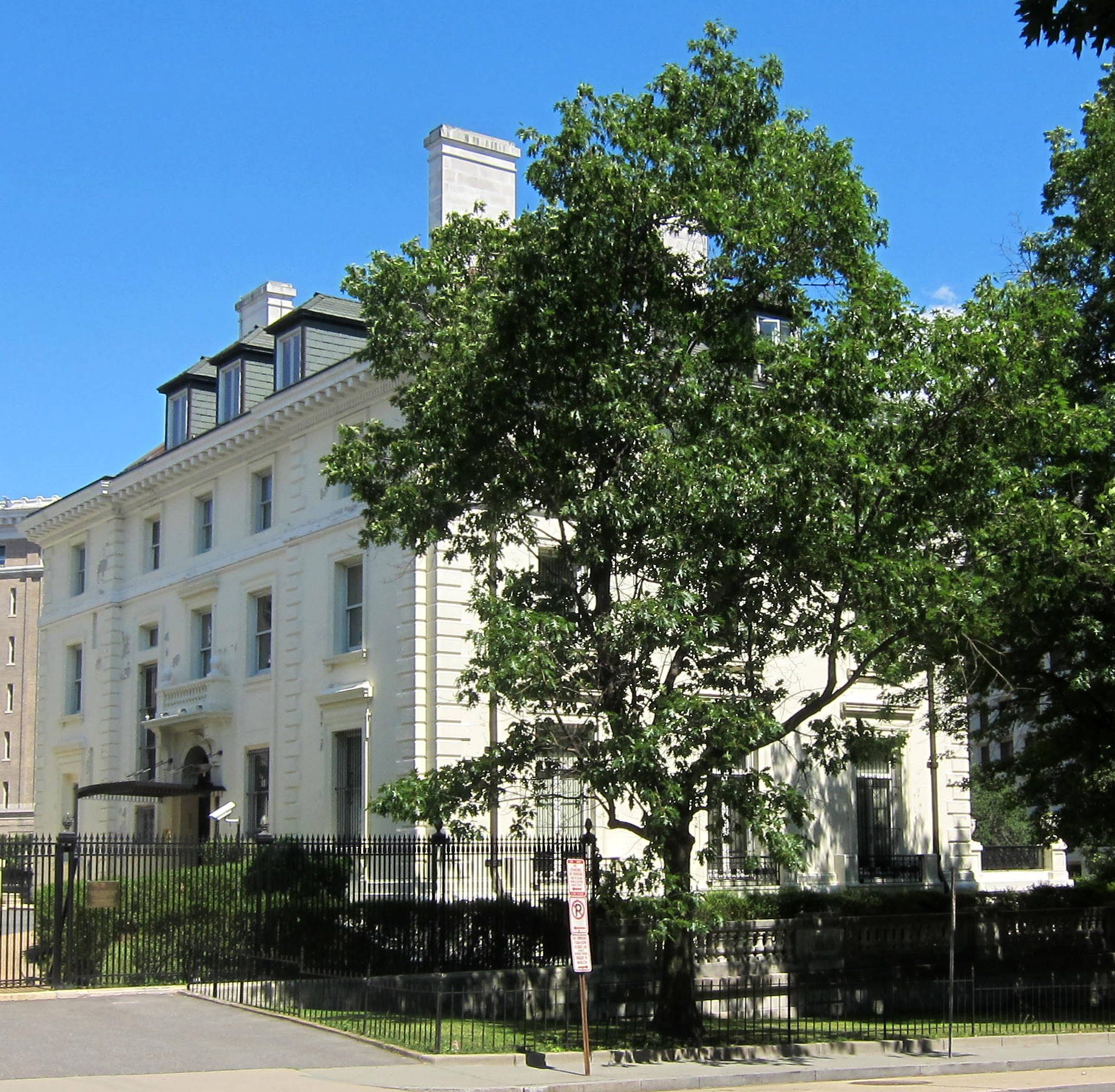

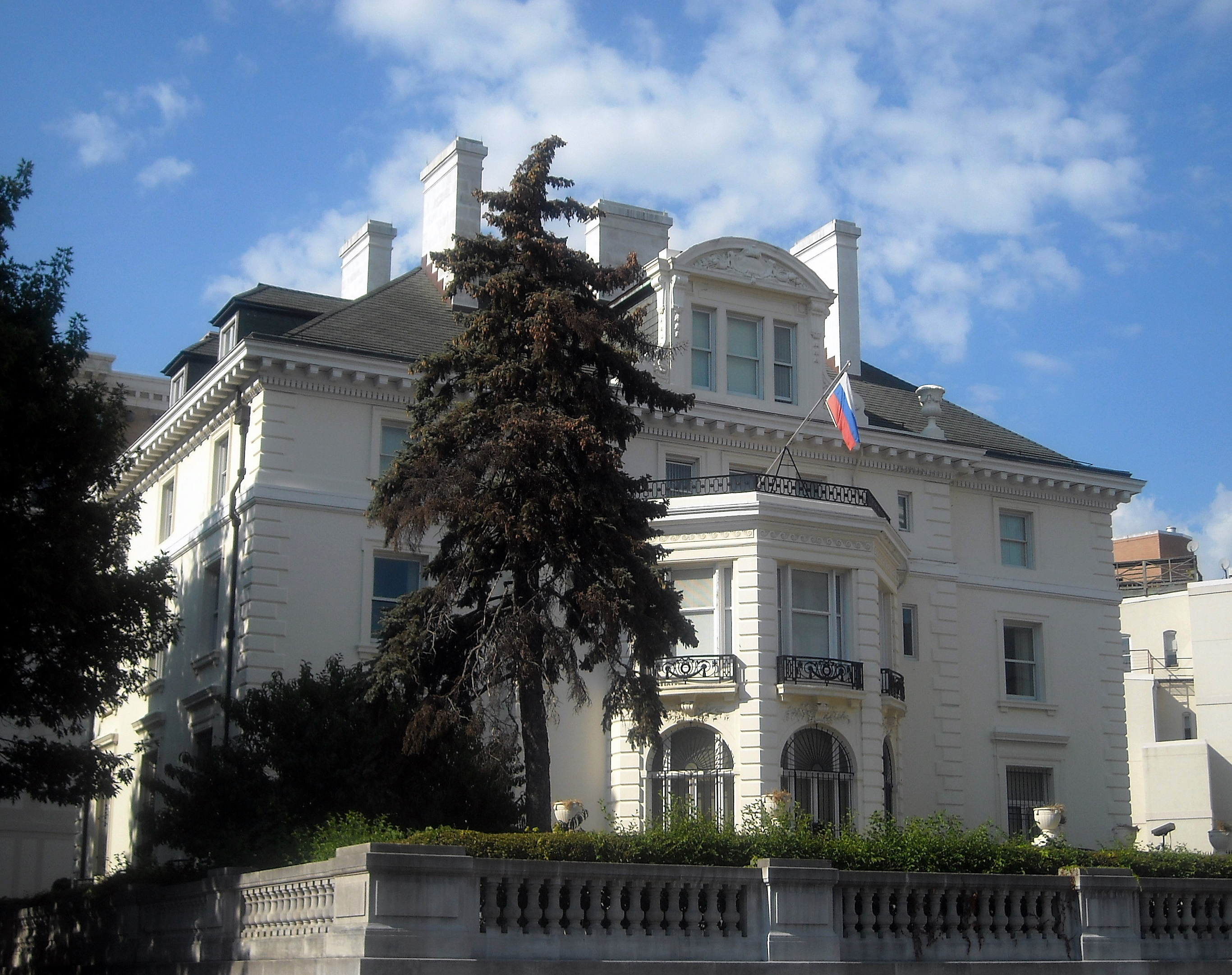

== See also ==
- List of diplomatic missions of Russia
- List of ambassadors of Russia to the United States
- National Register of Historic Places listings in the District of Columbia
