= Fuller House (Washington, D.C.) =

Historic house in Washington, D.C., United States

- U.S. National Register of Historic Places
- U.S. Historic district – Contributing property
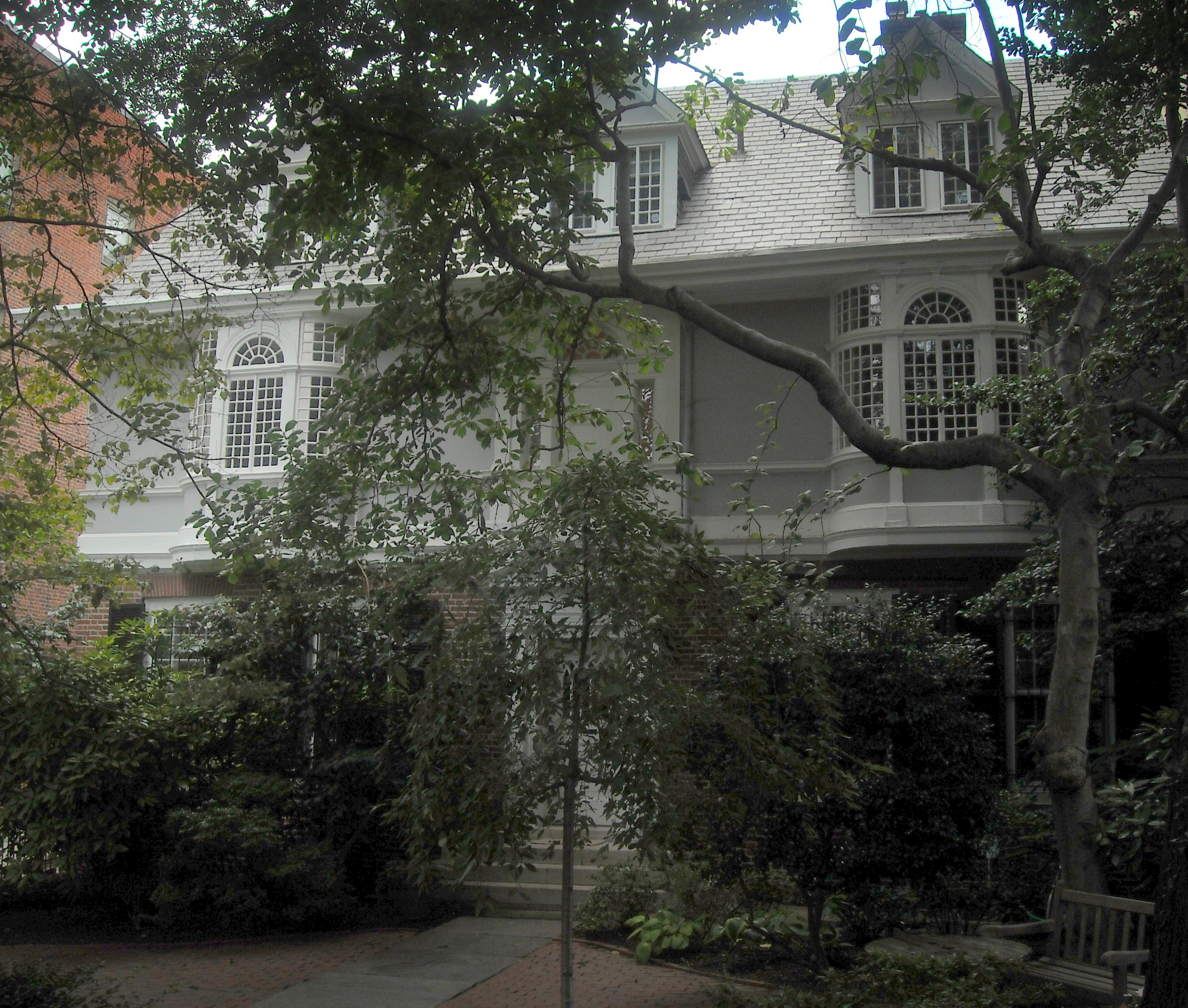

- Location within Washington, D.C.
- Location: 2317 Ashmead Pl., NW; Washington, D.C.
- Coordinates: 38°55′8″N 77°2′53″W
- Built: 1893
- Architect: Thomas J.D. Fuller
- NRHP reference No.: 85000302
- Added to NRHP: February 21, 1985

Fuller House is an historic house in the Kalorama Triangle neighborhood of Washington, D.C. It has been listed on the District of Columbia Inventory of Historic Sites since 1985 and it was listed on the National Register of Historic Places in 1985. The house was designed by architect Thomas J.D. Fuller and completed in 1893. It is a contributing property in the Kalorama Triangle Historic District.
