= Embassy of the United States, Attard =

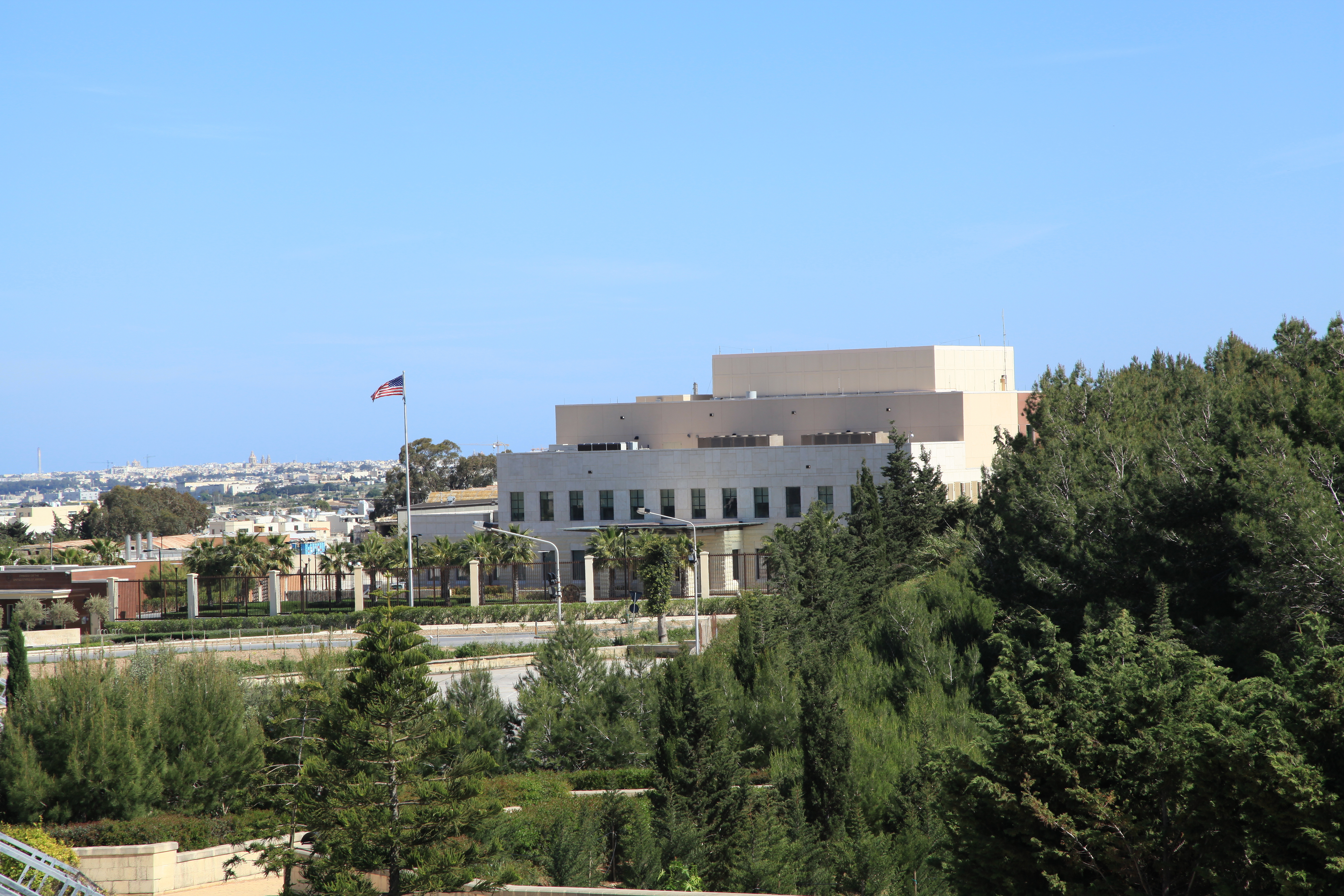
- Location: Attard, Malta
- Address: Ta' Qali National Park; Attard; ATD 4000
- Coordinates: 35°53′27.97″N 14°25′34.81″E
- Ambassador: Somers Farkas
- Website: mt.usembassy.gov

The Embassy of the United States of America in Malta (Maltese: L-Ambaxxata tal-Istati Uniti tal-Amerka) is the diplomatic mission of the United States of America to the Republic of Malta. The embassy building, opened in 2011, consists of a 10 acres (40,000 m^{2}) compound at Ta' Qali National Park in Attard, Malta.

Apart from the embassy building, there is also the official residence of the ambassador, at Villa Apap Bologna, also in Attard.

Somers Farkas serves as the United States ambassador to Malta since November 2025.

== History ==
The United States first established a consular presence in Malta in 1796, when the island was under the rule of the Order of St. John.

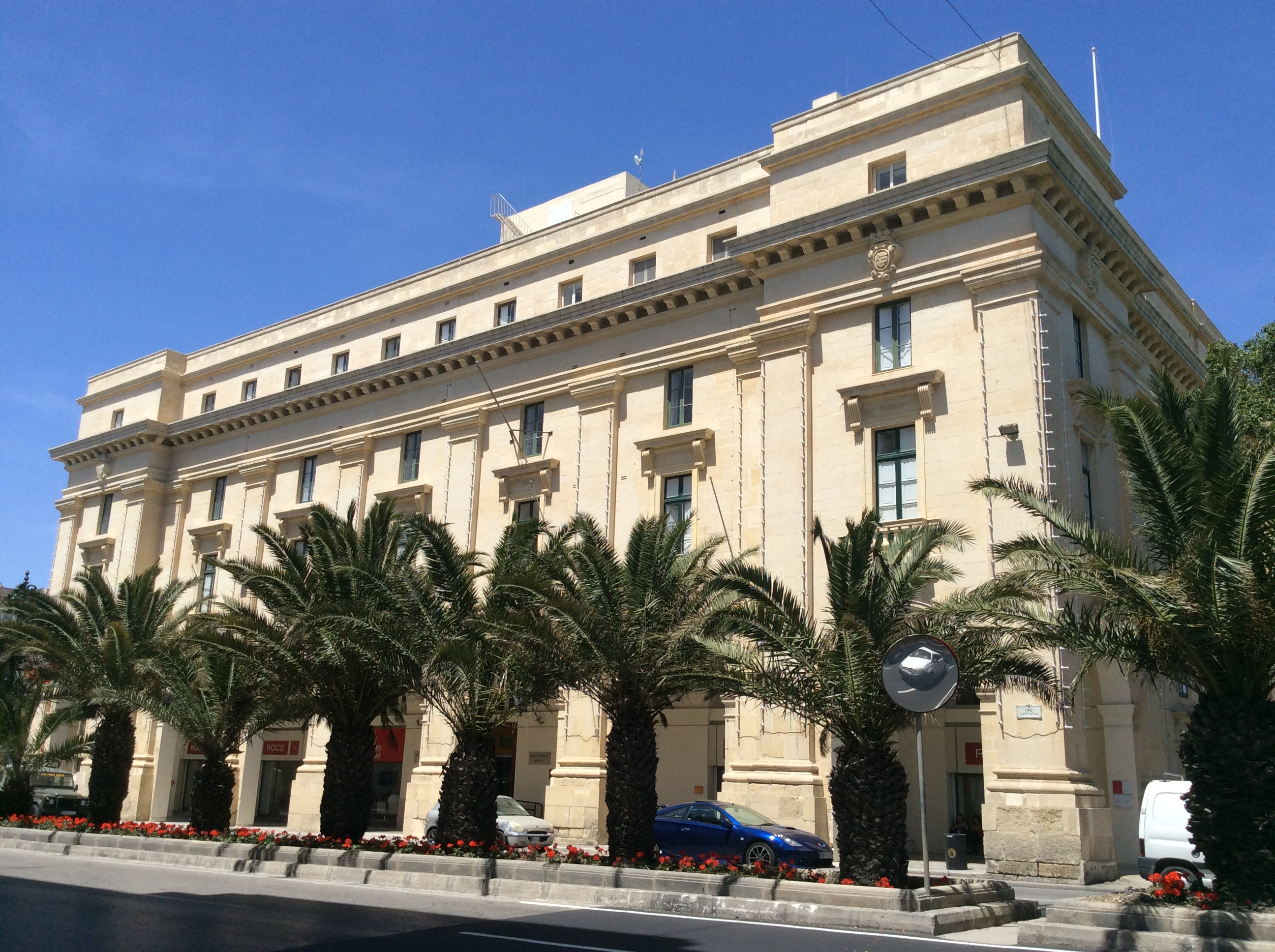
Development House in Floriana housed the U.S. Embassy from 1974 to 2011. It is now the offices of Malta's Treasury Department.

The Embassy of the United States in Malta was established upon Malta's independence from the United Kingdom on 21 September 1964. The embassy was originally located in the capital Valletta, but it eventually moved to Sliema. In the 1970s, it moved to Development House in St. Anne Street, Floriana. In 2011, the embassy was moved once again to a new building in Ta' Qali National Park in Attard. The embassy's website still lists its location as "Valletta".

The Floriana embassy closed on 1 July 2011, and the new building opened on 5 July 2011 and was officially inaugurated on 15 July. It was built on 10 acres (40,000 m^{2}) of land, on the site of the former election counting hall which was purchased from the Government of Malta in 2006 for €14.6 million. Construction cost €88.5 million, and more than 800 workers were involved in the works. The embassy moved in order to have a larger and better working environment, but also for security purposes. Local residents in Attard have complained of drainage problems coming from the American Embassy, which is a possible health problem in the area that adds to the flooding accumulation. The embassy is found next to an area designated as a commercial zone.

The embassy employs over 125 people, some American and some Maltese. The building includes an Information Resource Center, a conference room and a cultural center. It is certified as a LEED green building.

== See also ==
- Malta–United States relations
- List of ambassadors of the United States to Malta
- Embassy of Malta in Washington, D.C.
