= Kalorama Heights =

Neighborhood in Washington, D.C.

Coordinates: 38°54′57″N 77°03′06″W

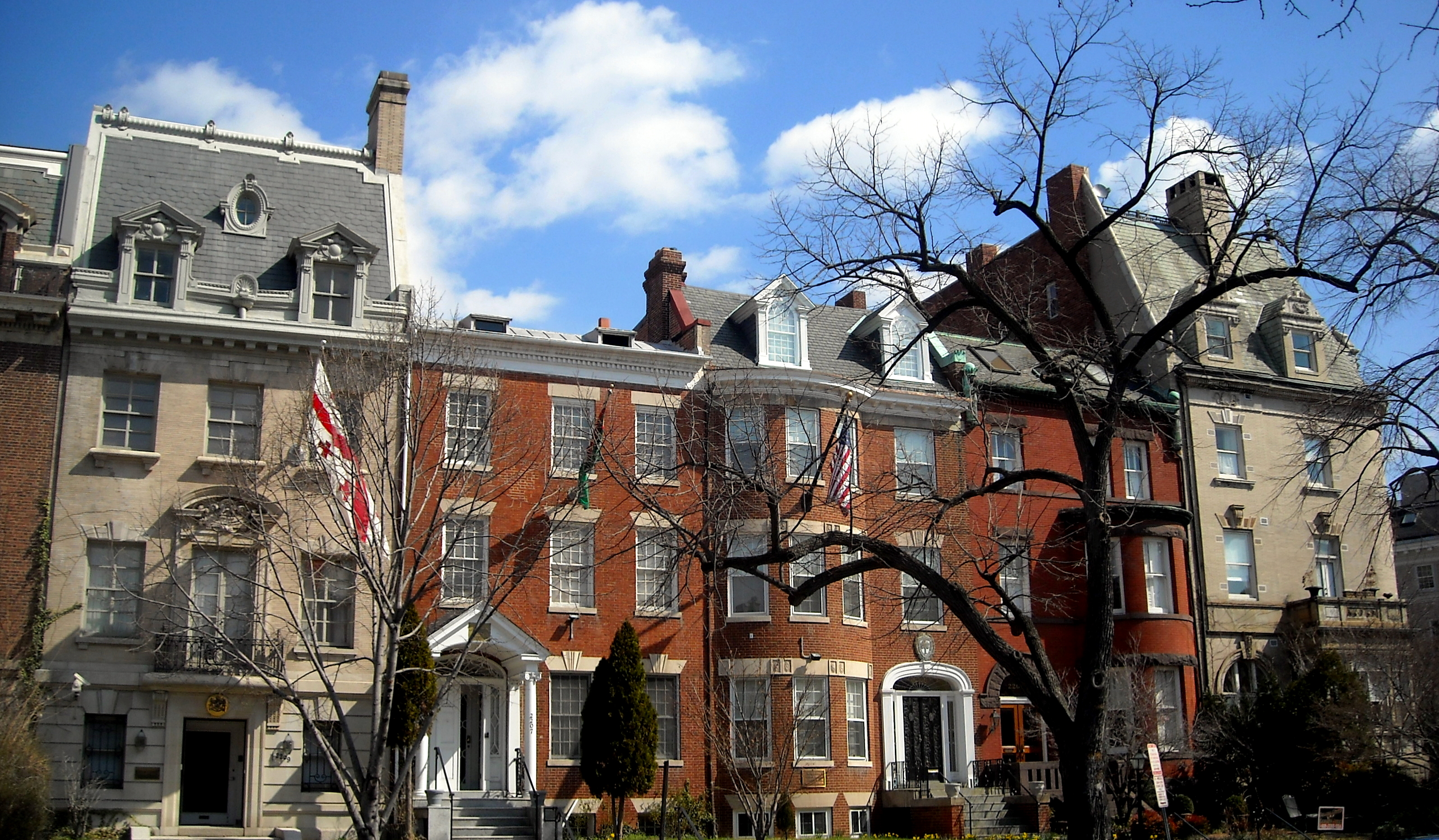

Kalorama Heights is a historic neighborhood in Northwest Washington, D.C. It is home to diplomats, power brokers, and wealthy political elites in D.C.

== Origin of name ==
The neighborhood takes its name from Joel Barlow's home in the area in the 1800s.

== Area ==
The neighborhood extends roughly from Massachusetts Avenue in the southwest to Calvert Street in the northeast, lying to the south of Rock Creek Park. The neighborhood is divided into two historic districts, separated by Connecticut Avenue:

- The Sheridan-Kalorama Historic District to the west and south of Connecticut Avenue, and
- the Kalorama Triangle Historic District to its north and east.

== Notable residents ==
- William Howard Taft
- Woodrow Wilson
- Franklin D. Roosevelt
- Warren G. Harding
- Herbert Hoover
- Tony Podesta
- Michelle Obama
- Barack Obama
- Ted Kennedy
- Rex Tillerson
- Jeff Bezos
- Justin B. Smith
- Chris Wallace
- James Wolfensohn
- Lyndon B. Johnson
