= Kalorama Park and Archeological Site =

- U.S. National Register of Historic Places
- U.S. Historic district – Contributing property
- D.C. Inventory of Historic Sites
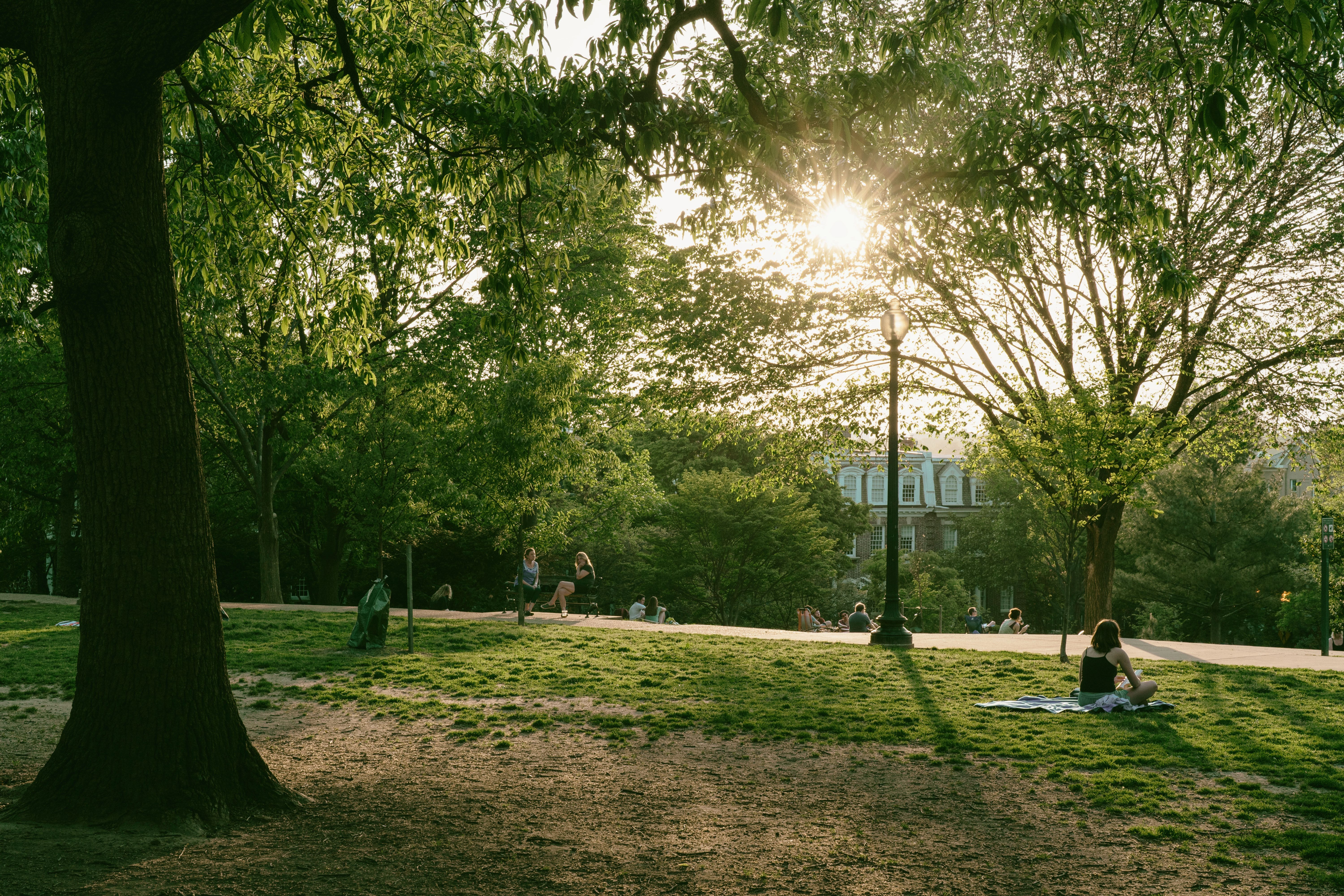
- Kalorama Park in 2023
- Location: 1875 Columbia Road NW, Washington, D.C., U.S.
- Coordinates: 38.920148°N 77.044793°W
- Built: 1836-1937 (period of significance)
- Part of: Kalorama Triangle Historic District (#87000627)
- NRHP reference No.: 16000193

Significant dates
- Added to NRHP: April 21, 2016
- Designated CP: May 4, 1987
- Designated DCIHS: September 23, 2010

The Kalorama Park and Archeological Site is a park and archeological site in the Kalorama Triangle neighborhood of northwest Washington, D.C., United States. Bounded by Kalorama Road, Columbia Road, 19th Street, and the rear property lines of buildings on Mintwood Place, the 3.17-acre (1.28 ha) triangular park includes roughly 2 acres (0.8 ha) that contains remnants of a 19th-century farm. The park includes a central lawn, a basketball court, playgrounds, a community garden, winding paths, and a field house.

The present-day park sits on land previously inhabited by the Nacotchtank tribe. Years later the Holmead family owned the land and sold it to the Hines brothers. Irish immigrant John Little purchased the property in the 1830s and established a farm. He built a large manor house in the 1850s which stood until 1937. Little owned over a dozen slaves, one of whom was Hortense Prout. She briefly escaped in 1861, possibly with help from people associated with the Underground Railroad, but was apprehended and returned to Little's custody. After slavery in the District of Columbia was abolished in 1862, Little continued operating his farm until his death. His daughters later sold portions of his farm to brewer and real estate investor Christian Heurich and lumber merchant Thomas W. Smith.

In the early 1900s, neighborhood residents formed a group, later named the Kalorama Citizens Association, to advocate for a park. A few decades later this finally came to fruition when the National Capital Planning Commission purchased the two properties previously owned by Heurich and Smith. The park was established in 1947 and named in honor of the citizens group. It is administered by the District of Columbia Department of Parks and Recreation. Due to archeological tests resulting in the discovery of remnants of the manor house along with household artifacts, the site was nominated for historic landmark status. The Kalorama Park and Archeological Site was added to the District of Columbia Inventory of Historic Sites in 2010 and National Register of Historic Places in 2016. Because of the site's connection with Prout's escape, the park is also included in the National Underground Railroad Network to Freedom.

== Description ==
Kalorama Park is a 3.17-acre (1.28 ha) roughly triangular plot of land at 1875 Columbia Road NW in the Kalorama Triangle neighborhood of northwest Washington, D.C. It is bounded by Kalorama Road on the south, Columbia Road on the east, the rear property lines of buildings on Mintwood Place on the north, and 19th Street on the west. The park is the topographical highest point of the surrounding area. The elevation of the park varies from 160 feet (48.8 m) to 182 foot (55.4 m), with the land sloping on the western and southern ends. In the city's planning system, the park is located on Square 2250, Lot 0818.

There are meandering paths throughout the park, two playground areas, picnic tables, a basketball court, a community garden, open lawns, a field house, and mature trees, some of which could date to the 18th-century. The main entrance to the park is on Columbia Road NW with a set of concrete stairs measuring 20-feet long (6.1 m). On either end of the stairs are 43-inch tall (109.2 cm) tonalite stone walls. On top of the walls are bluestone slabs measuring 32 inches (81.3 cm). The pathway from the main entrance to the central lawn area is made of red bricks. This rectangular central lawn, measuring approximately 100 feet long (30.4 m) and 70 feet wide (21.3 m), was previously the site of a manor house.

There are curved paths extending from the lawn on each side, some of which align with the driveway that once surrounded the manor house. These paths lead to entrances on 19th Street and Kalorama Road. The secondary entrance to the park is on 19th Street and is composed of a stairway varying in width from 8 to 10 feet (2.4 to 3.0 m). This stairway is also enclosed by tonalite stone walls and bluestone slabs. The third entrance is a concrete path leading from the corner of 19th Street and Kalorama Road. At this entrance is a wooden sign with the park's name.

The field house is a single-story brick building on the northwest portion of the park. There are two playground areas on the eastern portion of the park, one for small children and a second for older children. The community garden is south of these playgrounds and is surrounded by a locked gate and hedges. On the northwest corner of the park is the basketball court and is separated from 19th Street NW by a retaining wall. There are benches, two picnic tables, and 25 lamp posts throughout the park. The archeological site includes approximately 2 acres (0.8 ha) below the surface of the park where the manor house, outbuildings, and walls once stood. This portion is on the northern two-thirds of the park.

== History ==
=== Early site history ===
The area where present-day Kalorama Park is located was originally inhabited by Native American tribes, including the Nacotchtank. A patent in the Province of Maryland was issued in 1664 for a large tract of land which includes the park site. The Holmead family acquired a portion of this land in 1727, and it was later sold in 1828 to brothers Christian and Matthew Hines. The brothers attempted to raise silkworms on their 56.5-acre (22.9 ha) property by planting numerous mulberry trees but were unsuccessful and lost their land to foreclosure in 1836. Irish immigrant John Little (1805‐1876) purchased the property which had a commanding view of the developing city of Washington. At the time the property included a modest one-and-a-half story house the Hines brothers had built which burned down in the 1880s. The site where this house stood is now occupied by The Norwood on Columbia Road.

=== Little farm ===
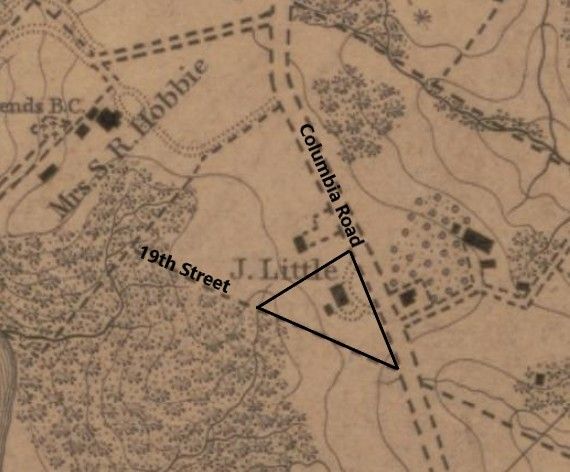
Topographic map from 1858 showing the John Little farm and manor house with the present-day Kalorama Park outlined

Little was a successful butcher and farmer. He operated a stand at Center Market and a slaughterhouse between present-day 18th and Champlain Streets where he dumped entrails that flowed down Slash Run toward Dupont Circle. He raised cattle east of Taylor Lane (Columbia Road) and built a house on the highest point of his property, present-day Kalorama Park. As his business flourished, Little expanded the operations of his farm and built a three-story Italianate-style manor house in the 1850s on the present-day park site. Here he raised five daughters with his wife while slaves were forced to perform duties on his property. The 1860 United States census shows Little owned thirteen slaves and by the following year he owned four additional slaves. He had also added a carriage house, outbuildings that may have been slaves' quarters, and a smaller house on the north side of the property where the Woodley Condominium now stands.

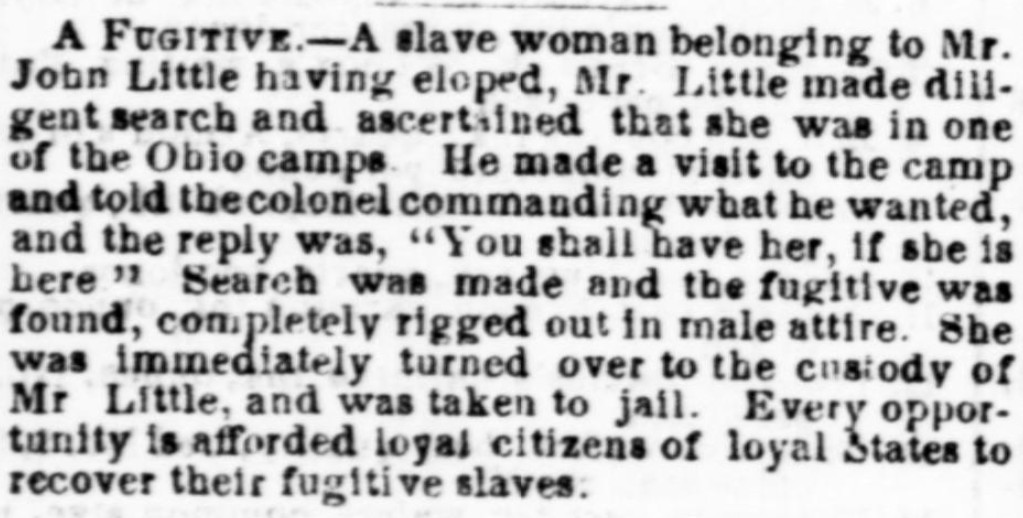
A newspaper article from June 17, 1861, discussing the escape and capture of Hortense Prout from John Little's farm.

One of the slaves Little owned was Hortense Prout, who was born into bondage to a mother Little had bought in 1839. When she was around 20 years old, Prout attempted to escape in June 1861 as the Civil War took place and Union troops were stationed throughout the city. She joined an Ohio troop camp, possibly as a cook, in the present-day Bloomingdale neighborhood but was soon apprehended. A newspaper article at the time reported on Prout's escape, noting she was "completely rigged out in male attire" and "immediately turned over to the custody of Mr. Little." It is believed Prout was assisted in her escape by people associated with the Underground Railroad. Little sent Prout to jail for ten days as punishment on June 15, 1861, after which she was returned to his farm.

After President Abraham Lincoln signed the District of Columbia Compensated Emancipation Act, which took effect on April 16, 1862, Prout and the other slaves owned by Little were freed. As part of the act, Little received money for his "lost property". He took the enslaved people to District of Columbia City Hall and they were valued by slave traders. Little attempted to receive $1,500 for Prout, who was described as a "healthy and industrious house servant", but was given $525.60. In total Little received $5,343.60 for his former slaves. It is unknown what happened to Prout after she was freed, but her mother continued working on the Little farm as a paid laborer. Little continued operating his farm with the assistance of hired laborers after his slaves were freed.

A few years after Little died in 1876, his daughters subdivided their shares of the property into nine lots and sold many of them to real estate developers. A portion of Little's farm comprises the Washington Heights Historic District. Lots 1-4 where the manor house stood were left undeveloped as some of the family members continued living there. By the early 1890s a streetcar line had been installed on Columbia Road, spurring residential development in the surrounding area. The manor house continued to be used by members of the Little family until the death of one of the daughters in 1901.

By 1903, the estate only covered the modern-day boundaries of Kalorama Park. The surviving daughters sold the northern portion, which included the manor house, to lumber merchant Thomas W. Smith. The southern portion of the estate was sold to brewer and real estate investor Christian Heurich who planned to build the city's largest apartment building on the site. After city government officials required Kalorama Road be connected, cutting through Heurich's property, the plans were cancelled. After Smith died in 1919, his wife rented the manor house to United States Court of Claims Judge Samuel Jordan Graham. Several years later the manor house became a boardinghouse but later sat abandoned. Heurich sold his portion of the former estate to Alonzo O. Bliss Properties in 1926.

=== Park history ===
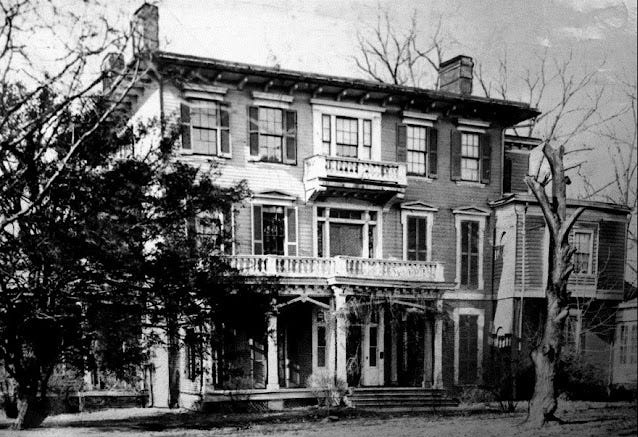
The Little manor house was razed in 1937, a few years before the park was established.

The first public park in Kalorama Triangle was the present-day Ann Hughes Hargrove Park, a small triangular lot between 19th Street, Columbia Road, and Kalorama Road, just south of the present-day Kalorama Park. Because of its small size, neighborhood residents wanted a larger space for children to play. The Washington Heights Citizens Association, later renamed the Kalorama Citizens Association (KCA), had been formed in 1906 for the purpose of establishing a neighborhood park, but it would take decades before a larger one was created.

By the early 1930s the National Capital Planning Commission (NCPC) wanted to purchase Heurich's property and turn it into a park. The manor house was demolished in 1937, spurring further calls from neighborhood residents for a community park. Two years later the NCPC requested $300,000 from the city government to purchase the land. In 1942, the NCPC paid $127,500 for the Smith property, and in 1946 paid $233,672.09 for the former Heurich property. In honor of the work neighborhood residents had undertaken to create the park, it was named Kalorama Park in honor of the KCA. In 1947, a site plan was developed for the park including construction of the basketball court, winding paths, playgrounds, and an open lawn. By 1949 these had been implemented along with construction of a small field house. When the field house and a flagpole were dedicated on August 12, 1949, those in attendance included Margaret Sands, a granddaughter of John Little who was born on the property.

Due to racial segregation policies at the time, the park was only available to white residents when it opened. The KCA voted on whether or not to desegregate the park, but the association president cast the deciding vote against doing so. Lawyer and civil rights activist Charles Hamilton Houston criticized the vote, writing in part: "I am bothered about the fact that white and colored athletes can play together on public athletic field and in areas controlled by the Department of the Interior without incident. Nevertheless, the [District of Columbia] Board of Recreation still feels it has to insist upon strict segregation in the same activities. Frankly it does not make sense."

Beginning in 1951 the District of Columbia Board of Recreation opened select parks and playgrounds to citizens of all races, only if the surrounding area was racially mixed and neighborhood residents did not object. Since the area around Kalorama Park was composed of only 25% black residents, the park remained segregated. After the U.S. Supreme Court ruled in the 1954 case Bolling v. Sharpe that schools in Washington, D.C. must be desegregated, all recreational facilities throughout the city were finally opened to all races, including Kalorama Park. In 1972, jurisdiction of the park was transferred from the National Park Service (NPS) to the District of Columbia Department of Parks and Recreation.

==== Archeological site and historic designation ====
In 1986 archeological investigations by Engineering-Sciences Inc. began in the park. Two portions of the manor house walls and remnants of a small structure were found. Among the items found in 41 shovel tests and 21 test units were 294 artifacts, including 19th-century porcelain, stoneware, whiteware, window glass, bottle glass, nails, and other metal objects. Portions of a concrete floor, believed to be a cellar, were also discovered. There was a recommendation the site be nominated for listing on the National Register of Historic Places (NRHP), but no action was taken at that time. During work undertake by Louis Berger Group Inc. in 2009, remains of a third and fourth structure were found, believed to be a carriage house or stable. Another archeological survey took place, resulting in a nomination for historic landmark status. It is possible there are additional building remains and household artifacts on the site. On September 23, 2010, the park and archeological site was added to the District of Columbia Inventory of Historic Sites as Kalorama Park Archeological Site 51NW061.

In 2008, the park was added to the NPS's National Underground Railroad Network to Freedom as "The Site of John Little's Manor House" With assistance from a $13,000 grant from the NPS and the Association for the Study of African American Life and History, a wayside marker was installed in 2018 to give information about Prout's escape. The park is also included in the Capital City Slavery Tour, noting all of the slaves that were once held captive on Little's farm. In 2014, the park was added to the city's African American Heritage Trail as the "Hortense Prout Freedom Seeker/John Little Farm Sit/Kalorama Park National Underground Railroad Network to Freedom Site". It was listed on the NRHP on Apri 21, 2016, as Kalorama Park and Archeological Site, and it is also a contributing property to the Kalorama Triangle Historic District.

== See also ==
- National Register of Historic Places listings in Washington, D.C.
