= Embassy of Malta, Washington, D.C. =

Embassy building

Embassy of Malta in the United States of America
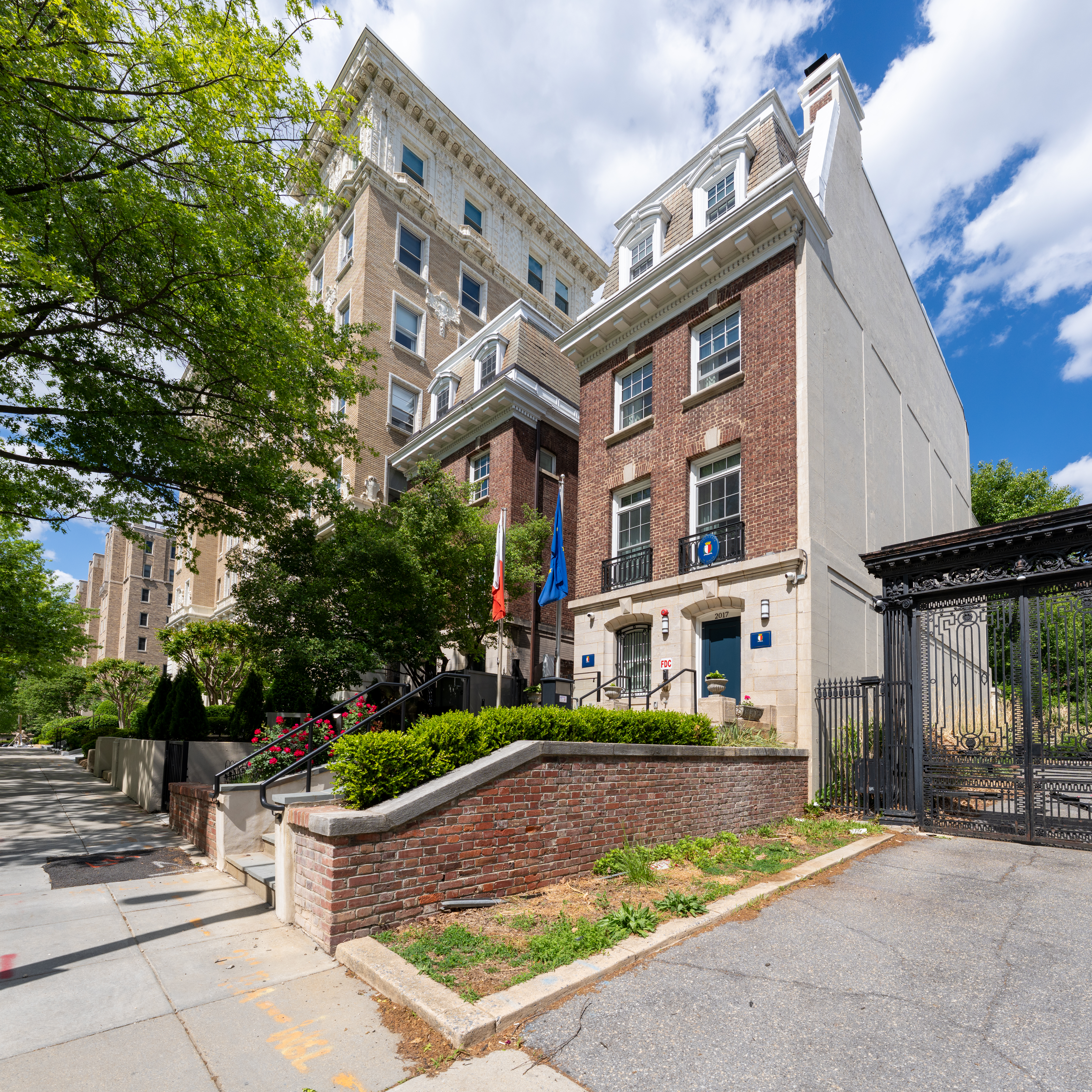
- Embassy of Malta to the US
- Location: Washington, D.C.
- Address: 2017 Connecticut Avenue, N.W.
- Coordinates: 38°55′1.93″N 77°2′49.05″W
- Opened: 1967
- Renovated: 2024
- Website: Official Website
- Wood-Deming House
- U.S. National Historic Landmark District – Contributing property
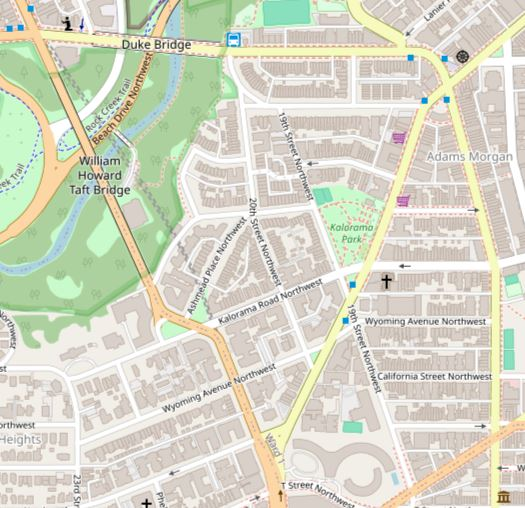
- Location: Washington, D.C.
- Built: 1903
- Architect: Waddy Butler Wood
- Architectural style: Colonial Revival
- Part of: Kalorama Triangle Historic District (ID87000627)

Significant dates
- Added to NRHP: May 4, 1987
- Designated NHLDCP: April 27, 1987

The Embassy of Malta in the United States of America, is the Republic of Malta's diplomatic mission to the United States. It is located at 2017 Connecticut Avenue, N.W. in Washington, D.C.'s Kalorama Triangle neighbourhood. The Embassy also serves as the High Commission of Malta to the Bahamas and the Embassy of Malta to Mexico. The embassy previously also served as the High Commission of Malta to Canada until 2024, when Malta established a resident high commission in Ottawa.

The current Ambassador is Godfrey Carmel Xuereb, the Deputy Chief of Mission is Jean Paul Gatt and the Consul is Petra Grech.

== Chancery ==
Built in 1903 to the designs of noted architect Waddy B. Wood, 2017 and 2019 Connecticut Avenue (historically known as the Wood-Deming Houses) are examples of Colonial Revival architecture.

The chancery is designated as a contributing property to the Kalorama Triangle Historic District, listed on the National Register of Historic Places in 1987.

== See also ==
- Embassy of the United States, Attard
