= Kalorama Triangle Historic District =

Historic district in Washington, D.C., United States

- U.S. National Register of Historic Places
- U.S. Historic district
- D.C. Inventory of Historic Sites
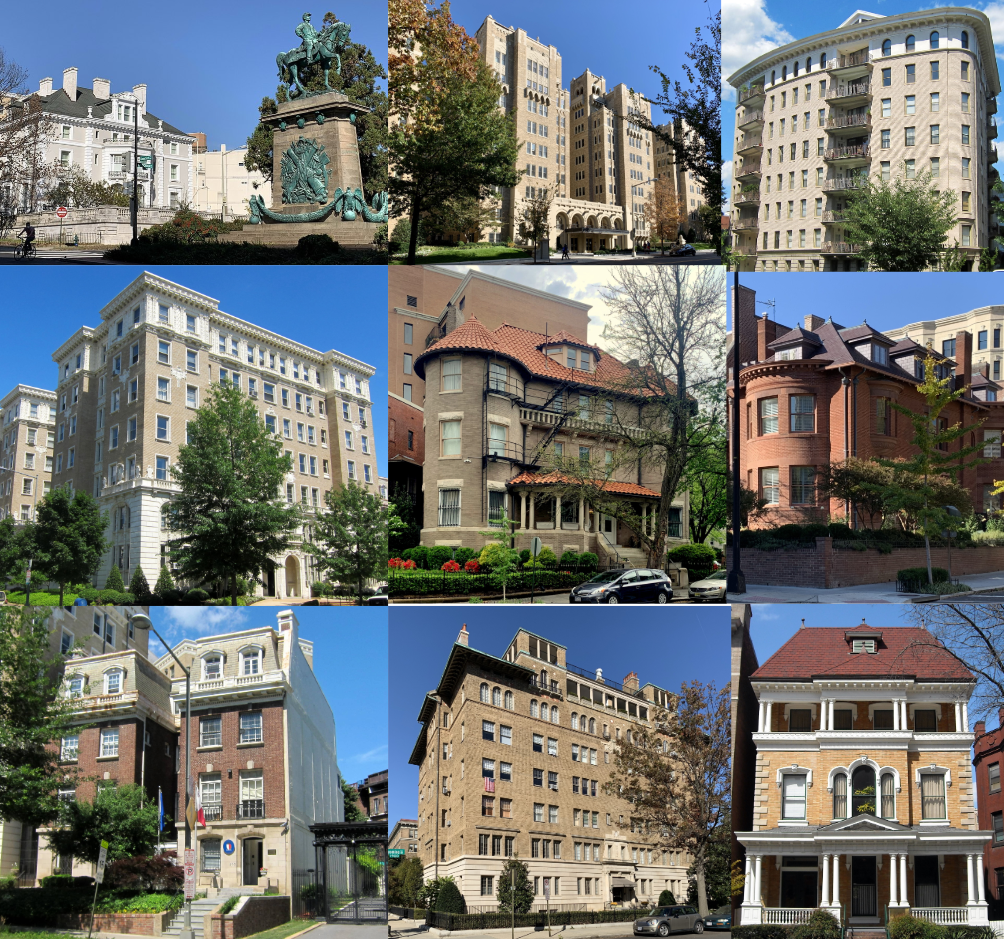
- (from left to right) Lothrop Mansion and George B. McClellan statue, 2101 Connecticut Avenue, The Carthage, 2029 Connecticut Avenue, Embassy of Gabon, 2200 20th Street NW, Embassy of Malta, The Altamont, 2009 Columbia Road NW
- Location: Roughly bounded by Connecticut Avenue NW, Columbia Road NW, and Calvert Street, NW; Washington, D.C.
- Coordinates: 38°55′14″N 77°2′47″W
- Area: 51 acres (21 ha)
- NRHP reference No.: 87000627

Significant dates
- Added to NRHP: May 4, 1987
- Designated DCIHS: April 27, 1987

The Kalorama Triangle Historic District is a mostly residential neighborhood and a historic district in the northwest quadrant of Washington, D.C. The entire Kalorama Triangle neighborhood was listed on the District of Columbia Inventory of Historic Sites (DCIHS) and National Register of Historic Places (NRHP) in 1987. In addition to individually listed landmarks in the neighborhood, the district is home to roughly 350 contributing properties. The neighborhood is roughly bounded by Connecticut Avenue to the west, Columbia Road to the east, and Calvert Street on the north.

The area was originally home to the Nacotchtank and Mattawoman tribes until the 17th century when tracts of land were granted by Charles II of England. Land was deeded and tracts split until the present-day neighborhood was a tract named Widow's Mite. The tract was renamed to Kalorama, which means "nice view" in Greek, in 1807. The tract included not only Kalorama Triangle, but the area now known as the Sheridan-Kalorama Historic District. The two neighborhoods were eventually divided by Connecticut Avenue, which runs north from Dupont Circle to Woodley Park via the Taft Bridge. The two neighborhoods are still sometimes referred to together as "Kalorama Heights". For many years Kalorama Triangle was only inhabited by a few families living in larger stand-alone houses.

When streetcars were installed on Connecticut Avenue and Columbia Road, development of the neighborhood grew rapidly. Although there were still stand-alone houses being constructed, most of the new housing consisted of rowhouses. There were also large, ornate apartment buildings constructed in the neighborhood, especially along Connecticut Avenue and Columbia Road. Within a few years, all of the lots had been developed and construction slowed down in the 1920s, when there was little land left to develop.

Historic preservationists worked with local officials to create the historic district, which was added to the DCIHS and NRHP in 1987. Before then, there were already three landmarks on the NRHP, including the Lothrop Mansion, the Fuller House, and the equestrian statue of George B. McClellan. The neighborhood is now considered a suburban-like oasis in a busy area of the city. The cohesiveness of the buildings, the quiet streets, the diversity of the population, and the easy access to restaurants and Washington Metro stations are the major factors for people living in the neighborhood.

== Geography ==
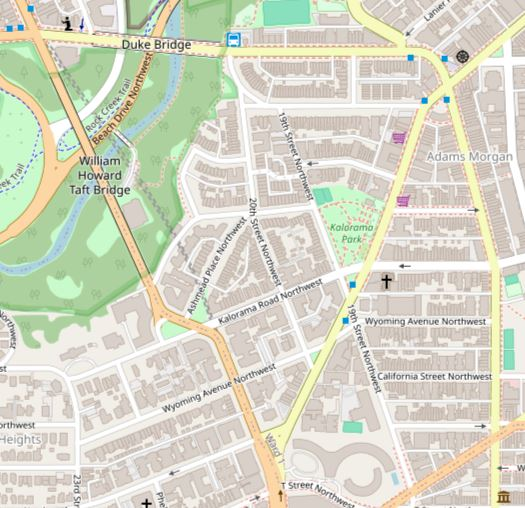
Map of the Kalorama Triangle neighborhood

Kalorama Triangle is a mostly residential neighborhood in Washington, D.C.'s northwest quadrant. The area of the neighborhood is approximately 51 acres (21 ha). The surrounding neighborhoods are Adams Morgan to the north and east, Dupont Circle to the south, and Sheridan-Kalorama to the west. Rock Creek Park is also one of the northern boundaries. The street boundaries are roughly Connecticut Avenue to the west, Columbia Road to the east, and Calvert Street on the north.

The area has been called Kalorama Triangle since the mid 20th-century. The name derives from the Kalorama estate that was once located in the area during the 19th century. The word, Kalorama, means "nice view" in Greek. The neighborhood is sometimes referred to as part of Adams Morgan or the larger Sheridan-Kalorama Historic District, located on the west side of Connecticut Avenue. Due to the geographic and street alignment, Kalorama Triangle developed into a neighborhood of its own.

The neighborhood is somewhat insulated by the surrounding commercial areas and features quiet, suburban-like streets in its interior. The western edge of the neighborhood is lined with grand apartment buildings until it reaches the Taft Bridge, which gives access to Woodley Park and other neighborhoods north of Rock Creek Park. The neighborhood features a few parks, including Kalorama Park, and three traffic island parks: Ann Hughes Hargrove Park; Biltmore Triangle Garden; and Major General George B. McClellan Park. Kalorama Park is 3 acres (1.2 ha) and located between 19th Street, Columbia Road, and the rear properties on Mintwood Place.

== History ==
=== 17th and 18th centuries ===
The land comprising modern-day Kalorama Triangle was originally inhabited by Native American tribes, including the Nacotchtank and Mattawoman. In the 1600s, Charles II of England gave one of his former servants an estate in modern day Washington, D.C. A portion of the 600-acre (240 ha) tract was later called Widow's Mite. Before the U.S. won its independence, Widow's Mite was included in Prince George's County, Maryland, beginning in 1696. When the surrounding area was planned as the nation's capital in 1790, the land was included in Washington County, D.C. There was a manor house called Belair that was built in 1795 on the former Widow's Mite estate. This estate included the modern-day Kalorama Triangle and Sheridan-Kalorama neighborhoods. The name of the estate was changed by owner Joel Barlow to Kalorama in 1807 and remained so until the 1880s when the estate was sold and subdivided into different lots.

=== 19th century ===
==== Early estates ====
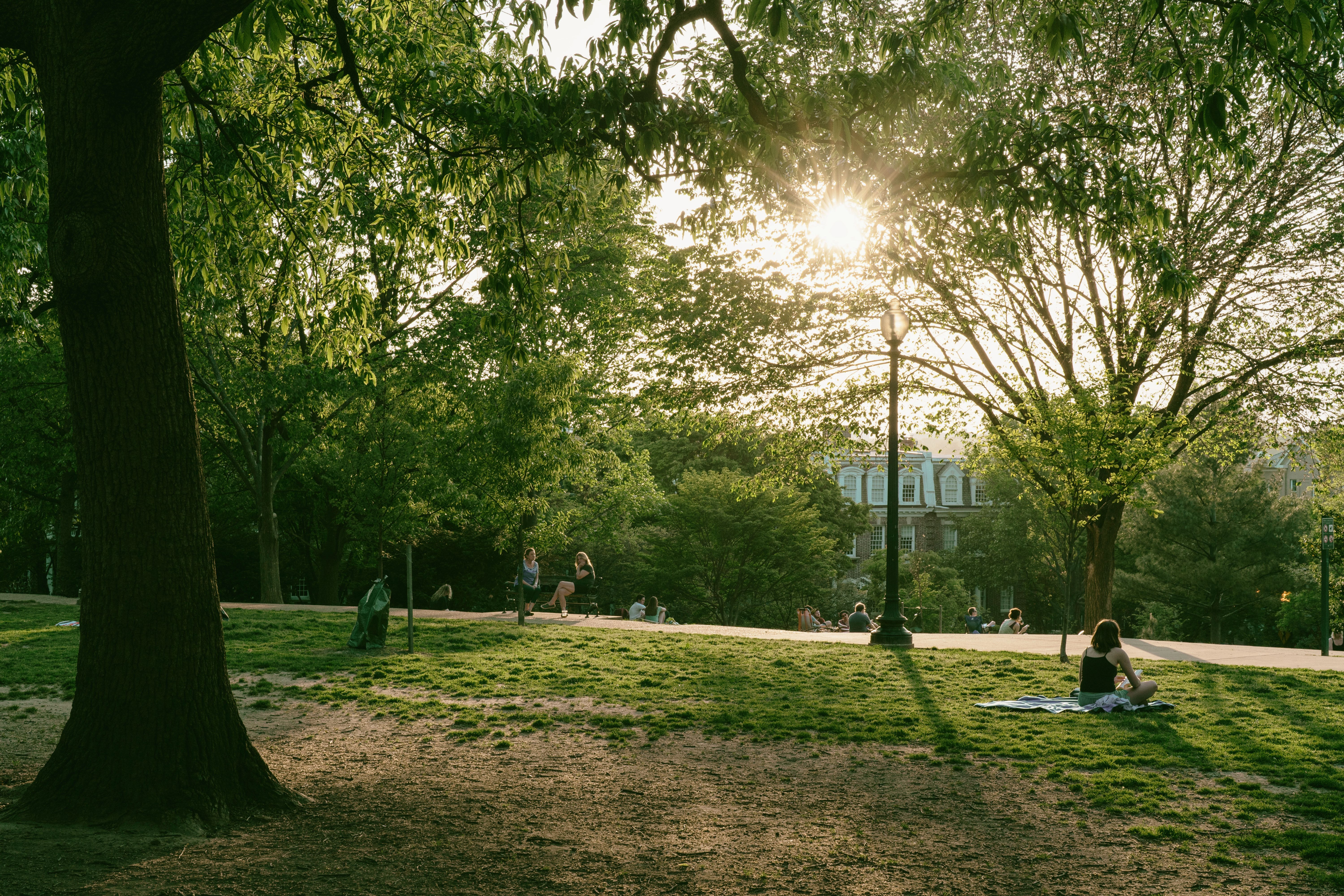
Kalorama Park is where John Little's estate was.

The first house built in modern-day Kalorama Triangle was Cliffbourne, where Cliffbourne Street is now located, between Biltmore and Calvert Streets. There was a winding road off Columbia Road, then called Taylor Lane, to reach the Cliffbourne estate. The site was owned or leased by several people in the 19th century, including Colonel George Bomford and U.S. Representative Selah R. Hobbie. William Thornton wanted land in Kalorama Triangle and around 34 acres (14 ha) was deeded to him in 1817. He never lived on the property, and after his death, his widow sold the lot to brothers Christian and Matthew Hines. They built a modest-sized home, but after making poor financial investments, they defaulted on the land's mortgage payments.

The next owner was John Little, whose large house once stood where Kalorama Park is now. Due to the growing size of his family, and the success of his businesses, Little kept expanding his estate. By the early 1860s, Little had the large house, a carriage house, a smaller house, and several industrial buildings on his estate. Little and his relatives owned 17 enslaved people. One of them, Hortense Prout, attempted to flee in 1861, but was caught and put in jail; the Kalorama Park and Archeological Site is consequently a historic landmark and included in the National Underground Railroad Network. The following year, the people enslaved by the Littles were freed through legislative actions by Senator Henry Wilson and President Abraham Lincoln.

During the Civil War, a large influx of soldiers arrived to the city and its outlying areas. The Cliffbourne estate was commandeered and used as a cavalry barracks. The barracks became a large hospital for the Veteran Reserve Corps and captive Confederate Army soldiers in 1862. One civilian who made frequent visits to the hospital was Walt Whitman, sitting with and talking to wounded soldiers. When Little died in 1876, his reported $1 million estate was left to his five daughters, including valuable land they later sold. In the last few decades of the 19th century, Representative John B. Alley and Senator Lyman R. Casey owned the Cliffbourne estate. The last owner, inventor Marion C. Stone, died in 1899, the same year the Cliffbourne house was demolished.

==== Beginning of development ====
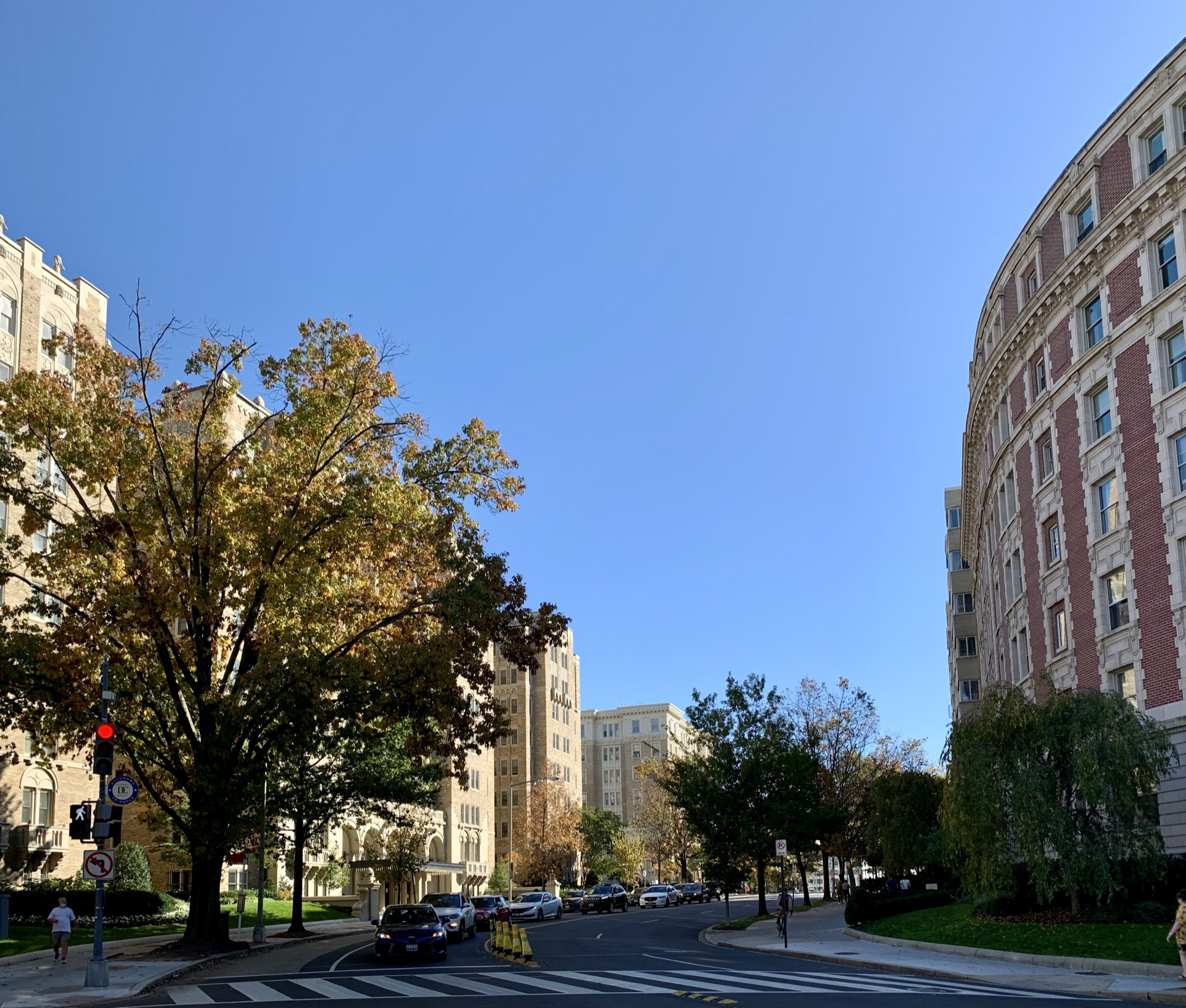
Connecticut Avenue is the western border of the neighborhood and historic district. Kalorama Triangle is on the left and the Sheridan-Kalorama Historic District is on the right.

When the District of Columbia Organic Act of 1871 came into law, it extended the boundaries of the City of Washington to the present District of Columbia. Florida Avenue, originally known as Boundary Street, was just a few blocks south of Kalorama Triangle. Once the roads were improved, sewer lines installed, and lots plotted in the 1870s and 1880s, there was an increase in the neighborhood's development. Construction of a new Woodley Lane Bridge over Rock Creek along with extending Connecticut Avenue northward spurred further interest in Kalorama Triangle. Another development was creation of the Rock Creek Railway, which built a bridge crossing Rock Creek Park, and later merged with the Washington and Georgetown Railroad in 1895 to form the Capital Traction Company.

Despite the new bridge and widening of Columbia Road, real estate development was somewhat slow in Kalorama Triangle until the 1890s. This was due in part to the Panic of 1893 and Highway Act of 1893, which required L'Enfant Plan street layouts to be followed in the former Washington County. After an exemption for existing neighborhoods began in 1898, development occurred quickly in Kalorama Triangle. Installation of streetcar lines built along Connecticut Avenue and Columbia Road also spurred development.

Around the turn of the century, Kalorama Triangle featured numerous large free-standing houses, including Managannsett, which stood at the intersection of Columbia Road and Wyoming Avenue. The residential character of the neighborhood soon changed, with rowhouses becoming predominant. Some of the earliest homes of this type were built on 19th Street, Biltmore Street, Calvert Street, Columbia Road, Kalorama Road, and Mintwood Place. There were still free-standing houses built during this time, including the Fuller House on Ashmead Place.

=== 20th century ===
==== Further development ====
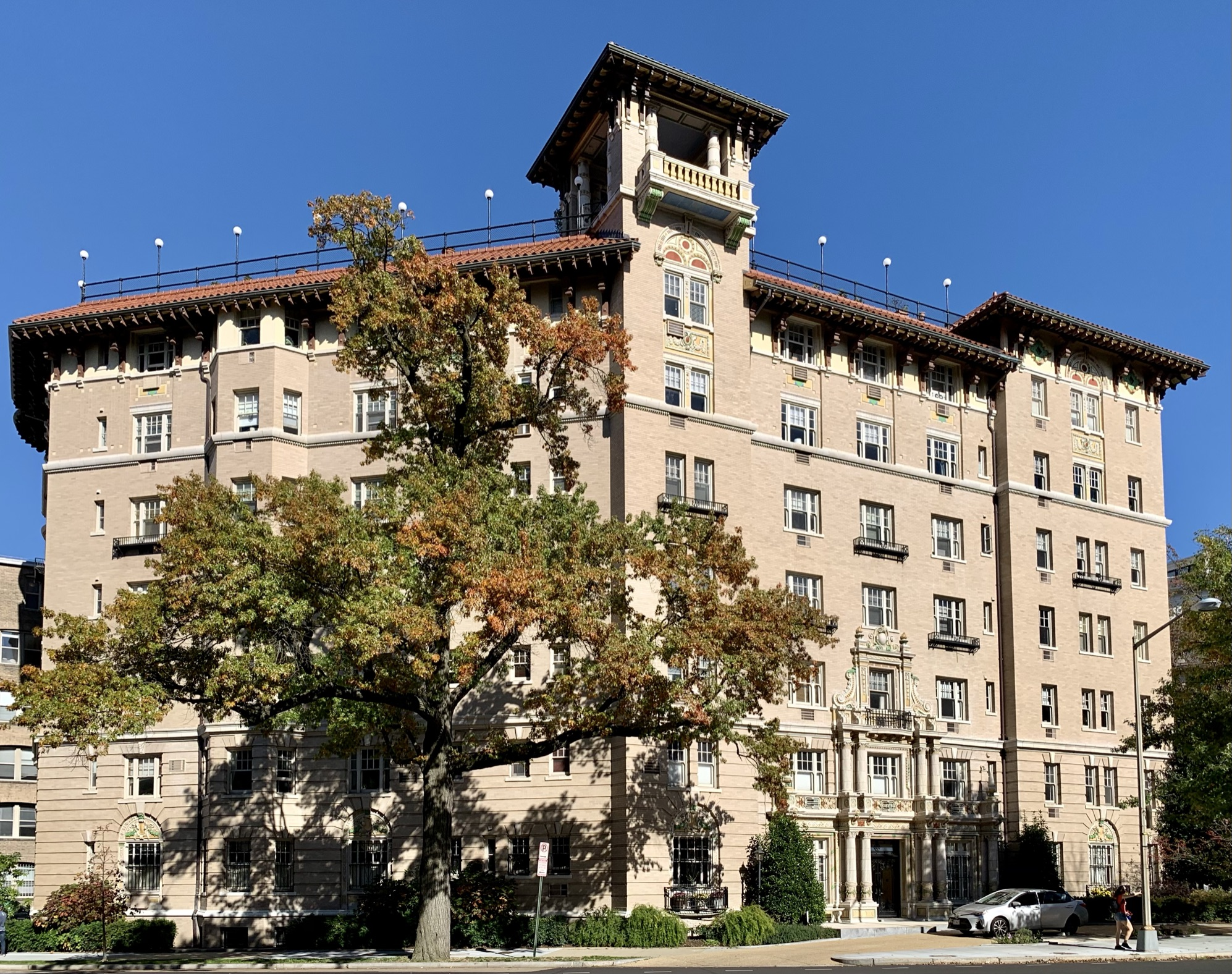
The Woodward at 2311 Connecticut Avenue is one of many apartment buildings constructed in the neighborhood in the early 20th century.

The Taft Bridge, allowing Connecticut Avenue to cross Rock Creek Park, was the world's largest concrete bridge when completed. It led to further development in Kalorama Triangle and neighborhoods north of the bridge. By the first few years in the 1900s, all remaining lots had been subdivided. With the widening and northward placement of Connecticut Avenue, the two Kalorama neighborhoods became distinct, with affluent residents building homes in Sheridan-Kalorama, and mostly middle-class residents living in Kalorama Triangle.

The predominant architectural style for the homes built in the late 19th century was Romanesque Revival, but in the early 20th century, Georgian Revival was the more popular style. American Craftsman was also a common style during this period. Most of the homes built in the early 20th century were rowhouses, including over 100 built between 1902 and 1905. A house and statue completed in the 1900s formed the southern boundary of the neighborhood. The Beaux-Arts style Lothrop Mansion was constructed in 1908 and replaced an earlier house. The other southern boundary marker of the neighborhood is the equestrian statue of George B. McClellan, which was erected in 1907.

Some of the earlier houses built in the neighborhood were replaced with large, decorative apartment buildings in the 1900s to 1920s. The Mendota, on 20th Street, was the first to be constructed in the neighborhood. It is one of 25 apartment buildings constructed in Kalorama Triangle between 1901 and 1927, mostly along Connecticut Avenue and Columbia Road due to access to streetcar lines. Some of the apartment buildings were luxurious and designed by the city's noted architects. Large apartment buildings including The Altamont (built by George Truesdell), 2029 Connecticut Avenue, 2101 Connecticut Avenue, 2301 Connecticut Avenue, and The Woodward at 2311 Connecticut Avenue, were built along the neighborhood's major routes and catered to the upper middle class. During the 1930s, the Calvert Street Bridge, later renamed the Duke Ellington Bridge, replaced an older one that carried Calvert Street west over Rock Creek Park, giving access to Woodley Park and other neighborhoods further north and west.

There were mostly small commercial properties built along Columbia Road and Calvert Street during the 1930s, which were the last undeveloped lots in the Kalorama Triangle. Because of the somewhat rapid development of the neighborhood, the size and architectural styles used created a cohesive appearance. Many of the developers and architects that designed houses and apartment buildings in the neighborhood were prominent in their professions, including Arthur B. Heaton, Harry Wardman, B. Stanley Simmons, Hornblower & Marshall, James G. Hill, Appleton P. Clark Jr., and Thomas Franklin Schneider.

==== Historic preservation ====
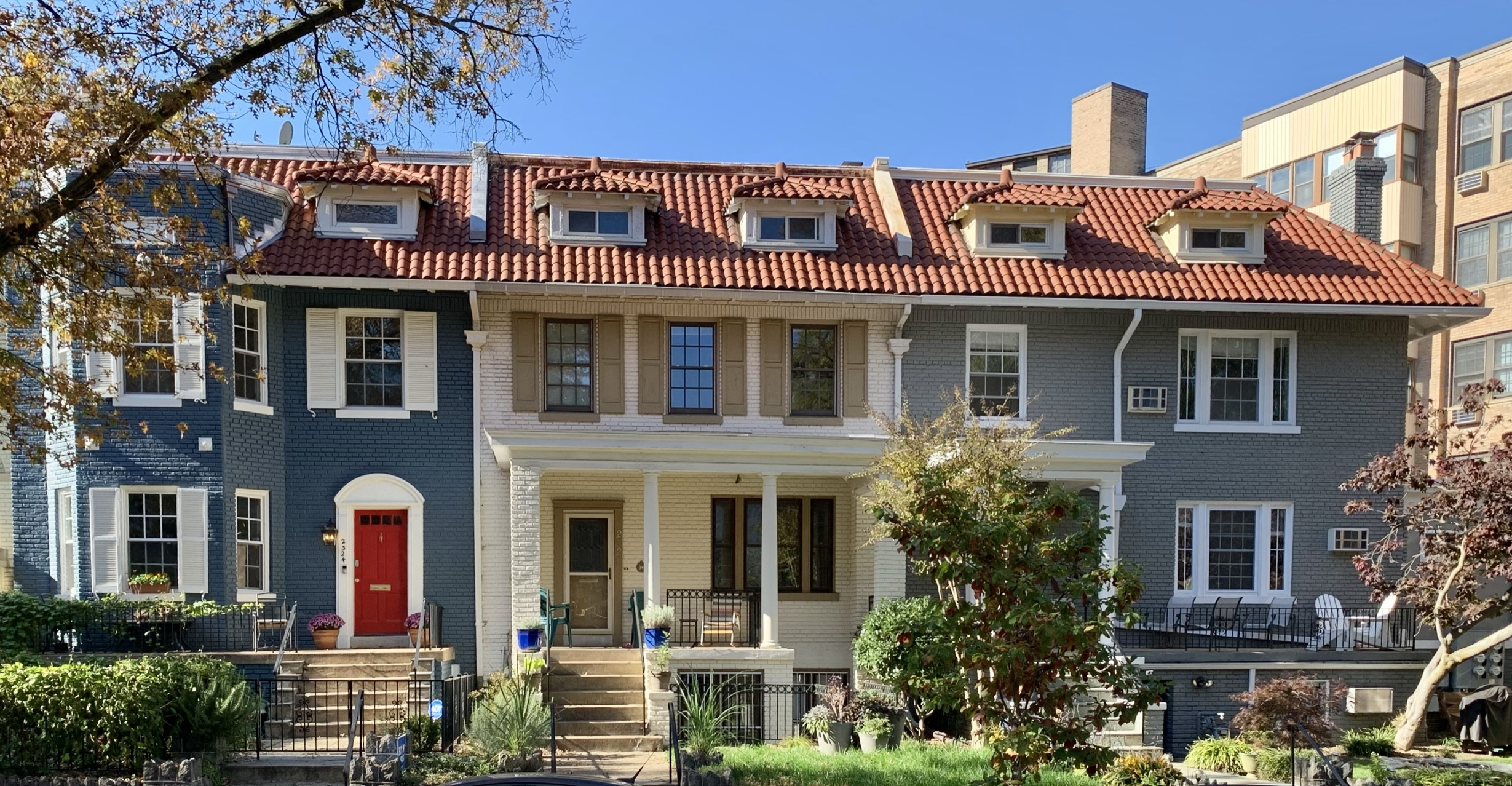
Rowhouses line many of the neighborhood streets. These on Ashmead Place are contributing properties to the historic district.

There were a few new buildings constructed in the neighborhood during the late 20th century, including rowhouses that were demolished and replaced with modern buildings. To stop further demolition in the neighborhood, historic preservationists worked with local officials to create the Kalorama Triangle Historic District, which was listed on the District of Columbia Inventory of Historic Sites (DCIHS) on April 27, 1987, and the National Register of Historic Places (NRHP) on May 4, 1987. Additional buildings and sites added to the DCIHS and NRHP include the Fuller House, the Lothrop Mansion, the Kalorama Park and Archeological District, and the statue of George B. McClellan. The Woodward at 2311 Connecticut Avenue was listed on the DCIHS in 1964.

Additional buildings in the historic district that are some of the 352 contributing properties include The Mendota (1901), The Woodley (1903), The Baltimore (1905), The Cliffbourne (1905), The Sterling (1905), The Knickerbocker (1909), The Airy View (1910), The Beacon (1910), The Biltmore (1913), The Altamont (1915), 2029 Connecticut Avenue (1915), The Carthage (1919), Park Crest (1922), The Melwood (1926), The Valley Vista (1927), 2101 Connecticut Avenue (1927), and The Mintwood (1929) Buildings that are not designated contributing properties include 36 buildings and one site. Examples include the parking lot behind 2005 Wyoming Avenue, 2012 Wyoming Avenue (1980s), 2027 Kalorama Road (1970s), 1925 Belmont Road (1960s), 2411 20th Street (1970s), 1809-1855 Biltmore Street (1970s), and 1945-1957 Calvert Street (1970s).

=== 21st century ===
An article in The Washington Post described Kalorama Triangle as a village within the city with an "old world vibe". The mixture of historic buildings, quiet streets, easy access to area restaurants and grocery stores, and diversity of its population has drawn in residents for decades. That several of the large apartment and co-op buildings have terraces overlooking the city has been a major selling point. The houses in the area are priced over $1 million, while the condominiums and co-ops can be even higher, depending on the building.

There is a Kalorama Citizens Association which helps maintain the neighborhood's parks, including Kalorama Park, where a community garden is located. The Association planted new trees and installed park benches to attract visitors to the park. Another article in The Washington Post described the neighborhood as a "nook of serenity tucked into a bustling city". Short distances to nearby Washington Metro stations are also mentioned as a perk of living in the neighborhood.

== See also ==
- National Register of Historic Places listings in Washington, D.C.
- Neighborhoods in Washington, D.C.
