= Ta' Qali =

Town in Malta

Coordinates: 35°53′41.22″N 14°24′54.62″E

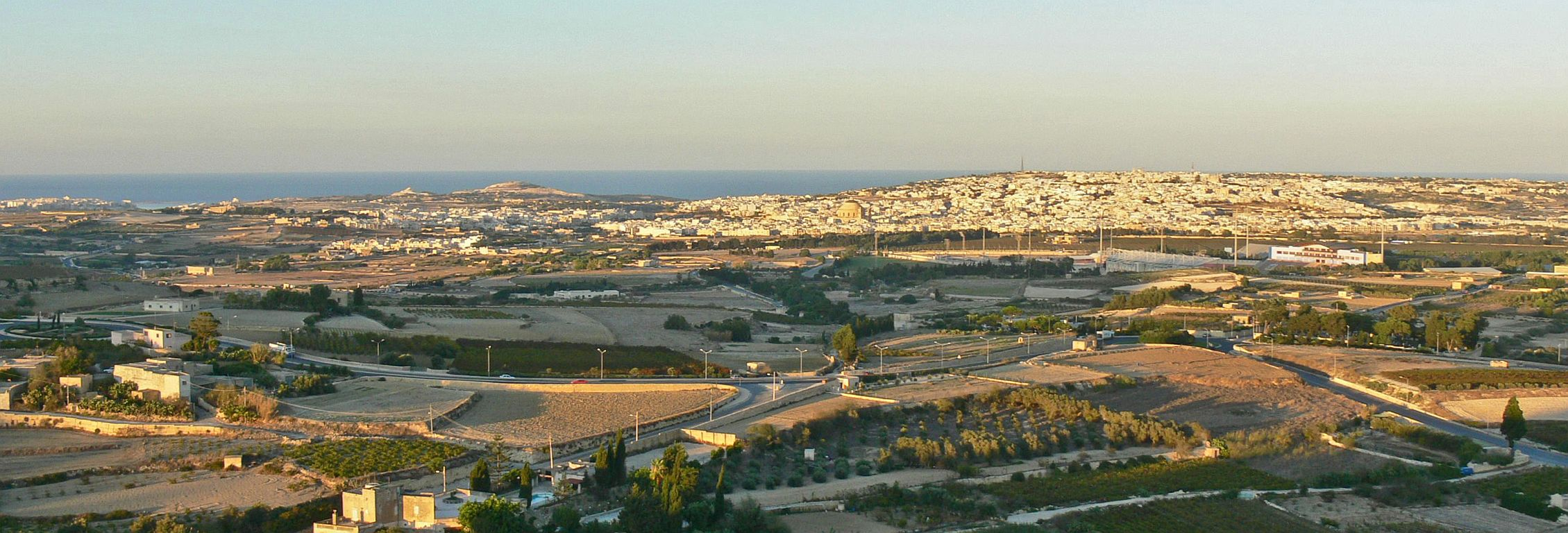
View of Ta' Qali from Mdina

Ta' Qali is a wide open space in the limits of Attard and Mosta in central and northern Malta respectively, which contains the national football stadium, the Malta Fairs & Conventions Centre, Ta' Qali National Park, a crafts village, and a national vegetable market which is locally known as the Pitkalija.

== History ==
Shortly before World War II, the area was used to build a military aerodrome and a station for the Royal Air Force (RAF), which the British called RAF Ta Kali; Maltese place names were often corrupted in this fashion. RAF Ta Kali was operational throughout the war and continued to be used as an RAF airfield until the mid-1950s. Later, RAF squadrons based in the United Kingdom visited Ta Kali as part of their annual proficiency training.

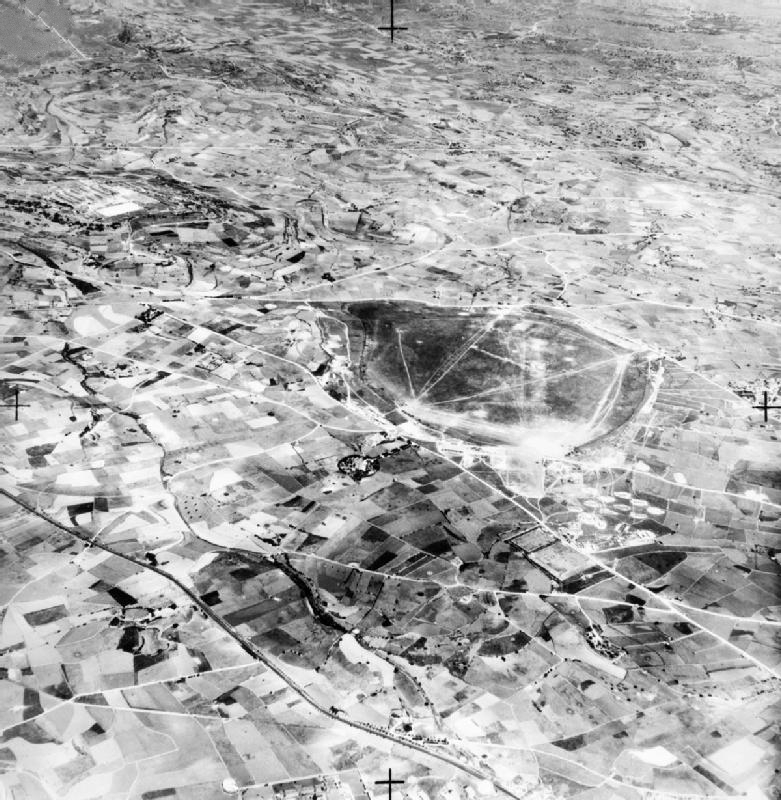
RAF Ta Kali in 1941.

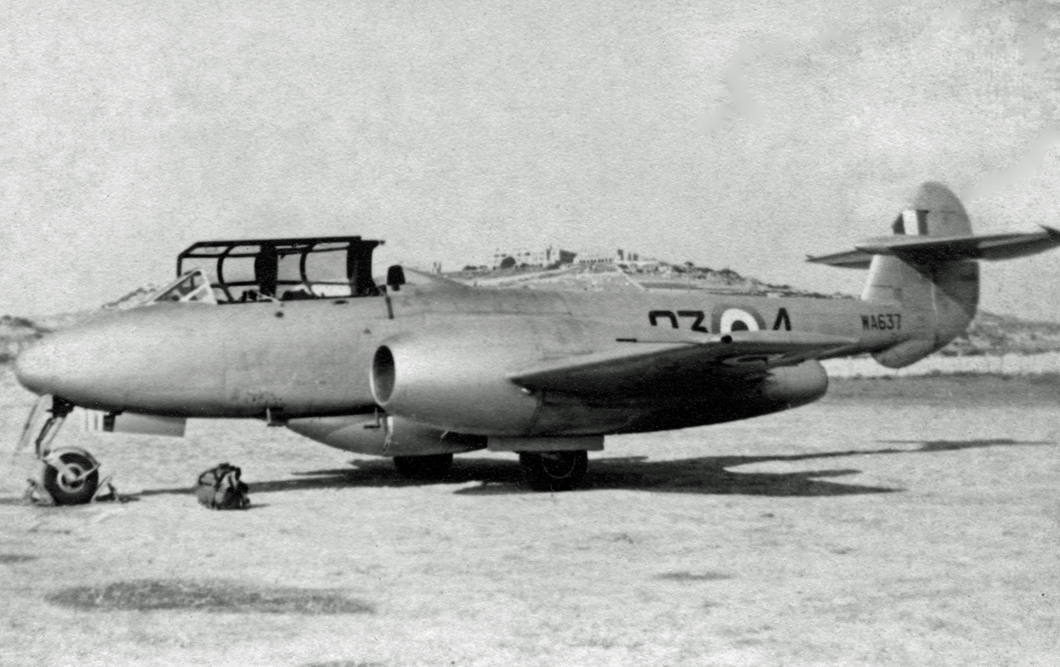
RAF Gloster Meteor T.7 jet trainer at RAF Ta Kali in 1952. The nearby hill top town of Mtarfa is in the background

Since the departure of the RAF and the closure of the air base, the location has been transformed into a recreational area. The area is small in scale but considered by some in Malta as an ideal place to go for a picnic and spend weekend afternoons. The National Park also includes an amphitheatre. A number of international concerts have been staged at the park.

The US Embassy stands across from the Ta'Qali National Park. In July, 2011 the embassy relocated to Ta'Qali from Floriana where it stood for nearly fifty years.

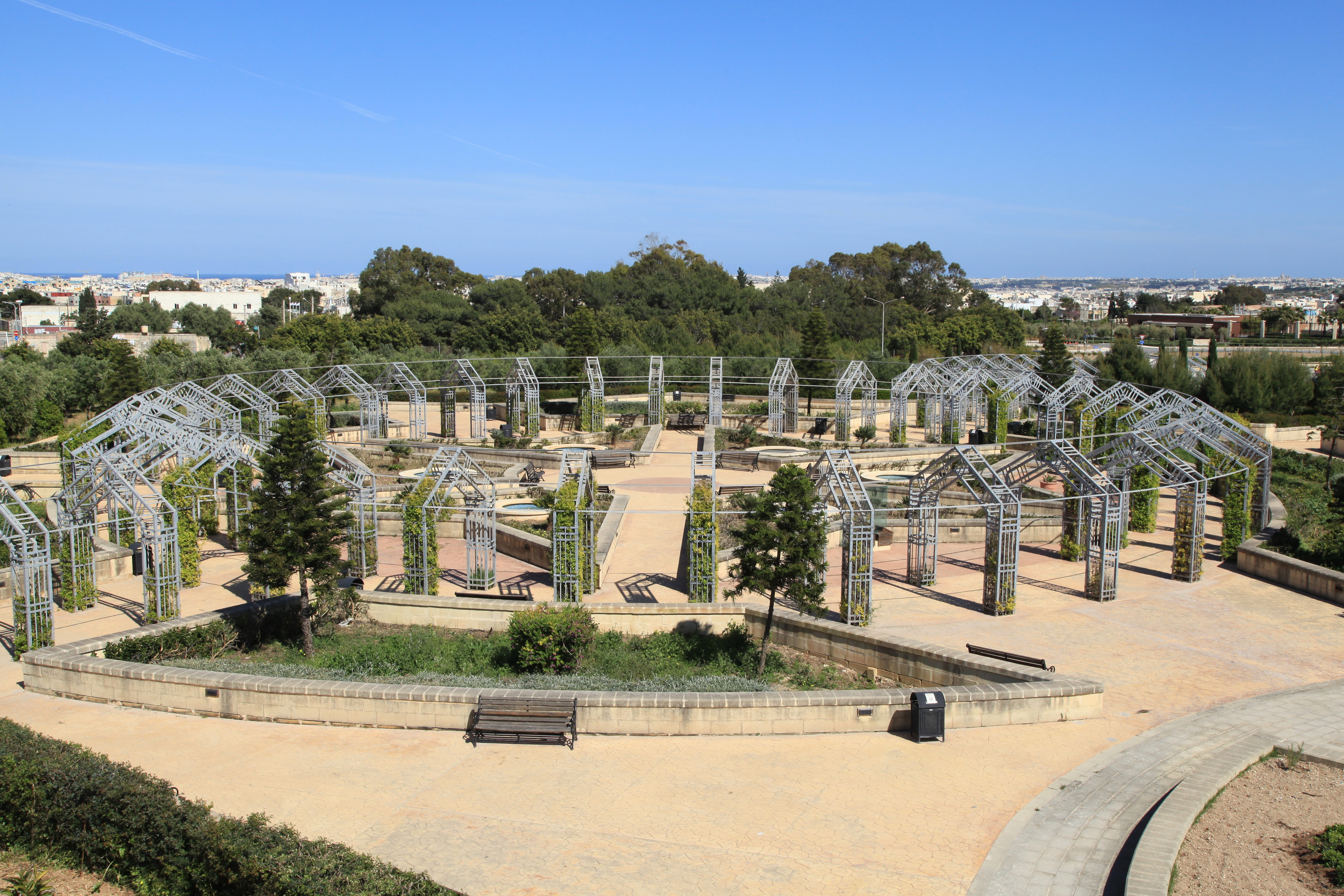
The national park before renovations, pictured in 2014

Ta' Qali still fulfils part of its former role as an airfield but the only aircraft that take off from the greatly diminished landing strip are scale models, whose owners make part of a club located in Ta' Qali. Today, many of the military huts and buildings have been converted into workshops where Maltese craftsmen produce their handiwork, and the Ta' Qali Crafts Village has become an important tourist attraction. There is also the Malta Aviation Museum, which has different aircraft related to Maltese aviation history. Before being converted into a recreational park the airstrip was used in the first car races ever held by the Maltese; nowadays the Sport Muturi has its off-road tracks where the annual motorsport championship is held.

13 Hours: The Secret Soldiers of Benghazi is a 2016 American biographical war movie filmed in Malta and Morocco, for which a large film set was built during 2015 in Ta' Qali. The film follows the 2012 Benghazi attack, in which Islamic militants attacked a U.S. diplomatic compound in Libya.

== Ta'Qali Artisan Village or Crafts Village ==
The Ta' Qali Crafts Village is a tourist attraction in Ta' Qali, Malta. Cultural and traditional artefacts are made and sold within the village. As of 2019, refurbishments have taken place that have led to the upgrading of the premises from the nissen huts used in the British airfield, RAF Ta Kali, that was built near the village to larger traditional Maltese buildings. The renovations came in at around 13 million euros. The crafts village is also the location of the annual festa lwien.

== Concerts ==
List of concerts at Ta'Qali
| Date | Artist | Tour | Tickets | Gross |
|---|---|---|---|---|
| 6 June 2023 | Celine Dion | Courage World Tour | —N/a | —N/a |
| 19 October 2024 | Take That | This Life on Tour | —N/a | —N/a |
| 20 October 2024 | Take That | This Life on Tour | —N/a | —N/a |
