= List of African-American historic places in Washington, D.C. =

This list of African American Historic Places in Washington, D.C., is based on a book by the National Park Service, The Preservation Press, the National Trust for Historic Preservation, and the National Conference of State Historic Preservation Officers.

Contents: Districts in Washington, D.C. with African American Historic Places
Northwest - Northeast - Southeast - Southwest

Some of these sites are on the National Register of Historic Places (NR) as independent sites or as part of larger historic district. Several of the sites are National Historic Landmarks (NRL). Others have Washington, D.C., historical markers (HM). The citation on historical markers is given in the reference. The location listed is the nearest community to the site. More precise locations are given in the reference.

== Northwest ==
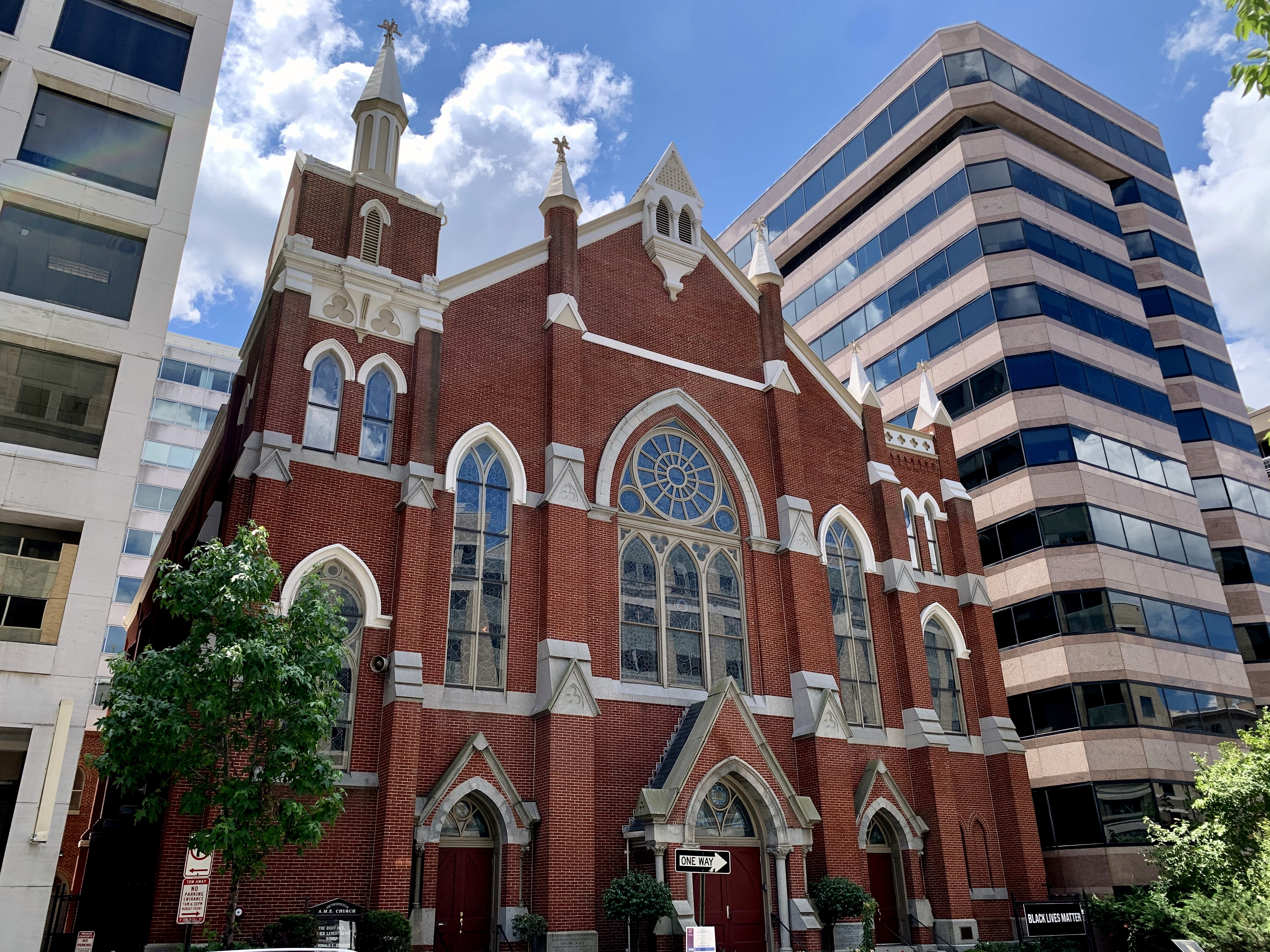
The Metropolitan African Methodist Episcopal Church (founded in 1838; known as "the National Cathedral of African Methodism") located at 1518 M Street, NW in Downtown Washington, D.C.

- Andrew Rankin Memorial Chapel, Frederick Douglass Memorial Hall, Founders Library
- Asbury United Methodist Church
- Banneker Recreation Center
- Brightwood
  - Military Road School
- Carter G. Woodson House
- Charles Sumner School
- Charlotte Forten Grimké House
- Columbia Heights
  - Francis L. Cardozo Senior High School
- Downtown
  - Freedman's Bank Building
  - Metropolitan African Methodist Episcopal Church
- Dupont Circle
  - Strivers' Section Historic District
- Foggy Bottom
  - St. Mary's Episcopal Church
- Georgetown
  - Mount Zion Cemetery
  - Mount Zion United Methodist Church
- Howard Theatre
- Howard University
  - Howard University Hospital
- LeDroit Park
  - Historic District
  - Mary Church Terrell House
- Lincoln Theatre
- Mary McLeod Bethune Council House National Historic Site
- Miner Normal School
- Mount Vernon Square/Convention Center
  - Blanche K. Bruce House
- Shaw
  - Blagden Alley-Naylor Court Historic District
  - Frelinghuysen University, Former Classroom Building
  - Lincoln Temple United Church of Christ
  - Mary Ann Shadd Cary House
  - Prince Hall Masonic Temple
  - St. Luke's Episcopal Church
  - Shaw Junior High School
  - Southern Aid Society-Dunbar Theater Building
  - True Reformer Building
  - Twelfth Street YMCA Building
- Truxton Circle
  - John Fox Slater Elementary School
  - John Mercer Langston School
  - Margaret Murray Washington School
- U Street Corridor
- Whitelaw Hotel

== Northeast ==
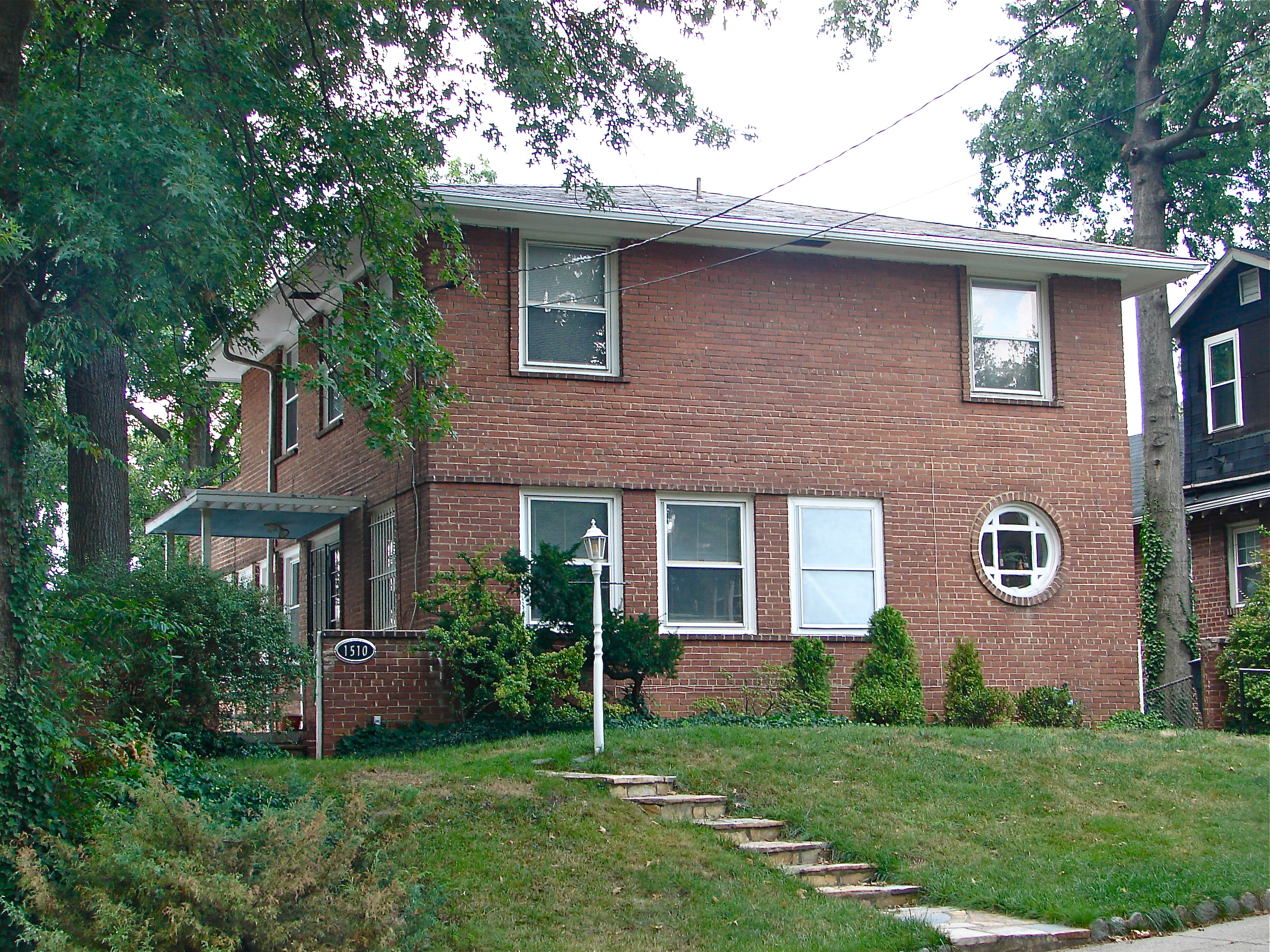
Ralph Bunche House

- Brentwood
  - Ralph Bunche House
- Brookland
  - Sterling Brown House
- Carver Langstron
  - Langston Terrace Dwellings
- Fletcher Chapel
- Langston Golf Course Historic District
- Kingman Park Historic District
- Mayfair
  - Mayfair Mansions Apartments
- Nannie Helen Burroughs School
- Young, Browne, Phelps and Spingarn Educational Campus Historic District

== Southeast ==
- Anacostia
  - Anacostia Historic District
  - Frederick Douglass National Historic Site
- John Philip Sousa Junior High School
- Navy Yard
  - Saint Paul African Union Methodist Church

== Southwest ==
- Friendship Baptist Church
- Lincoln Memorial
- William Syphax School

== Other locations ==
- Camp Greene on Theodore Roosevelt Island
- Evans-Tibbs House
- Gen. Oliver Otis Howard House
- M Street High School
- Phillis Wheatley YMCA
- True Reformer Building

== See also ==
- List of artworks commemorating African Americans in Washington, D.C.
- History of Washington, D.C.
- Timeline of Washington, D.C.
