= Hunter & Bell =

American architectural firm

Ernest C. Hunter (1881–1945) and George Neal Bell (1879–1956) were American architects.

The architectural firm of Hunter & Bell was active in Washington, D.C. during the early years of the 20th century, working primarily in the north-central areas of the city, as the neighborhoods there were being established. Architects Ernest C. Hunter and G.(George) Neal Bell both grew up in Washington; their firm was formed in 1902 and continued on until 1918. They created roughly 800 buildings, largely in the neighborhoods of Adams Morgan, Mount Pleasant, Columbia Heights, and Bloomingdale Little has been documented about their early training, but records show that at the beginning of their practice, the two did collaborate with noted D.C. architect Appleton P. Clark. Hunter and Bell were based in the Southern Building in the District of Columbia; Ernest Hunter was born in D.C. on December 1, 1881, and married Barbara Holmes in 1905. After serving in World War I, Ernest lived for the rest of his life in various VA Hospitals around the country; he died on December 31, 1945. George Bell was born on September 22, 1879, in North Carolina, and then grew up in Columbia Heights. George married Mae Burrows, and lived in the D.C. area up until his death on November 10, 1956.

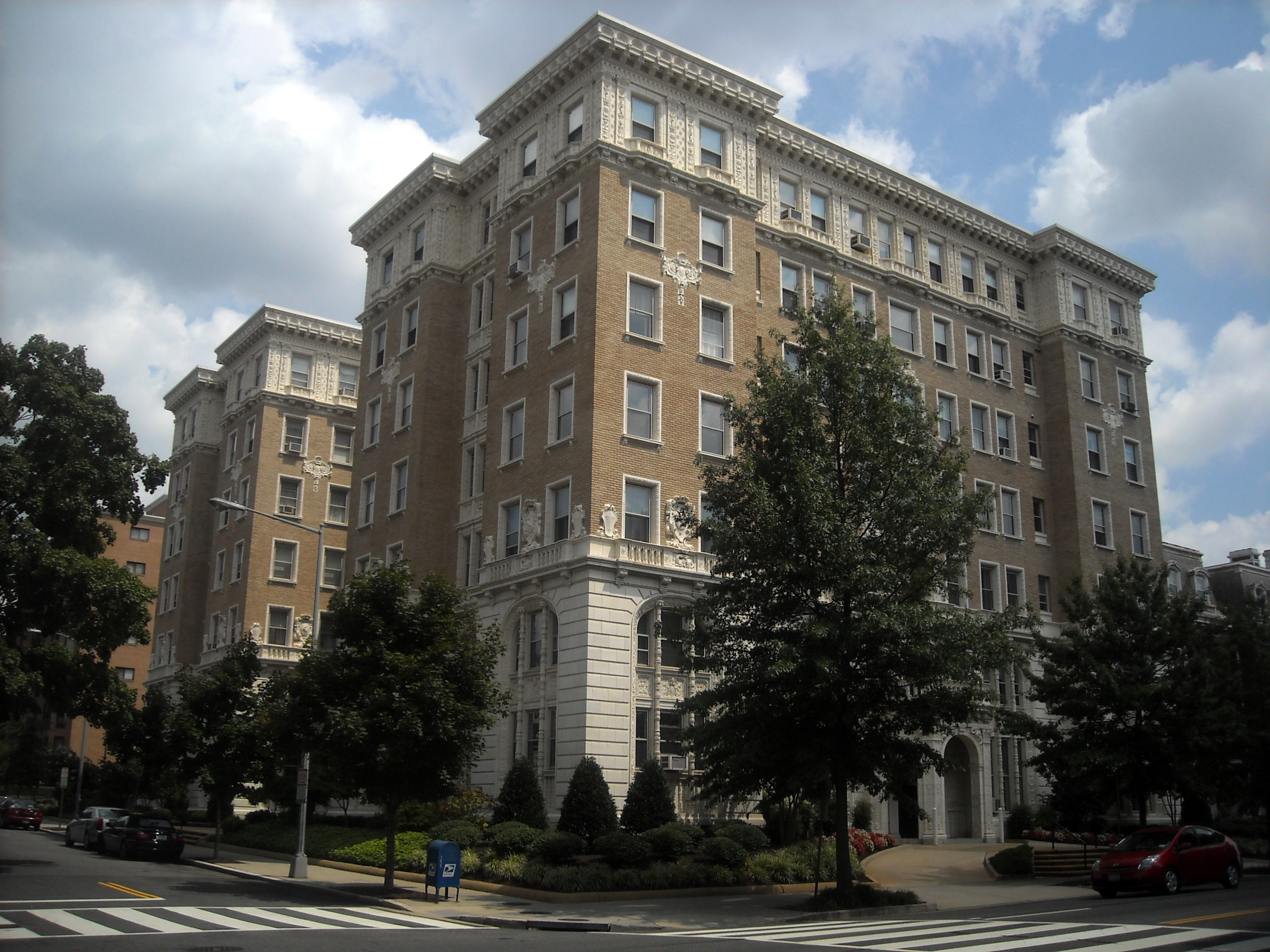
2029 Connecticut Avenue, NW. Designed by Hunter & Bell in 1915, and completed in 1917.

In their practice, the two usually worked with local developers, collaborating mainly with two brothers, John L. Warren and Bates Warren, most often designing speculative residential buildings. Bates Warren had married George Bell’s sister, Lisette, in 1897. The firm of Hunter & Bell left behind a legacy of handsome and solid structures, designing rowhouses, single homes, and apartment houses (along with some commercial properties) in a variety of styles, but most often using the Classical Revival motif. Their work ranged from more modest middle-class buildings to top-level luxury ones. And although their facades were usually done within a traditional style, they generally planned their structures using the most modern of construction techniques. Almost all of their larger buildings are of brick with a reinforced concrete interior, which was then a relatively new construction method. (After World War I, a related design firm continued on for a brief time, as Bell & Rich.)

Several of Hunter & Bell's structures, such as 2029 Connecticut Avenue, NW, have received official historic designations. The firm designed a bit over 50 low-rise and mid-rise apartment buildings; most still exist. And many of the larger of these have now been converted into condominiums or cooperatives, including some of the earliest cooperatives in Washington, such as the Stafford and the Lambert buildings on Lanier Place in the Lanier Heights neighborhood.
