= Fire Station No. 21 =

Fire Station No. 21, and variations such as Engine House No. 21, may refer to:

- Steam Engine Company No. 21, Louisville, Kentucky
- Engine Company 21, Washington, D.C.

== See also ==
- List of fire stations
