= U.S. Civil Service Commission Building =

- U.S. National Register of Historic Places
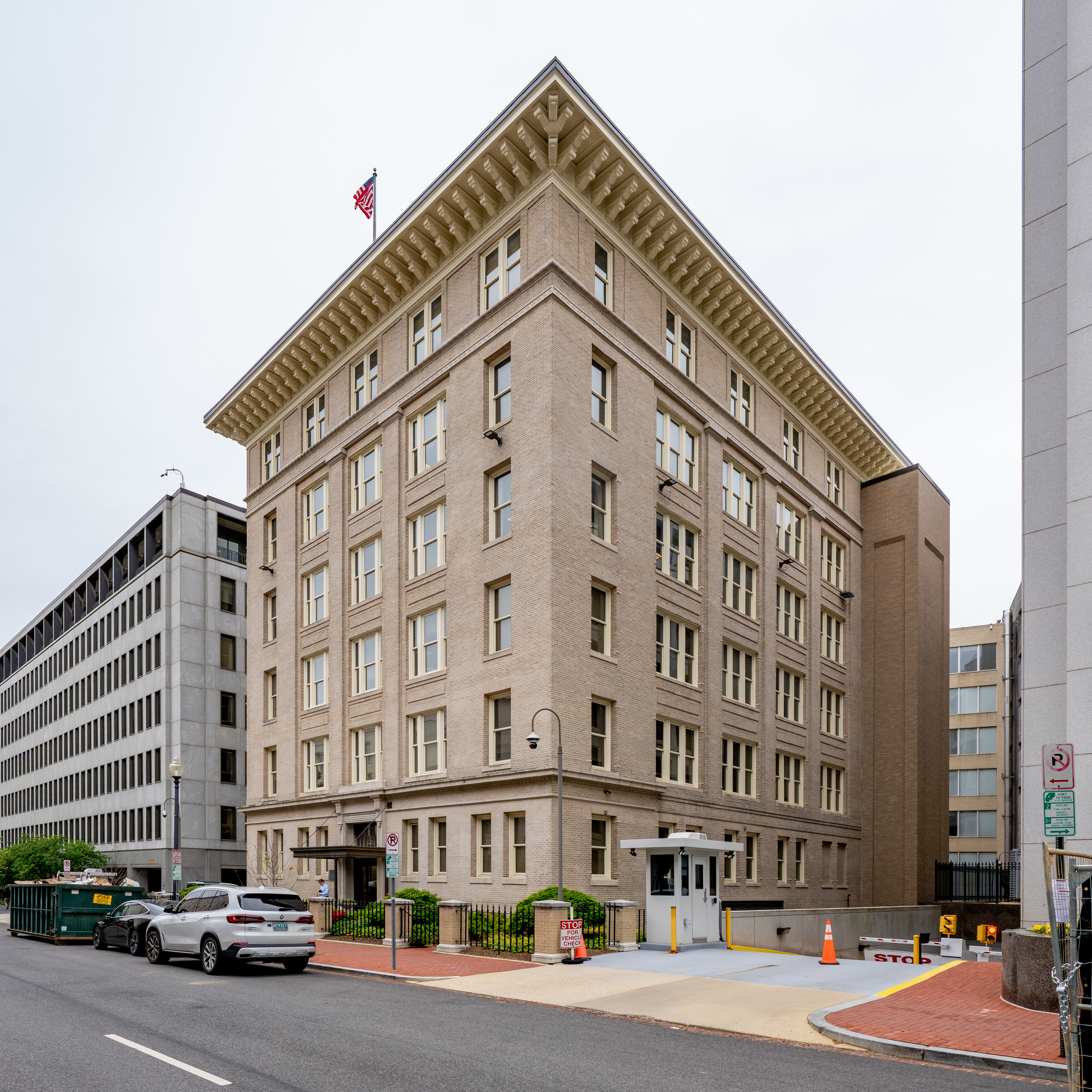
- U.S. Civil Service Commission Building in 2026

- Location within Central Washington, D.C. Location within the District of Columbia Location within the United States
- Location: 1724 F Street NW, Washington, District of Columbia
- Coordinates: 38°53′49.6″N 77°02′26.7″W
- Area: less than one acre
- Built: 1911
- Architect: Appleton P. Clark, Jr.
- Architectural style: Italian Renaissance Revival
- NRHP reference No.: 13000713
- Added to NRHP: September 18, 2013

The U.S. Civil Service Commission Building is a 1911 six story brick building near the White House in Washington D.C. It housed the Civil Service Commission from 1911 to 1932. It currently houses various offices for the Executive Branch and the U.S Trade Representatives. Unlike many federal buildings of the time, it was built by a private developer for the government.
