= Embassy of Myanmar, Washington, D.C. =

Diplomatic mission of Myanmar in the United States

Embassy of Myanmar in Washington, D.C.
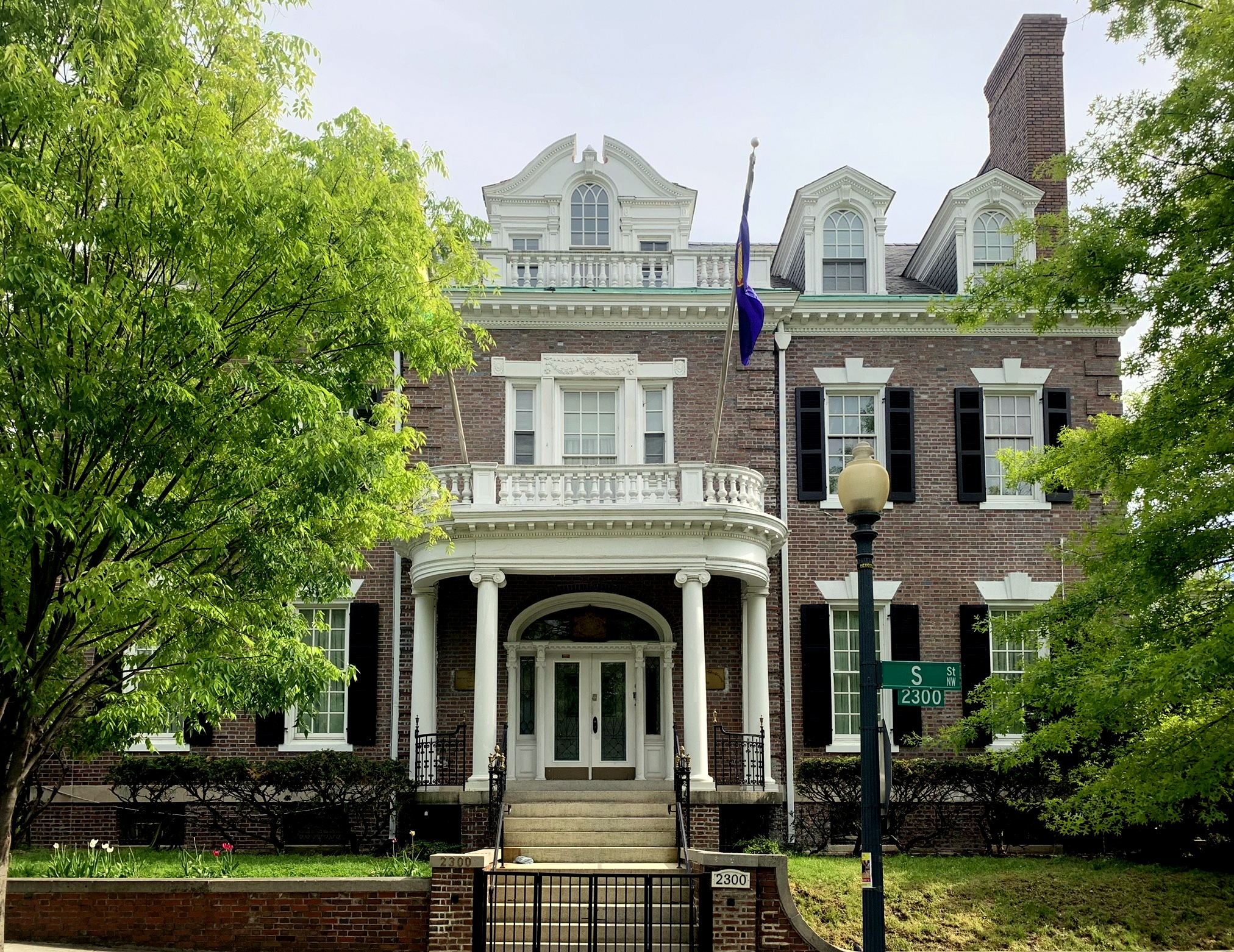
- Embassy of Myanmar in 2022, street-facing south elevation
- Location: Washington D.C.
- Address: 2300 S Street N.W.
- Coordinates: 38°54′50″N 77°3′2.5″W
- Ambassador: Aung Lynn

The Embassy of Myanmar in Washington, D.C. is the diplomatic mission of the Republic of the Union of Myanmar to the United States. The embassy is located at 2300 S Street NW, Washington, D.C., in the Kalorama neighborhood. It has been located here since 1953. The building is a 1905 mansion designed by noted architect Appleton P. Clark, Jr. in the Georgian Revival style, and was originally the private residence of businessman Thomas M. Gales. It was later the home of President Herbert Hoover and his wife Lou Henry Hoover before and after Hoover’s presidency. Hoover sold the property in 1944, when he took up permanent residence at the Waldorf Astoria New York. The ambassadorial residence is in the Charles Evans Hughes House on R Street NW.

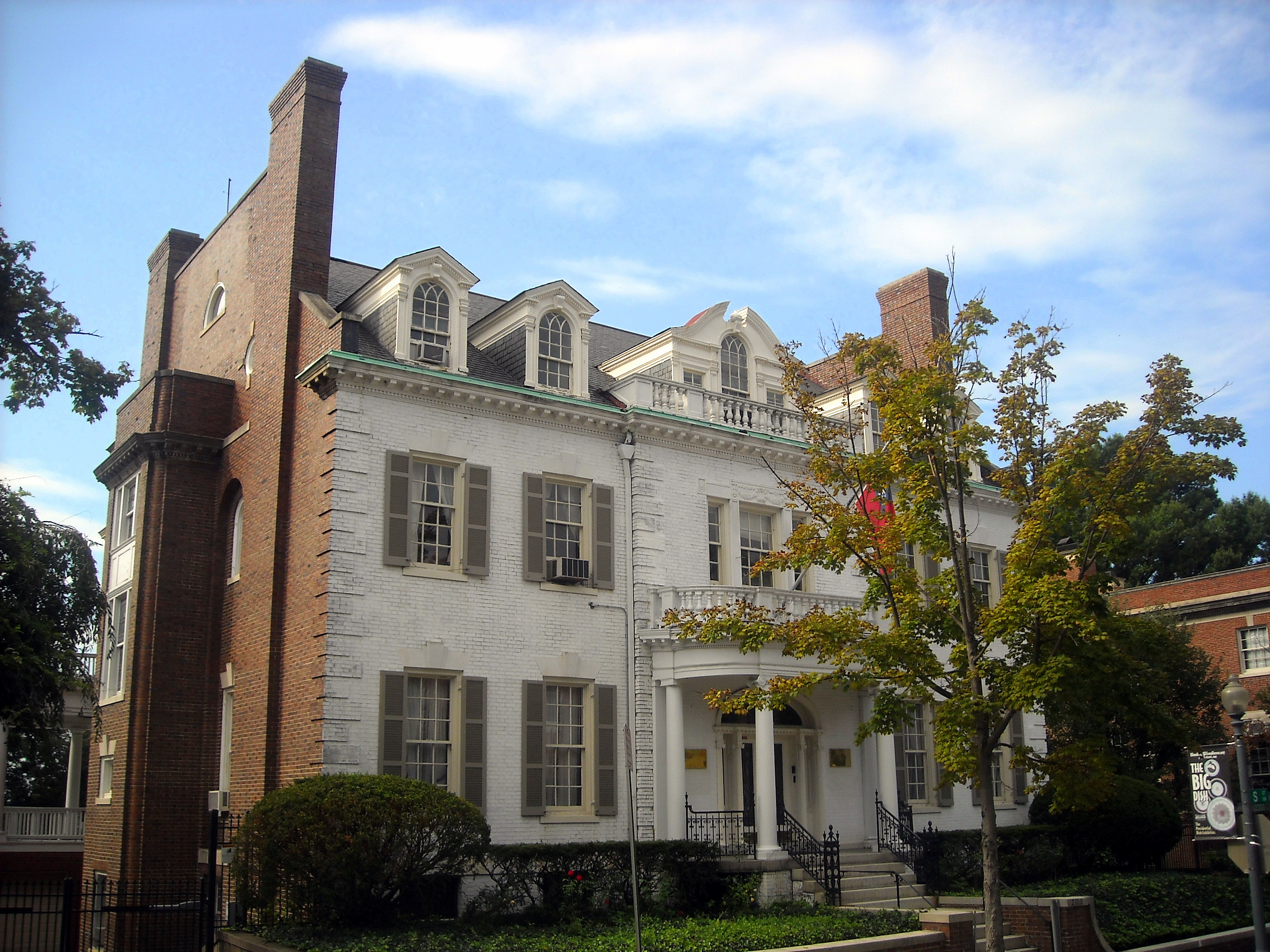
Embassy of Myanmar, north elevation

The current ambassador of Myanmar to the United States is Aung Lynn.

== See also ==
- Foreign relations of Burma
- List of Washington, D.C. embassies
