= John Mercer Langston School =

- U.S. National Register of Historic Places
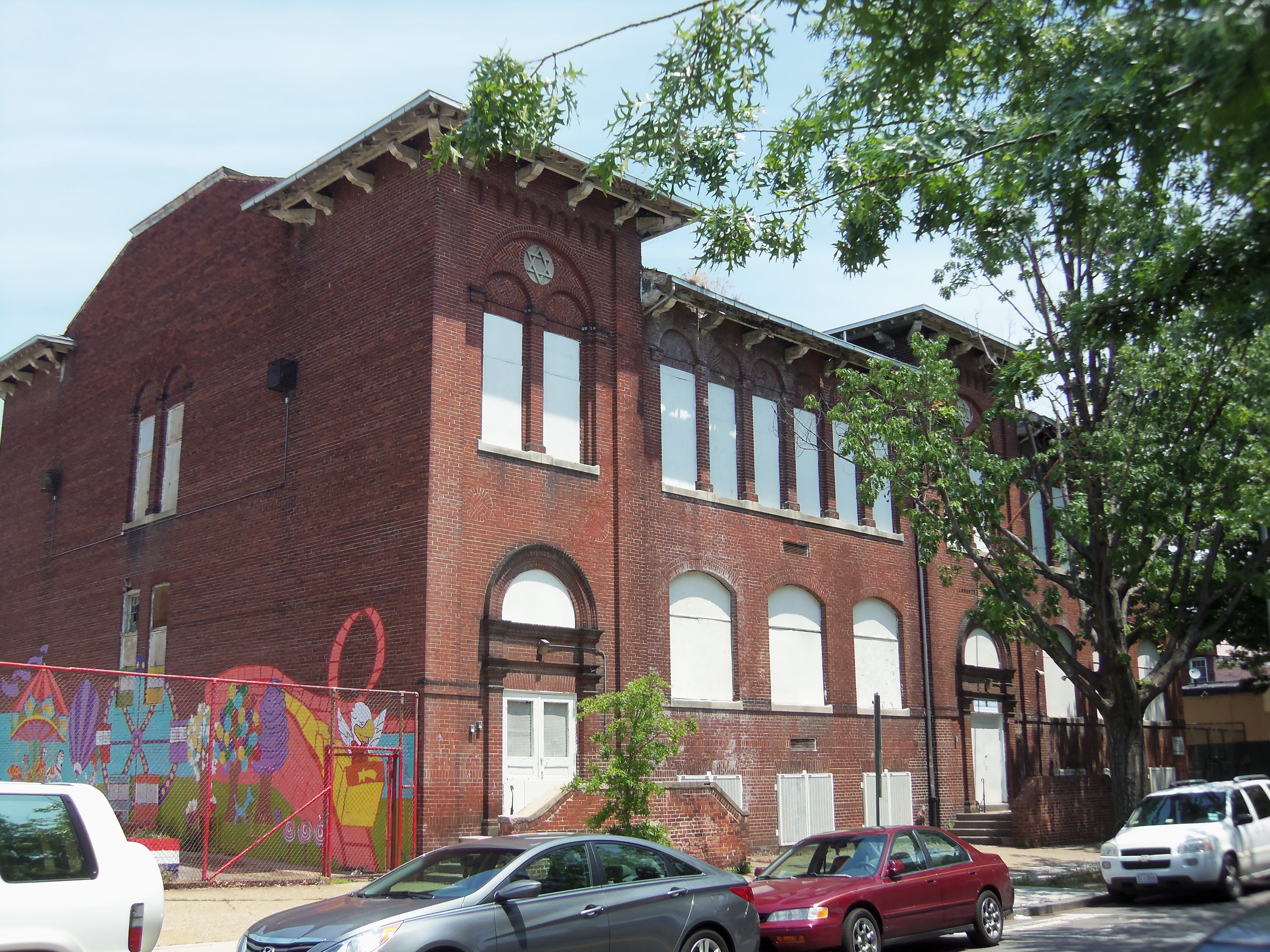

- Location within District of Columbia
- Location: 43 P St., NW; Washington, D.C.
- Coordinates: 38°54′35″N 77°00′36″W
- Built: 1902
- Architect: Appleton P. Clark, Jr.
- Architectural style: Italianate
- MPS: Public School Buildings of Washington, DC MPS
- NRHP reference No.: 13000143
- Added to NRHP: April 9, 2013

John Mercer Langston School is a historic structure located in the Truxton Circle neighborhood in Washington, D.C. The two-story brick building was designed by Appleton P. Clark, Jr. The structure was completed in 1902. It was listed on the National Register of Historic Places in 2013.

== History ==
The school was built for African-Americans in 1902 to accommodate the overcrowding conditions in the neighboring John Fox Slater Elementary School. At the time the building was constructed, public education in the District of Columbia was segregated by race. It was one of several schools for African-Americans along First Street, NW between L and P Streets. Langston School was one of 31 schools opened between 1895 and 1902 during a period of steady population growth in the District, including along the North Capitol Street corridor. On April 3, 1901, the school board voted to name the new school after John Mercer Langston (1829-1897), who was the first African-American congressman from Virginia and was also a distinguished diplomat, academic and lawyer in the District of Columbia.

The school was dedicated in November 1902 and held one day before the fifth anniversary of Langston's death. A portrait of Langston was presented to the school on behalf of his family.

Slater and Langston Schools were operated as independent schools until the late 1910s when the Slater principal, Anna E. Thompson, became principal of both schools. During this time the schools were referred to jointly as Slater-Langston. When Slater was annexed to the Margaret Murray Washington Vocational School in 1951, Langston continued as an elementary school. The school was generally overcrowded before the Supreme Court's 1954 decision banning school segregation. By 1982 the overcrowded condition had reversed and enrollment steadily declined until it was closed in 1997. After its services as a school the building became a homeless shelter. It is now empty.

== Current ==
The property was listed in the National Register of Historic Places in 2013. The area of significance is architecture, education, ethnic heritage/black. The property is currently not in use.

== Architecture ==
The Langston School is a two-story, red brick building that was designed in the Italianate style. It housed eight classrooms, one for each grade level 1-8th. l. The main façade features two entrance towers, one for the boys and one for the girls. A Star of David is placed in each of the blind arches above the second floor windows. The building has an asymmetrical arraignment due to a planned west wing that was never built. It was designed by Washington architect Appleton P. Clark, Jr.

Langston School is significant in the area of Architecture since it is an excellent example of a public school building built for African American students and devised to accommodate an increased need for new school buildings in the city.
