= Appleton P. Clark Jr. =

American architect

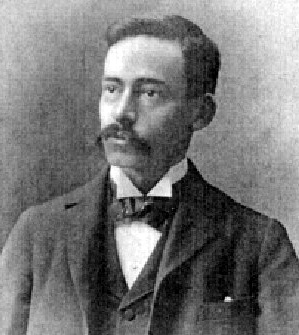
- Born: November 13, 1865; Washington, D.C.
- Died: March 25, 1955 (aged 89); St. Petersburg, Florida
- Occupation: Architect

Appleton Prentiss Clark Jr. (November 13, 1865 – March 25, 1955) was an American architect from Washington, D.C. During his 60-year career, Clark was responsible for designing hundreds of buildings in the Washington area, including homes, hotels, churches, apartments and commercial properties. He is considered one of the city's most prominent and influential architects from the late 19th and early 20th centuries. Many of his designs are now listed on the National Register of Historic Places (NRHP).

== Early life ==
During the Civil War, Clark's family moved from Philadelphia to Washington, D.C., shortly before his birth on November 13, 1865. His father was a lawyer and prominent local Republican who was a strong advocate of voting rights for African Americans. After graduating from Central High School in 1883, Clark apprenticed with prominent architect Alfred B. Mullett until 1885. He then traveled to Europe to observe and study the continent's famous buildings and returned to Washington in 1886 where he opened his own practice. In 1891, he married Vermont native Florence Perry with whom he had two children, Waldo and Marguerite.

== Career ==
Clark originally designed buildings in the Romanesque Revival style, influenced by his time working with Mullett. Examples include Eastern Presbyterian Church (now Imani Temple) at 609 Maryland Avenue NE (built 1891) and the Washington Post Building at 1337 E Street NW (built 1893, razed 1954). Like other architects, his design preferences changed throughout his career. His works include buildings designed in the Colonial Revival, Gothic Revival, Italianate, Renaissance Revival, Shingle and Spanish Colonial Revival styles. Many of his house designs used the Georgian Revival style, including the Thomas Gales House (once the residence of Herbert Hoover, and now the Embassy of Myanmar) at 2300 S Street NW, and the J. Philip Herrmann House (once the residence of William Howard Taft, now the Embassy of Syria) at 2215 Wyoming Avenue NW. One of his house designs, built in 1900 for The Washington Post editor Beriah Wilkins, was a 35-room French Colonial mansion at 1711 Massachusetts Avenue NW (demolished) that was one of the largest residences in the city at the time of its construction.

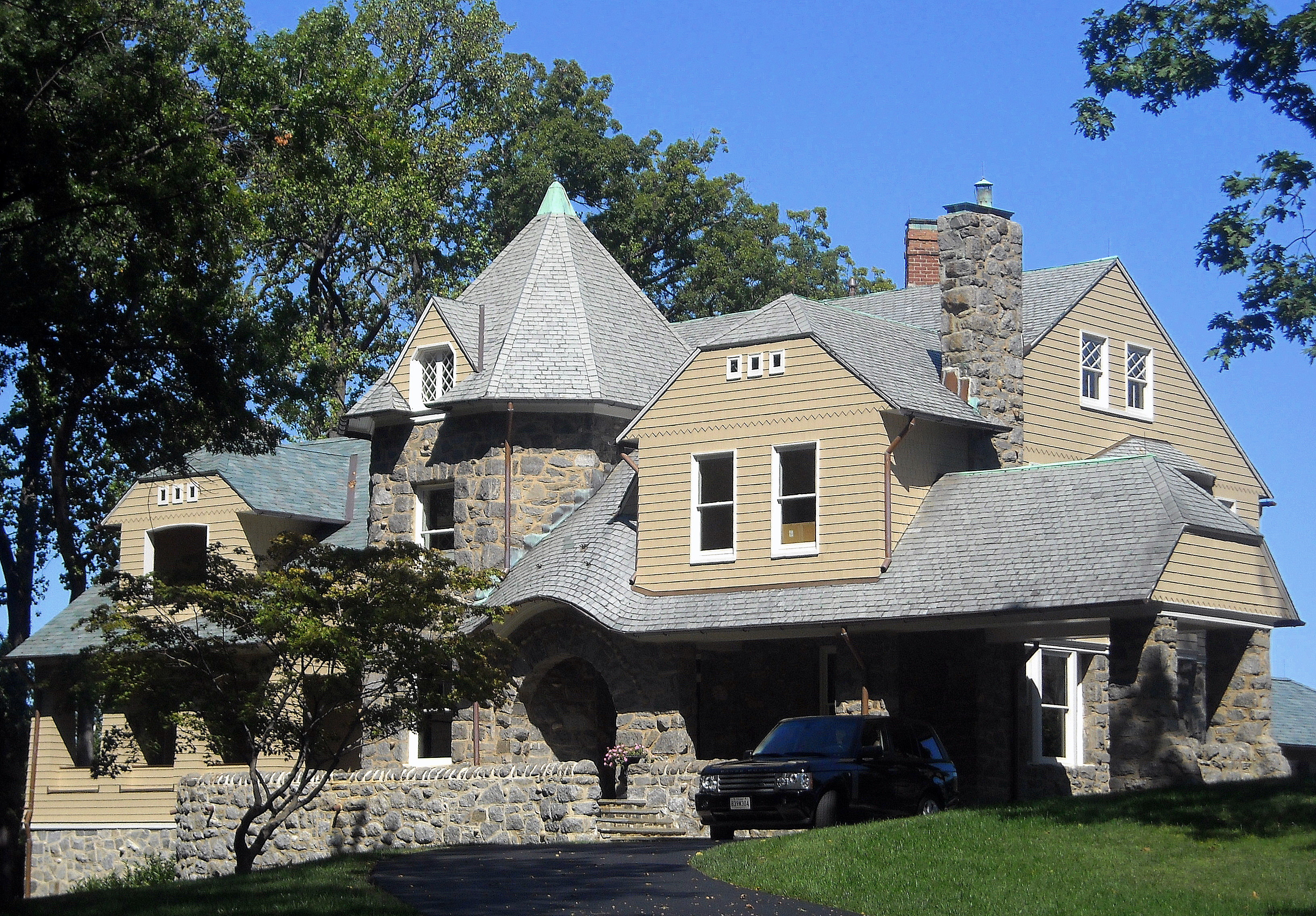
Owl's Nest, designed by Clark in 1897.

Clark's residential designs were not limited to houses. He designed 27 apartment buildings in Washington, D.C., including The Presidential at 1026 16th Street NW, The Rockingham at 1317 Rhode Island Ave NW and The Roosevelt at 2101 16th Street NW. Clark also specialized in designing commercial and public properties, including fifteen banks and five schools. The only known federal property designed by Clark is the U.S. Civil Service Commission Building.

Clark was active with several professional and business organizations. He was "very active in civic affairs and viewed architecture as a vehicle for civic betterment." He was a member of the Washington Board of Trade and American Institute of Architects (AIA), serving as president of the AIA's local chapter. He also served on the board of directors of the Equitable Life Insurance Company, the Terminal Refrigerating and Warehousing Company, the Washington Hotel Company and the Washington Sanitary Housing Company. Clark was also an author, contributing an essay titled "History of Architecture in Washington" for volume II of John Clagett Proctor's Washington: Past and Present, and writing Institutional Homes for Children, a book advocating for improved residential facilities for orphans. A strong advocate for these improved facilities, he designed three children's homes in the Washington area.

== Later years and legacy ==
Clark retired around 1945 and maintained two homes, one at 1717 Lanier Place NW in Lanier Heights, and a winter home in St. Petersburg, Florida. He was hospitalized in 1955 for a broken hip while in St. Petersburg and died on March 25. In his obituary, The Washington Post referred to him as the "Dean of Architects." He left an estate of approximately $700,000 to his family members. Clark is now considered one of "Washington's most influential architects" and one of the "most prominent and prolific early twentieth century architects."

Several of Clark's designs, including buildings he designed expansions or alterations, are now listed on the NRHP, including: 1644-1666 Park Road NW, 1833 Park Road NW, the Christian Heurich Mansion, Engine Company 21, the Denrike Building, the John Mercer Langston School, the National Saving And Trust Company, Riggs National Bank, Second Baptist Church, Second National Bank and the U.S. Civil Service Commission Building. Many of his buildings are also designated contributing properties to historic districts throughout the city. In addition, his buildings listed on the District of Columbia Inventory of Historic Sites include the Homer Building, Owl's Nest, Saint Phillips Baptist Church, and the Victor Building.

== Selected works ==
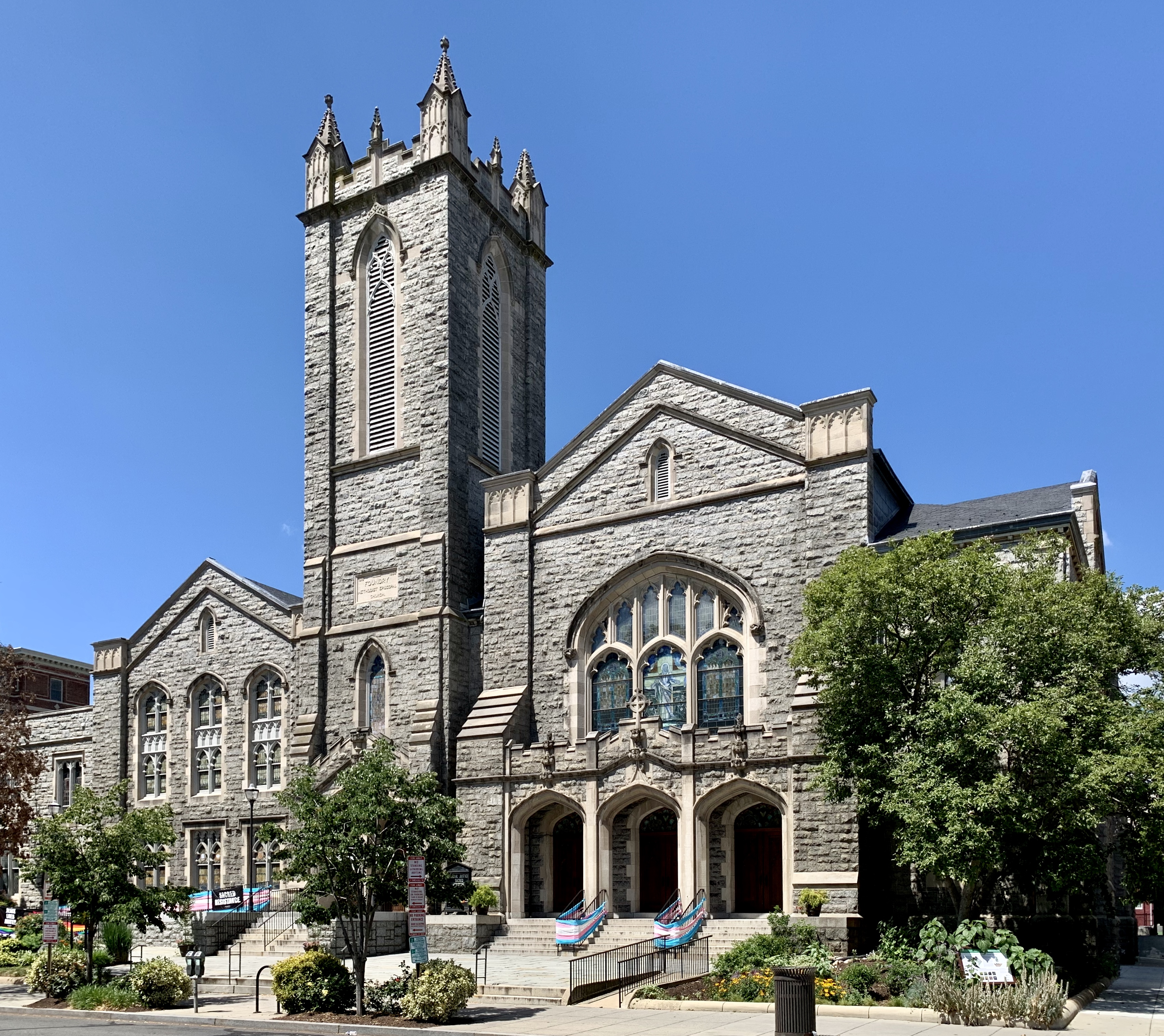
Foundry United Methodist Church (1903)

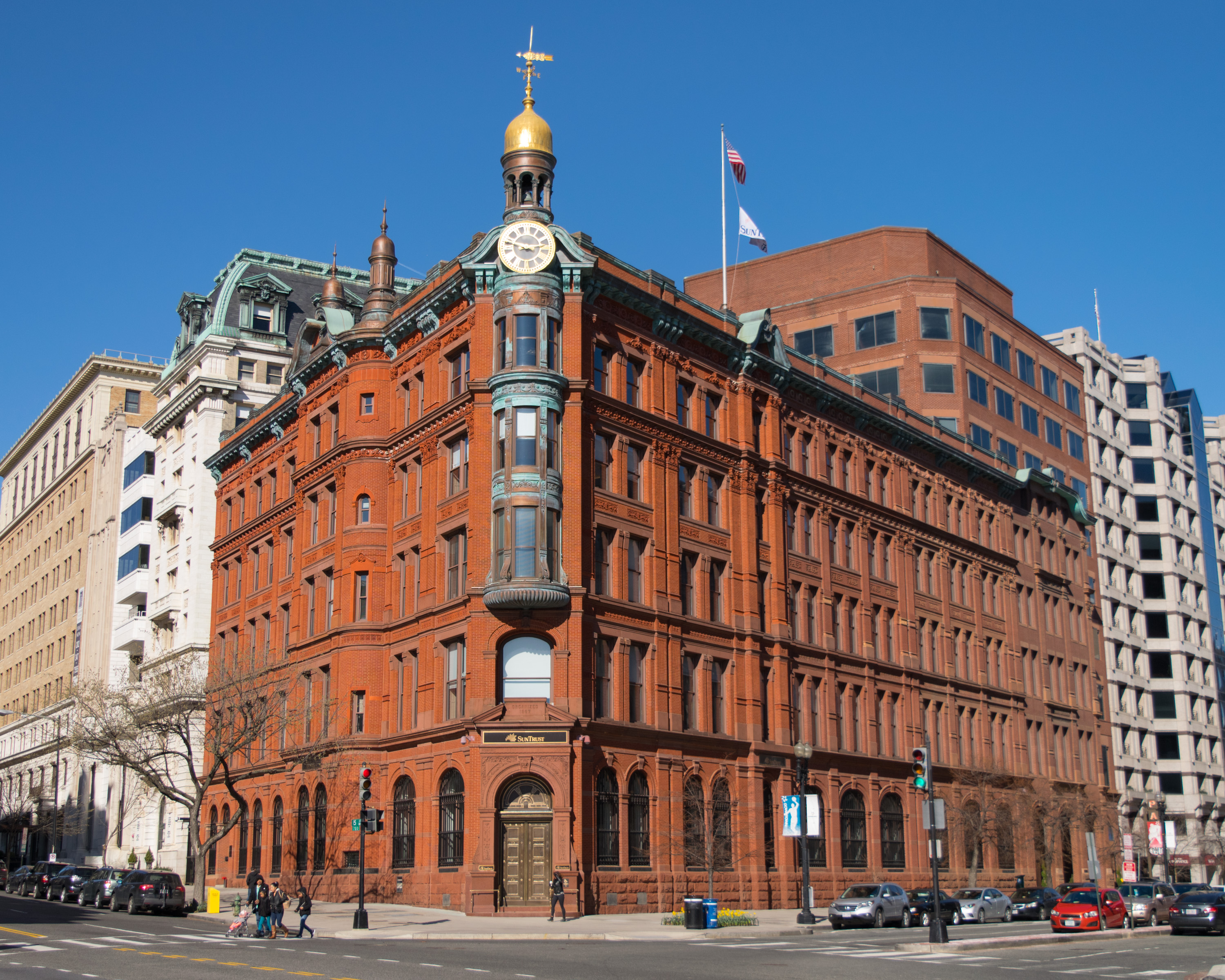
National Savings and Trust Company (1915, 1924 additions)

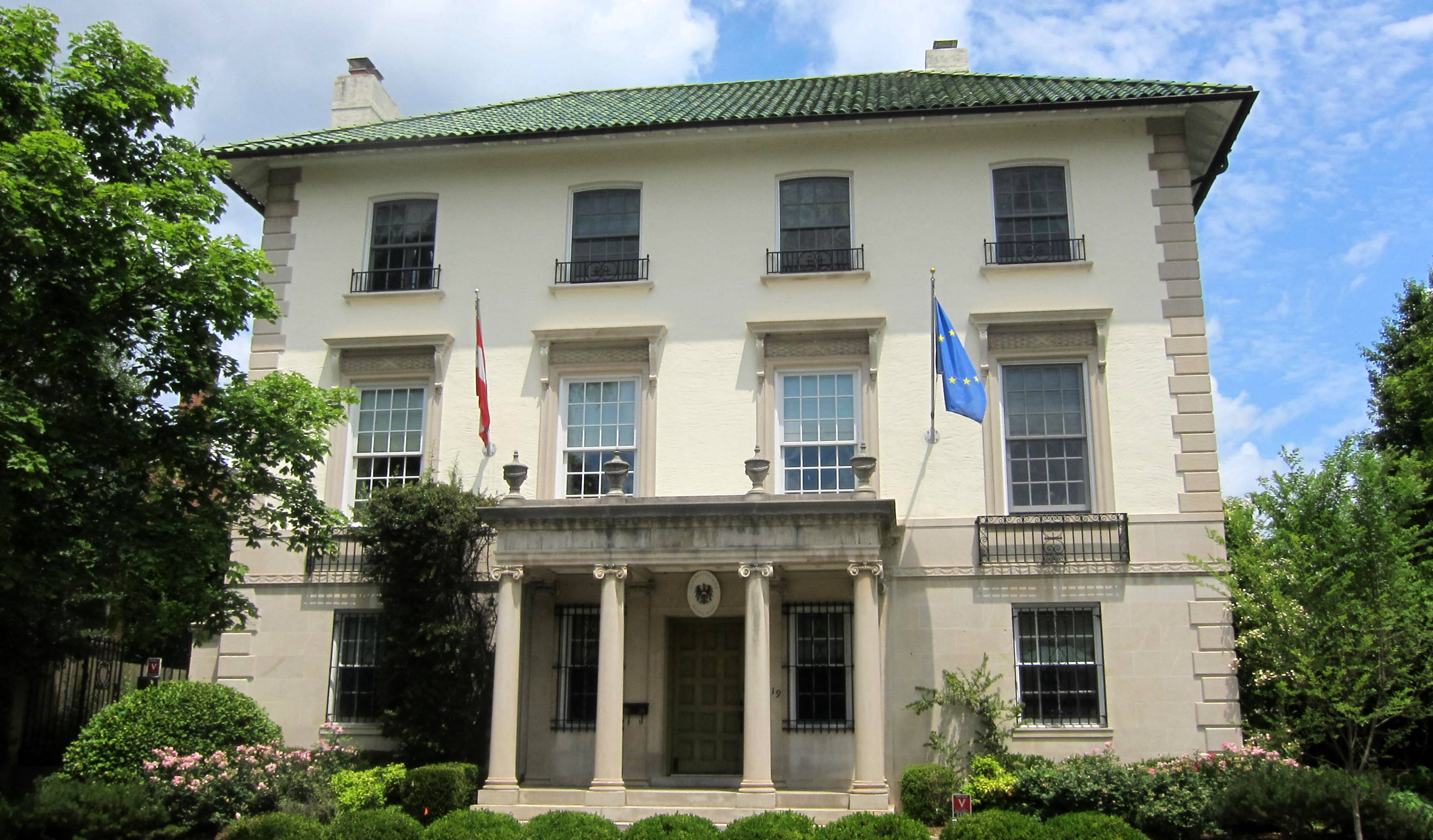
William L. Crounse House, now the Austrian ambassador's residence (1926)

- 312-336 Maryland Avenue NE (1892)
- 313-321 C Street NE (1905)
- 614 S Street NW (1890)
- 1644-1666 Park Road NW (1905)
- 1833 Park Road NW (1911)
- 1849 Kalorama Road NW (1911)
- 1921 19th Street NW (1906)
- 1957 Biltmore Street NW
- 2007 Columbia Road NW (1899)
- 2126 Wyoming Avenue NW (1907)
- The Chelsea, 201 E Street SE (1905)
- Christian Heurich Mansion, 1307 New Hampshire Avenue NW (1914 and 1923 additions)
- Columbia National Bank, 911 F Street NW
- Columbia Title Insurance Company (incorporated into the Keck Center of the National Academies), 503 E Street NW (1924 addition)
- Denrike Building, 1010 Vermont Avenue NW (1926)
- Eastern Presbyterian Church (Imani Temple 1994-2014, now residences), 609 Maryland Avenue NE (1891)
- The Embassy (now the Church of Scientology), 1424 16th Street NW (1917)
- Embassy of the Dominican Republic, 1715 22nd Street NW (1904)
- Engine Company 21, 1763 Lanier Place NW (1908)
- Fazl Mosque, 2141 Leroy Place NW (1913)
- Foundry United Methodist Church, 1500 16th Street NW (1903)
- The Holmes, 3020 Dent Place NW (1902)
- Home Savings Bank, 722 H Street NE (1912)
- Homer Building, 601 13th Street NW (1914)
- The Irving, 3104 Dent Place NW (1903)
- J. Philip Herrmann House (now the Embassy of Syria), 2215 Wyoming Avenue NW (1911)
- John Eaton Elementary School, 3301 Lowell Street NW (1910)
- John Mercer Langston School, 43 P Street NW (1902)
- The Linville, 116 6th Street NE (1914)
- Lincoln Music Hall (Academy of Music), 401 9th St NW. (1899); also designed rebuild in 1907 after the first theater was destroyed in a fire
- The Lurgan, 919 L Street NW (1913)
- Marlo Building, 901 7th Street NW (1895)
- National Saving And Trust Company, 1445 New York Avenue (1915 and 1924 additions)
- Owl's Nest, 3031 Gates Road NW (1897)
- The Presidential, 1026 16th Street NW (1923)
- Riggs National Bank, 1503-05 Pennsylvania Avenue NW (1922 addition)
- The Rockingham, 1317 Rhode Island Ave NW (1903)
- The Roosevelt, 2101 16th Street NW (1920)
- Saint Phillips Baptist Church, 1001 North Capitol Street NE (1892)
- Samuel G. Wheatley Elementary School, 1299 Neal Street NE (1903)
- Second Baptist Church, 816 3rd Street NW (1894)
- Second National Bank, 1331 G Street NW (1928)
- Second National Bank, 509 7th Street NW (1910 alteration)
- The Sterling, 1915 Calvert Street NW (1905)
- Strathmore Hall, 10701 Rockville Pike, North Bethesda, Maryland (1902)
- Thomas Gales House (now the Embassy of Myanmar), 2300 S Street NW (1905)
- U.S. Civil Service Commission Building, 1724 F Street NW (1911)
- Victor Building, 724-726 9th Street NW (1911)
- Washington City Orphan Asylum, 4125 Nebraska Avenue NW (1926)
- William L. Crounse House (now the Austrian ambassador's residence), 2419 Wyoming Avenue NW (1926)

== Bibliography ==
- Institutional Homes for Children, W. Helburn, Incorporated, New York, 1945, OCLC 1157353
