= Second National Bank (Washington, D.C.) =

- U.S. National Register of Historic Places
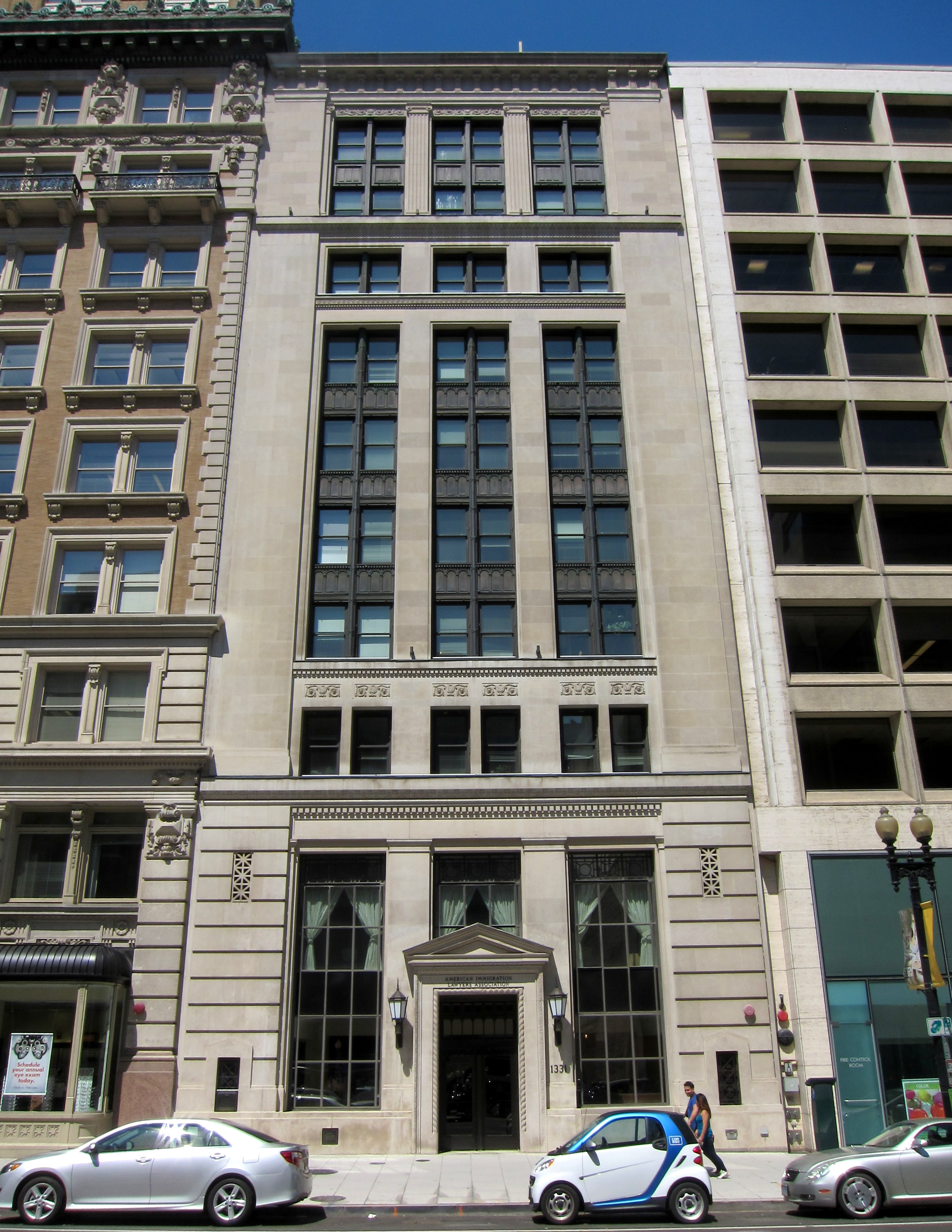
- Second National Bank in 2015

- Location within Washington, D.C.
- Location: 1331 G St., NW; Washington, D.C.
- Coordinates: 38°53′54.8″N 77°1′52.5″W
- Built: 1927-1928
- Architect: Appleton P. Clark Jr.
- Architectural style: Renaissance Revival
- NRHP reference No.: 94001516
- Added to NRHP: December 29, 1994

The Second National Bank is a historic structure located in Downtown Washington, D.C. It was listed on the National Register of Historic Places in 1994.

== History ==
The bank was organized in 1872 and this building served as its second headquarters. It was designed by Washington architect Appleton P. Clark Jr. in the Italian Renaissance Revival style and was built from 1927 to 1928. The banking room was on the main floor of the building and it had rental office space above.

== Architect ==
The building is an example of the flattened neoclassicism that was popular in the 1920s. The exterior of the building is faced with limestone and features bronze infills.
