= Second Baptist Church (Washington, D.C.) =

Historic church in Washington, D.C., United States

- 2nd Baptist Church
- U.S. National Register of Historic Places
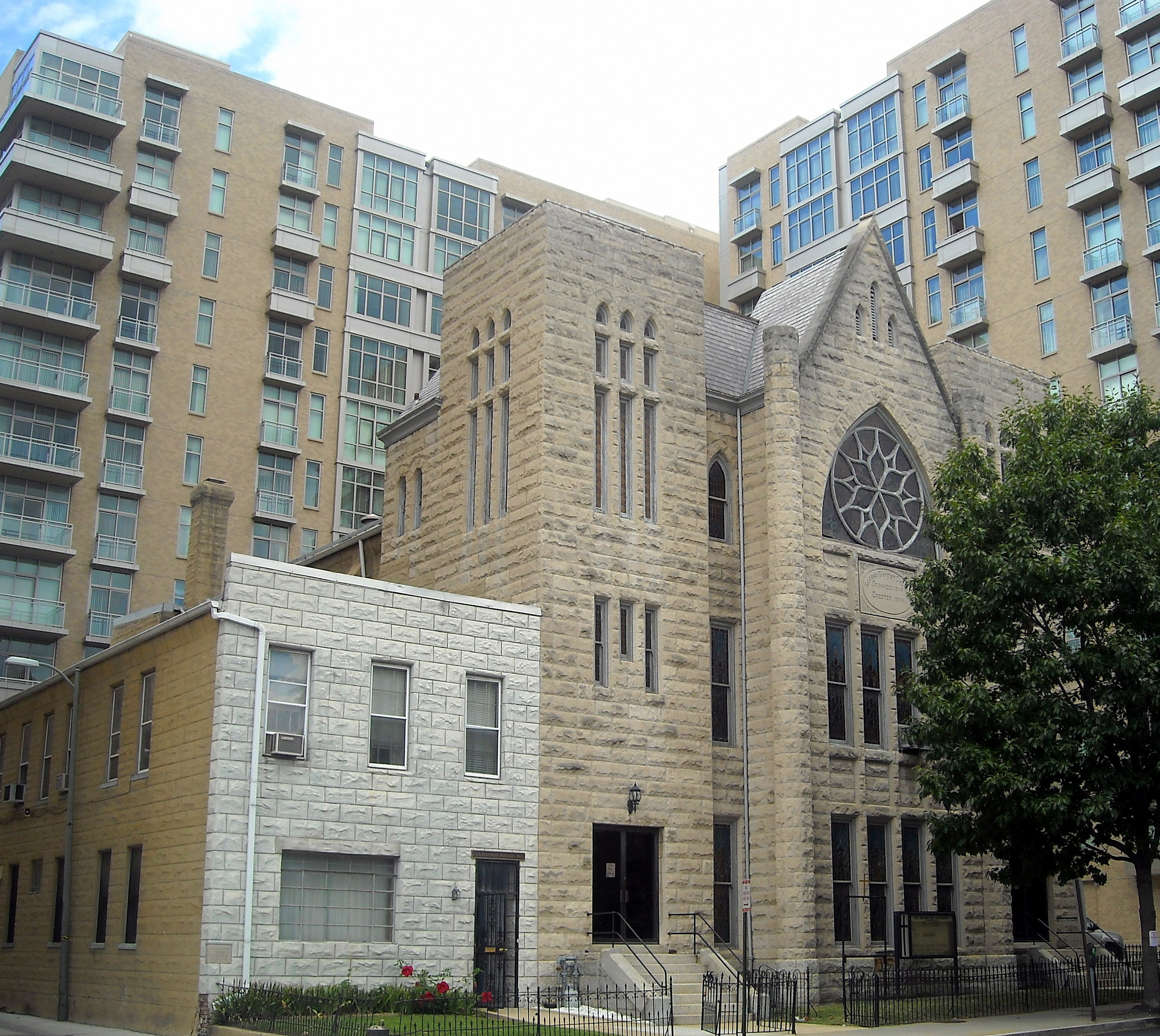

- Location within Central Washington, D.C. Location within the District of Columbia Location within the United States
- Location: 816 3rd St. NW, Washington, District of Columbia
- Coordinates: 38°54′9″N 77°0′57″W
- Area: less than one acre
- Built: 1894; 132 years ago
- Architect: Appleton P. Clark, Jr.
- Architectural style: Late Gothic Revival
- NRHP reference No.: 04000625
- Added to NRHP: June 30, 2004

Second Baptist Church is a historic church located at 816 3rd Street NW in the Mount Vernon Triangle neighborhood of Washington, D.C. The congregation is a member of the District of Columbia Baptist Convention.

It was built in 1894 and designed by Appleton P. Clark, Jr. It was added to the National Register of Historic Places in 2004.
