= Buildings at 1644–1666 Park Road NW =

- U.S. National Register of Historic Places
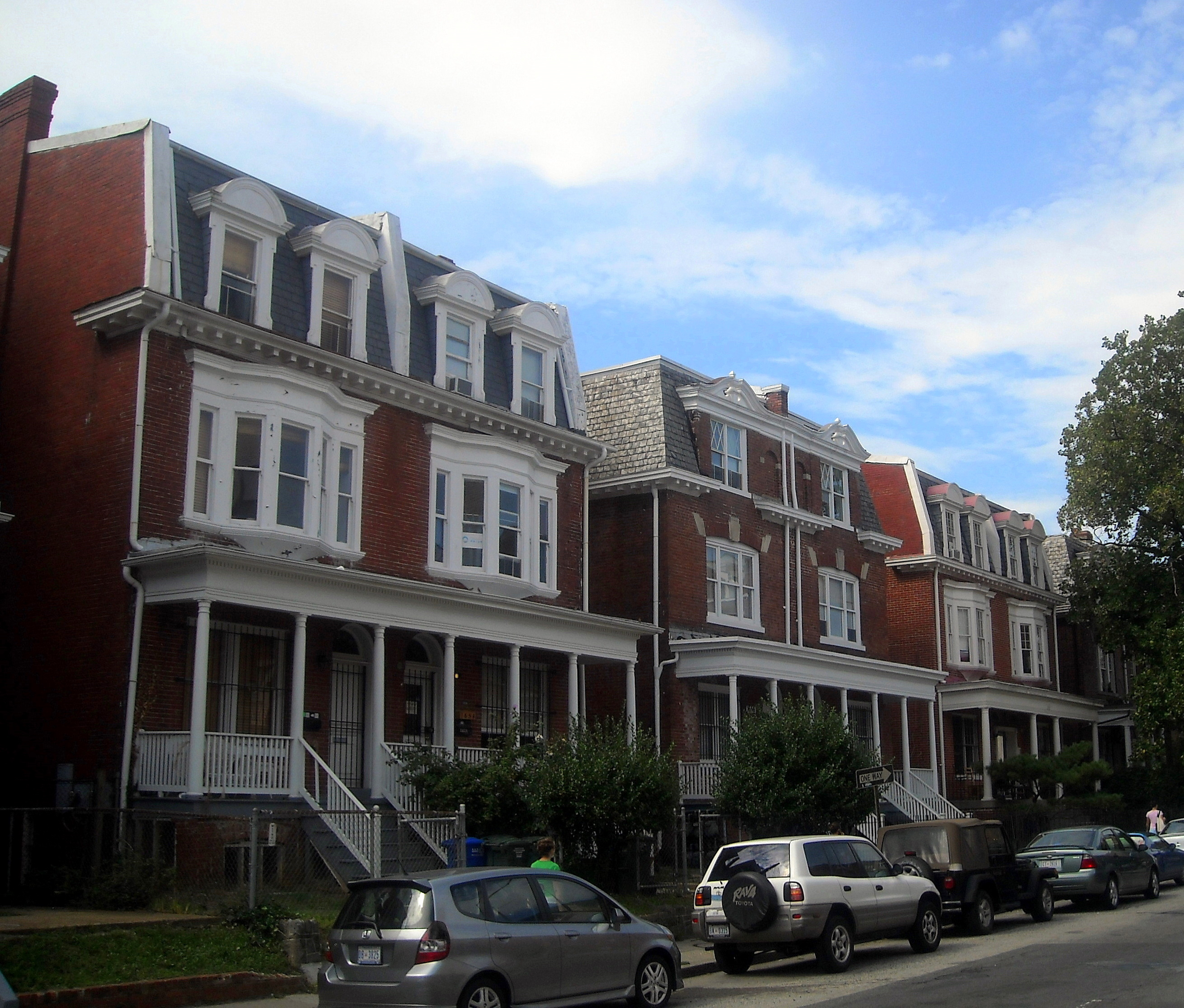

- Location within Washington, D.C.
- Location: 1644–1666 Park Rd. NW; Washington, D.C.
- Coordinates: 38°55′54″N 77°2′17″W
- Built: 1906
- Architect: Appleton P. Clark Jr.
- Architectural style: Colonial Revival
- NRHP reference No.: 86003019
- Added to NRHP: November 6, 1986

The Buildings at 1644–1666 Park Road NW are twelve semi-detached row houses in the Mount Pleasant neighborhood of Washington, D.C. They are typical of speculative row house development in the neighborhood. The houses were designed in the Colonial Revival style by Washington architect Appleton P. Clark Jr., and completed in 1906. They are a few of such houses that he designed and exemplify his facility for eclectic design and sophistication. The houses are three stories in height and the exteriors are covered in brick. They feature slate Mansard roofs and wooden front porches. The styles of the main facades alternate and contain shallow oriel windows, prominent dormers and curved pediments. They were listed in the National Register of Historic Places in 1986.
