= Eighteen Hundred Block Park Road, NW =

- U.S. National Register of Historic Places
- U.S. Historic district
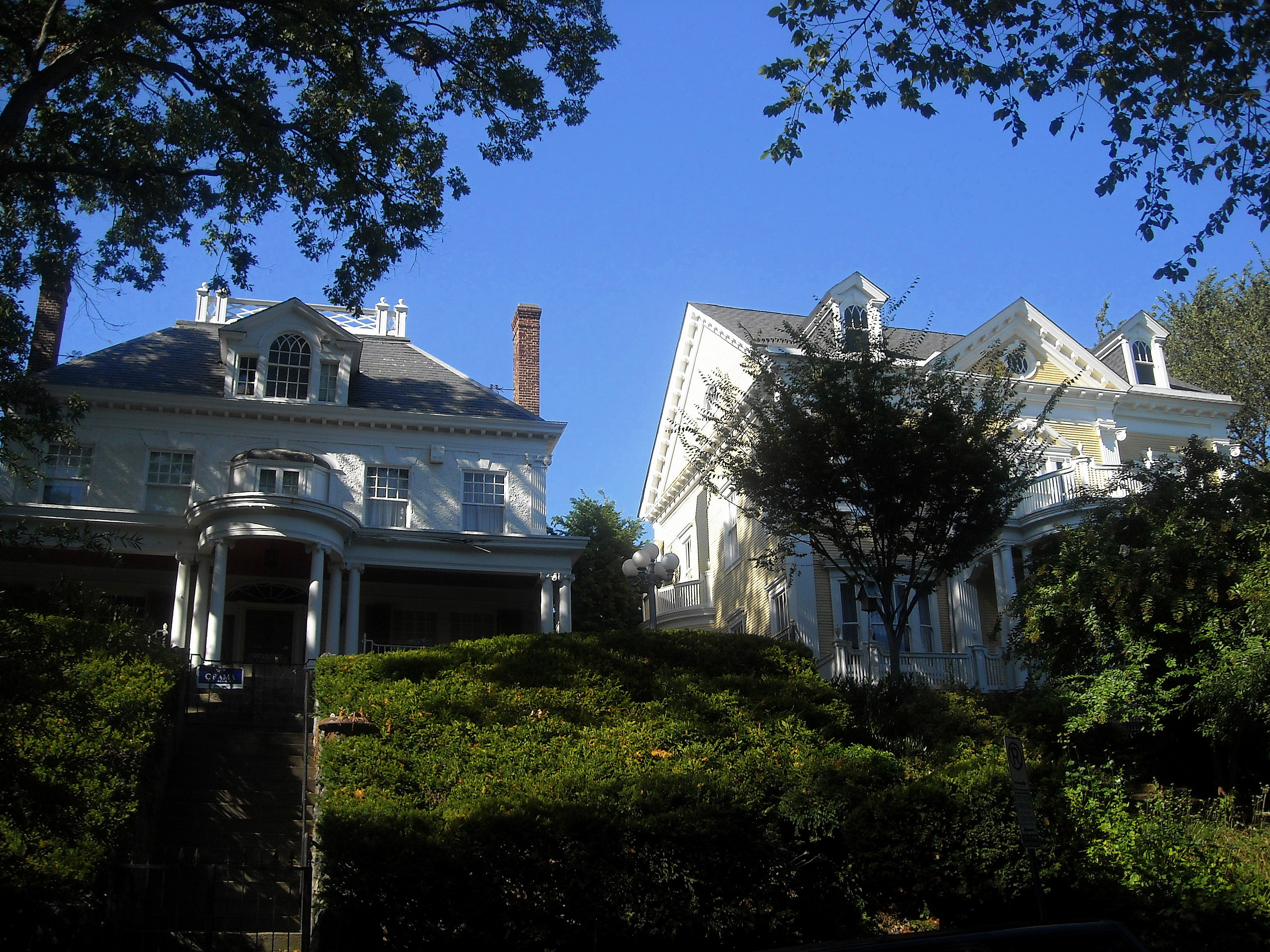

- Location within Washington, D.C.
- Location: 1801-1869 Park Rd., NW. Washington, D.C.
- Coordinates: 38°55′57″N 77°2′35″W
- Built: 1892-1911
- Architect: various
- NRHP reference No.: 78003057
- Added to NRHP: November 15, 1978

The Eighteen Hundred Block Park Road, NW is a collection of ten suburban-style residences and five carriage houses in the Mount Pleasant neighborhood of Washington, D.C. The houses form an historic district and were listed on the National Register of Historic Places in 1978.

== History ==
Built around the turn of the 20th century, the houses occupy terraces above Park Road, which is a curving cross-town street. They are unique in that they are large, custom-designed house in an area of the city that is primarily made up of row houses. The people who built the houses were businessmen, bankers and other professionals. They employed several prominent local architects who designed the houses in a variety of styles, especially Colonial Revival. The architects include Frederick B. Pyle, Harding & Upman, Appleton P. Clark, Jr., and C.A. Didden & Son.

== Architecture ==
Most of the houses are two stories and include both frame and brick structures, some of which are monumental in scale. The styles employed provided various textures and materials, including clapboard, shingles and stucco. They feature multiple roof forms, bays and dormers. The houses have large front porches and porticoes that feature ample window openings, columns and balustrades. Fanlight entrances are characteristic on the street.
