= John Fox Slater Elementary School =

- U.S. National Register of Historic Places
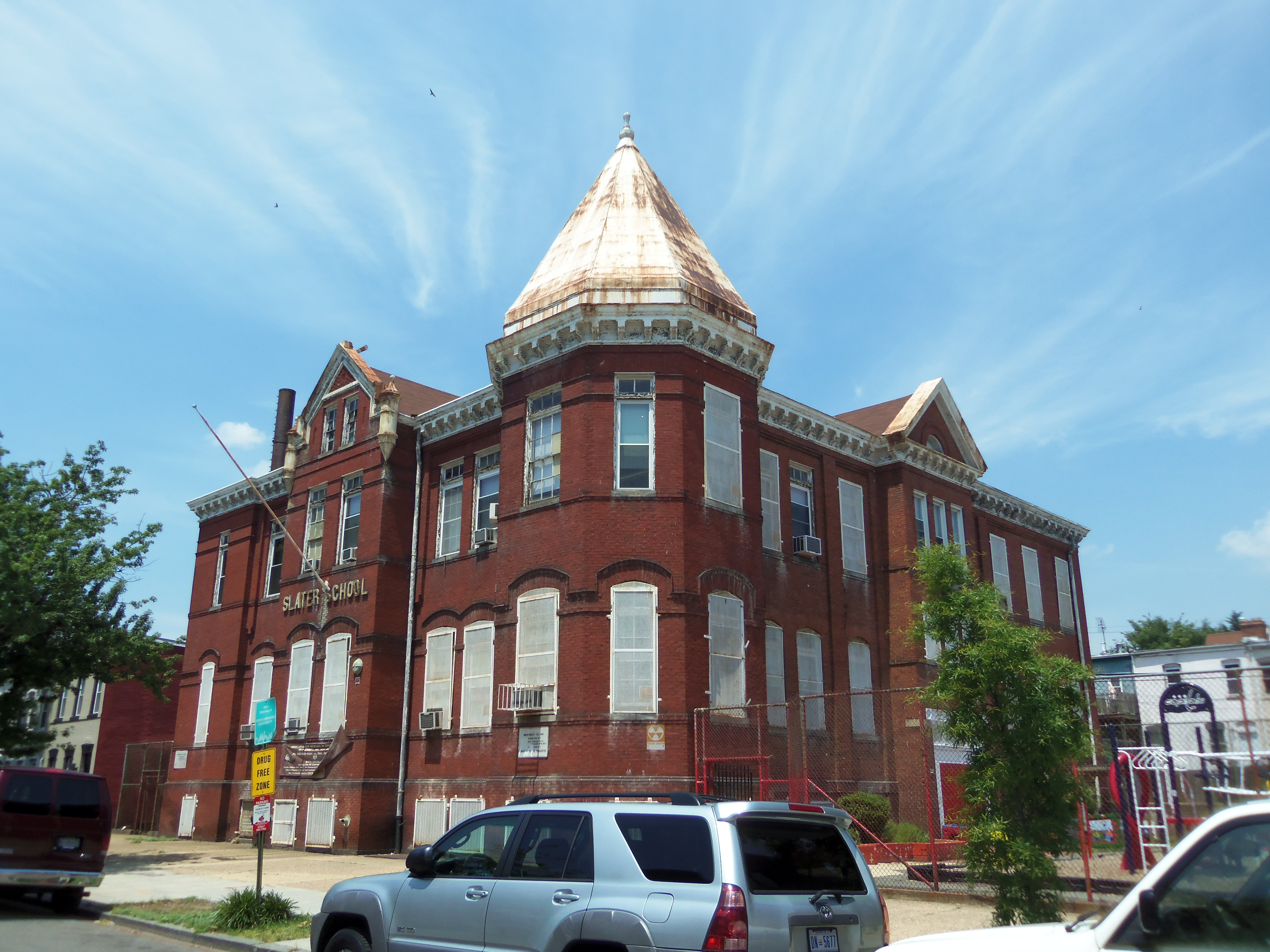
- John Fox Slater Elementary School in 2013

- Location within District of Columbia
- Location: 45 P St., NW; Washington, D.C.
- Coordinates: 38°54′36″N 77°00′38″W
- Built: 1891
- Architect: Edward Clark
- Architectural style: Romanesque Revival
- MPS: Public School Buildings of Washington, DC MPS
- NRHP reference No.: 13000144
- Added to NRHP: April 9, 2013

John Fox Slater Elementary School is an historic structure located in the Truxton Circle neighborhood in Washington, D.C. The two-story brick building was designed by Edward Clark and completed in 1891. It was listed on the National Register of Historic Places in 2013.

== History ==
At the time the building was constructed public education in the District of Columbia was segregated by race. Slater was one of several schools for African-Americans along First Street, NW between L and P Streets. The school for was built in 1891 and it was immediately at capacity. The school was named for John Fox Slater (1829-1897), a white industrialist and philanthropist from Rhode Island.

The John Mercer Langston School was built next door to ease the overcrowded conditions at Slater. Both schools were operated independently until the late 1910s when the Slater principal, Anna E. Thompson, became principal of both schools. During this time the schools were referred to jointly as Slater-Langston. Slater was annexed to the Margaret Murray Washington Vocational School one block to the south in 1951. Langston continued as an elementary school and Slater returned for use as an elementary school in 1958. The building, however, became outdated, it deteriorated and it was still overcrowded. It was featured in a 1965 Washington Post article "Moldy Shaw Fed by Even Moldier Schools." The school was closed in 1975; the building became a daycare center, and it houses a social service agency.

== Architecture ==
Slater Elementary School is a two-story, red brick building that was designed in the Romanesque Revival style. It housed eight classrooms, one for each grade level. The structure features projecting pavilions, gables, towers, and molded brick string courses. Slater is identical to Jackson School in Georgetown that was built for white students in 1889. The only difference between the two buildings was the roof of the corner tower on Slater was covered in tin. The building was designed to fit in with the row houses in the neighborhood. It was designed by Architect of the Capitol Edward Clark.
