= Mount Zion Cemetery (Washington, D.C.) =

Historic African American cemetery

- Mount Zion and Female Union Band Society Cemeteries
- U.S. National Register of Historic Places
- U.S. National Historic Landmark District – Contributing property
- D.C. Inventory of Historic Sites
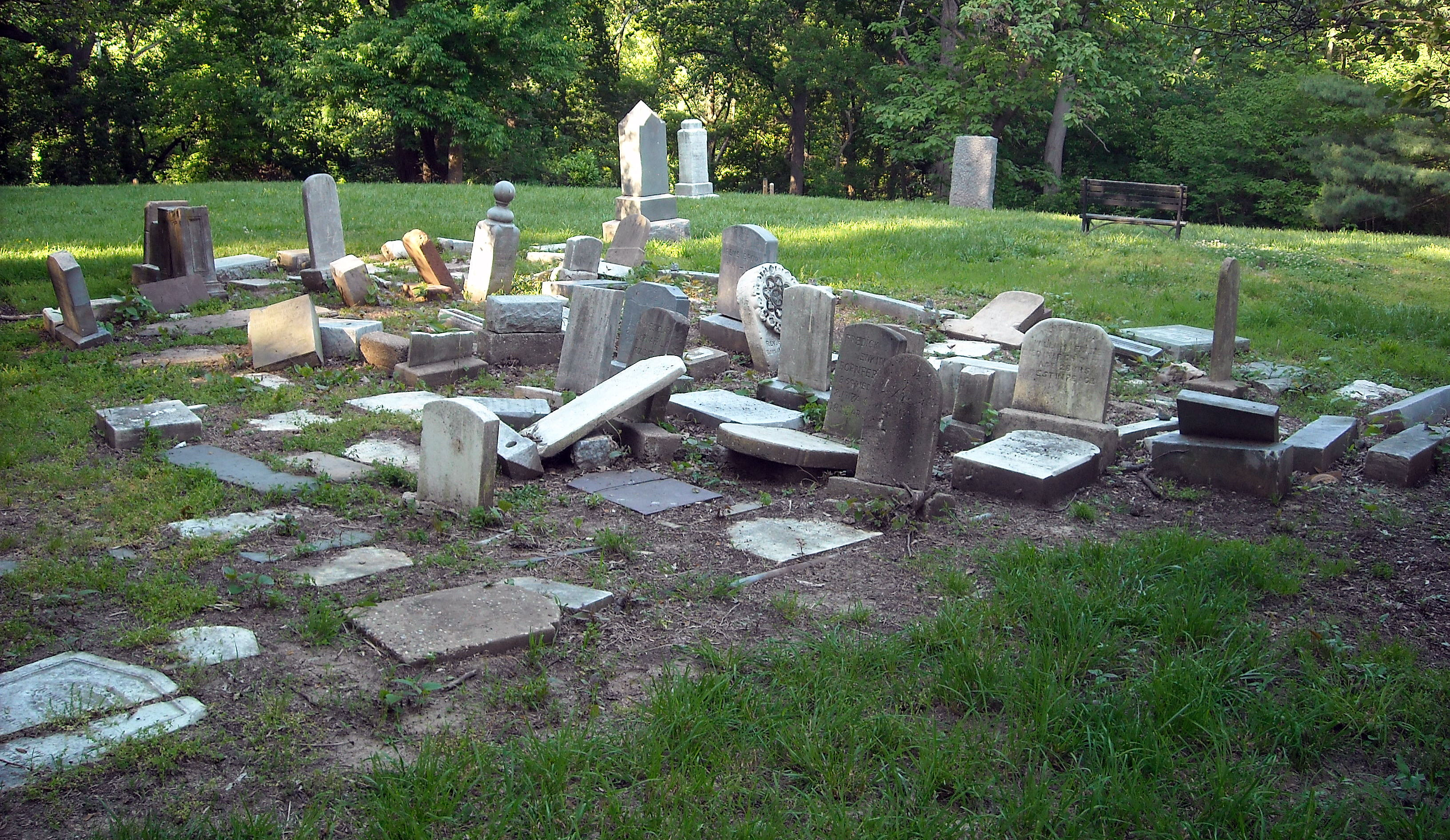

- Location within Washington, D.C.
- Location: 27th Street NW at Mill Road NW, NW; Washington, D.C.
- Coordinates: 38°54′42″N 77°3′16″W
- Area: 3.1 acres (1.3 ha)
- Built: 1808
- Part of: Georgetown Historic District (ID67000025)
- NRHP reference No.: 75002050

Significant dates
- Added to NRHP: August 6, 1975
- Designated DCIHS: April 29, 1975

Mount Zion Cemetery/Female Union Band Society Cemetery is a historic cemetery located at 27th Street NW and Mill Road NW in the Georgetown neighborhood of Washington, D.C., United States. The cemetery is actually two adjoining burial grounds: the Mount Zion Cemetery and Female Union Band Society Cemetery. Together these cemeteries occupy approximately three and a half acres of land. The property fronts Mill Road NW and overlooks Rock Creek Park to the rear. Mount Zion Cemetery, positioned to the East, is approximately 67,300 square feet in area; the Female Union Band Cemetery, situated to the West, contains approximately 66,500 square feet. Mount Zion Cemetery, founded in 1808 as The Old Methodist Burial Ground, was leased property later sold to Mount Zion United Methodist Church. Although the cemetery buried both White and Black persons since its inception, it served an almost exclusively African American population after 1849. In 1842, the Female Union Band Society purchased the western lot to establish a secular burying ground for African Americans. Both cemeteries were abandoned by 1950.

Both cemeteries are considered a single unit, and were added to the National Register of Historic Places on August 6, 1975.

== History ==
In the early 1800s Georgetown was the northernmost port on the Potomac River. It was a major port for the slave and tobacco trade in the area and a center for mills and markets for the newly created city of Washington. Its population was one-third black – half freedmen and half slaves.

In 1808, the Montgomery Street Church purchased the property which would become Mt. Zion Cemetery for the burial of their church members and their enslaved, freed Black persons and descendants. The Montgomery Street Church was known as the Dumbarton Street Methodist Episcopal Church after 1850.

Many members of the Black community attended the Montgomery Street Church. Between 1801 and 1810 their numbers fluctuated between 37 and 97. At times, nearly 50% of the congregation consisted of "coloured brethren." The congregation was segregated by the White governed church. On June 3, 1814, about 123 Black members met to consider forming a separate congregation under the supervision of the parent church. In 1814, a group of Black members left the Montgomery Street Church to establish their own congregation. Named the Mount Zion Episcopal Church, the congregation would be recognized later as Mount Zion United Methodist Church.

The Female Union Band Society was a cooperative benevolent society formed by freed Black women whose members were pledged to assist one another in sickness and in death. They desired a separate burying ground for Black persons. In 1842, the Society purchased the lands adjacent to the West boundary of the Methodist burying ground. On May 24, 1879, Mount Zion United Methodist Church leased their historic burying ground to the Mount Zion United Methodist Church for 99 years. In ensuing years the Female Union Band Society and Mount Zion Cemeteries were often referred to as the single entity Mount Zion Cemetery.

These burial grounds are the resting place of enslaved and freed Black persons, their descendants, and a small number of individuals of European heritage (those not disinterred and reburied in other cemeteries). Unconfirmed representations suggest several German soldiers, fighting as members of the Kings German Legion in the War of 1812, are buried in the Mount Zion cemetery. The cemeteries are believed to have served as an extension of the nearby Black community of Georgetown for enslaved persons seeking freedom via the 'Underground Railroad'.

Interments ceased in 1950.

The Afro-American Bicentennial Corporation conducted a historical study of the Mt. Zion section of the cemetery.

The Mount Zion Cemetery/ Female Union Band Cemetery is one of the oldest remaining African American burial grounds in Georgetown and greater Washington, D.C.. As such, the Joint Committee on Landmarks designated the cemetery a Category II Landmark of importance that contributes to the cultural and visual beauty of the District. It was officially listed in the Register on August 6, 1975, in the areas of Archeology – Historic and Social/Humanitarian with an 1809–1950 period of significance. While the cemetery is located within the Georgetown Historic District, its historical significance is sufficiently different to merit individual registration. The cemetery was added to the District of Columbia Inventory of Historic Sites in 1975, and was placed on the National Register of Historic Places, on August 6, 1975.

Preservation, restoration and education programs are managed on behalf of the Trustees of the two cemeteries by the Mount Zion – Female Union Band Historic Memorial Park, Inc..
