= Mount Zion United Methodist Church (Washington, D.C.) =

Historic church in Washington, D.C., United States

- U.S. National Register of Historic Places
- U.S. National Historic Landmark District – Contributing property
- D.C. Inventory of Historic Sites
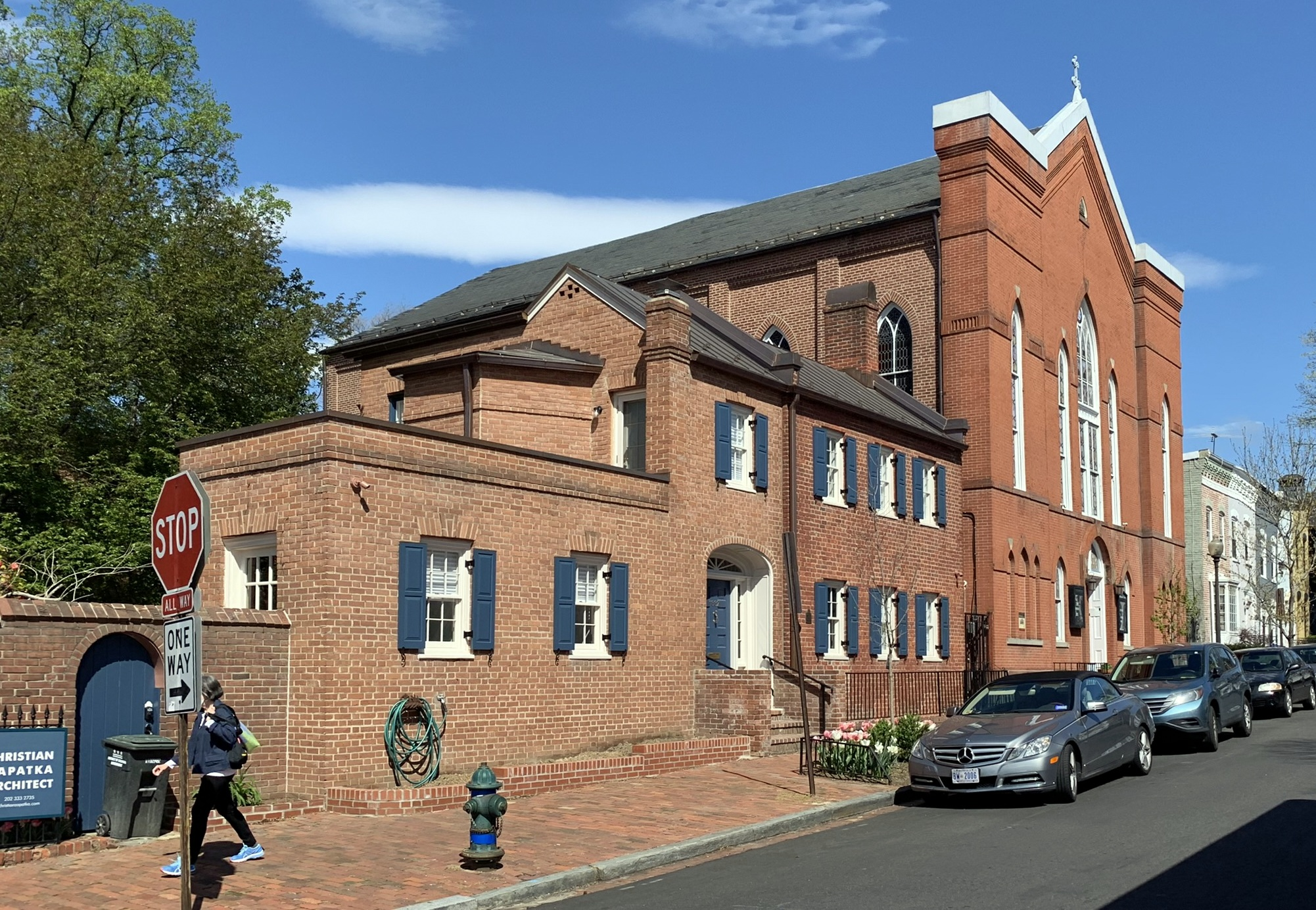
- Mount Zion United Methodist Church in 2022

- Location within Washington, D.C.
- Location: 1334 29th St., NW., Washington, District of Columbia
- Coordinates: 38°54′28″N 77°3′31″W
- Area: 0.1 acres (0.040 ha)
- Built: 1876
- Architectural style: Gothic Revival
- NRHP reference No.: 75002051

Significant dates
- Added to NRHP: July 24, 1975
- Designated DCIHS: June 27, 1974

Mount Zion United Methodist Church is a historic black church located at 1334 29th Street NW in the Georgetown neighborhood of Washington, D.C., United States.

It was built in 1876 and added to the National Register of Historic Places in 1975.

== See also ==
- Mount Zion Cemetery (Washington, D.C.)
