= Engine Company 21 (Washington, D.C.) =

- U.S. National Register of Historic Places
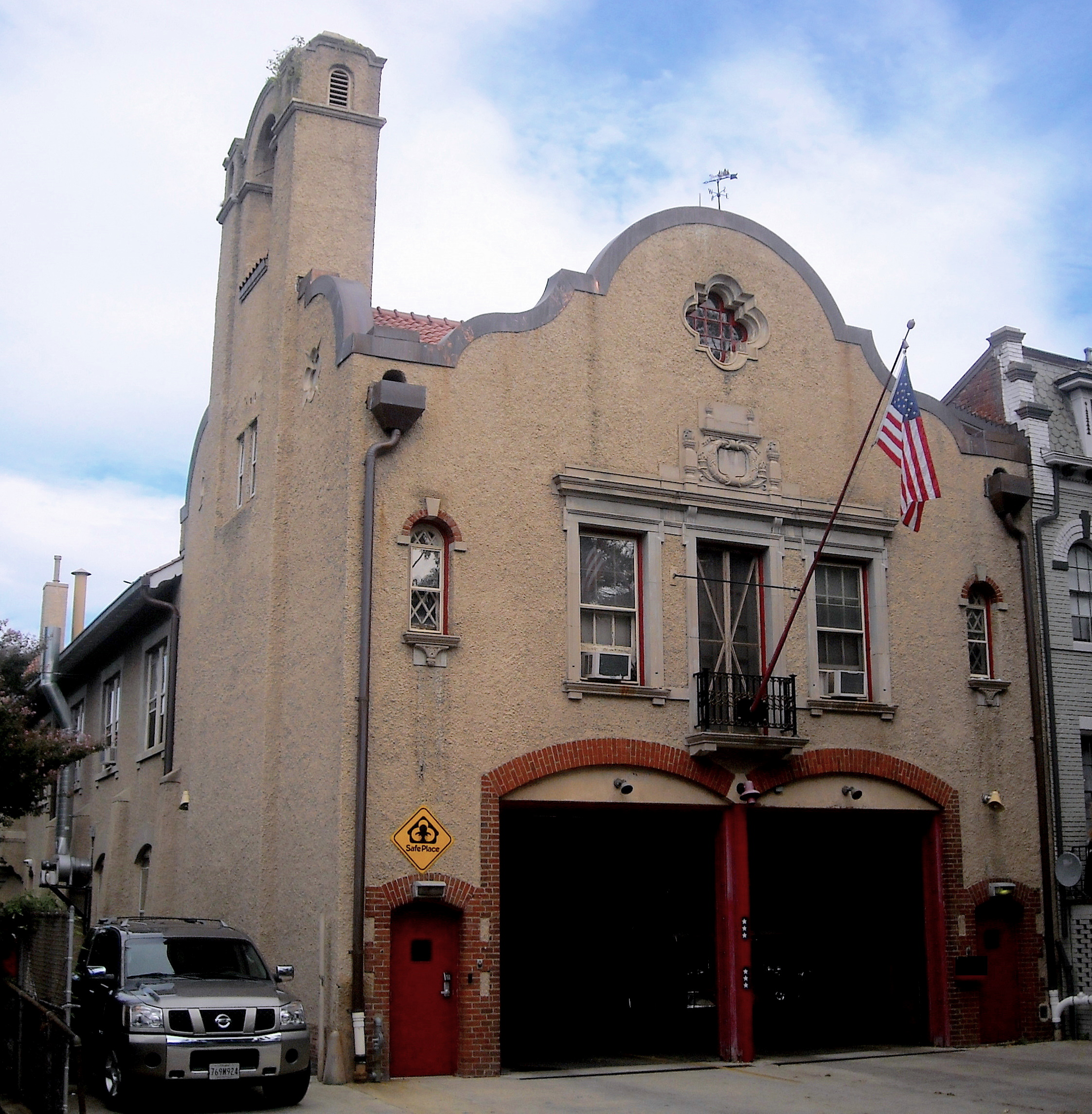
- Engine Company 21 building (2008)

- Location within Washington, D.C.
- Location: 1763 Lanier Place NW; Washington, D.C.
- Coordinates: 38°55′34″N 77°02′31″W
- Built: 1908
- Architect: Appleton P. Clark, Jr.
- MPS: Firehouses in Washington DC MPS
- NRHP reference No.: 07000594
- Added to NRHP: June 27, 2007

Engine Company 21, also known as the Lanier Heights Firehouse, is a fire station or firehouse and a historic structure located in the Lanier Heights neighborhood in Washington, D.C. It was listed on the District of Columbia Inventory of Historic Sites in 2005 and on the National Register of Historic Places in 2007. The building is attributed to local architect Appleton P. Clark, Jr., and built in 1908 in the Spanish Colonial Revival style. The station was built to serve the growing suburban areas of Washington north of Florida Avenue, NW. Because of its proximity to numerous multistory apartment buildings it housed the longest hook-and-ladder truck in the city.
