= Truxton Circle =

- Neighborhood of Washington, D.C.
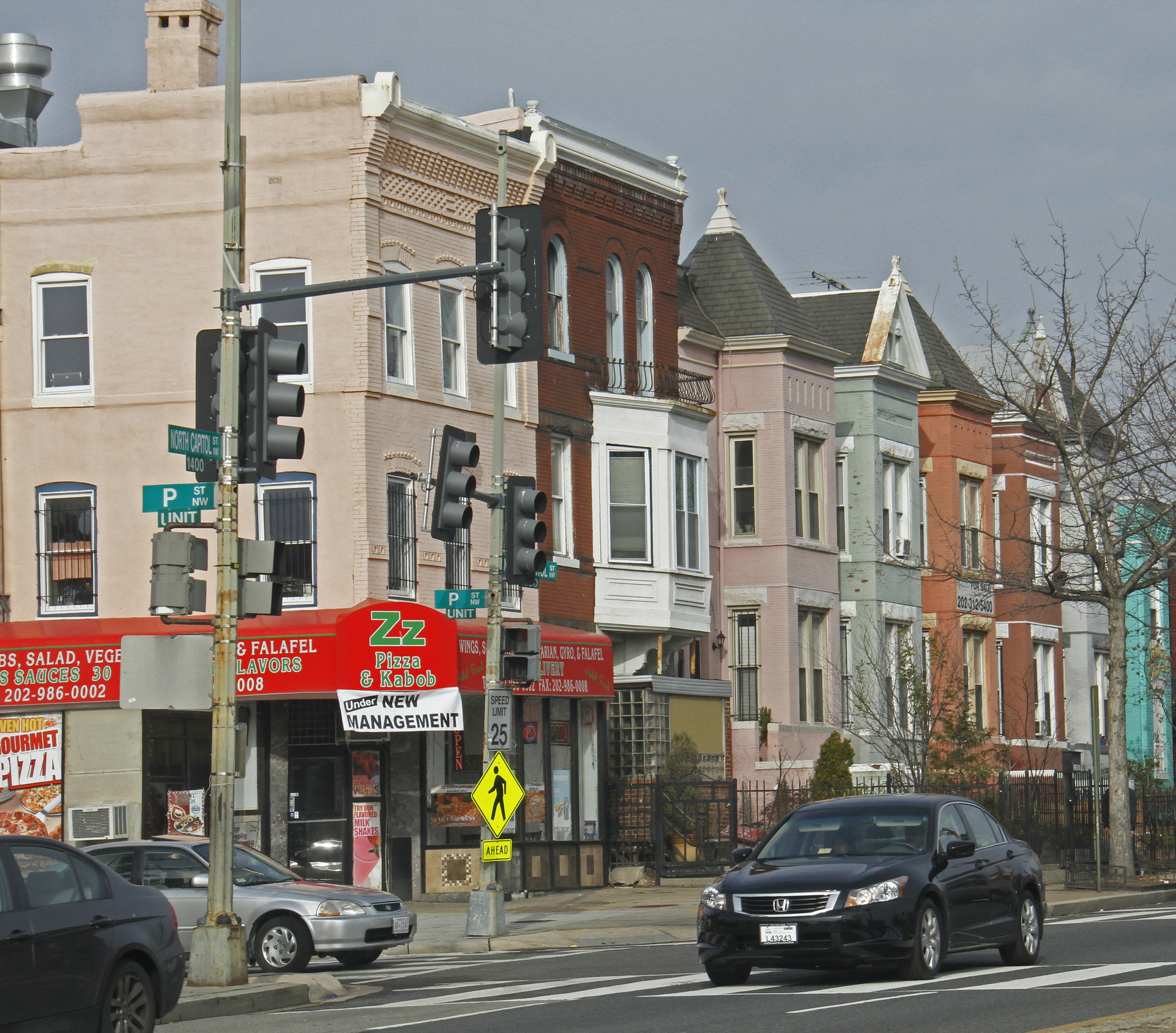
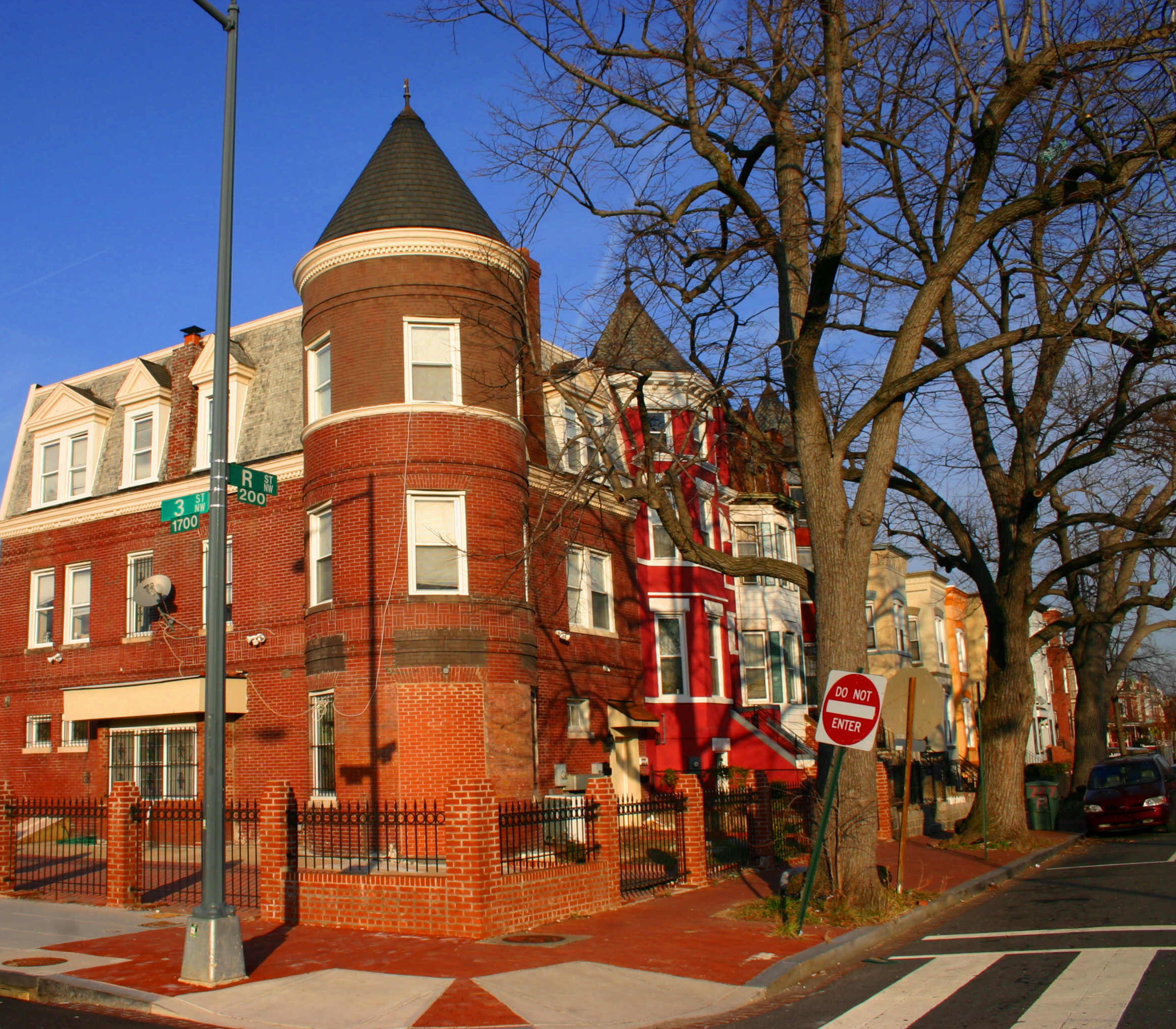
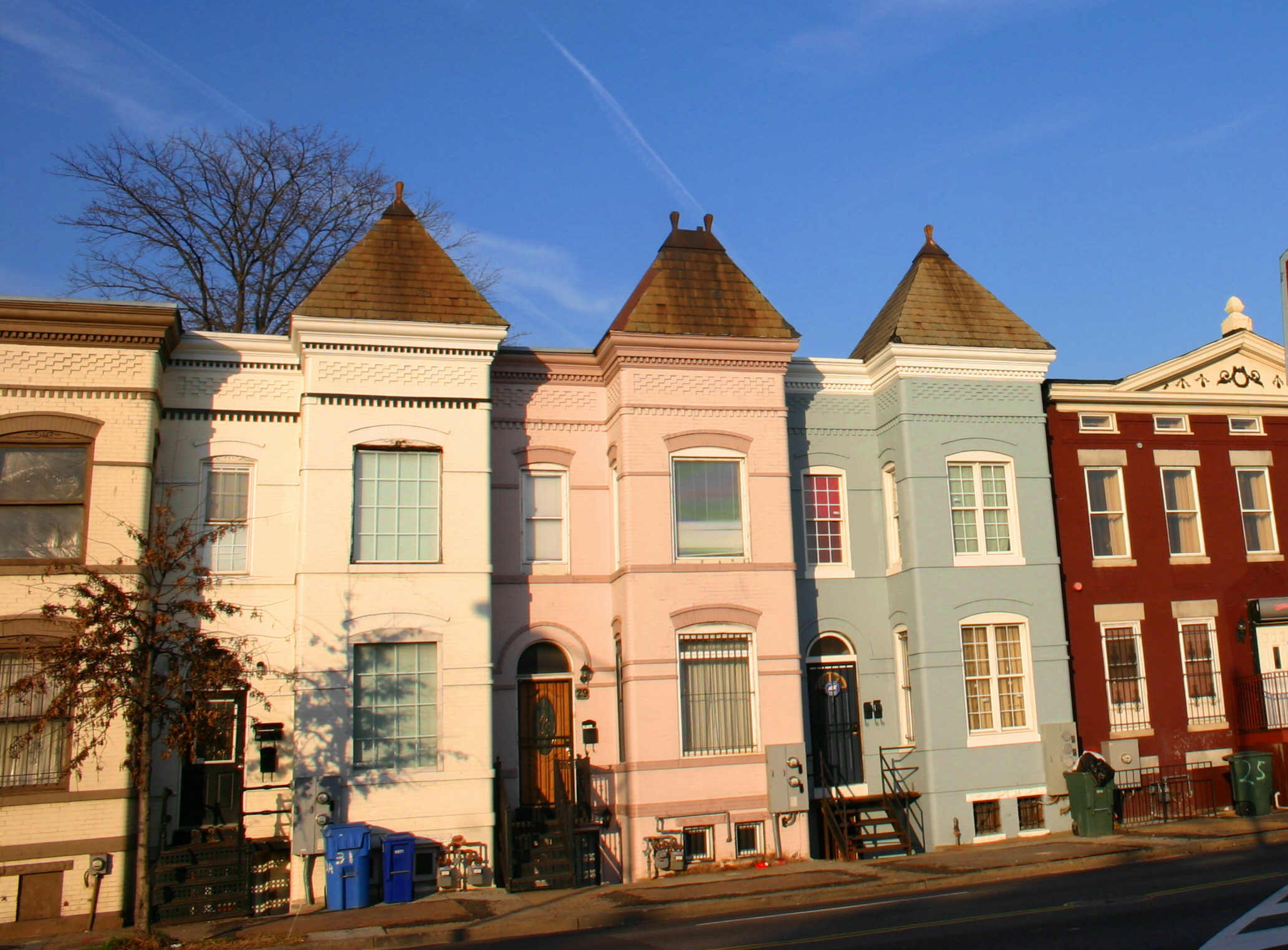
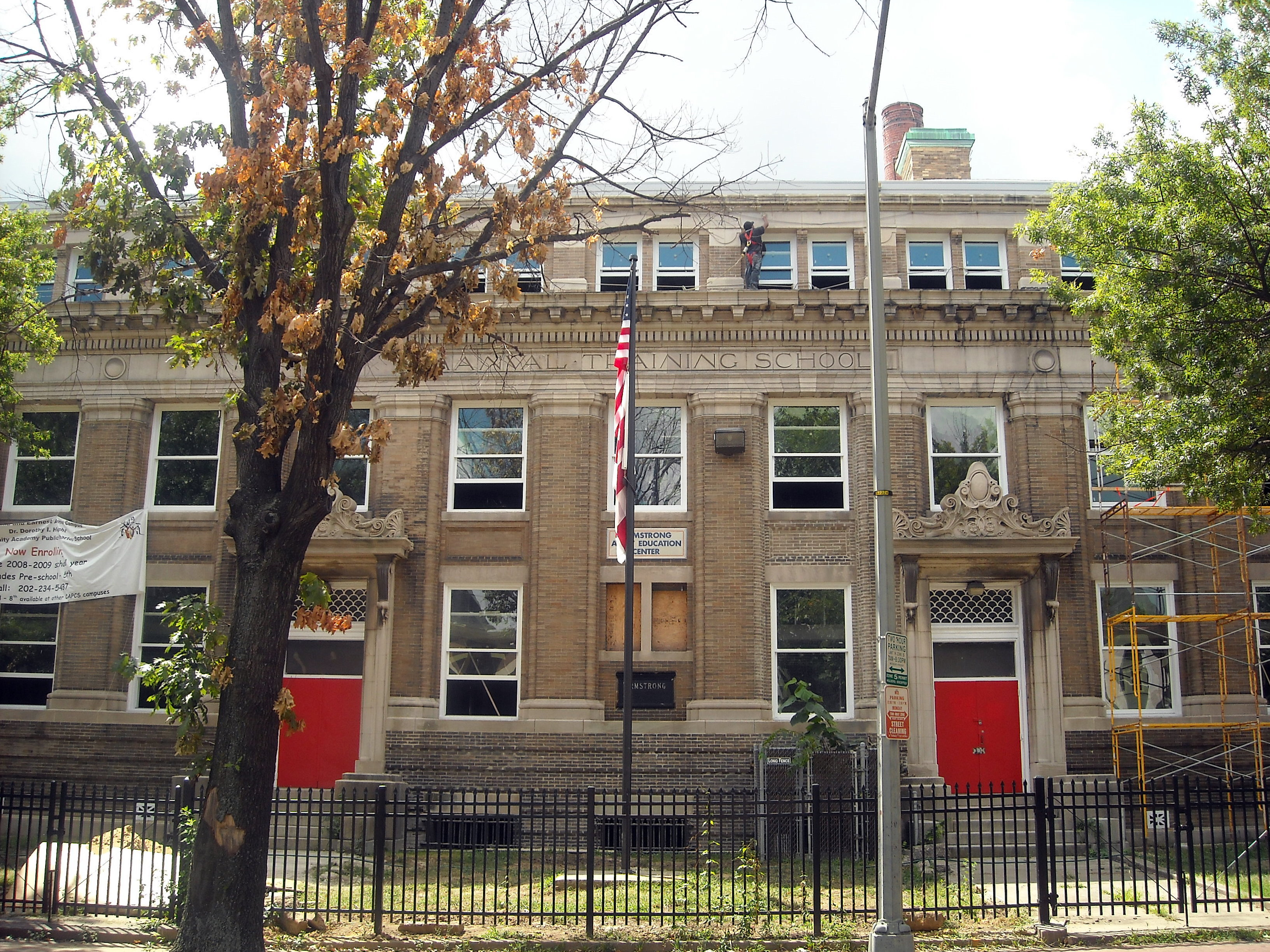

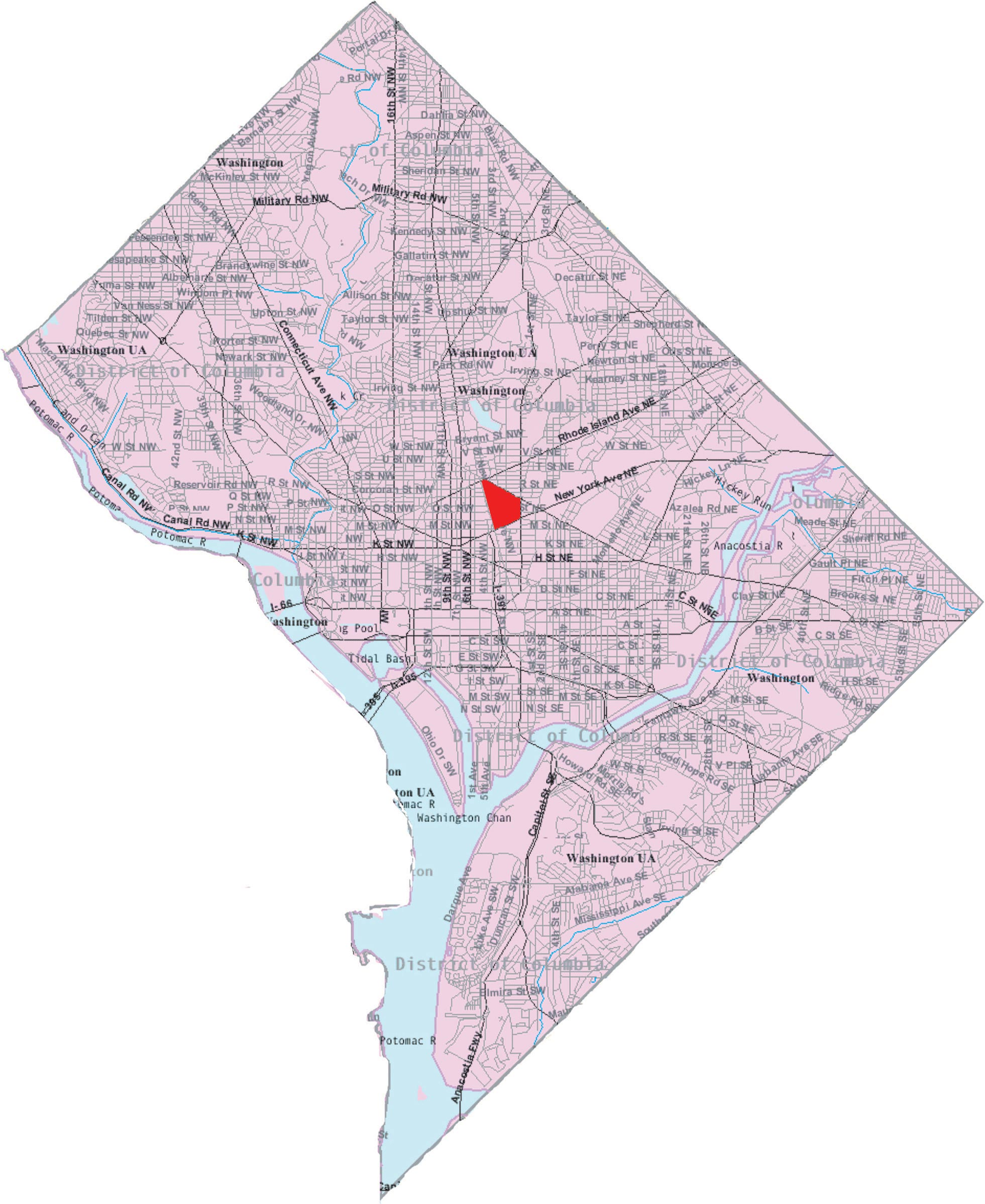
- Truxton Circle within the District of Columbia
- Coordinates: 38.911056°N 77.008972°W
- Country: United States
- District: Washington, D.C.
- Ward: Ward 5

Government
  - Councilmember: Zachary Parker
- Postal code: ZIP code

Truxton Circle, sometimes known as East Shaw, is a neighborhood of Washington, D.C., located in Northwest D.C.

== History ==
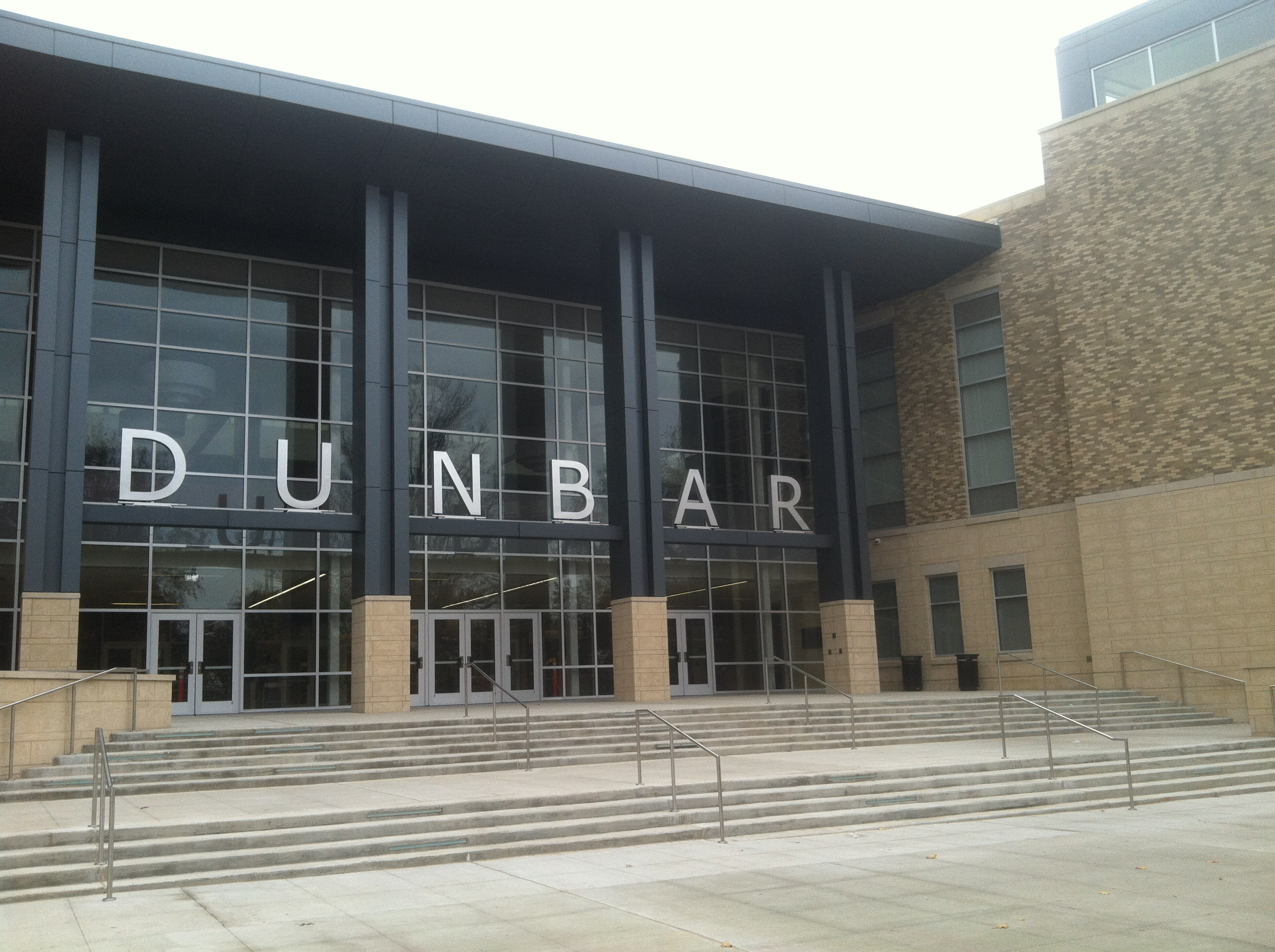
Dunbar High School

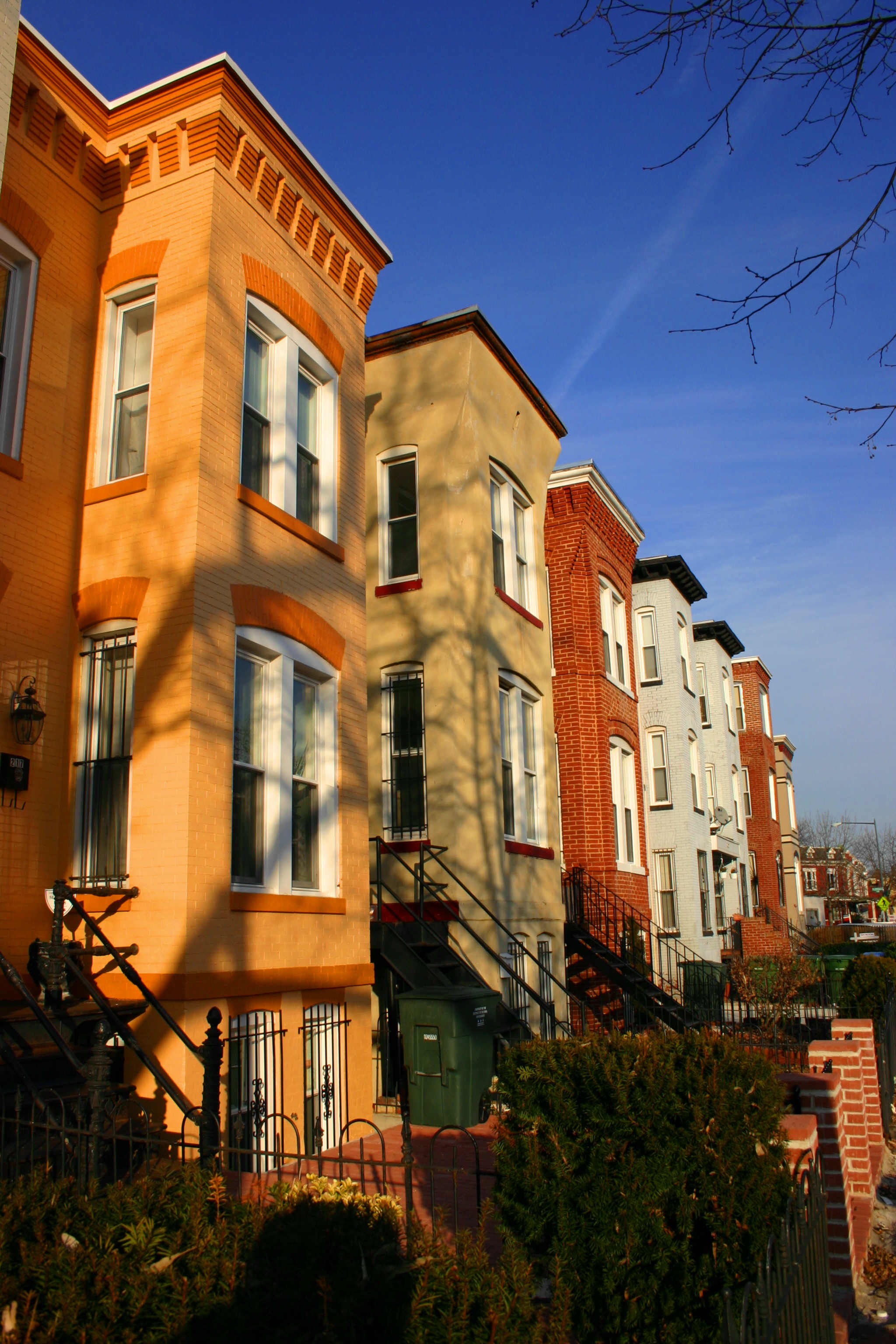
Historic rowhouses

Truxton Circle is named for the former Thomas Truxtun traffic circle, which was constructed at the intersection of Florida Avenue and North Capitol Street around 1900. The circle was named after US Navy Commodore Thomas Truxtun. It was part of the Shaw School Urban Renewal Area, later known as the Shaw neighborhood.

A fountain was moved from the intersection of Pennsylvania Avenue and M Street NW to Truxton Circle in 1901.

A police officer conducted traffic at the traffic circle until a traffic light was installed in 1925.

Because the traffic circle was a site of traffic jams and accidents, it was demolished in 1947 at a cost of $500,000. The adjacent fountain was removed at the same time.

The neighborhood of Truxton Circle contains late 19th-century houses and historical schools, including Armstrong Manual Training School (where Duke Ellington graduated) and the original Dunbar High School, the first public high school for black students in the United States. Along with Armstrong, the former John Mercer Langston School, John Fox Slater Elementary School, and the Margaret Murray Washington School buildings are all listed on the National Register of Historic Places.

== Geography ==
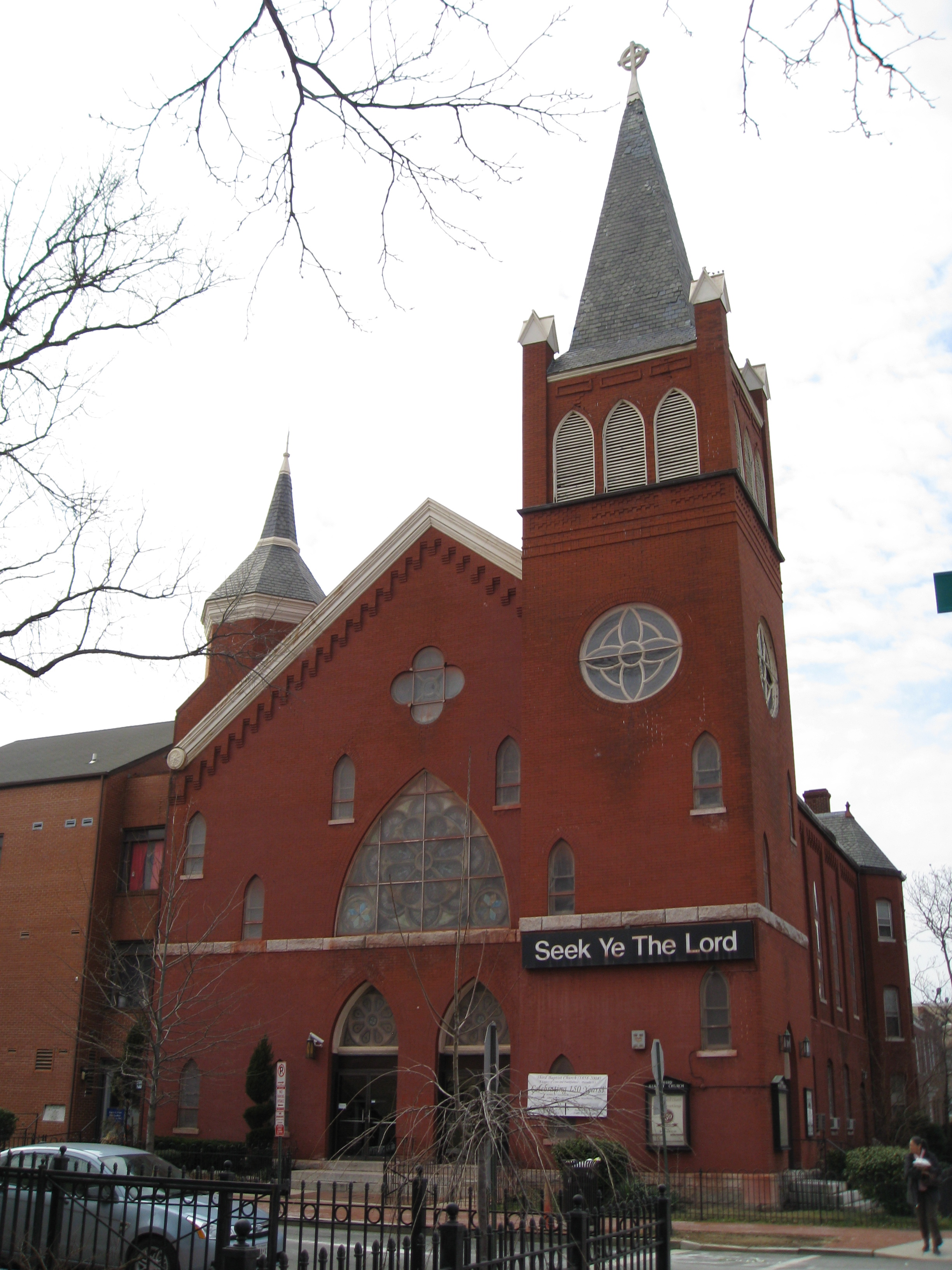
Third Baptist Church

Truxton Circle is bordered by New Jersey Avenue to the west; Florida Avenue to the north; New York Avenue to the south; and North Capitol Street to the east.

It is bordered by the following neighborhoods: to the north by Bloomingdale and LeDroit Park; to the east by Eckington; to the west by Shaw and Mt. Vernon Square Historic District; and to the south by NoMa.

A majority of Truxton Circle is defined as within Ward 5 of the city, with the southeast corner bounded by Kirby St and N St part of Ward 6. After the 2012 redistricting, the Ward 5 portions moved from ANC-5C to ANC-5E. The neighborhood is now served by two Single-Member Districts, 5E05 (south of Q St) and 5E06 (north of Q St and shared with Bloomingdale).

The neighborhood has several parks and playgrounds, such as Truxton Park, which lies at the corner of First Street and Florida Avenue, New York Avenue Playground at the corner of First Street and N Street, and Bundy Playground between O Street and P Street.

== Civic association ==
Truxton Circle is home to two civic associations, the Bates Area Civic Association and the Hanover Civic Association.
