= Fletcher Chapel =

- U.S. National Register of Historic Places
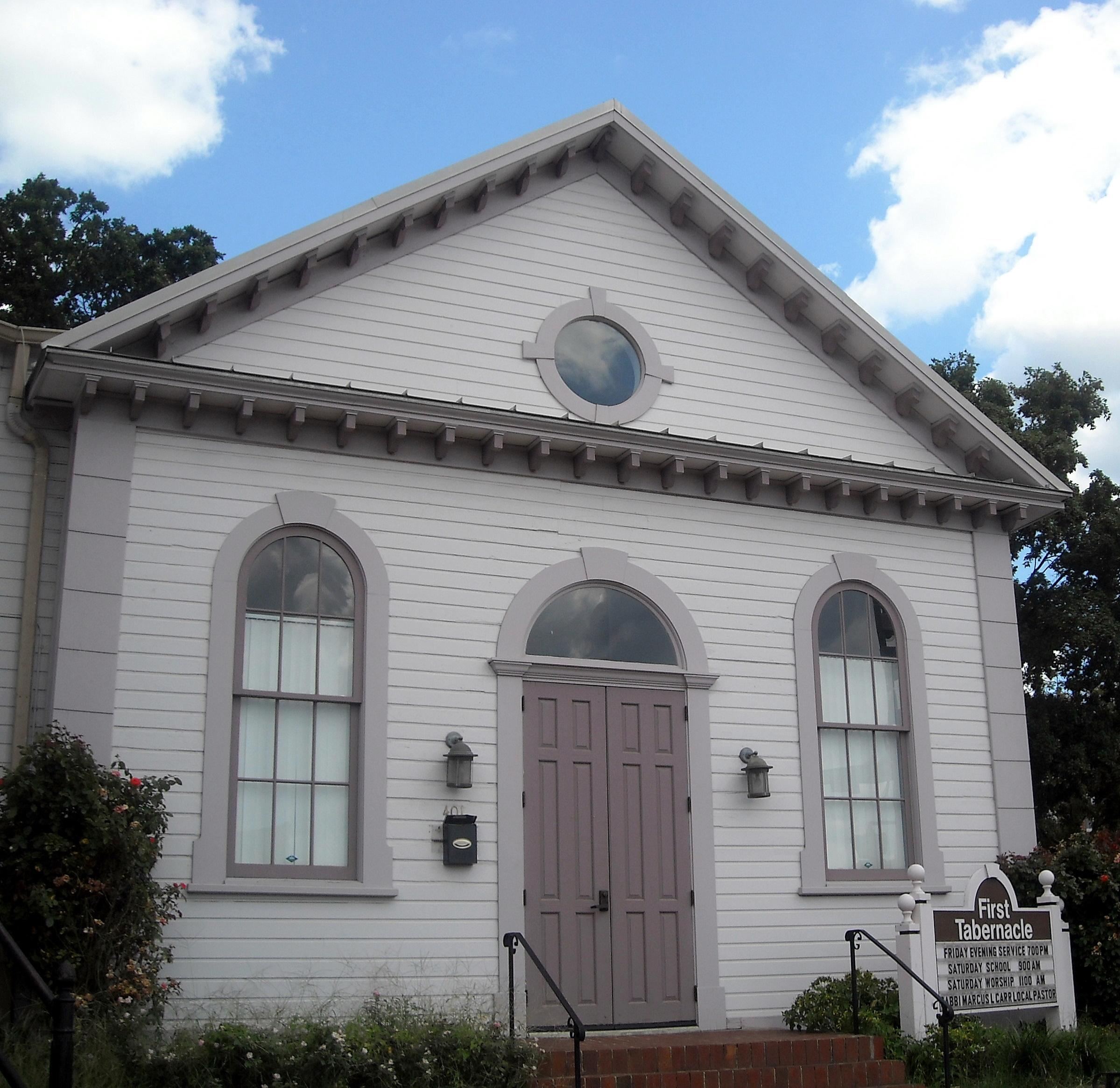
- Fletcher Chapel in 2008

- Location within Central Washington, D.C. Location within the District of Columbia Location within the United States
- Location: 401 New York Ave., Northwest, Washington, D.C.
- Coordinates: 38°54′18″N 77°00′59″W
- Area: less than one acre
- Built: 1854
- Architectural style: Mid 19th Century Revival
- NRHP reference No.: 97000834
- Added to NRHP: August 14, 1997

Fletcher Chapel, also known as Church of God and the Saints of Christ Church, is a historic chapel located in Northwest, Washington, D.C.

It was built in 1854 by the McKendree Methodist Episcopal Church to start a new congregation known as Fletcher Chapel Methodist Episcopal Church. The building was purchased by the Church of God and the Saints of Christ Church in 1904 and added to the National Register of Historic Places in 1997.
