= Lanier Heights =

Neighborhood of Washington, D.C.

Coordinates: 38.9265°N 77.04°W

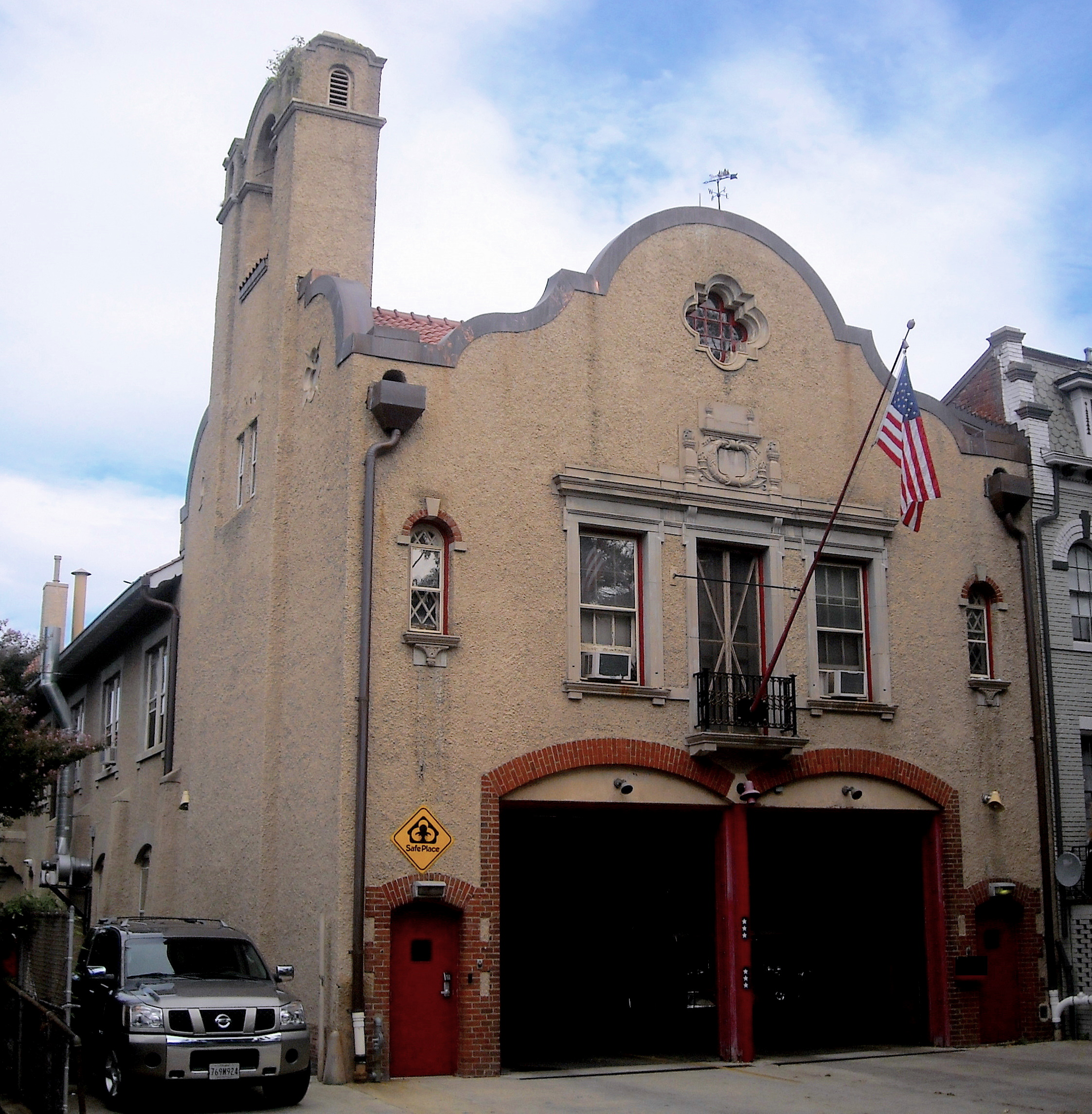
D.C. Fire Department Engine Company 21 at 1763 Lanier Place

Lanier Heights is a small urban neighborhood in the northwest section of Washington, D.C. It was one of the District of Columbia’s early planned subdivisions outside the original City of Washington. Situated two miles north of the White House, Lanier Heights is within the larger and newer neighborhood of Adams Morgan, and is usually considered to be a part of that more prominent locale.

The roughly 50 acres (20.25 hectares) of Lanier Heights are bounded by 16th Street on the east, Adams Mill Road and the National Zoo on the west; Columbia Road to the south, and on the north, Harvard Street, which divides it from the slightly older neighborhood of Mount Pleasant.

Developed mostly between 1900 and 1940, Lanier Heights consists primarily of row houses plus some low- and medium-rise apartment buildings. The architecture is generally typical of the early twentieth century, in a variety of styles, especially Classical Revival. Some apartment houses have distinctive Art Deco designs. The area also contains a commercial stretch of stores on its southern side along Columbia Road.

Lanier Heights is a part of the city's Ward One and part of ANC 1-C of D.C.'s Advisory Neighborhood Commission system.

== History ==
Most of the land beneath Lanier Heights was part of a large, undeveloped piece of property granted in 1714 to John Bradford, who named the tract "Plain Dealing". In 1763, this "Plain Dealing" tract was purchased by Robert Peter of Georgetown. Another small portion of the neighborhood's land came from a large piece of property acquired by James Holmead in 1733. Little activity occurred on the land until after 1800. One early structure in the area was a tavern that James Eslin built in 1826 on property that he had obtained for use as a small farm. The tavern, which quickly became a popular local gambling house, sat near the present-day intersection of 16th Street and Columbia Road. (The Eslin tract would be developed in the 1920s, forming the eastern part of the neighborhood.) But in general, the land that became Lanier Heights was being only lightly used—mostly (if at all) for common farming—until shortly after the end of the Civil War, when Washington started to grow with more vigor. For a time after that war, there was a small quarry, for construction stone and gravel, along Rock Creek at the northern edge of the area.

The formal development of the neighborhood began in 1883 with the creation of the "Lanier Heights Subdivision", a project planned and financed by Elizabeth Lanier Dunn and her husband, William M. Dunn, a retired U.S. Army general. This plan’s somewhat casual street configuration was laid out just a few years before Congress decreed in 1888 that henceforth the rectangular grid system of the central city would be continued throughout the District for all new street construction.

At first the new subdivision grew slowly. Within several years, banker Archibald M. McLachlen and biologist George Brown Goode of the Smithsonian Institution had gained control of most of the tract, intending to make the neighborhood into a residential community for Smithsonian employees and other professionals in Washington. In 1897, the opening of an electric streetcar line on Columbia Road encouraged activity. The 1902-06 construction of The Ontario apartment house attracted more attention and residents. The subdivision developed into a fairly affluent area of families and single people, including professionals, intellectuals, and city workers. Several of the city's first housing cooperatives sprang up in Lanier Heights, including the Stafford and the Lambert (at 1789 and 1791 Lanier Place), developed by William H. Sholes, and 1705 Lanier Place, the first apartment building constructed explicitly as a cooperative.

=== Racism and segregation ===
Lanier Heights was a segregated white neighborhood. In the 1930s, the Kalorama Citizens Association was open only to "every white adult resident" and did not allow black residents to join until at least eight years after Brown v. Board of Education.

In 2016, residents of Lanier Heights, including the Kalorama Citizens Association, successfully advocated for downzoning to prevent other DC residents from neighboring streets moving into their community.
