= Margaret Murray Washington School =

- U.S. National Register of Historic Places
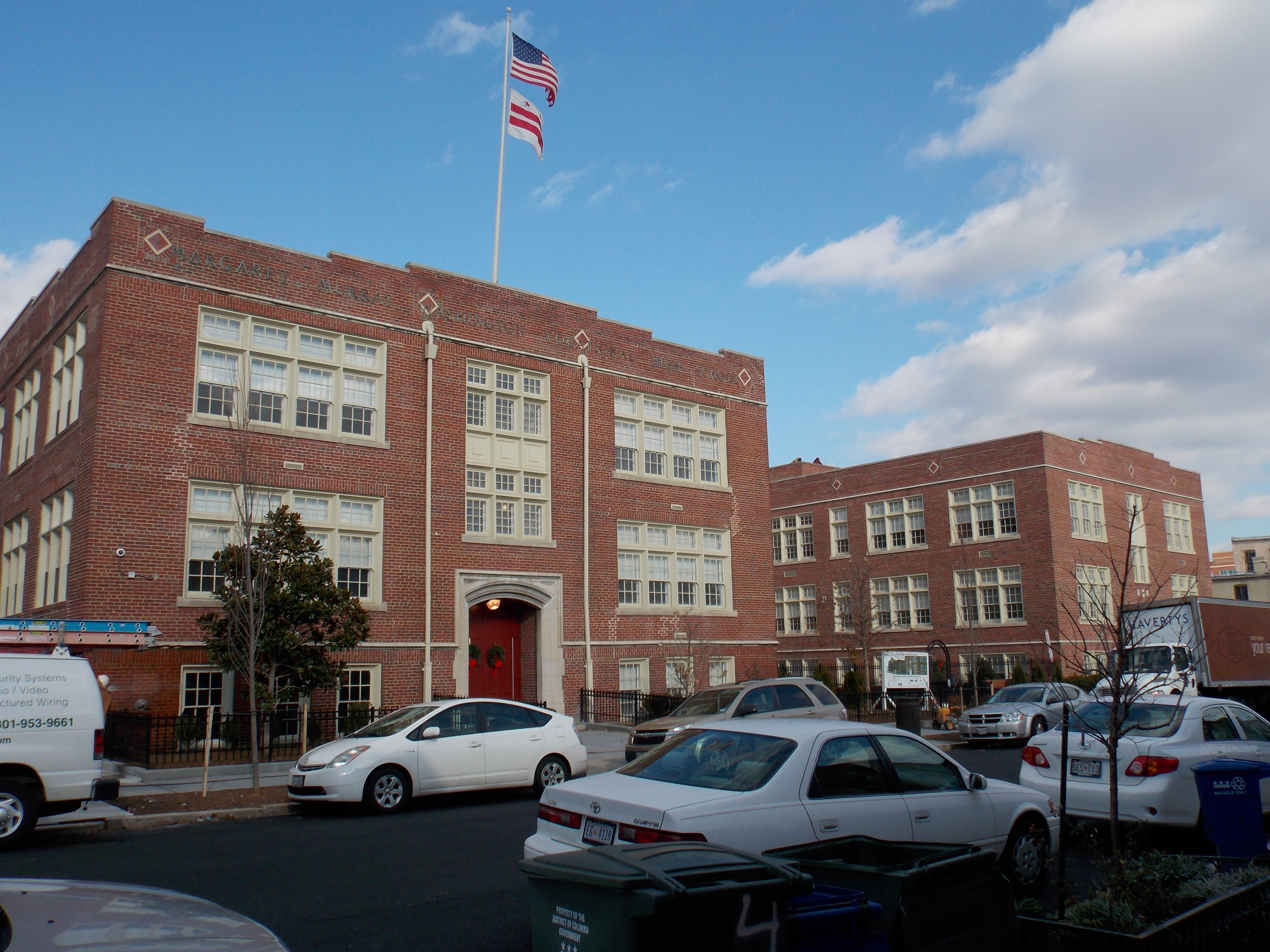
- Margaret Murray Washington School in 2013

- Location within Washington, D.C.
- Location: 27 O St., NW; Washington, D.C.
- Coordinates: 38°54′32″N 77°00′36″W
- Built: 1912
- Architect: Snowden Ashford
- MPS: Public School Buildings of Washington, DC MPS
- NRHP reference No.: 11000843
- Added to NRHP: November 22, 2011

Margaret Murray Washington School, also known as the M.M. Washington Career High School, is a historic structure located in the Truxton Circle neighborhood of Washington, D.C. It was entered in the District of Columbia Inventory of Historic Sites and listed on the National Register of Historic Places in 2011.

== History ==
The main block of the school was opened in 1912 as the O Street Vocational School. It was designed by District of Columbia Municipal Architect Snowden Ashford. The school was renamed for Margaret Murray Washington, the wife of Booker T. Washington, in 1926. She had been a leader of several black feminist organizations and the anti-lynching movement. Additions designed by Albert Harris and Albert Cassell were added in 1928 and 1938 respectively. A gymnasium was added in 1971.

The curriculum provided "manual training for boys and domestic science and art for girls." Nursing was added during World War II and it was accredited afterwards. The school offered instruction to students at area elementary schools as well as high-school-age students who made up its student body.

The building was one of many schools closed in 2008 as part of budget cutting measure. In 2012, work began to turn the school into senior housing which opened in 2013 as the 82 apartment House of Lebanon.

== See also ==
- John Fox Slater Elementary School building was annexed to Washington Career High School from 1951 to 1958
