= Petworth (Washington, D.C.) =

- Neighborhood of Washington, D.C.
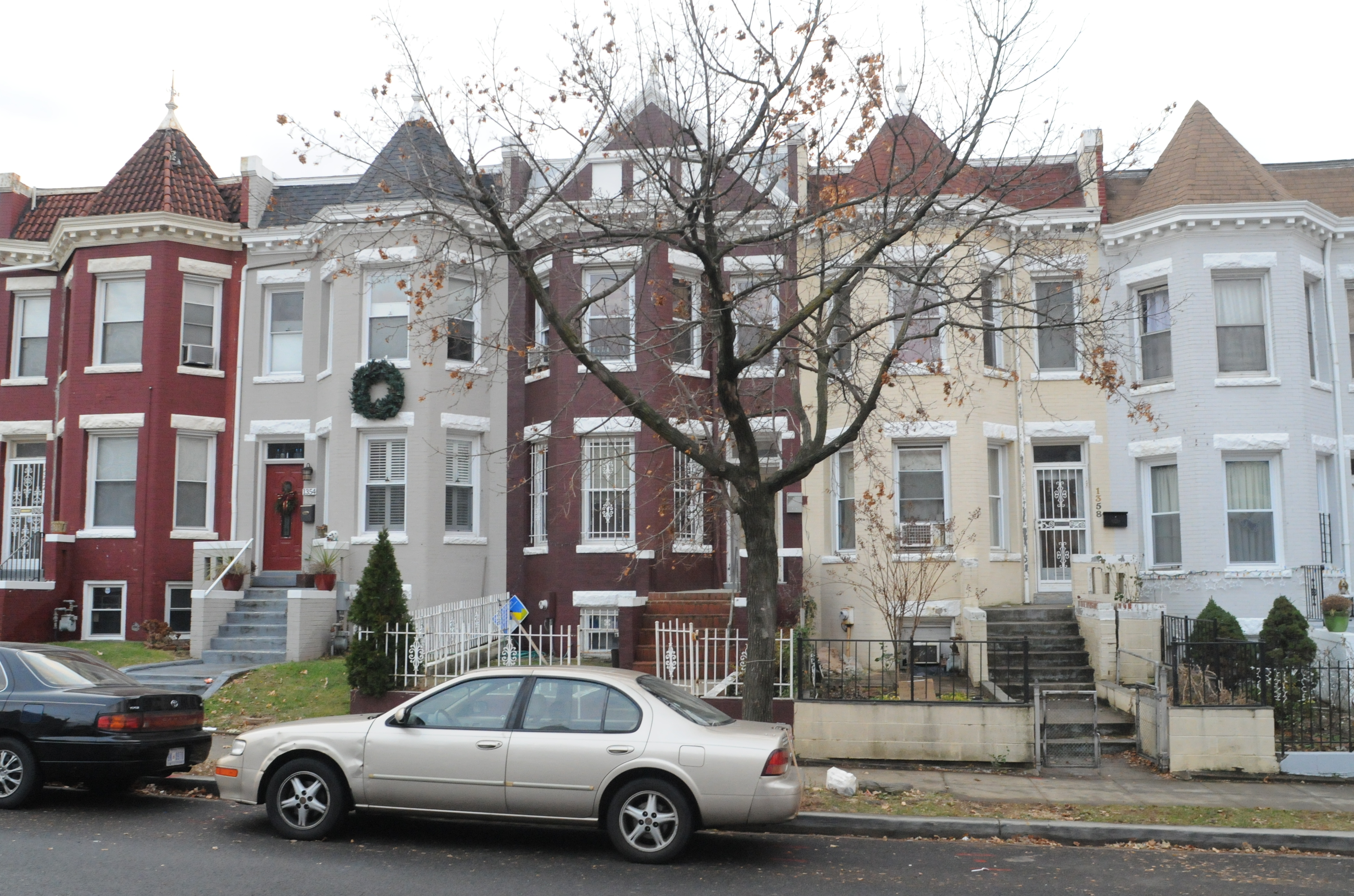
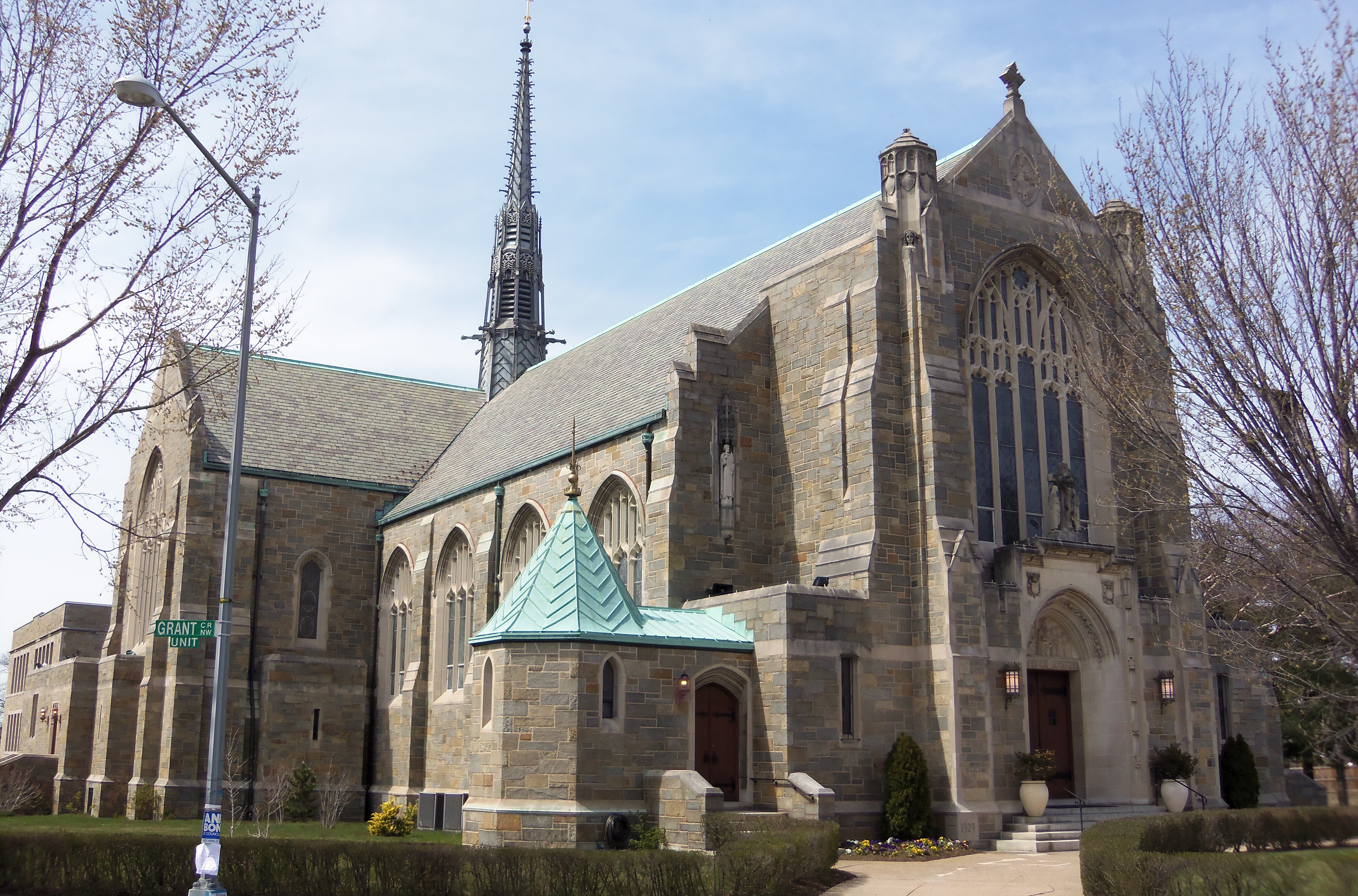
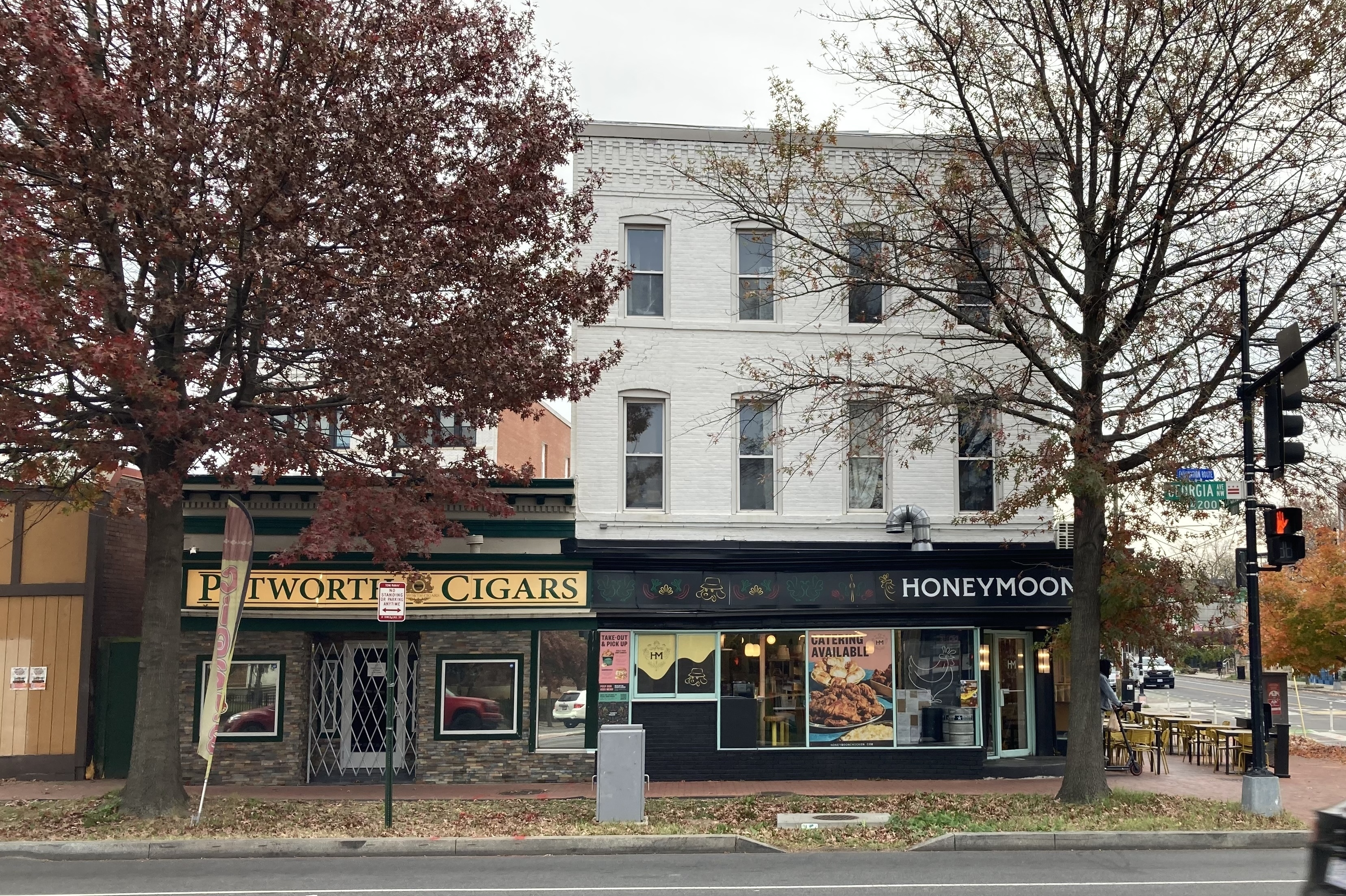
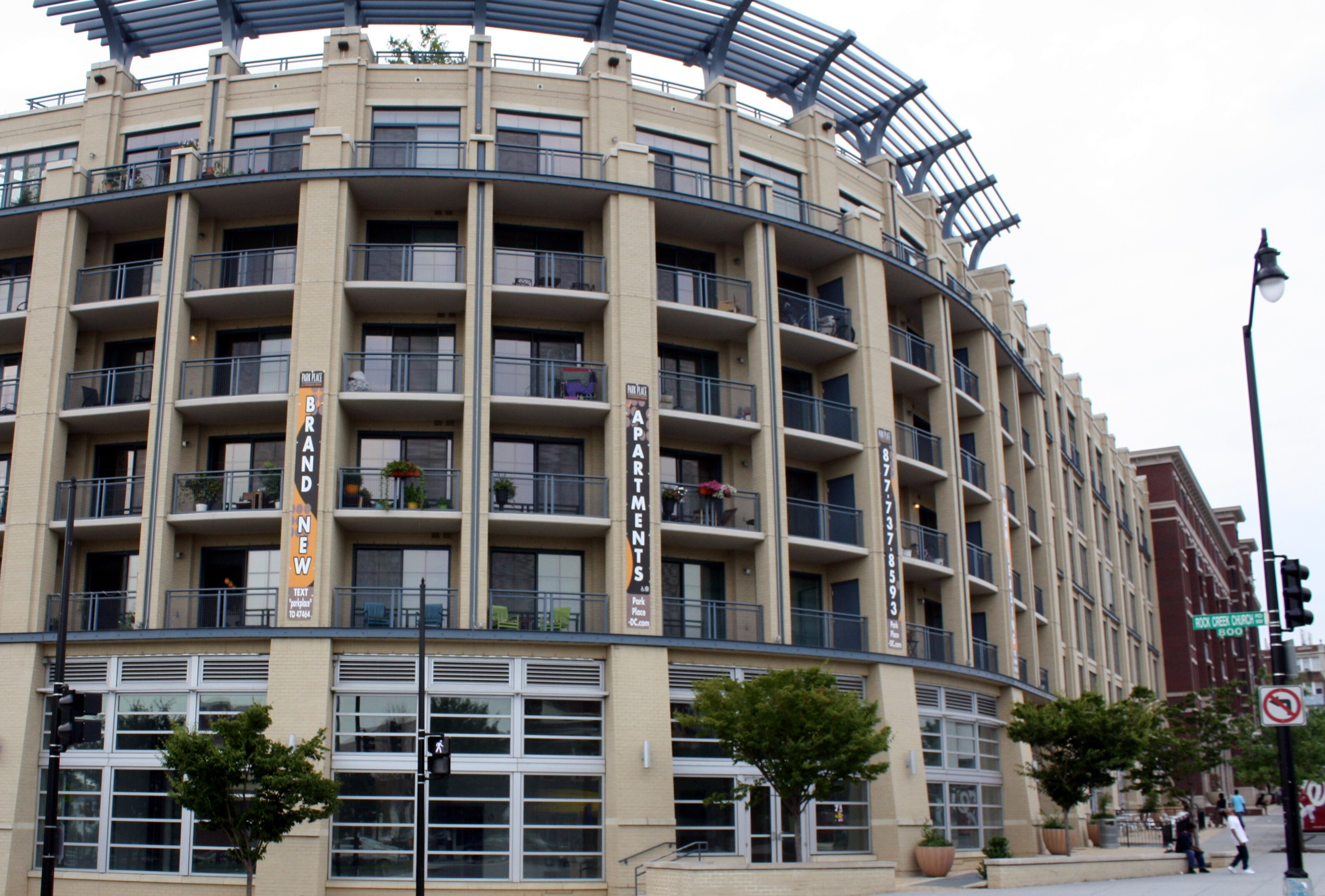
- Top: historic rowhomes (left) and St. Gabriel Church on Grant Circle (right); bottom: Upshur Street (left) and Georgia Avenue (right).

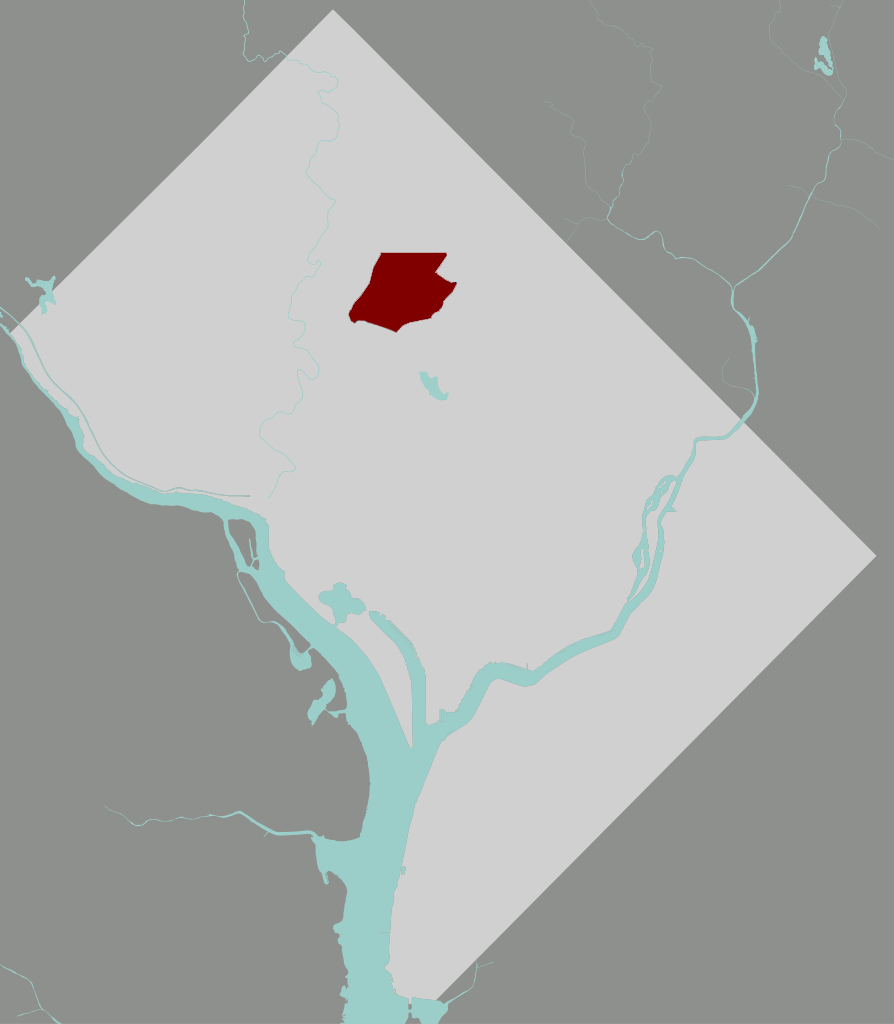
- Map of Washington, with Petworth highlighted
- Coordinates: 38.942161°N 77.025525°W
- Country: United States
- District: Washington, D.C.
- Quadrant: Northwest
- Ward: 4
- ANC: 4C & 4D

Government
  - Councilmember: Janeese Lewis George

Population
  - Total: 19,195

Demographics
  - White: 30%
  - Black: 35%
  - Hispanic: 26%
  - Asian: 3%
  - Other: 6%
- ZIP Code: 20010, 20011
- Area code: 202

Petworth is a neighborhood of Washington, D.C., located in Northwest D.C. While largely residential, Petworth is home to a notable commercial corridor of shops and restaurants, primarily along Georgia Avenue and Upshur Street, as well as a portion of 14th Street. The neighborhood is accessible via the Georgia Ave–Petworth station on the Green Line, and Yellow Line of the Washington Metro.

== History ==
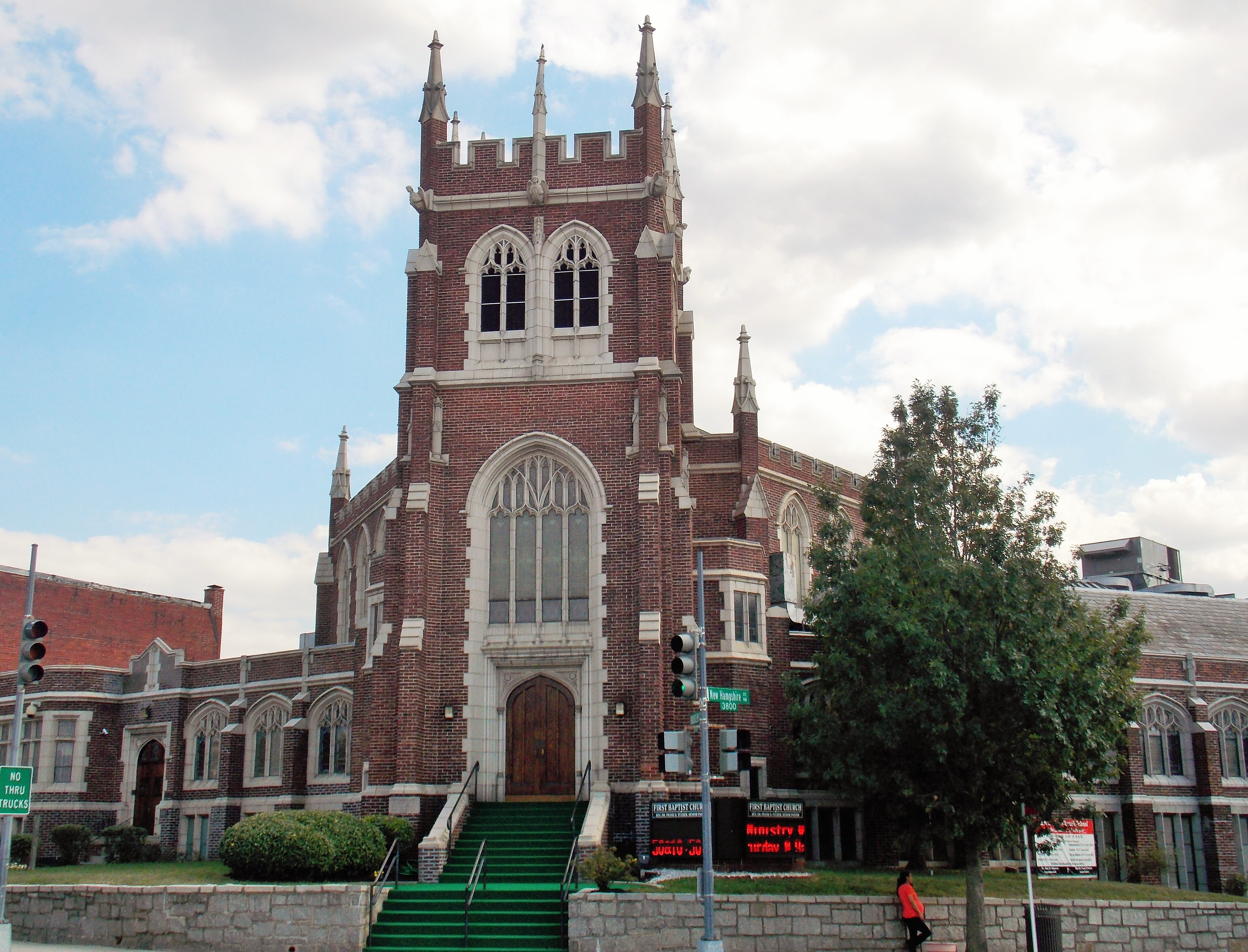
First Baptist Church (formerly Wallace Memorial United Presbyterian Church), built in 1915

Roosevelt High School, b. 1932

Petworth was the name of the 205-acre country estate of John Tayloe III, of Mount Airy and The Octagon House, likely named for the ancient town of Petworth in West Sussex, England. Here he kept horses for the races at the Washington Jockey Club, a club he founded with Charles Carnan Ridgely of Hampton.

The estate, located at the northeast corner of 7th Street Pike (later known as Brightwood Avenue, now Georgia Avenue) and Rock Creek Church Road, was bequeathed to his son Benjamin Ogle Tayloe. In 1887, it was sold by Tayloe's heirs to developers for $107,000. In 1889, developers registered “Petworth” with the District surveyor as a 387-acre plat of subdivision containing the former Tayloe estate and the Marshal Brown estate. In 1893, additional real estate deals formed "West Petworth," from land west of Brightwood Avenue, including the Ruppert Farm, which was sold for $142,680, the 20-acre Burnaby tract, and a 14-acre property known as Poor Tom’s Last Shaft. In 1900, Henry J. Ruppert sold an additional 31.7 acres west of Brightwood and Iowa Avenues and south of Utica Street (now Allison Street) to the District for a proposed municipal hospital.

In the early 1900s, the expansion of a streetcar line along Georgia Avenue to the border of Silver Spring, Maryland, made Petworth more accessible.

Many of the thousands of similar brick row houses in the neighborhood were constructed by Morris Cafritz and by D.J. Dunigan Company in the 1920s–1930s. Dunigan donated the land that became the site for St. Gabriel's Church and School next to Grant Circle.

== Demographics ==
Year	Total ANC-4C population	% Children	% Black	% White	% Hispanic	% Asian/P.I.	Average family income	Median home sales price
1990	19,875	19%	88%	6%	6%	%	$77,679	$166,000
2000	19,519	23%	72%	6%	20%	1%	$85,209	$177,000
2005	19,540	17%	63%	14%	20%	1%	$92,009	$491,000
2010	20,330	19%	57%	15%	26%	2%	Not Avail.	$460,000

== Education ==
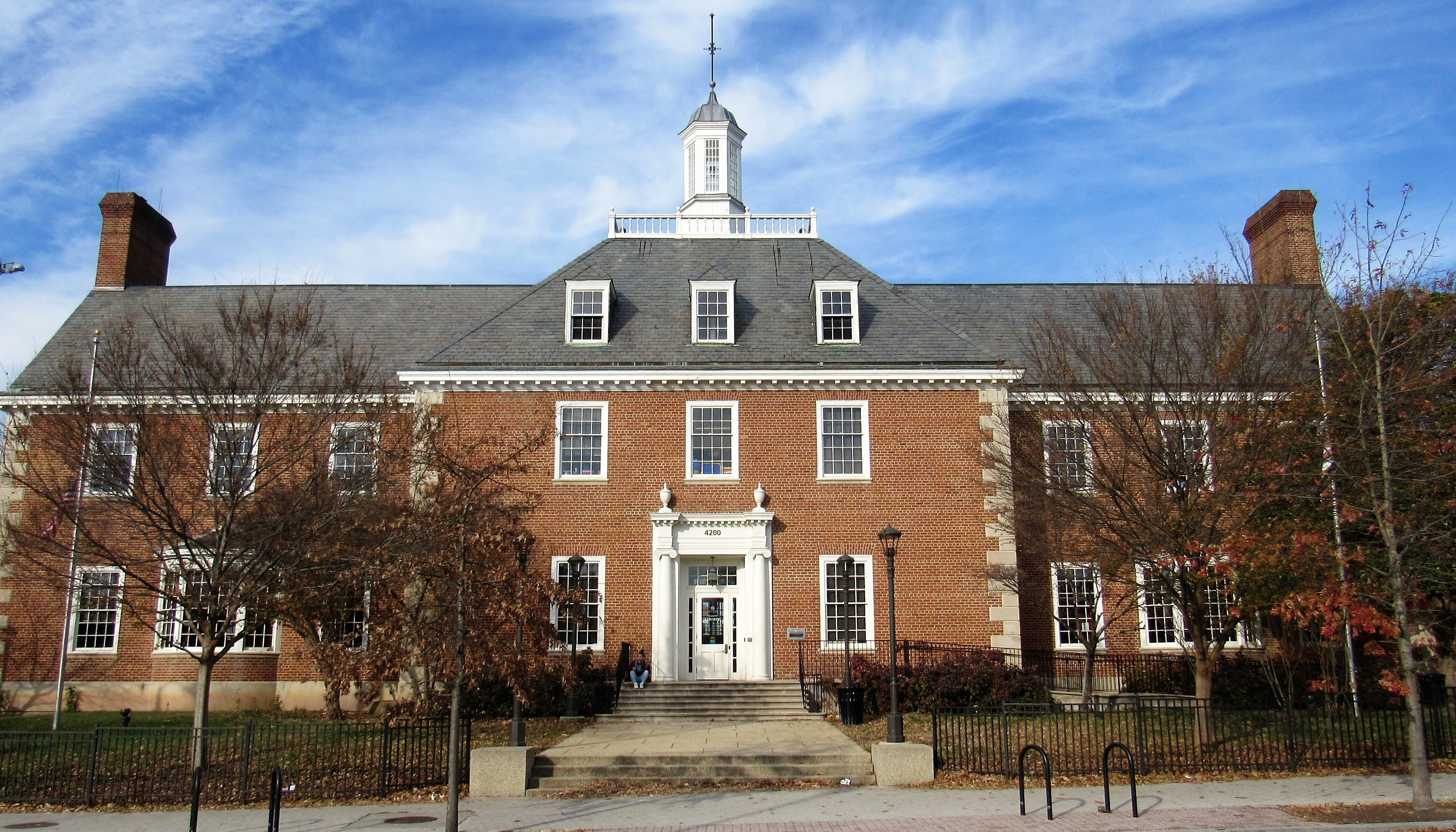
Petworth Neighborhood Library

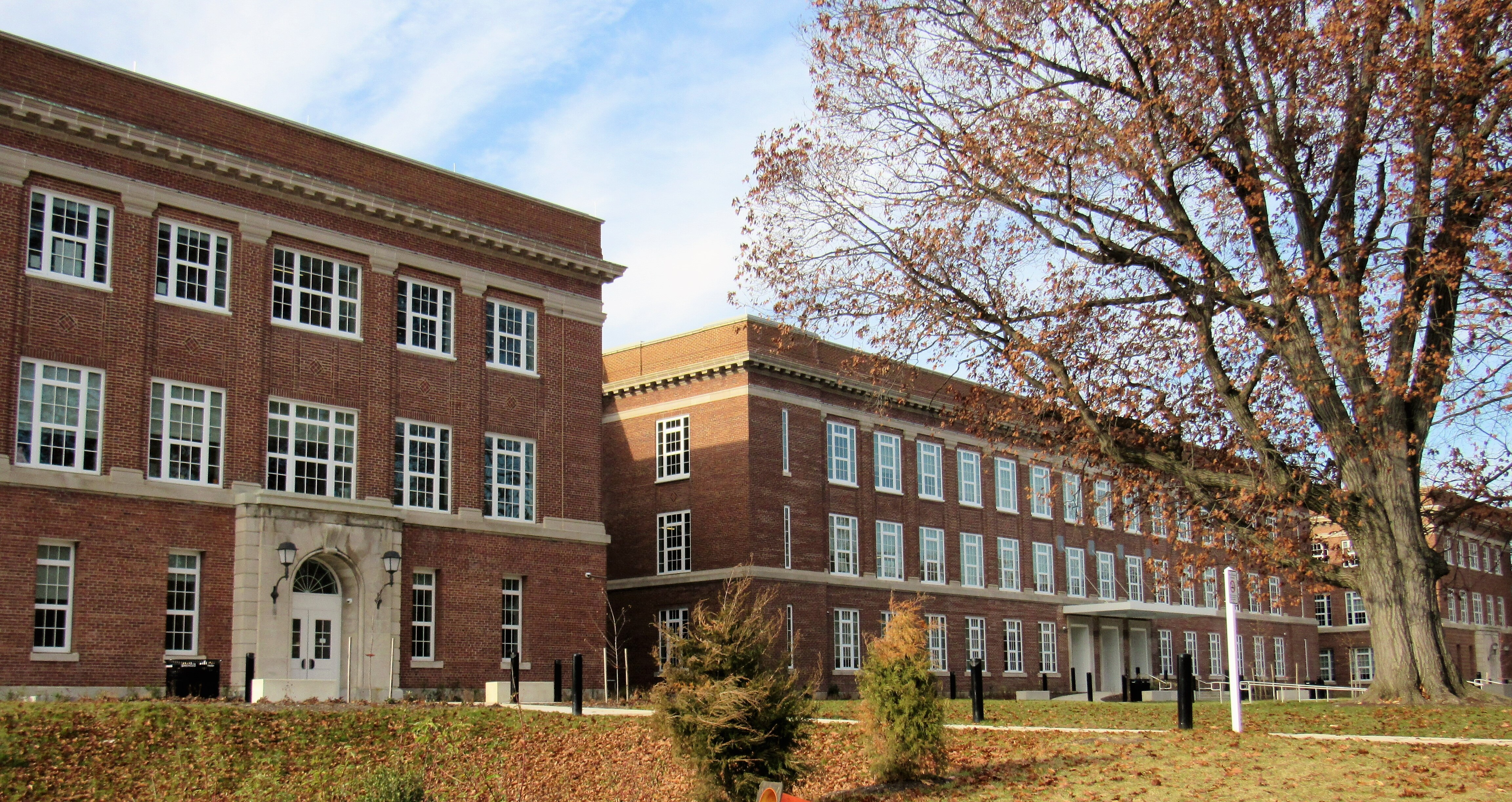
MacFarland Middle School

Petworth Neighborhood Library opened in 1939 at the corner of Georgia Ave. NW, Kansas Ave. NW, and Upshur St. NW. In addition to providing access to DC Public Library general circulation items, the library’s collection includes a Spanish Language collection, job and employment literature, and Adult Basic Education materials.

Petworth is served by District of Columbia Public Schools (DCPS). Roosevelt Senior High School enrolls students in ninth through 12th grade. Truesdell Education Campus enrolls in grades pre-kindergarten through eighth grade. Powell enrolls students in pre-kindergarten through fifth grade.

Charter schools

- Breakthrough Montessori Public Charter School
- Bridges Public Charter School
- Center City Public Charter School – Petworth Campus
- E.L. Haynes Public Charter School
- Washington Latin Public Charter School

== Economy ==
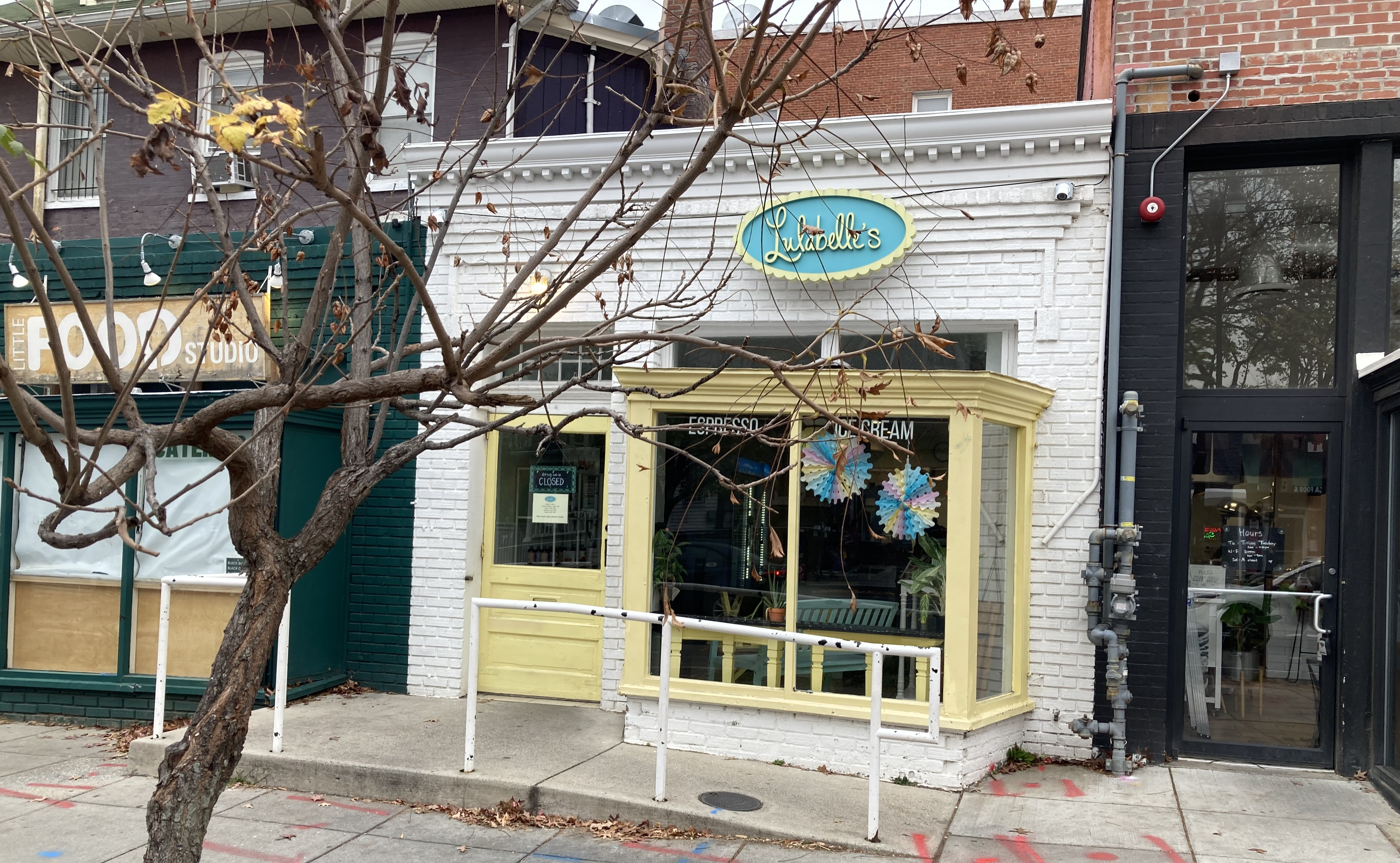
Shops on Upshur Street

In the 2000s, Petworth experienced growth in its commercial corridor. There are restaurants and bars in the neighborhood though several restaurants on Upshur Street closed in late 2018.

In recent years, the neighborhood has also become known for Room 808, a minority-owned and comedian-operated comedy club located at 808 Upshur Street NW. Founded in 2021 by comedian Martin Amini, a DMV native, Room 808 has been recognized by The Washington Post as one of the best comedy clubs in the D.C. area. The venue regularly features a mix of local and national performers and was among the first in the region to host stand-up comedy shows in Spanish.

Local events

- Upshur Street Art and Craft Fair
- Petworth Community Market, a farmer's market, is held along 9th Street between Upshur and Taylor Streets weekly on Saturdays from May through October.
- Petworth Jazz Project is a free music series of jazz performances held at Petworth Park at 8th and Taylor Streets from May through September.
- Celebrate Petworth, a street fair.

== Landmarks ==
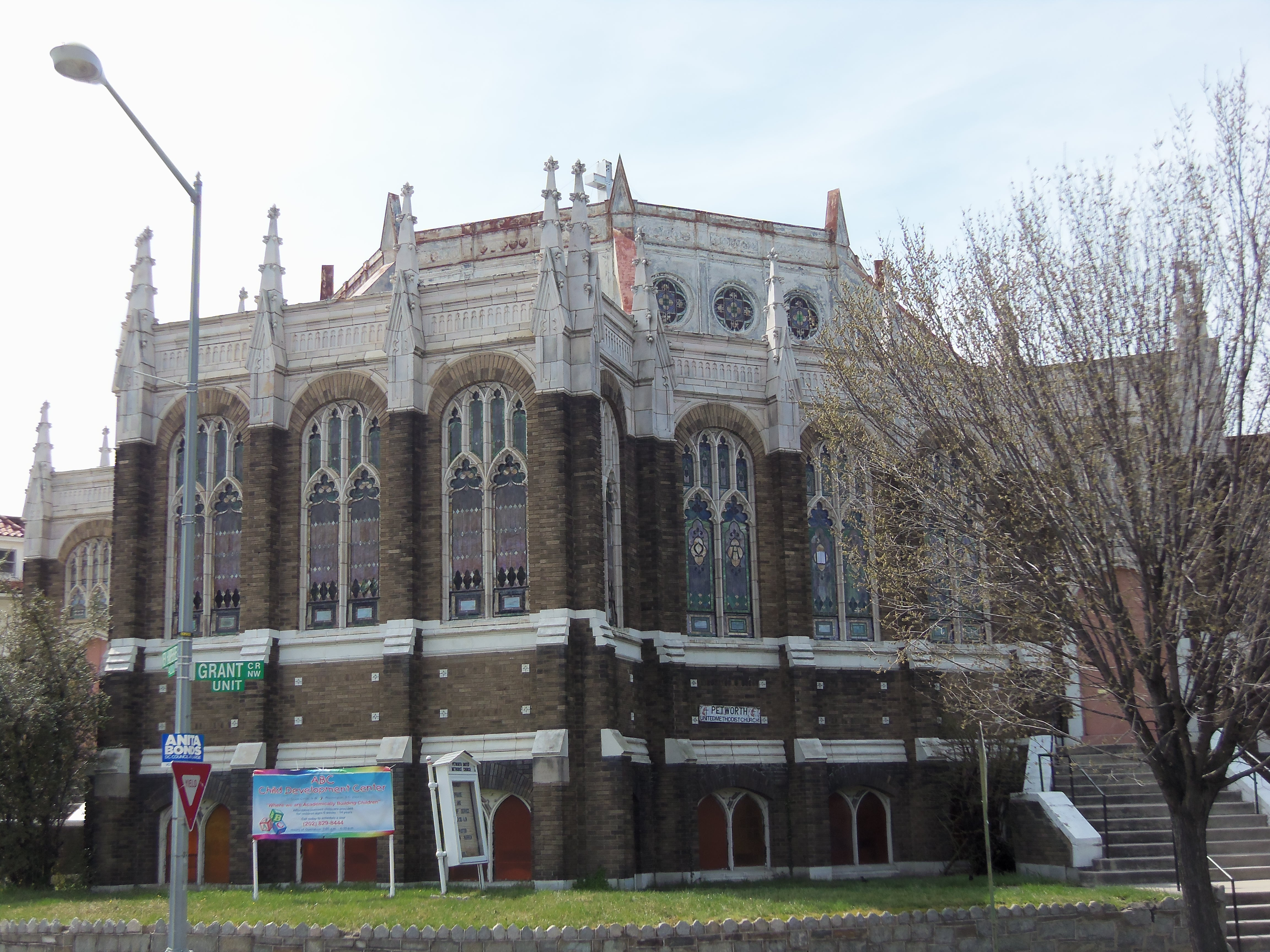
Petworth Methodist Church, b. 1916

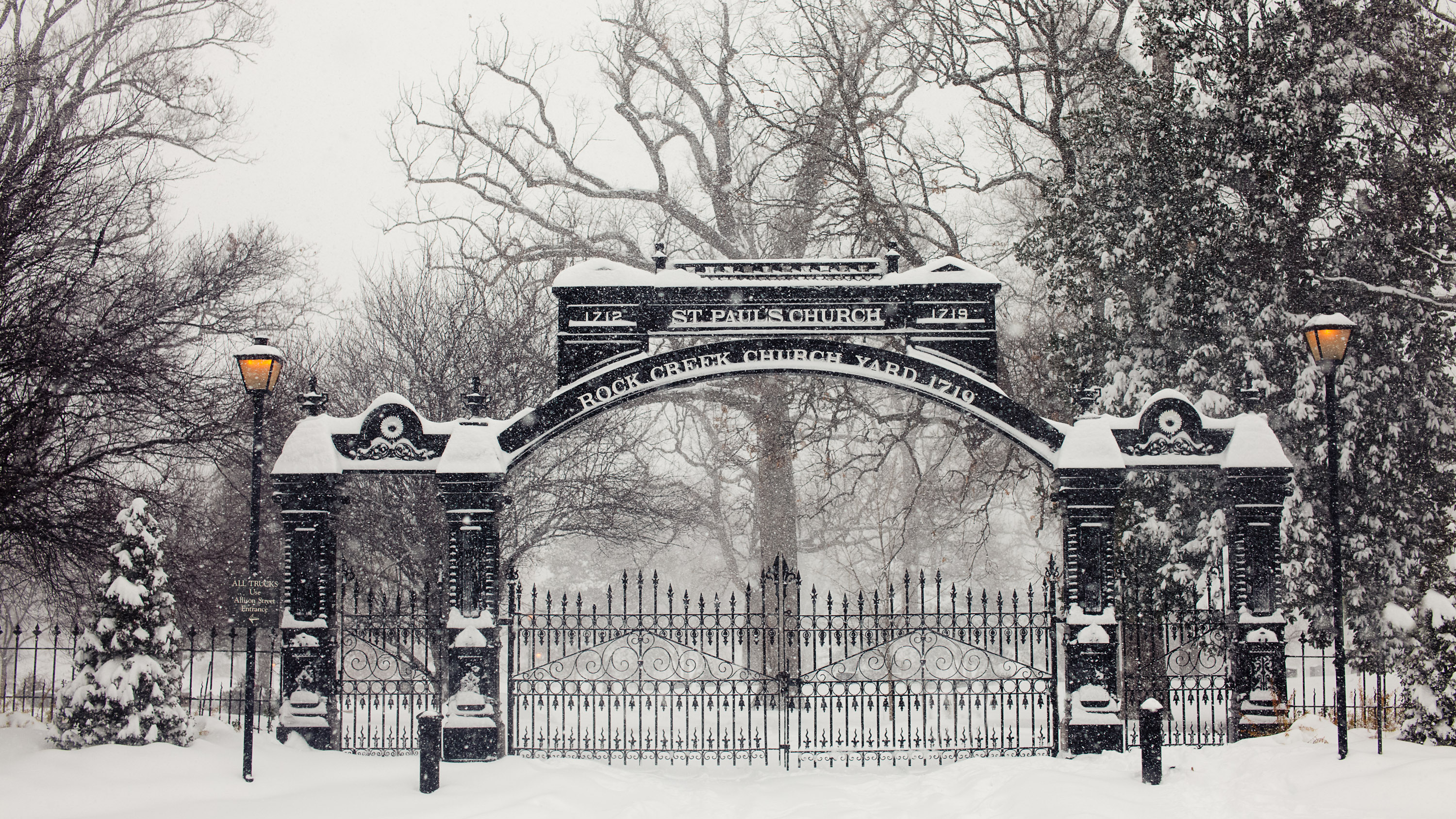
Entrance to Rock Creek Cemetery

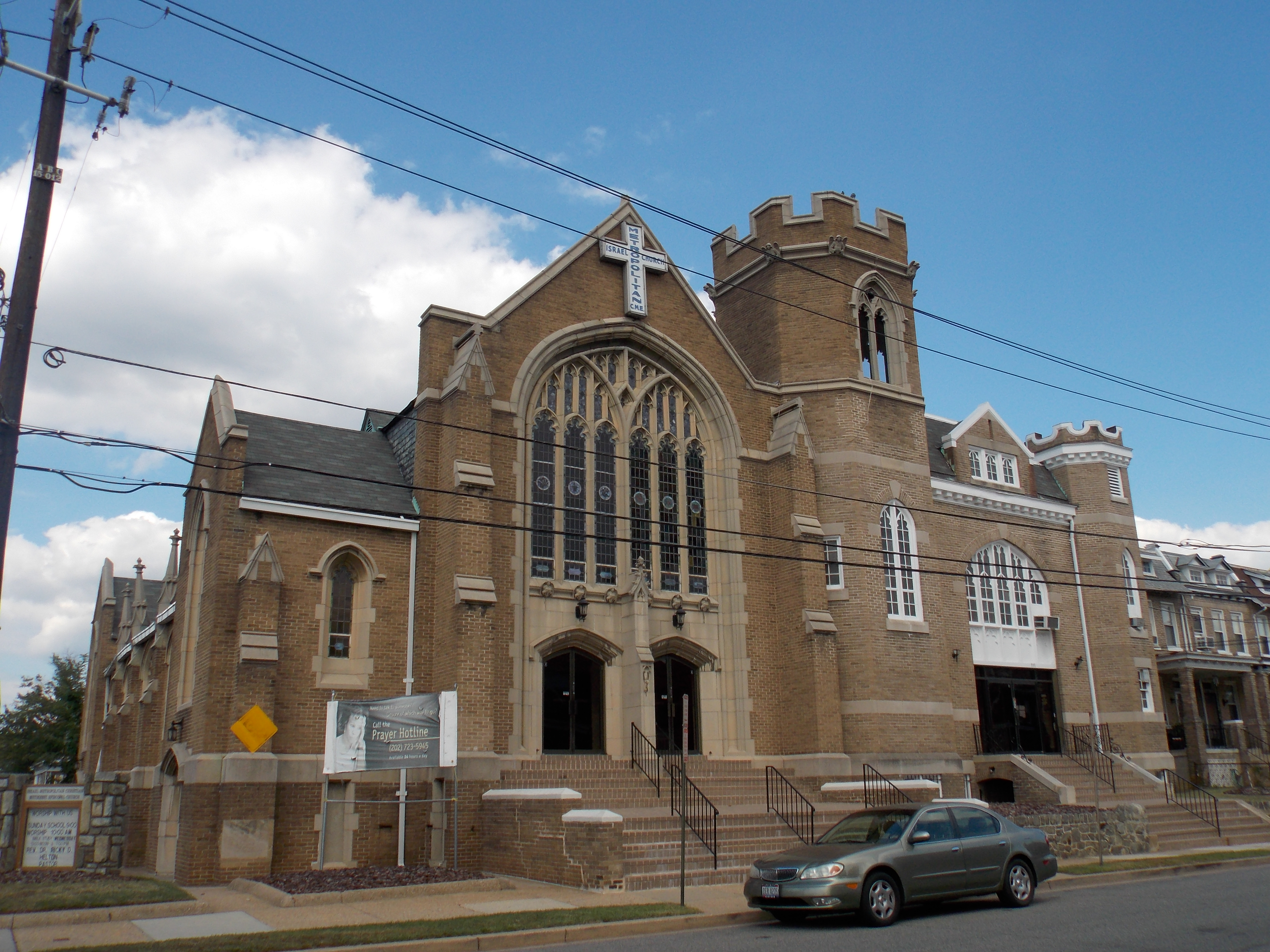
Israel Metropolitan Christian Methodist Episcopal Church

- Adams Memorial by Augustus Saint-Gaudens (Titled: "The Peace of God." Also known as "Grief"), Rock Creek Cemetery, Webster Street and Rock Creek Church Road, NW
- Billy Simpson's House of Seafood and Steaks, 3815 Georgia Avenue, NW
- Engine Company 24, 3670 New Hampshire Avenue, NW (originally 3702 Georgia Avenue, NW)
- Lincoln Cottage (President Lincoln's Cottage at the Soldiers' Home) (Formerly, Corn Rigs, Anderson House), Soldiers' Home Grounds, Rock Creek Church Road and Upshur Street, NW
- Petworth Gardens (Also known as Webster Garden Apartments), 124, 126, 128, and 130 Webster St., NW
- Rock Creek Cemetery, Webster Street and Rock Creek Church Road, NW
- St. Paul's Church (Rock Creek Parish), Rock Creek Church Road & Webster Street, NW
- Soldiers’ Home National Historic Site (United States Military Asylum), Rock Creek Church Road & Upshur Street, NW

=== Public art ===
- "The American Panorama," 1934, by Nelson Rosenberg. Fresco. Originally located in the cafeteria at Roosevelt Senior High School, uncovered during a renovation in 2013, and now on display in the high school’s main lobby.
- "(Here I Stand) In the Spirit of Paul Robeson," 2001, by Allen Uzikee Nelson. Sculpture. Located at the corner of Georgia and Kansas Avenues NW.
- "Homage to a Community," 2002, by Andrew Reid and Carlos Alves. Mural and ceramic tile frieze. Located inside the metro station.
- "New Leaf," 2007, by Lisa Scheer. Sculpture. Located outside the metro station at Georgia and New Hampshire Avenues.
- Chuck Brown mural, 2012 (Destroyed in 2020), by MacFarland Middle School students led by art teacher Charles Jean-Pierre. Mural. Formerly located on the exterior of 3701 New Hampshire Ave NW
- Untitled Ramones mural, 2018. Located on the 2nd Street NW wall of Slash Run, 201 Upshur Street NW.
- "SHOWOFF," 2013, by Cita Sadeli (Also known as Chelove). Mural. Located on the southwest corner of Taylor Street NW and Georgia Avenue NW.
- Petworth mural, 2015, by Juan Pineda. Mural Located in the alley on the 800 block of Upshur Street NW between Willow and Petworth Citizen.
- Senhora dos Tempos or "Lady of Time," 2016, by Robezio Marqs and Tereza Dequinta (known as the "Acidum Project"). Mural Located at Kansas Avenue and Taylor Street NW.

== Notable residents ==
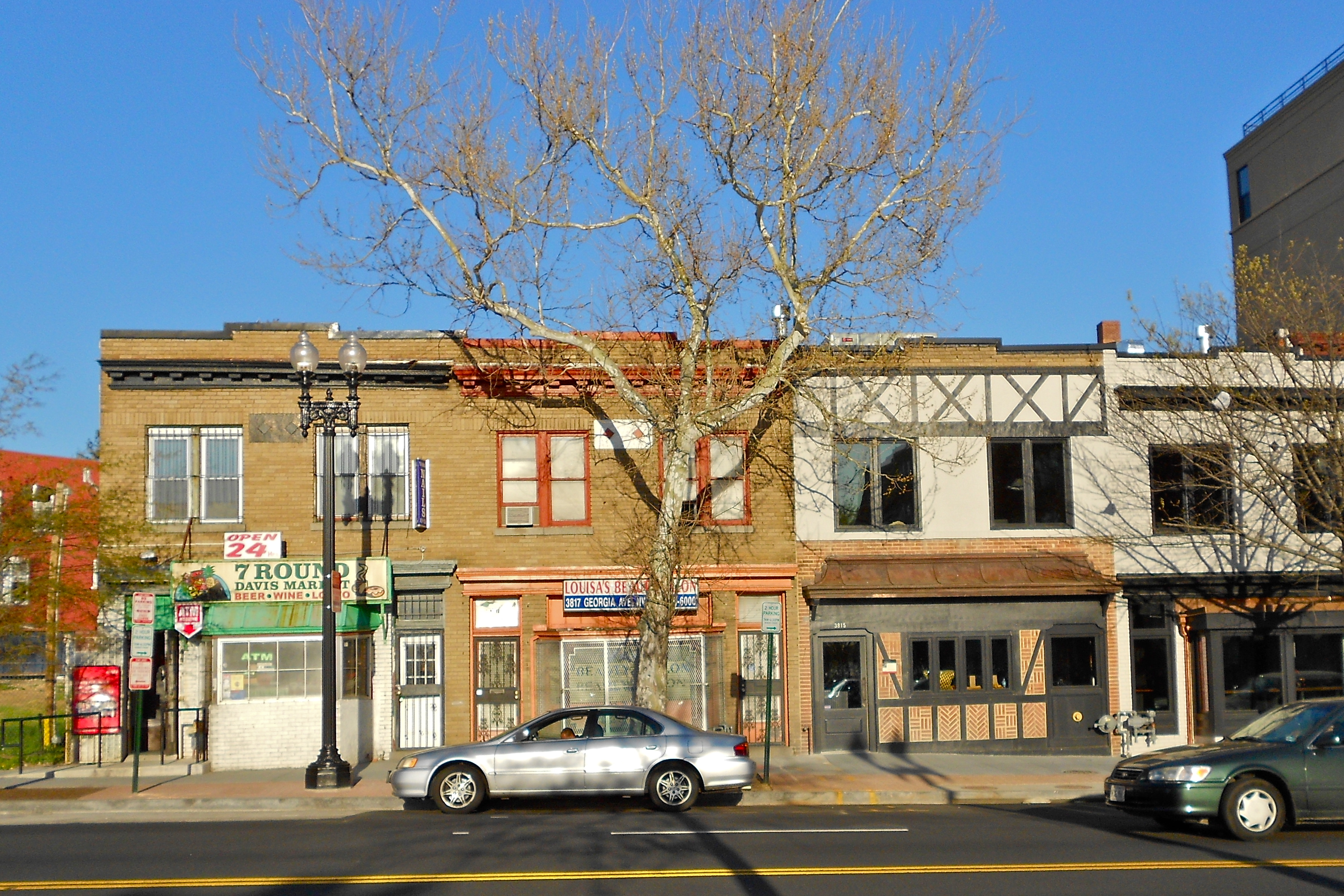
The historic site of Billy Simpson's House of Seafood and Steaks

- Blelvis, entertainer
- David Grosso, politician
- Christina Henderson, politician
- Robert A. Levy, pundit
- Paperhaus, band
- Michael Steele, political commentator
- Martha Tabor, labor organizer and artist
- John Tayloe III, aristocrat and politician
