= History of street lighting in the United States =

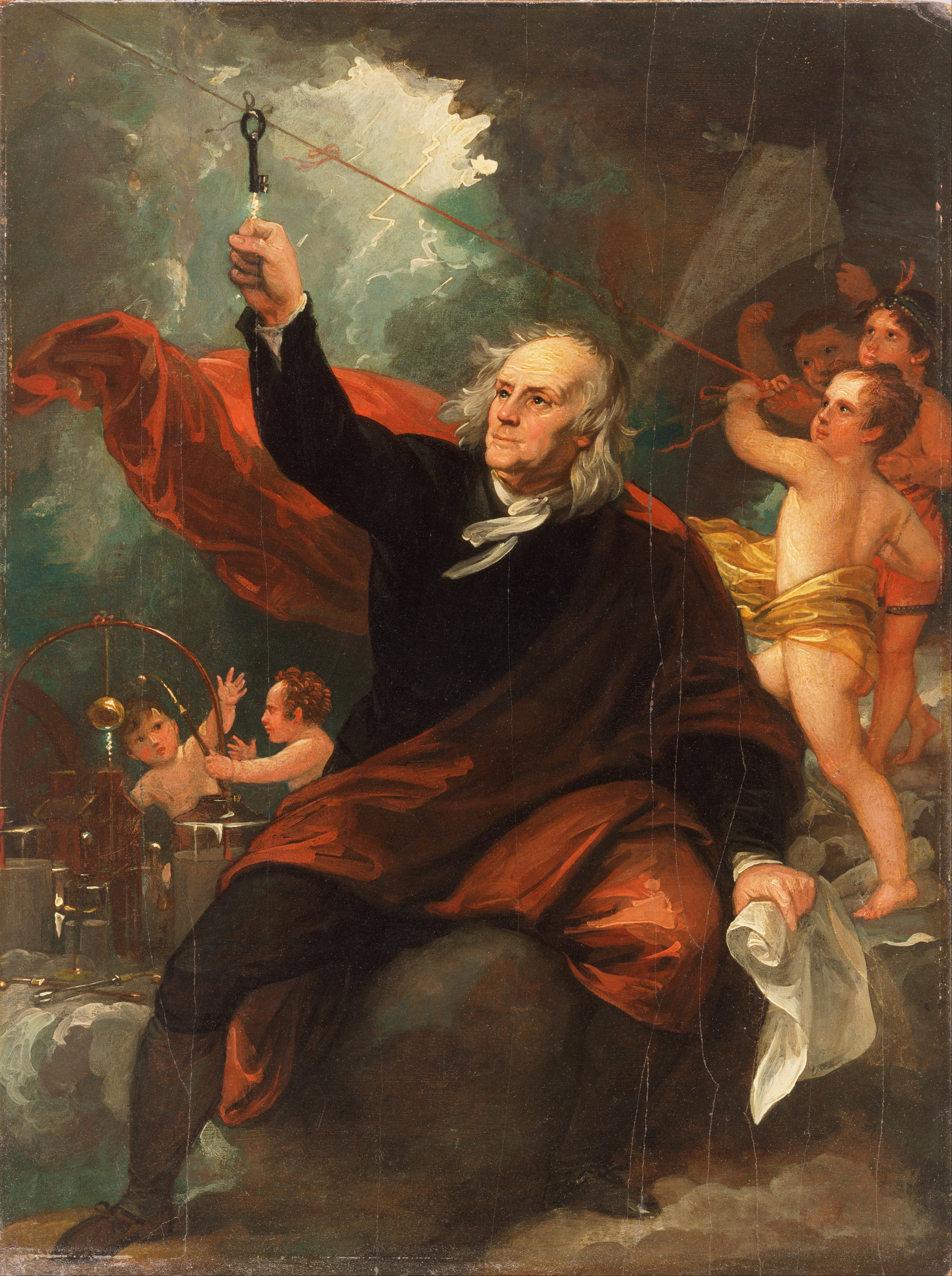
Benjamin Franklin Drawing Electricity from the Sky, by Benjamin West (c. 1816, Philadelphia Museum of Art) portrays Founding Father Benjamin Franklin's interest in harnessing nature to improve the lives of his fellow human beings.

The history of street lighting in the United States is closely linked to the urbanization of America. Artificial illumination has stimulated commercial activity at night, and has been tied to the country's economic development, including major innovations in transportation, particularly the growth in automobile use. In the two and a half centuries before LED lighting emerged as the new "gold standard", cities and towns across America relied on oil, coal gas, carbon arc, incandescent, and high-intensity gas discharge lamps for street lighting.

== Oil lamp street lighting ==
The earliest street lights in the colonial America were oil lamps burning whale oil from the Greenland or Arctic right whales of the North Atlantic, or from sperm whales of the South Atlantic, South Pacific, and beyond. Lamplighters were responsible for igniting the lamps and maintaining them. As early as the 1750s, inventor Benjamin Franklin of Philadelphia introduced innovations in oil lamp design, such as using two woven wicks to siphon oil from a reservoir, and flat panes of glass which could be easily replaced and were cheaper than blown glass bowls.

In Boston, a citizens' committee led by John Hancock installed more than 300 oil lamps from England in 1773. The year before, a newspaper editorial had called for a system of public lamps to prevent crime and protect citizens at night. The glass globes were placed on posts ten feet high and spaced fifty feet apart along the street, following the system used in London. These early street lights were "more suggestive than real"; in practice, pedestrians moved from one pool of light to another, walking through shadow in between.

In New York, more than 1,600 oil lamps were in use as city street lights in 1809. The city had started using spermaceti oil, which burned more brightly than candles, in its street lamps from as early as 1792. Philadelphia was close behind during this period, with 1,100 street lamps.

== Gas street lighting ==
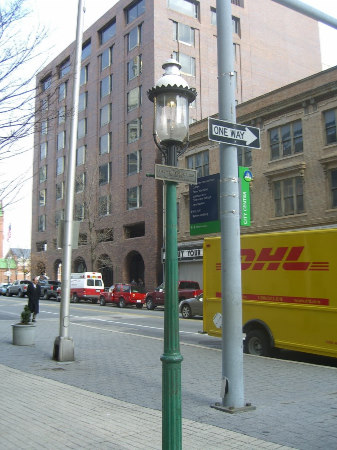
Replica of the first public gas street lamp in America, first lit by the Gas Light Company of Baltimore on February 7, 1817.

Gas lamps gradually started replacing oil street lamps in the United States, beginning in the first quarter of the 19th century. The first street in the world to be illuminated by gaslight was Pall Mall in London, starting in 1807. The first US city to use gas street lights was Baltimore, starting in 1817. In 1816, artist Rembrandt Peale had demonstrated the use of gas lamps to light exhibits at the Peale Museum in Baltimore, displaying what The Federal Gazette and Daily Advertiser called "the beautiful and most brilliant light". The following year, a group of investors formed the Gas Light Company of Baltimore, which was authorized by the municipal government to lay pipes to use coal gas to light public streets.

Although both New York and Philadelphia experimented with gas street lighting around this time, the sophistication of their existing oil-based lighting systems meant that those cities were slower to replace the street lamps they already had with technology that was still unproven. By 1835, New York, Philadelphia, and Boston had also built the requisite infrastructure of piped networks connected to manufacturing gas plants (MGPs) to supply gas light to shopping boulevards, wealthy residential neighborhoods, and major thoroughfares. That year, only 384 of New York City's 5,660 street lamps were gaslights. Chicago turned on its first hundred-odd gaslights on September 4, 1850.

Gas light was up to ten times brighter than light from oil lamps, but by present-day standards, the lights appeared "distinctly yellow and not very bright". In 1841, British author James Silk Buckingham observed that New York City's street lights were inadequate: “The lamps are so far apart and so scantily supplied with light that it is impossible to distinguish names or numbers on the doors from carriages or even on foot without ascending the steps." By 1893, New York City had 26,500 gas street lights and only 1,500 electrical lights.

== Electric street lighting ==
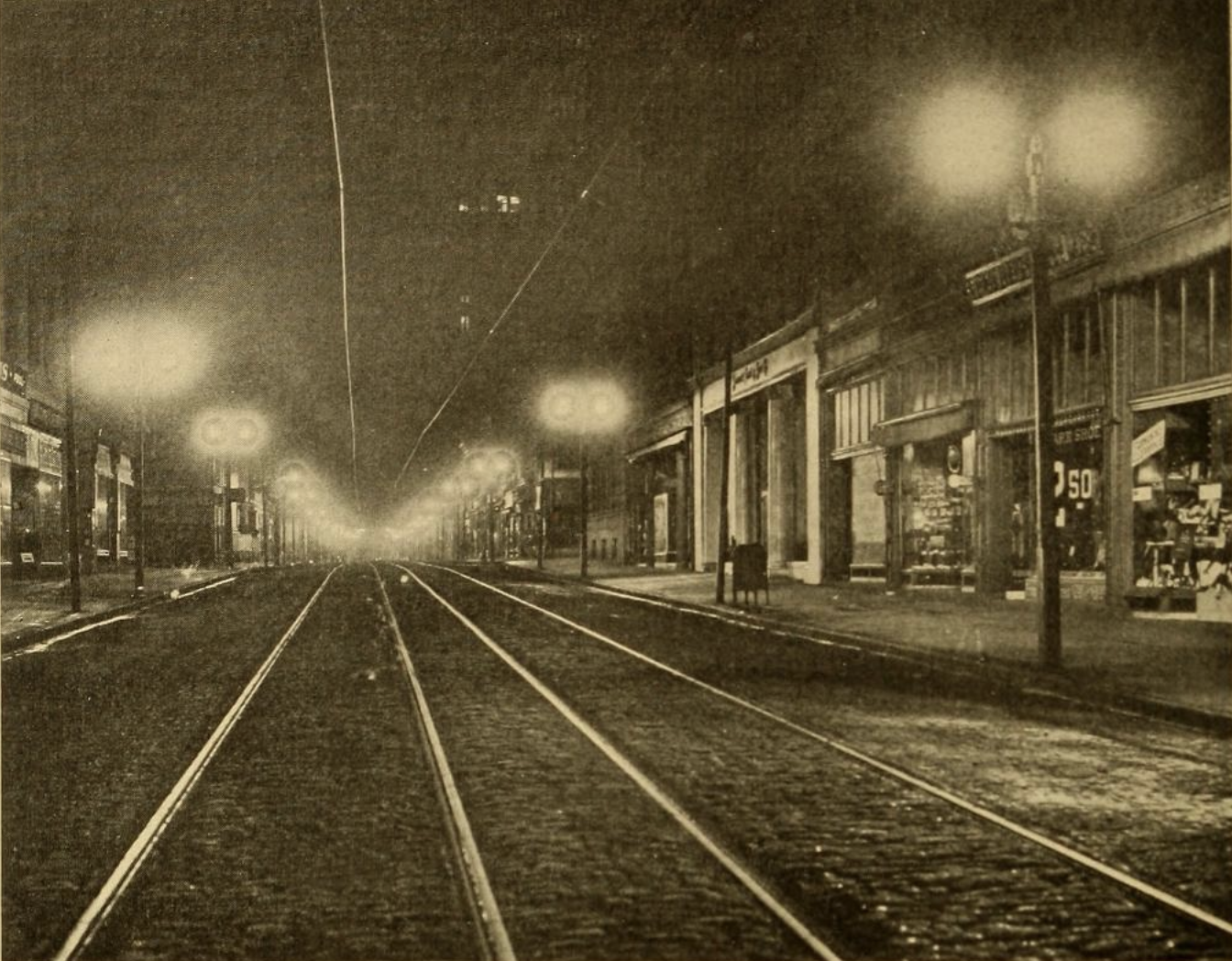
Arc lamps illuminating Baltimore Street in Baltimore, Maryland, in 1909.

=== Arc lamps ===
The first public demonstration of outdoor electrical lighting in the US was in Cleveland, Ohio, on April 29, 1879. Inventor Charles F. Brush had been perfecting the dynamo arc light, which could produce a glow equivalent to 4,000 candles in a single lamp. For the demonstration, which drew a crowd of thousands, Brush positioned twelve 2,000-candlepower lamps on towers around Cleveland's Public Square (then known as Monumental Park), and fully illuminated it with electric light.

The first municipal government to purchase and install the Brush arc lighting system was the city of Wabash, Indiana. On March 31, 1880, Wabash became "the first town in the world generally lighted by electricity," as four 3,000-candlepower Brush lights suspended from the flagstaff on top of the Wabash County Courthouse were switched on, flooding the neighborhood with light. According to an eyewitness, "The people, almost with bated breath, stood overwhelmed with awe." The journalist reported that he had been able to read a newspaper, held up to the light, from one street away; from two blocks away, he could still read the headlines; from four blocks away he could make out the advertisements.

Demand for the Brush street lighting system grew quickly, as it provided higher-quality light for one-third the cost of gas lamps. In 1880, Brush conducted a demonstration in New York City, erecting 23 arc lamps along Broadway. As a result, Brush won several city contracts including contracts for lighting Union Square and Madison Square, where towers were erected for the arc lamps. On major thoroughfares such as Broadway, arc lamps were placed on lampposts at 250-foot intervals; by 1886, approximately 30 miles of thoroughfares in New York City were lit by arc lamps. On Fifth Avenue, however, arc lamps were dismantled after residents complained that the wires connecting the fixtures were "unsightly", and most of the street "returned to the gloom of gas." By 1893, New York City had 1,535 electric arc street lights.

In New Orleans, arc lamps were used for street lighting starting in 1881. In 1882, the New Orleans Brush Lighting Company installed one hundred 2,000-candlepower arc lamps along five miles of wharf and riverfront; by 1885, New Orleans had 655 arc lights. In Chicago, arc lamps were used in public street lighting starting in 1887. At first, arc lamps were only used on Chicago River bridges, but by 1910, they were used more widely on major Chicago streets.

=== Incandescent lights ===
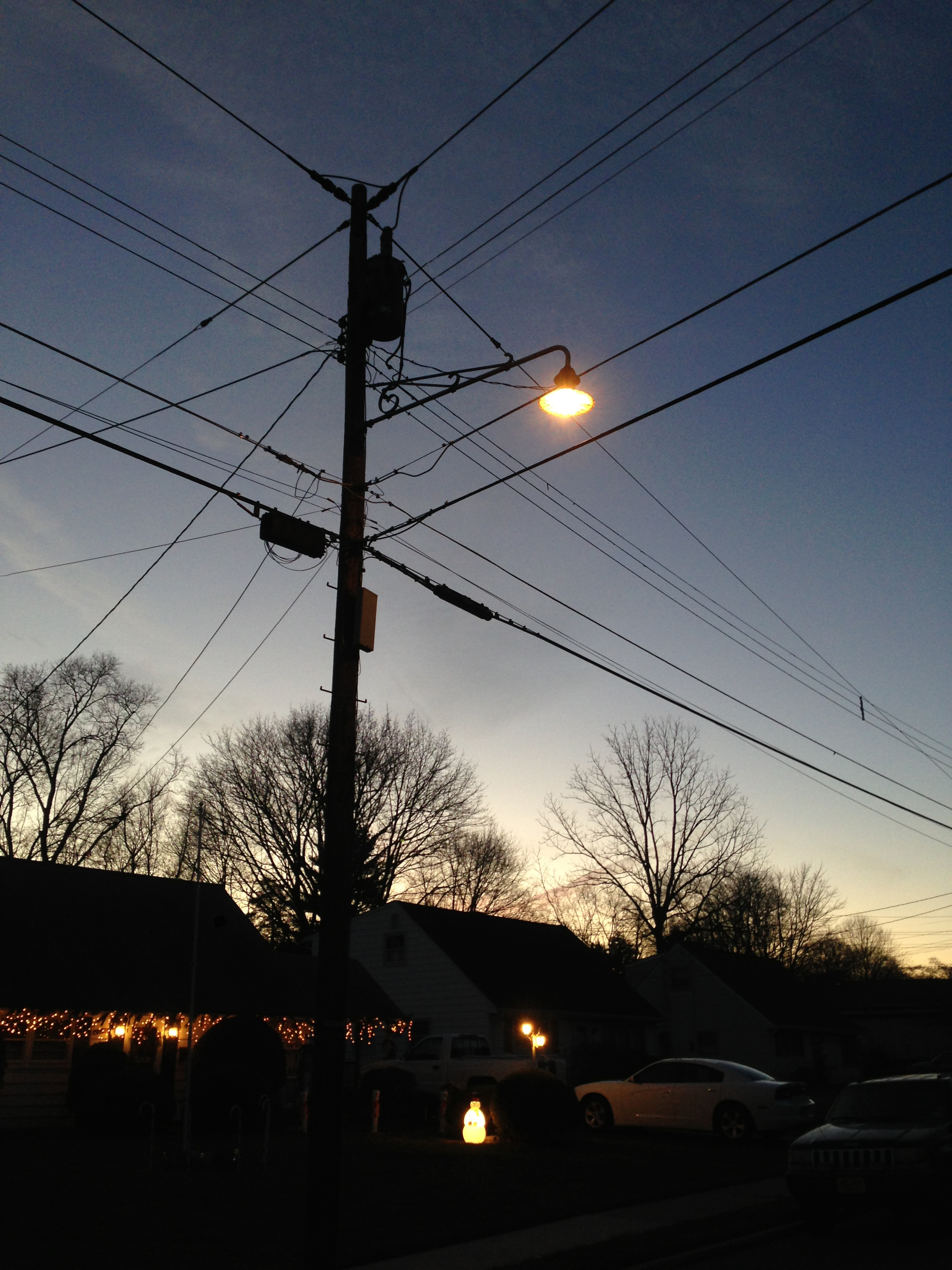
Incandescent street light in Ewing, New Jersey (2014)

During the first two decades of the 20th century, there was intense competition among providers of various forms of street lighting, including carbon arc lamps; incandescent lamps; traditional coal gas lamps; and gasoline and naphtha street lamps. Incandescent lamps were initially developed primarily for indoor use, but major technology breakthroughs in 1907 and 1911 perfected the use of tungsten filaments. From 1911 onward, electric incandescent lamps with tungsten filaments became an increasingly popular choice among municipal utilities for public street lighting.

In 1917, Fargo, North Dakota used a floodlight to illuminate an intersection.

By 1917, the number of incandescent filament lamps used in street lighting had reached 1,389,000 across the United States, while the number of arc lamps had started to decline.

In 1919, San Francisco introduced tungsten bulbs on Van Ness Avenue, between Vallejo and Market Street, replacing gas mantles and arc lamps. The city used two 250-candlepower tungsten lamps per column, on sixteen columns for every block. According to The Electrical Review: “Under the old system of lighting it was dangerous for a pedestrian to attempt to cross the street because of the heavy automobile traffic. Now the entire street is flooded with evenly distributed light and the appearance of the street as well as the public safety has been greatly enhanced."

=== Mercury vapor lamps ===
By the mid-20th century, increasing motorization necessitated better illumination, particularly in business districts where there was more mixing of cars and pedestrians, as well as along commercial thoroughfares. Streets needed to be illuminated more evenly, and a minimum level of lighting needed to be maintained throughout the night. Street lighting became a major expense for US cities, which sought to control costs in various ways. From the point of view of a municipal lighting department, the fact that incandescent lamps "radiate with very low efficiency, producing relatively little light at visible wavelengths", made them less and less attractive for public street lighting.

Mercury vapor streetlights started to be used more widely in the United States after 1950, mainly due to their cost efficiency. By then, the lifespan of mercury vapor lamps had been extended to 16,000 hours, and they could provide up to 40 lumens per watt, whereas incandescent lamps could only deliver 16 to 21 lumens. The first large street installation of mercury vapor lamps in the United States was in Denver, Colorado, on Park Avenue, where they were used together with incandescents. In 1964, nearly 39 percent of street lights in the US were mercury vapor, while incandescents accounted for 60 percent. By 1973, the use of incandescent outdoor lamps was rapidly declining, while the production of mercury vapor lamps soared.

=== Sodium vapor lamps ===
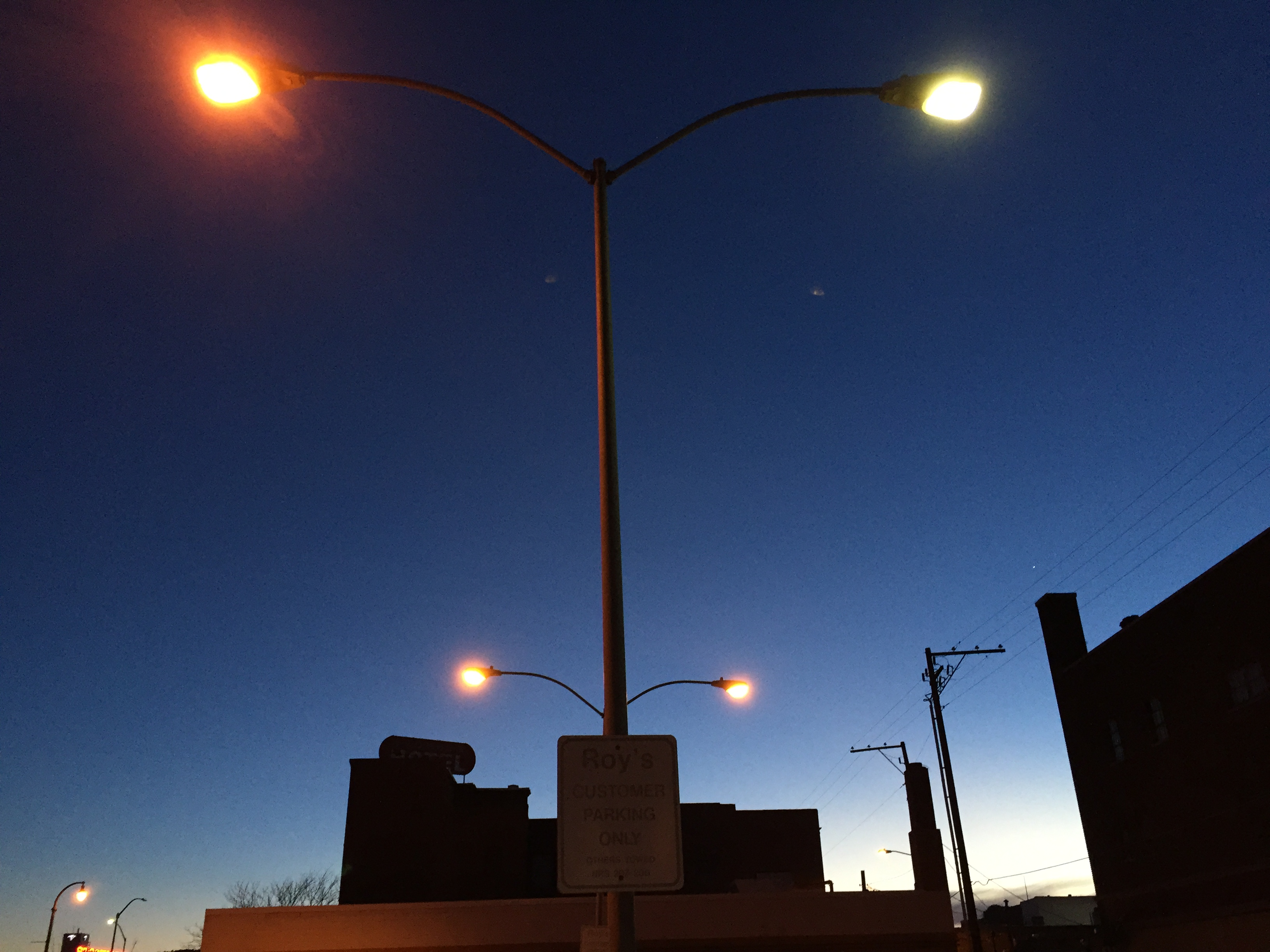
Lamppost with two street lights using high pressure sodium vapor lamp (Left) and mercury vapor lamp (Right) in Elko, Nevada (2015)

Low-pressure sodium vapor street lights produce a strong monochromatic yellow light, which also reveals more detail to the human eye, even at low levels of luminance. In the 1930s, sodium vapor lamps were not efficient enough to make them a compelling alternative to incandescents. However, because they enhanced visual acuity, they were recommended for safety lighting in tunnels, on bridges, and at "cloverleaf" interchanges on express highways.

In the US, street lights using sodium vapor were first installed on a rural highway near Port Jervis, New York, in 1933. In 1938, a study of sodium vapor light use at selected intersections in Chicago claimed that the new lighting had helped to reduce the number of accidents in those areas. Lamp manufacturers started to promote sodium vapor lamps for "crime fighting", a marketing strategy that backfired when cities such as Newark and New Orleans rejected sodium vapor, to avoid publicly stigmatizing high-crime neighborhoods.

When the availability of high-pressure sodium vapor lamps coincided with the rise of social unrest in the mid-1960s, lamp manufacturers once again promoted the potential for sodium vapor lighting to enable better street surveillance. High-pressure sodium lamps produced a distinct "yellow/orangeish light", brighter than mercury vapor light, which has been described as a "harsh metallic blue" in hue. During the OPEC oil embargo, Mayor Richard J. Daley announced a plan to make Chicago "the first large U.S. city to have sodium vapor lamps on all residential streets", replacing 85,000 mercury vapor streetlights. Although a December 1973 article in the Chicago Tribune was optimistic about the "more cheerful, brighter, gold-colored vapor lamps", the newspaper's own architecture critic worried about the "eerie, ominous quality of sodium vapor illumination". In 1976, the large-scale installation of sodium vapor lamps began on Chicago's arterial streets.

In the end, the most critical factor in favor of sodium vapor lamps was their cost. In 1980, the annual operating cost for the average incandescent lamp was $280; for mercury vapor lamps, it was $128; for low-pressure sodium vapor lamps, it was $60 a year. Meanwhile, high-pressure sodium vapor lamps cost only $44 a year to operate, with a standard life expectancy of 15,000 hours, which also helped to lower labor and maintenance costs. According to the Edison Tech Center, sodium vapor lamps are "the most ubiquitous lamp for street lighting on the planet."

=== Light emitting diodes ===
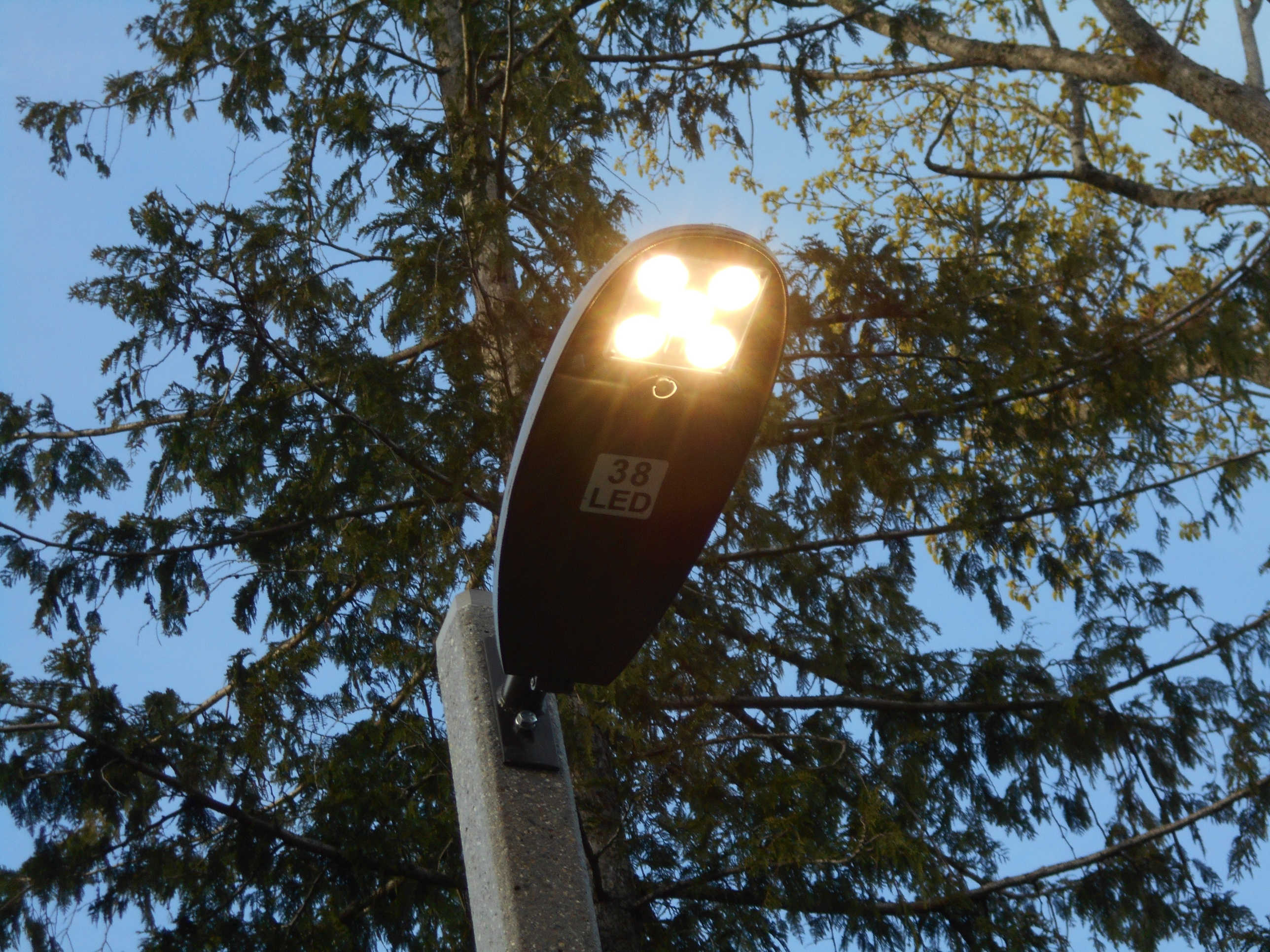
One of the LED streetlights in Bellingham, Washington, which is individually controlled via a smart network (2016)

In recent years, efforts to make street lighting more energy efficient have focused on using light-emitting diodes (LEDs) to replace high-pressure mercury (HPM), metal halide (MH), and high-pressure sodium (HPS) luminaires. LEDs also produce a whiter light, and can be installed as part of a centrally managed system with further energy saving controls, such as part-night lighting and dimming. Although the up-front costs of installing LED fixtures is significant, municipalities switching to LED street lighting generally expect to recoup their investment through reductions in ongoing electricity and maintenance costs. Many of the early projects in the United States also benefitted from economic stimulus block grants.

In 2007, the city of Ann Arbor, Michigan, announced plans to become "the first US city to convert all of its downtown streetlights to LED technology." The city replaced 120-watt bulbs which lasted only two years with 56-watt LEDs that would last a decade, and expected to reduce its public lighting energy use by half. However, for the first two years, DTE Energy continued to bill Ann Arbor at the same rate as before, because the street lights were not metered, and electricity charges were estimated based on past use. Under the direction of the state utility regulator, DTE Energy eventually revised its rates for Ann Arbor based on the expected energy use for "experimental lighting technology", and credited the city retroactive to the installation. As of January 2011, the city of Ann Arbor had switched 1,400 of its 7,000 streetlight fixtures to LEDs, and saved approximately $200,000, including reduced maintenance costs.

== Other electric light generation methods ==
=== Towers ===
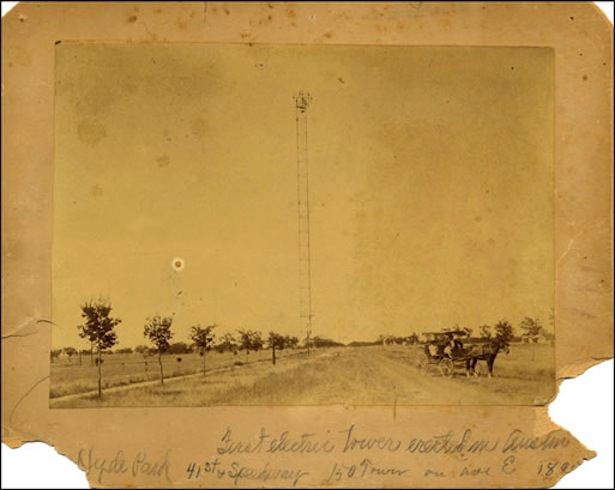
First Austin moonlight tower erected in 1895

Many cities across the United States experimented with tall tower structures to deliver light to entire city neighborhoods, similar to the arc lamp installation at the Wabash County Courthouse in Indiana. In 1802, Benjamin Henfry erected an oil-based "thermolamp" on a tall column in Richmond, Virginia, which failed to cast as much light as he had hoped for. In Washington, DC, city planners considered using the Washington Monument as a tower platform for lighting, but rejected the idea after placing test lamps on the Smithsonian Institution and United States Capitol buildings.

Municipalities that adopted tower lighting or "moontowers" for a period included Akron, Aurora, Austin, Buffalo, Chattanooga, Denver, Detroit, Elgin, Evansville, Fort Wayne, Hannibal, Kansas City, Los Angeles, Louisville, Minneapolis, Mobile, San Francisco, and San Jose. Most of these cities erected only one or two towers, before falling back on traditional lamppost lighting. One exception was Los Angeles, which erected 36 towers, fifteen of which were 150-feet tall and equipped with three 3,000-candlepower arc lamps each. Another exception was Detroit, which attempted to use 122 towers to illuminate 21 square miles of the city. Although the tower lighting in Detroit provided "uniform carpets of light", it was ineffective in providing sufficient lighting for high-traffic areas and routes. After five years, Detroit began to dismantle its towers.

As of October 2021, the only lighting towers that remain in the United States are in Austin, Texas. The city of Austin purchased 31 of Detroit's used moonlight towers in 1894. Seventeen of those towers, erected in Austin in 1895, continue to function as working lighting towers today.

=== Induction lighting ===
In 2009, PSE&G in New Jersey became the first utility in the US to use induction fluorescent lamps to replace mercury vapor lamps, in 220 municipalities. The induction lamps were expected to last 100,000 hours before requiring maintenance and consume 30 to 40 percent less electricity, thereby saving an estimated $1 million annually. The induction lamps also provide a whiter light, and contain less mercury.

Following extensive field tests, the City of San Diego decided in 2010 to replace 10,000 of its high-pressure sodium (HPS) streetlights with cobra-head induction luminaires. Astronomers from the nearby Palomar Observatory had objected to replacing the HPS lamps with light sources with higher color temperatures, which would increase light pollution and interfere with their research. One of the key findings of the field assessment was that LED luminaires became more expensive and less efficient at lower color temperatures. The City of San Diego has standardized on induction lighting for street lights, but uses low-pressure sodium (LPS) lamps within a 30-mile radius of the observatory.

== Urban Light ==
Urban Light at the entrance to the Los Angeles County Museum of Art (LACMA) Center, Los Angeles, is an assemblage of historical street lights taken from actual usage in Southern California in the form of a 2008 sculpture by Chris Burden.

== See also ==
- Bartlett street lamp
- Gas lighting
- Intelligent street lighting
- Light pollution
- Light fixture
- Street lighting in the District of Columbia
