= Petworth Gardens =

- U.S. National Register of Historic Places
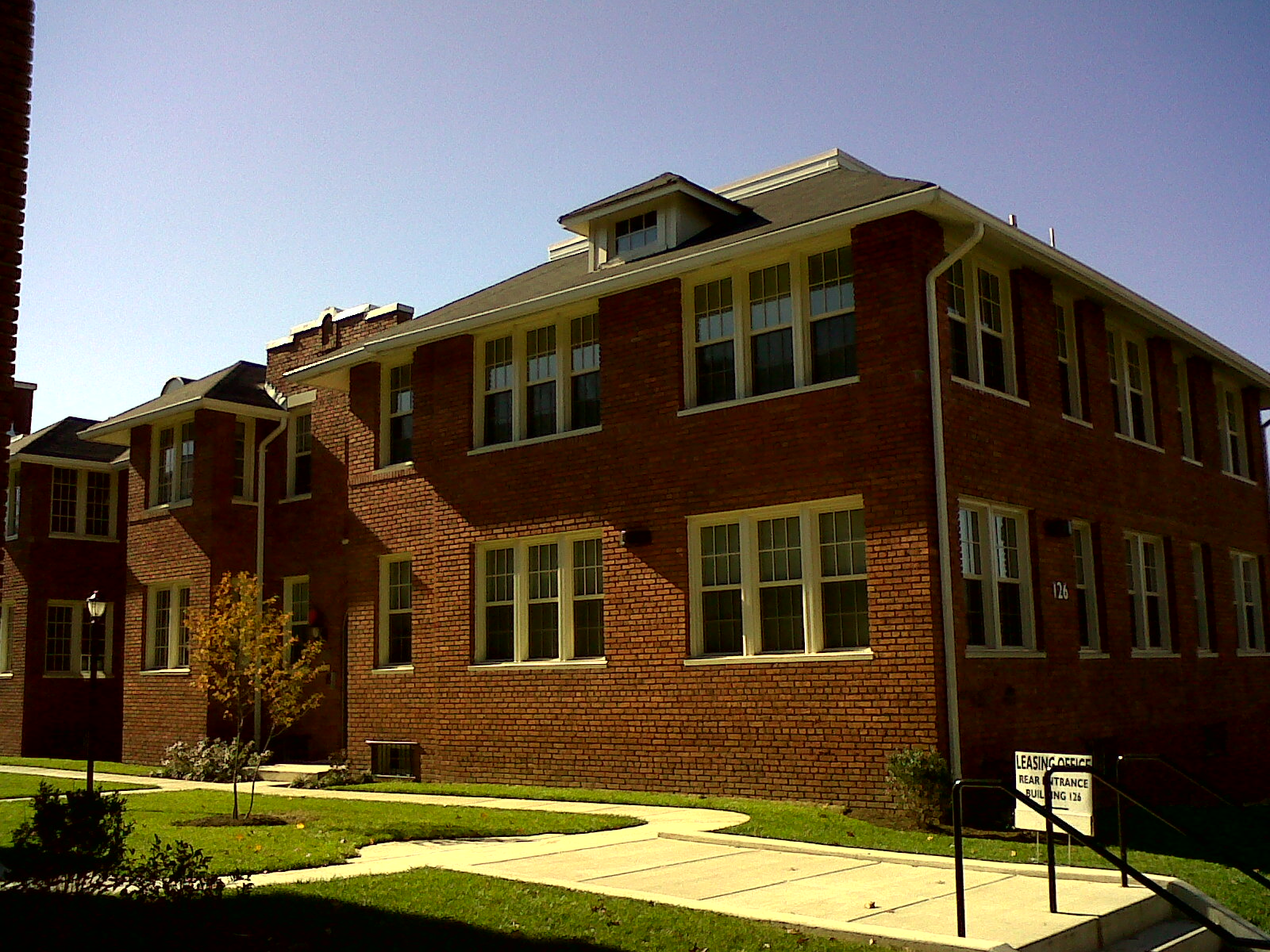

- Location within District of Columbia
- Location: 124, 126, 128, and 130 Webster St., NW; Washington, D.C.
- Coordinates: 38°56′38.8″N 77°0′47.31″W
- Built: 1921
- Architect: Robert F. Beresford
- MPS: Apartment Buildings in Washington, DC, MPS
- NRHP reference No.: 08001029
- Added to NRHP: November 10, 2008

Petworth Gardens, also known as the Webster Garden Apartments, are historic structures located in the Petworth neighborhood in the Northwest Quadrant of Washington, D.C. They were listed on the National Register of Historic Places in 2008.

== History ==
Petworth Gardens were the first garden apartments built in Washington and an early example in the United States. The concept was inspired by the Garden city movement, and the Londonese type apartments made famous in a play about Pomander Walk, row-houses on a pedestrian street in London and a similar place which was being developed in New York.

The four brick buildings were developed in 1921 by Allan E. Walker based on the designs of Robert F. Beresford. They are simple in design and feature the eclectic revivalism of the day. The buildings themselves have hipped roofs with dormers, exposed rafter ends, wide eaves, arched entry surrounds and the occasional hexagonal bay. The narrow ends of the buildings face Webster Street, which gives the individual buildings a house-like feel to them and allows them to blend into the surrounding neighborhood.
