= Petworth Neighborhood Library =

Library in Washington, D.C., United States

Coordinates: 38.942188°N 77.026109°W

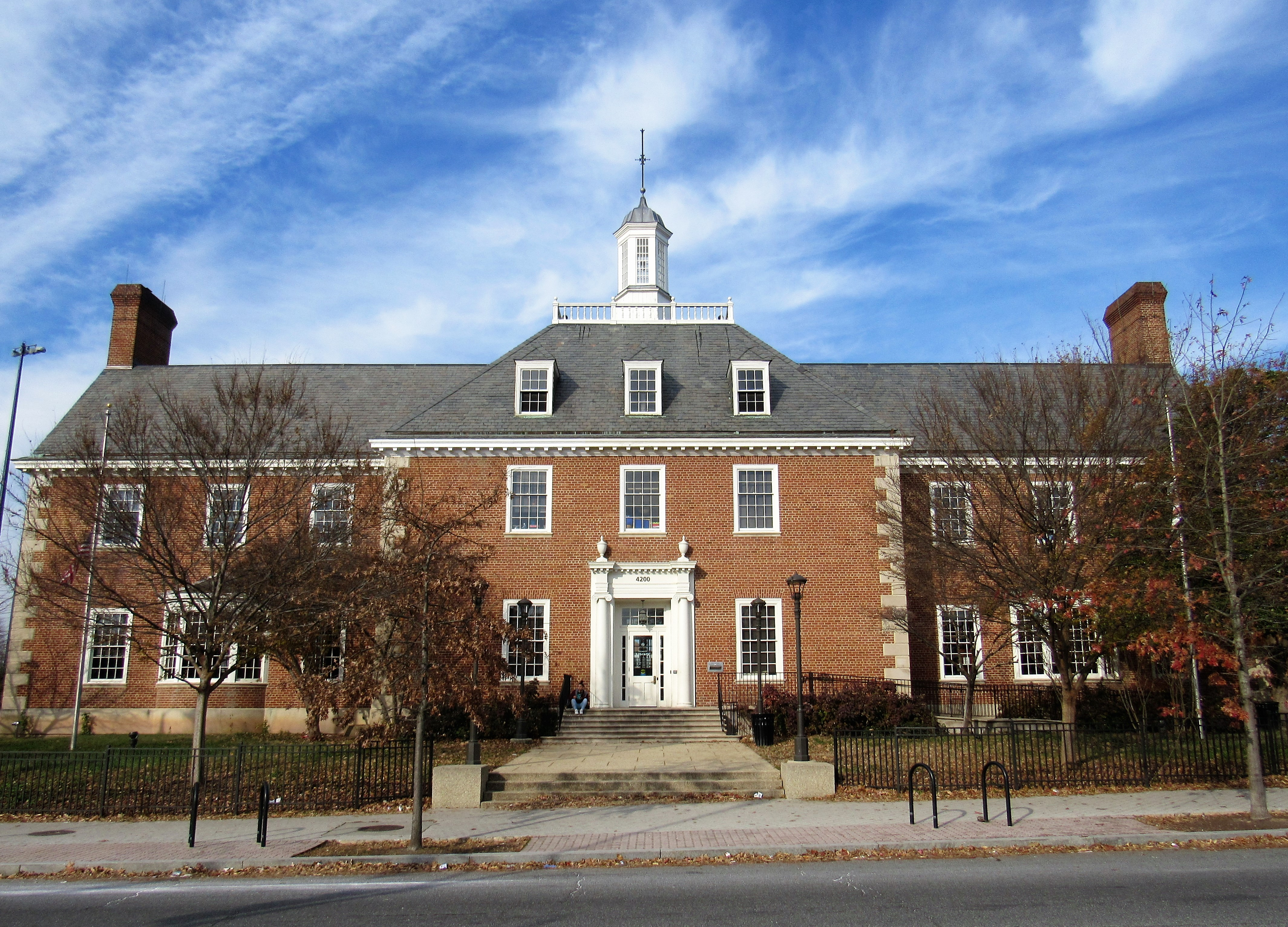
- The library in 2018
- Location: 4200 Kansas Ave. NW Washington, DC 20011, United States
- Type: Public library
- Established: 1939
- Architect: Nathan C. Wyeth
- Branch of: District of Columbia Public Library

Other information
- Website: https://www.dclibrary.org/petworth

The Petworth Neighborhood Library is a branch of the District of Columbia Public Library in the Petworth neighborhood of Washington, D.C., United States. It is located at 4200 Kansas Avenue NW.

== History ==
Petworth residents spent at least a decade advocating for a public library in their neighborhood, which had grown quickly after the extension of streetcar service to the area. In 1927, Gertrude Norcross supported a Petworth library in a letter to The Washington Post: "This large section of the District, with Petworth as the logical center, where nearly every home is occupied by the owner, has eleven public school buildings filled to overflowing, but has now no accessible library facilities. The establishment of a public library there would fill a much-needed want."

A site was chosen near Theodore Roosevelt High School and MacFarland Middle School where "the library would serve the junior and senior high schools on the same campus, [and] eight elementary public schools and parochial schools within easy walking distance."

However, it took years to secure funding for the building, with $180,000 eventually provided by Congress; construction started in December 1937.

Designed by architect Nathan C. Wyeth in the Georgian Revival style, it opened in January 1939 as the city's sixth neighborhood library. When it opened, the Post hailed the opportunity for "[g]reater learning and richer leisure hours ... for the residents of Petworth."

The building was a civil defense station during World War II and hosted, among other things, meetings of air-raid wardens.

The library was damaged by arson in January 1982 and remained closed for repairs until February 1983.

Neighborhood support helped it survive an effort by city officials to close it in the 1980s.

Anthony A. Williams, the fifth mayor of the District of Columbia, kicked off his 1998 campaign at a rally on the library's front lawn.

The building was renovated from 2009 to 2011. The renovation gave the building "a new cupola and balustrade, a community room connecting to an outdoor patio and a children’s story room."

In 2023, it was the scene of a fatal stabbing.

== Facilities ==
The library building is home to more than 40,000 books and other resources, as well as 40 computers for public use. In addition to two study rooms, the library holds a 100-person community room and a 12-person conference room.

== Recognition ==
Washington City Paper in 2014 named it the city's best library.

The building's 2009-2011 renovation was honored in 2011 by the Washington, D.C., chapter of the American Institute of Architects for "merit in historic resources."

In 2018, the library building was listed on the National Register of Historic Places.
