= (Here I Stand) In the Spirit of Paul Robeson =

Sculpture in Washington, D.C.

(Here I Stand) In The Spirit of Paul Robeson
- Artist: Allen Uzikee Nelson
- Year: 2001
- Type: Steel
- Location: Washington, D.C., United States; 38°56′33.84″N 77°1′31.97″W

(Here I Stand) in the Spirit of Paul Robeson is a public artwork by American artist Allen Uzikee Nelson, located at the intersection of Kansas Ave NW, Georgia Ave NW and Varnum St NW in the Petworth neighborhood in Washington, D.C., United States. It is a tribute to musician, actor, and social activist Paul Robeson.

== Description ==
This Cor-Ten steel sculpture stands like a sign in the middle of the intersection. It rises upwards and opens into a large face with heavy African influences. The greenish glass frames the face. The artist describes it as a "Janus-face".

== Artist ==
Originally from Tupelo, Mississippi, Uzikee now lives in Washington, D.C. His background in engineering provides a basis for his work. His creative goal is to combine "African design and aesthetic into subconscious culture." All of his works are three-dimensional, steel and glass. His work has been on display at Howard University, Martin Luther King Jr. Memorial Library, and throughout the United States.

== Acquisition ==
The piece was formally dedicated on April 8, 2001, to celebrate the 103rd anniversary of Paul Robeson's birthday.
