= Street lighting in Washington, D.C. =

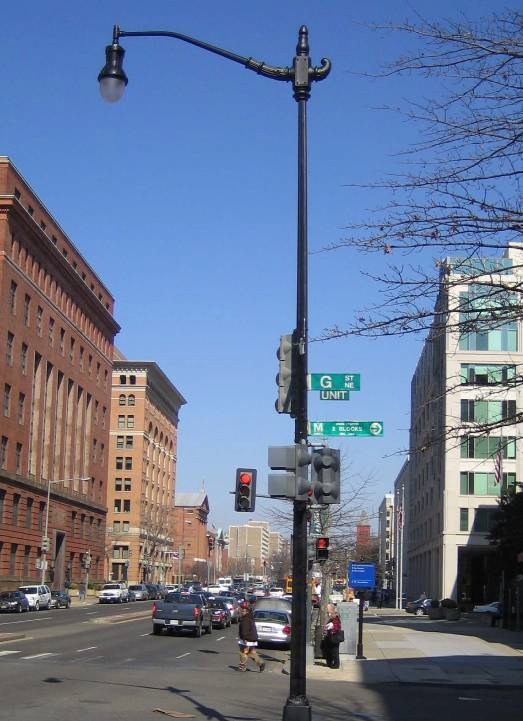
An example of a Decorative Teardrop Pole, approved by the U.S. Commission of Fine Arts for use in the District of Columbia.

In Washington, D.C., street lighting is provided by the District of Columbia Department of Transportation, and covers all city streets and alleys. Because the Constitution of the United States makes the district a creature of the U.S. federal government, the federal government has the authority to regulate the type and appearance of street lighting. Congress has delegated a part of this authority to the Commission of Fine Arts, which controls the appearance of lighting standards in certain areas of the city.

== Authority over and history of street lighting ==
=== Early street lighting ===
Article One, Section Eight of the U.S. Constitution grants the federal government the authority to establish and govern the seat of government of the country. On July 9, 1790, Congress passed the Residence Act, created the national capital on the Potomac River. The exact location was selected by President George Washington, who signed the bill into law on July 16. Congress passed the Organic Act of 1801, which officially organized the District and placed the entire territory under the exclusive control of the federal government. At the time, it was not envisioned that the capital city would be coterminous with the entire territory of the District of Columbia. A city charter, distinct from the Organic Act for the District, was needed. Congress enacted this charter on May 3, 1802. President Washington set the boundary of the new "Federal City" roughly where Pennsylvania Avenue NW is today.

Pennsylvania Avenue was created on April 14, 1792, when the three commissioners then overseeing the District of Columbia ordered "the middle of the avenue from the president's palace to the capitol" cleared. The actual clearing of Pennsylvania Avenue didn't begin until spring 1796. In the fall of 1800, Pennsylvania Avenue was cleared of underbrush, and a 6-foot-wide (1.8 m) raised footpath covered in stone chips was built. On March 3, 1803, President Thomas Jefferson ordered that Pennsylvania Avenue be widened and the road completed. Benjamin Henry Latrobe, the architect newly hired to supervise the avenue's reconstruction, built three lanes separated by four rows of Black Poplars.

In 1803, the City of Washington enacted legislation providing for the lighting of city streets for the first time. Pennsylvania Avenue was the first city street to be lit, and it remained the only street lit at night for 39 years.

=== Adoption of gas lighting ===
Congress passed legislation in 1842 ordering that Pennsylvania Avenue be lit with coal gas street lights. But the cost of lighting with coal gas was exorbitant. In 1844, Congress ordered the street lights lit only when the legislature was in session. The first coal gas manufacturing plant was organized in the District of Columbia in 1848, nearly two decades after most major cities had them. The cost of coal gas dropped significantly. Congress ordered the street lighting system expanded in 1850 and the in-session restriction on lighting the street lamps dropped. But still the lamps remained unlit when the moon was full. Additional coal gas manufacturing plants were built in the city in 1852 and 1858, allowing gas for lighting and cooking to reach most households in the District in the 1860s.

In response to mismanagement of the city's finances, Congress abolished the mayor-council form of city government in 1871. The new District of Columbia Organic Act abolished the city charters of the City of Washington, Georgetown, and the County of Washington, and merged them into a single territorial government. The office of governor was created, as well as an 11-member council, a locally elected 22-member assembly, and a board of public works. On March 16, 1871, Alexander Robey Shepherd was appointed vice chair of the Board of Public Works. Governor Henry D. Cooke rarely attended board of public works meetings, allowing Shepherd to dominate the body's deliberations. Shepherd rapidly spent millions of dollars improving the city's infrastructure. Shepherd's business sold street lights, and thus it was no surprise that his infrastructure improvements involved extending street lighting throughout the city. Shepherd was appointed governor on September 13, 1873. His tenure, however, was brief. Spending on his improvements, estimated at a then-staggering $6.5 million, rose to $9 million. With the city nearing bankruptcy, Congress enacted legislation that repealed the Organic Act of 1871 on June 20, 1874. A temporary three-person commission was formed to run the city. The temporary commission became permanent with the passage of the Act of June 11, 1878, "An Act Providing a Permanent Form of Government for the District of Columbia".

The Act of 1878 established Congress as the city's legislature. A permanent three-person commission formed the executive branch of government for the District of Columbia. Two of the members were citizens of the city, but the third was appointed by the President of the United States from the United States Army Corps of Engineers. The representative of the Corps of Engineers had authority over all public works and public works spending in the city. This form of government existed until President Lyndon Johnson reorganized the city government into a mayor-council form on June 1, 1967 (it took effect on August 1, 1967). The Senate confirmed Walter Washington as the first mayor-commissioner on September 21, and the nine council-commissioners on November 2.

=== Adoption of electric lighting ===
Electric street lighting came to the District of Columbia on October 15, 1881, when the Edison Electric Light Company installed lamps at 15th Street and Pennsylvania Avenue NW, and at 7th Street and Pennsylvania Avenue NW. The Heisler Company, the city's first electric utility, formed in the summer of 1882 and successfully illuminated F Street NW between 9th and 15th Streets. The United States Electric Lighting Company of the District of Columbia was formed in October 1882, took over the Heisler firm, and quickly began laying underground conduits for electric cables throughout the downtown area. But although the firm, at its own expense, erected and supplied power to street lighting along Pennsylvania Avenue, F Street, and a few other roads in the area, the city was slow to adopt the technology. It was not until 1891 that Congress agreed to pay for public lighting, which was installed on Pennsylvania Avenue SE, between 2nd Street SE and the Eastern Branch Bridge. In 1896, the Potomac Electric Power Company (PEPCO) formed in Virginia. It quickly sought to light homes and streets in the District of Columbia. After much legal wrangling, PEPCO won a contract in December 1896 to light streets east of Rock Creek. The two companies merged in 1889.

== Design of street lighting lampposts ==
The United States Commission of Fine Arts (CFA) has statutory authority to review all the "design and aesthetics" of all construction within Washington, D.C. Beginning in 1897, many groups severely criticized the aesthetic quality of the buildings, bridges, and other sundry infrastructure of the District of Columbia. They began pushing for a federal commission to approve the design of these items, but it was not until early summer 1910 that Congress enacted legislation establishing the Commission of Fine Arts.

The 1910 legislation establishing the CFA gave the commission the power to only provide advice on the siting of monuments and memorials. In October 1910, President William Howard Taft issued Executive Order 1259 (October 25, 1910), which required that all new public buildings erected in the District of Columbia be reviewed by the CFA as well. On November 28, 1913, President Woodrow Wilson issued Executive Order 1862, which expanded the CFA's advisory authority to cover any "new structures...which affect in any important way the appearance of the City, or whenever questions involving matters of art and with which the federal government is concerned..." Executive Order 3524, issued by President Warren G. Harding on July 28, 1921, further expanded the CFA's review to the design of coins, fountains, insignia, medals, monuments, parks, and statues, whether constructed or issued by the federal government or the government of the District of Columbia.

In 1911, the CFA adopted a temporary design for lampposts in the District of Columbia. Designed that same year by CFA member Francis Davis Millet, the "Millet post" was 10 feet 3 inches (3.12 m) high and provided 392.4 candela in light. The lamp was immediately fabricated and placed into widespread use in 1912.

In December 1922, the CFA undertook an initiative to both improve the street lighting in certain areas of the District of Columbia as well as design an aesthetically pleasing and uniform lamppost. Twelve designs were drafted by Captain John E. Wood, an engineer with the Army Corps of Engineers and a commissioner on the three-man Commission Government of the District of Columbia, and W.B. Hadley, a D.C. government electrical engineer. Designs ranged from a "Millet post" with a taller base to a huge 20-foot (6.1 m) double-globe post designed to light plazas and traffic circles. Captain Wood presented a final revised lamppost design to the CFA on November 15, 1923. The post was designed by Wood with input from PEPCO officials. Because commissioners felt that adequate illumination could only be delivered by two lights, the post had a cross-arm at the top. The post simple in its design, contained room for electrical wires and equipment in its hollow shaft and base, and was easily cleaned. The two-arm model was initially rejected by the CFA, however, because the arms appeared "stuck on" and not integral to the design. There were also issues with servicing and cleaning the lights in the two-arm model. A one-globe lamppost was approved instead. The approved single-globe model came in both 15-foot (4.6 m) and 18-foot (5.5 m) models, and could deliver 981 candela.

On February 1, 1924, the CFA took up the issue of the two-arm lamppost again. A 22-foot (6.7 m) tall double-globe model was presented by Captain Wood. The electronics and interior were designed by Wood and James Gosling, an electrical engineer from Schenectady, New York. CFA member Henry Bacon (who also designed the Lincoln Memorial) designed the exterior of the double-globe post. The shaft was a slightly modified version of the Millet post. The cross-arms were in the Beaux-Arts style. The double-globe model could deliver 1177.2 candela, and was called the "Bacon double-lamppost" due to Henry Bacon's influence on its design.

By 1926, single-globe lampposts had been erected on Massachusetts Avenue, while the double-globe version was in place on Dupont Circle, Grant Circle, and Thomas Circle.

== Current regulations ==
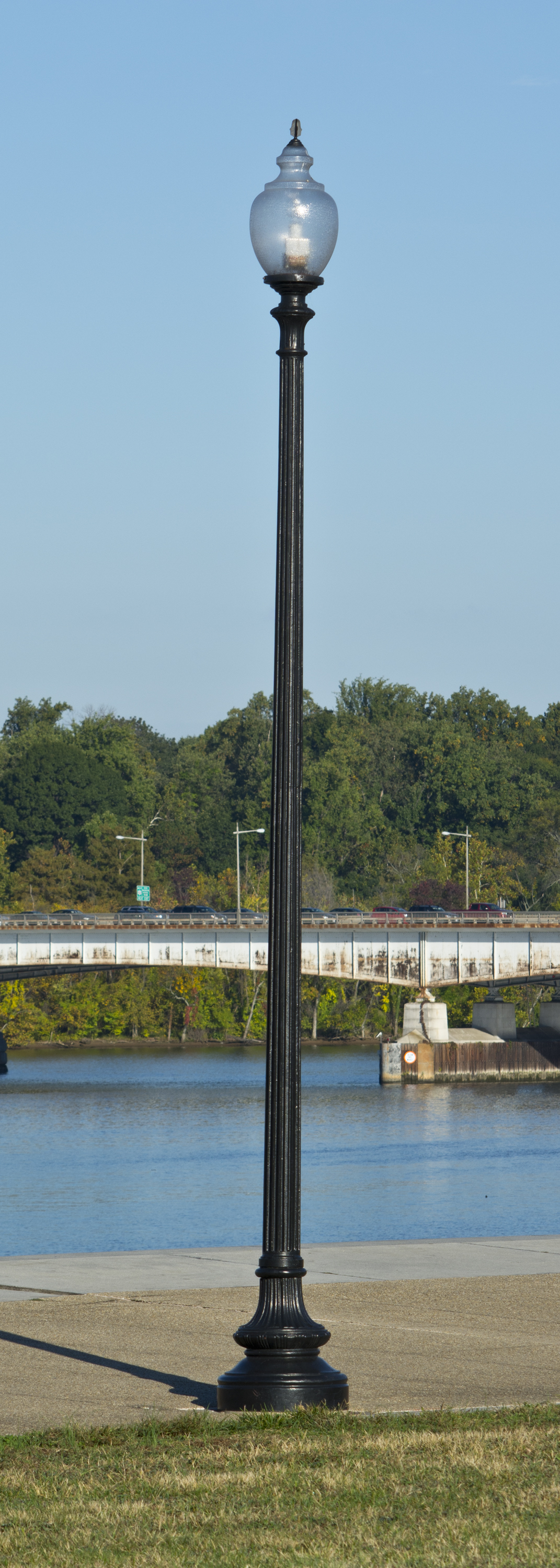
An example of the Number 13/Number 14/Number 16/Number 18 street light used in Washington D.C.

The District of Columbia achieved home rule in 1973. The District of Columbia Department of Public Works, and after 2002 the District of Columbia Department of Transportation (DDOT), had responsibility for street lighting.

=== Types of lampposts ===
Under DDOT guidelines and regulations adopted in February 2013, different type of street lights are permitted to be used in the District of Columbia. Collectively, the different lampposts and globes used in the District of Columbia are known as the "Washington Family of Streetlight Poles".

- The "Washington Upright Poles" are the most decorative, and are designated the 14, 16, 18, 716, and Twin-20. (Note: Other poles which belong to the Upright Poles but which are now obsolete are the 13N, 17M, 19M, and State Department Twin-20.) The Number 16 pole (which cost $5,000 in 2013) is the most commonly used Upright Pole. The 716 is a less expensive ($2,500 in 2013) version of the 16 pole. The slightly more decorative 18 pole is generally used only in the downtown area. The Twin-20 pole is the double-globe version of the 18 pole, and is used downtown, in historic districts, and at entry points into the city. The 16 and 18 poles have a 24-inch (61 cm) base, a 15-inch (38 cm) bolt circle, and accommodate a 70-400 watt lamp. The 14 pole has a 17-inch (43 cm) base, a 10.5-inch (27 cm) bolt circle, and accommodate a 70-150 watt lamp. The 716 pole has an octagonal 24-inch (61 cm) base, a 9.5-inch (24 cm) bolt circle, and accommodate a 70-400 watt lamp. (Note: The AD11 pole is a traffic signal variation of the 716 pole.) All Upright Poles have a steel shaft. (Note: Fiberglass shafts were once used, but are now obsolete.) The base, arm, and casing are either aluminum or cast iron.
- The "Decorative Teardrop Poles" are decorative lampposts on which a teardrop globe is suspended from a spindle arm that extends from the shaft. There are only a limited number of these poles installed as of 2013.
- The "Cobrahead Pendant Poles" are the most economical and least aesthetically pleasing of the lampposts. They have one or two arms, and accommodate a cobrahead 70-400 watt lamp. Pendant Post Poles come in two sizes: 28 feet 6 inches (8.69 m) and 38 feet 6 inches (11.73 m). There are a few very high Cobrahead Pendant Poles which are 70-to-100-foot (21 to 30 m) tall; these very high lampposts use a 1000 watt sodium-vapor lamp. (Note: The 5A Alley Post is a less decorative version of the Cobrahead Pendant Pole which is used in alleys.)

=== Lamps and globes ===
DDOT regulations provide for the use of three type of lamps: sodium-vapor, metal halide, mercury-vapor, LED, fluorescent, and incandescent. Sodium-vapor lamps are used almost universally throughout the city, except for the Monumental Core. Metal halide lamps are used primarily in the Monumental Core. LED lamps are being introduced, and mercury-vapor and incandescent lights are being phased out in favor of sodium-vapor lamps. Fluorescent lighting is used almost exclusively for underpasses.

DDOT-approved globes are made of glass or plastic. Glass globes (which cost $300 in 2013) are being phased out, as they can seriously injure individuals and cause property and automobile damage when they break. Most globes used in the city are plastic. These consist of the acrylic globe (which cost $125 in 2013) and the prismatic polycarbonate globe (which cost $200 in 2013).

=== Lamppost installation areas ===
Under federal law and DDOT regulations, streets in the District of Columbia are classified as historic or non-historic. Historic streets are required to use the more decorative poles, while non-historic streets may use the less decorative ones. All streets are required to maintain uniformity and consistency in the use and placement of lampposts. Historic streets with underground power lines may use the black Upright 14, 16, or 18 pole. Historic streets with above-ground power lines may use the black Decorative Teardrop pole.

Some historic streets are further classified as Special Streets. Special Streets (also known as Capital Avenues) include roadways which are part of the National Highway System, are "gateway" streets which lead motorists into the heart of the city, (Note: There were 55 gateway streets in 2013.) "important" streets which are critical to the integrity of the L'Enfant Plan, and streets which exist within the Monumental Core. All Special Streets use Upright Poles. Special Streets with underground power lines may use the black Twin 20 Upright Pole in commercial areas, but must use the black Cobrahead Pendant Pole in residential or mixed-use areas. Special Streets with above-ground power lines must use the black Cobrahead Pendant or the black Decorative Teardrop pole. The Monumental Core streets must use either the black Upright 16 or black Twin-20 with a 400 watt metal halide lamp.

Non-historic streets fall into two categories: Those areas with underground power lines, and those areas with above-ground power lines. Areas with underground power lines may use any type of pole, although the Cobrahead Pendant Pole is used only when other types are cost-prohibitive. Areas with above-ground power lines must use the Decorative Teardrop Pole, although the Cobrahead Pendant can be used if the Teardrop Pole is cost prohibitive. DDOT recommends use of the Cobrahead Pendant Poles because they are economical.

The District of Columbia has a number of business improvement districts (BIDs). The 18 Upright Pole is generally used in a BID.

== See also ==
- History of street lighting in the United States

== Bibliography ==
- Acosta, Luis M. (2013). "The Legal History of the District of Columbia Prior to Home Rule: A Bibliographic Essay". In Chiorazzi, Michael; Most, Marguerite (eds.). Prestatehood Legal Materials: A Fifty-State Research Guide, Including New York City and the District of Columbia. New York: Routledge. ISBN 9781136766022.
- American Federation of Arts (1911). American Art Annual. New York: MacMillan.
- Berg, Scott W. (2008). Grand Avenues: The Story of Pierre Charles L'Enfant, the French Visionary Who Designed Washington. New York: Random House. ISBN 9780375422805.
- Bryan, Wilhelmus Bogart (1914). A History of the National Capital From Its Foundation Through the Period of the Adoption of the Organic Act. New York: Macmillan.
- Caemmerer, Hans P. (1932). Washington, the National Capital. Washington, D.C.: Government Printing Office.
- Commission of Fine Arts (1926). Tenth Report of the Commission of Fine Arts. July 1, 1921 to December 31, 1925. Washington, D.C.: Government Printing Office.
- Crew, Harvey W.; Webb, William Bensing; Wooldridge, John (1892). Centennial History of the City of Washington, D.C. Dayton, Ohio: United Brethren Publishing House.
- District of Columbia Department of Transportation (February 2013). District of Columbia Streetlight Policy and Design Guidelines (PDF). Washington, D.C.: District of Columbia Department of Transportation.
- District of Columbia Engineer Department (1927). Report of the Operations of the Engineer Department of the District of Columbia, for the Year Ended June 30, 1927. Washington, D.C.: Government Printing Office.
- Epps, Garrett (2013). American Epic: Reading the U.S. Constitution. Oxford: Oxford University Press. ISBN 9780199974740.
- Evans, Richard F. (Spring–Summer 1996). "The 19th-Century High-Tech Systems of Christian Heurich's Mansion". Washington History.
- Frary, Ihna Thayer (1969) [1940]. They Built the Capitol. Freeport, Connecticut: Ayer Publishing.
- Hansen, Stephen A. (2011). Kalorama Triangle: The History of a Capital Neighborhood. Charleston, South Carolina: History Press. ISBN 9781609494216.
- Joint Committee on the Library (1920). Establishment of a National Botanical Garden: Hearing Before a Joint Committee on the Library. Part 1. 66th Cong., 2d sess. Washington, D.C.: Government Printing Office.
- Kohler, Sue A. (1996). The Commission of Fine Arts: A Brief History, 1910-1995. Washington, D.C.: United States Commission of Fine Arts.
- Lessoff, Alan (2002). "Alexander R. Shepherd: The Haussmannization of Washington, D.C.". In Biles, Roger (ed.). The Human Tradition in Urban America. Wilmington, Del.: SR Books. ISBN 0842029923.
- Moore, Charles (1921). Daniel H. Burnham, Architect, Planner of Cities. Boston: Houghton Mifflin. p. 116.
- Newman, Jason I.; DePuy, Jacques B. (Spring 1975). "Bringing Democracy to the Nation's Last Colony: The District of Columbia Self-Government Act". The American University Law Review.
- Resnik, Judith; Curtis, Dennis E. (2011). Representing Justice: Invention, Controversy, and Rights in City-States and Democratic Courtrooms. New Haven, Conn.: Yale University Press. ISBN 9780300110968.
- Sharpe, C. Melvin (1946–47). "Brief Outline of the History of Electric Illumination in the District of Columbia". Records of the Columbia Historical Society, Washington, D.C.
- Tindall, William (1909). Origin and Government of the District of Columbia. Washington, D.C.: Government Printing Office.
- Tindall, William (1914). Standard History of the City of Washington From a Study of the Original Sources. Knoxville, Tenn.: H.W. Crew.
- Wentzel, Volkmar Kurt; Goode, James M. (1998). Washington By Night. Golden, Colo.: Fulcrum. ISBN 9781555914103.
