= Grant Circle =

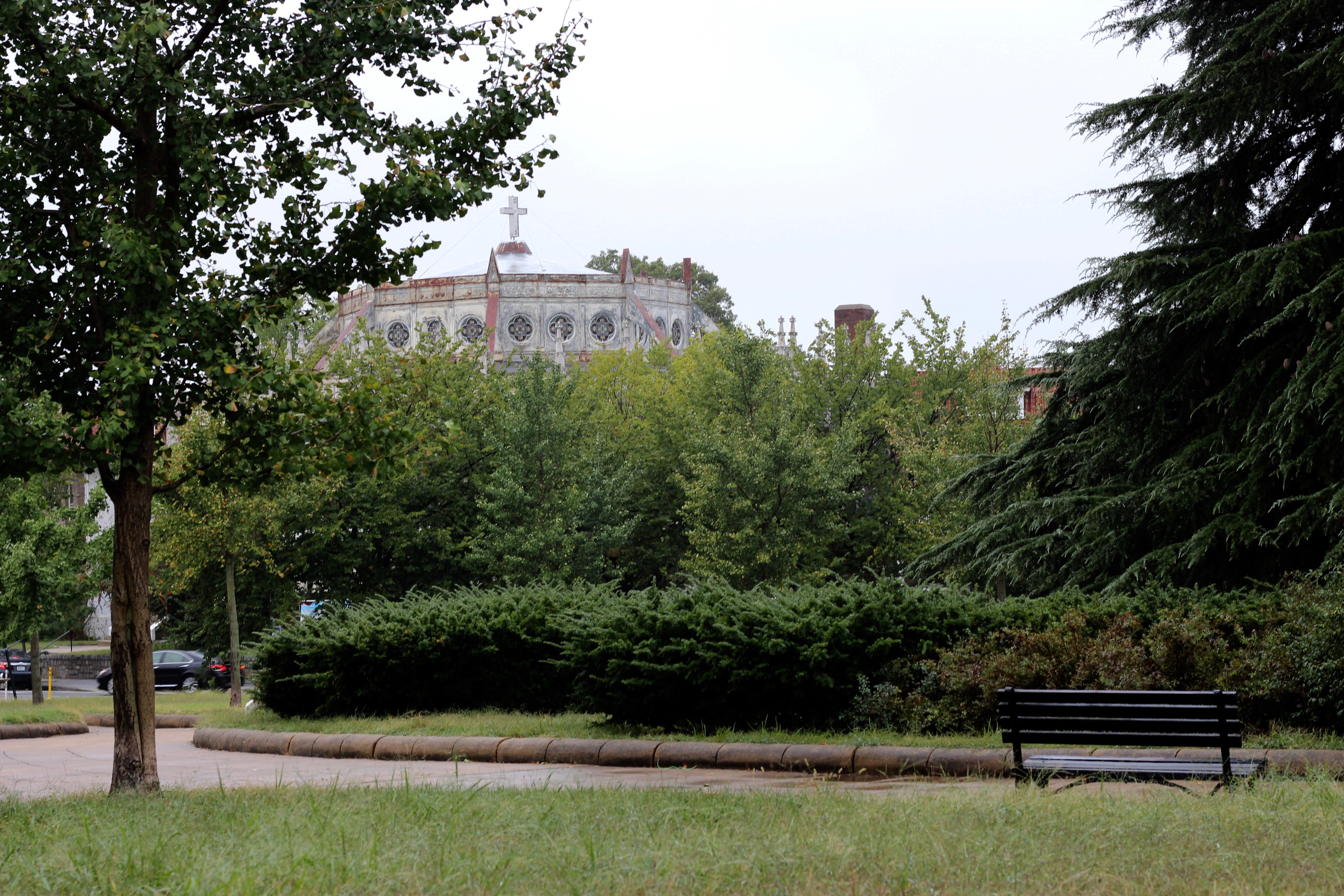
- Grant Circle, with Petworth United Methodist Church in the background, in September 2016.
- Interactive map of Grant Circle

Location
- Washington, DC
- Roads at junction: New Hampshire Avenue NW; Illinois Avenue NW; Varnum Street NW; 5th Street NW

Construction
- Type: Traffic circle
- Maintained by: DDOT
- Grant Circle Historic District
- U.S. National Register of Historic Places
- U.S. Historic district
- Built: 1915–1930
- Architect: Multiple
- NRHP reference No.: 15000718
- Added to NRHP: October 13, 2015

Grant Circle Park
- Location within District of Columbia
- Location: Formed by the intersection of New Hampshire Ave., Illinois Ave, Varnum St., & 5th St. NW; triangle bound by Illinois Ave., 5th St., & Webster St. NW; and triangle bound by Illinois Ave., 5th St., & Webster St. NW Washington, D.C.
- Coordinates: 38°56′35.2″N 77°01′09.3″W
- Area: 1.8 acres (7,300 m^{2})
- Operator: National Park Service; Rock Creek Park

Grant Circle is a traffic circle and the center of a small historic district in the Petworth neighborhood of Northwest Washington, D.C. New Hampshire and Illinois Avenues NW, Varnum Street NW, and 5th Street NW all intersect at this circle. The park within the circle and the adjoining triangles is owned and administered by the National Park Service through its Rock Creek Park unit. The circle and the buildings flanking it were listed on the National Register of Historic Places in 2015.

== History ==
Originally named Sheridan Circle, it was renamed Grant Circle in 1889. Grant Circle is named for Ulysses S. Grant, the former Union Army General who won the American Civil War and later was twice elected President of the United States. The local newsletter the Grant Circular is named after the circle. As of 1895, Grant Circle was unpaved, the area surrounded it was heavily wooded, and the only trace of commerce was an abandoned peanut stand nearby.

In 1906, while excavating a sand pit at Grant Circle and Illinois Avenue, sand banks caved in around several workers. James Major, an African-American worker, was buried in sand. The force of the sand broke Major's neck, killing him instantly. Other workers were buried up their necks and narrowly escaped death.

The blocks surrounding the circle were fully developed by 1920, and the 40-foot (12 m) roadway around it paved in 1921.

The 1.8-acre (7,300 m^{2}) park within the circle is owned and administered by the National Park Service through its Rock Creek Park unit.

Petworth Methodist Episcopal Church bought land at the southern intersection of Grant Circle and New Hampshire Avenue to build a new church. Petworth Methodist Episcopal Church had been at 8th and Shepherd Streets until its land was acquired by the District's commissioners to build a school, today called Petworth Elementary School. Designed by M.F. Moore, the church was patterned after the style of the period of John Wesley, founder of Methodism. The church was completed in 1916.

Petworth Catholic Church was built on the northwestern side of Grant Circle, between Varnum and Webster streets, in 1920.

Grant Circle was one of the first locales in the city where the double-globe "Bacon lamppost" was erected. The Beaux-Arts-style street light was approved by the United States Commission of Fine Arts in 1924, and is still used only in the city's historic core.

== Park features ==
Once considered as a site to relocate a fountain from the U.S. Botanic Garden and Bartholdi Fountain grounds, the park contains no statues or memorials. When the circle was built, it was in a very rural area, far from the center city, and erecting a statue of Ulysses S. Grant would have been considered an insult.

Landscaped with a variety of trees and shrubs, the park provides walkways, park benches, and opens space for dog walking. The triangle to the north contains a small fenced-in playground.

== See also ==
- List of circles in Washington, D.C.
- Ulysses S. Grant

== Bibliography ==
- Commission of Fine Arts (1926). Tenth Report of the Commission of Fine Arts. July 1, 1921 to December 31, 1925. Washington, D.C.: Government Printing Office.
- Committee on Appropriations (1920). District of Columbia Appropriation Bill, 1922. Washington, D.C.: Government Printing Office.
- "District of Columbia Appropriations. S.Rept. 391. 66th Cong. 3d sess.". Senate Documents. December 6, 1920 to March 4, 1921. Vol. 16. 66th Cong. 3d sess. Washington, D.C.: Government Printing Office. 1921.
- Urban Mass Transportation Administration (1991). Washington Regional Rapid Transit System (Metrorail), Green Line (E Route) Mid-city Segment: Environmental Impact Statement. Washington, D.C.: U.S. Government Printing Office.
