= Blelvis =

- Also known as: Blelvis
- Born: Rondy Wooten; January 8, 1966 (age 60); Washington, D.C.
- Genres: Rock and roll, pop, rockabilly, country, blues, gospel, R&B
- Occupation: Musician
- Instrument: Vocals

Blelvis (the "Black Elvis") is the stage name of Rondy Wooten, a Washington, D.C., street entertainer who claims to know the words to every single one of the 1,112 songs ever sung by Elvis Presley. He also claims he is able to relate any given word to an Elvis song. Wooten describes himself as an "Elvisologist" rather than an Elvis impersonator. He has been referred to as a local legend, and has been profiled by the Washington City Paper and The Washington Post.

== Early life ==
Wooten is a native of Washington, D.C., born in 1966 at Georgetown University Hospital. By coincidence, he and Elvis share the same birth day, though not the same year. He grew up in the Petworth neighborhood of D.C. His parents disapproved of Elvis, believing him to be racist, so he had little experience with him until the age of 11. On August 16, 1977, the day Elvis died, every radio station was playing Elvis tracks in tribute to him. It was the first time that Wooten heard Elvis's music, and he wound up listening to it all night.

In 1987, he stumped a record-store owner with his extensive knowledge of Elvis's discography. Soon after, he adopted the name Blelvis and began to perform at small local gigs and cable TV shows. At the same time, he developed an addiction to crack cocaine that derailed his career as a truck-driver and rendered him homeless. He left D.C. to study the Bible in Billings, Montana, then lived in Colorado before returning to D.C. In a 1997 interview, he stated that he has not used crack cocaine since 1995, although a 2007 profile notes that he abuses alcohol instead.

Wooten now rarely plays shows, but continues to perform as a street entertainer.

== Personal life ==
Wooten married 27-year-old Cathy Grooms at the age of 18, just after he graduated high school. They had four children during their twelve-year marriage. The eldest two, Elvison and Elvisa, are named after Elvis. Wooten's obsession with Elvis, capped by Grooms's refusal to give their younger children Elvis-inspired names, was a significant factor in the deterioration of their relationship. They divorced in 1996.
