= Martha Tabor =

American sculptor

- Born: March 11, 1939; Knoxville, Tennessee
- Died: January 10, 2004 (aged 64); Washington, DC
- Occupation(s): laborer, photographer, artist
- Spouse: Michael Tabor (divorced)

Martha W. Tabor (1939–2004) was an educator, laborer, union organizer, photographer, and notable artist in the Washington, D.C., area.

== Early life ==
Tabor was born on March 11, 1939, in Knoxville, Tennessee, but was raised in Washington, D.C. Tabor, a Quaker, was an active member of the Friends Meeting of Washington, D.C.

Tabor earned a bachelor's degree from Colby College in 1961. She went on to earn a master's degree in comparative literature from the University of Maryland in 1967 and eventually earned a second master's degree in photography from Goddard College in 1980. She was married to Michael Tabor, though the two eventually divorced.

== Early career ==
Tabor held a number of jobs throughout her life and described her career path as "somewhat unusual." One of her first jobs in the 1960s was teaching literature and composition at Frederick Community College in Frederick, Maryland. Around that time, Tabor became interested in trade union activity through her involvement in the anti-Vietnam war movement and the United Farm Workers' grape boycott in Washington. Between 1969 and 1973, Tabor worked at the Office of Economic Opportunity. During her employment there, she was a member of the American Federation of Government Employees (AFGE) Local 2677. Tabor also served as President of Local 2677. Tabor ran for National President of AFGE in 1972, but lost.

Tabor worked as a laborer from 1974 to 1979, primarily in construction as a welder and steel worker in Washington, D.C. Tabor was the first female journeyman of the Washington, D.C., Local of the Piledrivers' Union in the United Brotherhood of Carpenters and Joiners of America, Local 2311. She was also the first female welder to work on the District of Columbia's Washington Metro system. While involved with the unions, Tabor and other women advocated for greater support and equal rights for women in the construction trades. Tabor left the construction trades around 1979 as a result of the intense discrimination she experienced both in the union and on the job as one of the only female construction workers at the time.

== Artwork ==
Tabor transitioned from a career as a laborer to one as an artist in the late 1970s. Tabor worked out of her home studio in the Petworth neighborhood of Washington, DC Her primary artistic mediums were photography, screenprinting, and sculpture. She received a number of grants for her artwork and held artist's residencies at the MacDowell Colony, Virginia Center for the Creative Arts, Studios Midwest, and the Blue Mountain Center.

=== Photography ===
While a laborer in Washington, D.C., Tabor began taking photographs of her fellow laborers. She founded her freelance photography business, Working Images, in 1979. Many of her photographs focus on documenting blue and white collar workers, women workers, midwives, and Washington, D.C., municipal employees. A collection of her labor-related photographs is held as part of the George Meany Memorial AFL-CIO Archive in Special Collections at the University of Maryland Libraries.

Tabor received a number of grants for her photography, including one from the National Endowment for the Arts, the DC Commission on the Arts and Humanities in 1980, and the Swedish Government. Tabor was a member of Impact Visuals photographers' cooperative in New York City.

=== Screenprinting ===
Tabor started studying screenprinting in 1986. She studied under Dennis O'Neil at the Corcoran School of Art. Tabor later taught screenprinting at the Corcoran and at the Women's Studio Workshop and Pyramid Atlantic Art Center. One of her most renowned projects is a series of screenprints titled "My Dog as Art."

=== Sculpture ===
Tabor began focusing on her sculpture around 1990. One of her most prominent works is a series of wooden sculptures based on traditional gospel music. Her sculptures are in the permanent collections of the Loudon Hospital Center, the Washington Theological Union, the Virginia Center for the Creative Arts, Wesley Theological Seminary, Friends Meeting of Washington, the Urban Institute, and the Children's Inn at the National Institutes of Health. As with her photography, Tabor received a number of grants for her sculpture.

== Death ==
Tabor died of cancer on January 10, 2004. She had battled cancer since 1996. Prior to her death, Tabor made a number of photographic donations to area repositories including the National Library of Medicine at the National Institutes of Health, the Historical Society of Washington, D.C., and the George Meany Memorial Archives at the National Labor College (now defunct and held by Special Collections at the University of Maryland).
