= New Leaf (Scheer) =

Artwork by Lisa Scheer

- Artist: Lisa Scheer
- Year: 2007
- Type: Bronze
- Dimensions: 137.16 cm × 243.84 cm (54.00 in × 96.00 in); 76.2 cm diameter (30.0 in)
- Location: Washington, D.C., United States; 38°56′12.58″N 77°1′27.15″W
- Owner: Washington Metro

New Leaf is a public artwork by American artist Lisa Scheer, located at the Georgia Avenue – Petworth Metro Station in Washington, D.C., United States. "New Leaf" was created through D.C. Commission on the Arts and Humanities.

== Description ==
A large leaf constructed of metal rests on a two-step platform. Inscribed on the sculpture is a poem by E. Ethelbert Miller reading:

every leaf surrenders to air
we dance
we flutter
we touch the earth

== Artist ==
Lisa Scheer is a sculptor from Washington, D.C, and a professor at St. Mary's College of Maryland. Scheer has her B.A. from Bennington College and an MFA in sculpture from Yale University. Her work has been exhibited at the Baltimore Museum of Art, Phillips Collection, and Kreeger Museum. She has received grants and awards from the likes of the Pollock-Krasner Foundation, National Endowment of the Arts, and the Maryland Arts Council. Her work is also seen at Ronald Reagan Washington National Airport.

== Acquisition ==
In 2004, the D.C. Commission on the Arts and Humanities issued an open call to further the acquisition of public art in the D.C. Metro area. Scheer replied to the open call requesting proposals for a work of art at the Petworth Metro station. The piece was installed in 2007.

== Information ==
Scheer describes "New Leaf" as "a sort of abstracted form, but it also looks a tremendous amount like a leaf, or something very organic and growing, and I do mean to do that because I mean to evoke metaphors of growth and change and seasonal time shifts."
