= Bartlett street lamp =

19th-century lamp type

The Bartlett street lamp was an economical type of lighting first patented and manufactured by J. W. Bartlett at 569 Broadway in Manhattan in New York City, in 1872. Bartlett claimed his street lamps cost less than a quarter of the $25 The New York Times had reported a competitor claimed they cost. The Times responded that the New York City Parks Department said that they actually paid more than that for each lamp, including the post and frame, that they used in parks, streets, and elsewhere. The city of Troy, New York used the lamps beginning in 1872 to replace older models when they wore out.

== Advantages of use ==
According to Bartlett, a portion of the economy of the Bartlett street lamp was derived from the iron frames used in their construction. Other efficient qualities included a greater thickness of glass and less need for repair. Unless an object collided with a Bartlett street lamp with sufficient force, it would likely glance off of it. Likewise, drops of rain did not affect them after they were lighted. The Times disputed those contentions, saying the lamps were frequently cracked or broken. Lamplighters preferred them because they were easy to light and clean. Bartlett Street Lamps diffused light nicely, according to an advertisement.

== Innovative manufacturer ==
J.W. Bartlett presented a claim for $1,796 against the Department of Public Parks of New York City, in February 1872. By mid-1878 Bartlett introduced several devices which enabled lamplighting via electricity which he produced from an office at 950 Broadway. There were three inventions which each related to the other. One was an electric gas cock and lighter, which was controlled by the hand and which could be adjusted upon any gas fixture. The second was an automatic gas cock and lighter used in street lights and buildings. The third was an electric signal. As an experiment the lamps around Madison Square were fitted with automatic lighters. Each could be lighted or extinguished in a short time by placing a finger on the button of a battery at the office at 950 Broadway. Also the battery could be connected to a clock and the lights extinguished in just a moment.

== Manufacturing sites ==
The Railroad, Telegraph and Steamship Builders' Directory of 1888 lists a Bartlett Street Lamp Co., at 35 Howard Street in New York. It also mentions Bartlett Street Lamp Mfg. Co., at 42 College Place in New York.
