= Billy Simpson's House of Seafood and Steaks =

- U.S. National Register of Historic Places
- D.C. Inventory of Historic Sites
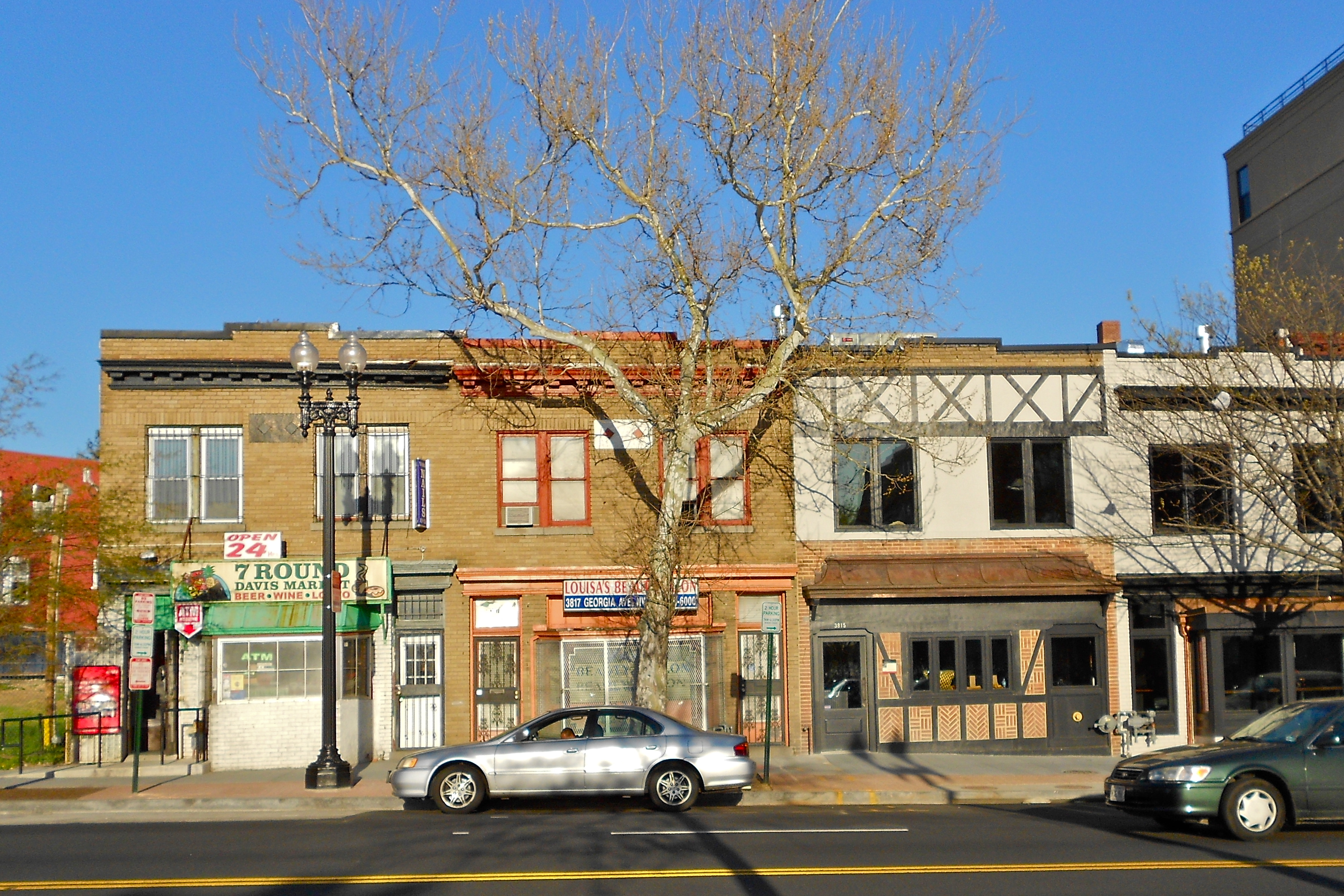
- Billy Simpson's (third building from the left), 2012

- Location within the District of Columbia Location within the United States
- Location: 3815 Georgia Ave., NW., Washington, D.C.
- Coordinates: 38°56′17″N 77°01′27″W
- NRHP reference No.: 09000152

Significant dates
- Added to NRHP: March 17, 2009
- Designated DCIHS: September 25, 2008

Billy Simpson's House of Seafood and Steaks, also known as The Ebony Table, Kushner's Sea Food Grill, Minoux Bakery, Harry C. Johnson & Son, or The Kaieteur, was a restaurant on Georgia Avenue in the Northwest area of Washington, D.C. It was listed on the National Register of Historic Places on March 17, 2009. It is notable for the role it played "in the social and political culture of the District of Columbia's African American community. The restaurant offered fine dining to the city's black middle and upper classes. Many notable people in politics, government, and entertainment frequented the establishment. The owner, William W. "Billy" Simpson, was a supporter of the era's civil rights and anti-war causes.

The building that housed the restaurant is located at 3815 Georgia Avenue NW and was constructed in 1923 as one in a row of four attached brick buildings.

In April 2012, the French Bistro Chez Billy was opened on the site.
