= Latin American Montessori Bilingual Public Charter School =

Coordinates: 38.9511444°N 77.034385°W

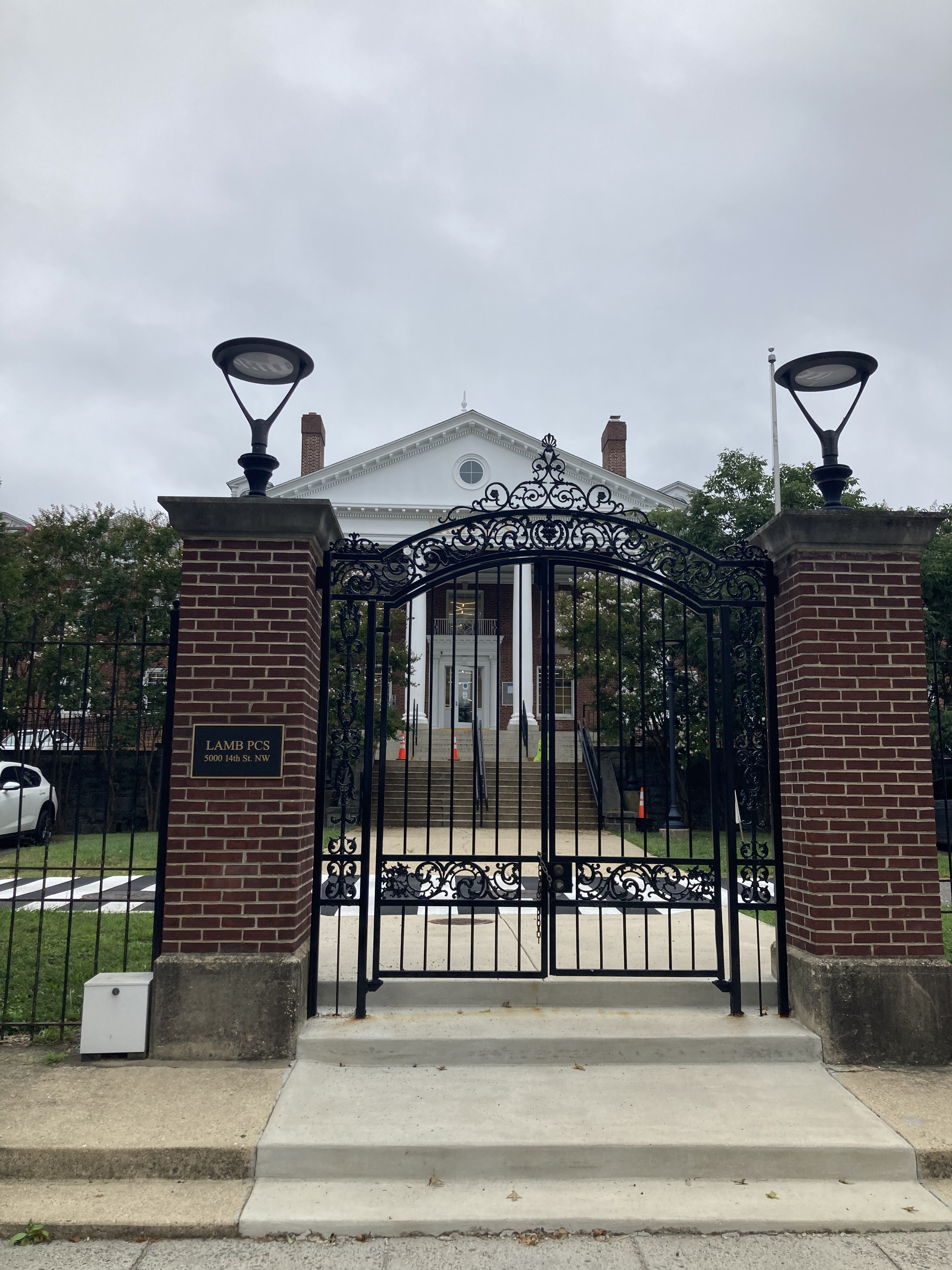
- LAMB's location on 14th Street N.W.

Location
- Washington, D.C. United States

Information
- Type: Charter school
- Established: 2001
- School district: District of Columbia Public Charter School Board
- Director: Dr. Jessica Panfil
- Principal: Alexandra Torres
- Faculty: 53
- Grades: Preschool through fifth grade
- Enrollment: 553 (2022-23)

Latin American Montessori Bilingual Public Charter School is a public charter school in Washington, D.C. on 14th Street in the Sixteenth Street Heights neighborhood.

It is overseen by the District of Columbia Public Charter School Board. As a charter school, LAMB is a nonprofit organization, funded by local tax revenue, and subject to some, though not all, of the same standards as traditional schools that are part of the District of Columbia Public Schools. Its admissions are based on a lottery system that takes into account preferences for siblings of current students and children of school faculty and staff.

== Curriculum ==
LAMB teaches a curriculum based both on the Montessori educational approach developed started in 1897 by Italian educator Maria Montessori and on Spanish-English bilingualism.

Students from preschool for 3-year-olds through grade five attend the school.

== History ==
LAMB was launched by the Latin American Youth Center, a Washington, D.C., non-governmental organization that serves young Latinos.

The school first had its application as a charter school approved by D.C.'s Board of Education in 2001, six years after Congress passed the District of Columbia School Reform Act of 1995, setting up the system for charter schools in the nation's capital. LAMB started classes in 2003 in Our Redeemer Lutheran Church, a church in Northeast Washington, while it looked for a long-term home. It had 57 students at the time.

The school moved to the Military Road School on Missouri Avenue in 2006, its first long-term location. It renovated the building between 2008 and 2009 and added office and classroom space, while preserving the historic schoolhouse.

In 2013, LAMB established a second location, sharing a building with the Perry Street Prep charter school on South Dakota Avenue in Northeast Washington. The building formerly housed the public Taft Junior Elementary School before the city closed that school in 1997 due to low enrollment.

LAMB opened its third location in 2017 on the former campus of the Walter Reed Army Medical Center in Northwest Washington. The school shares the former medical center's Delano Hall with the District of Columbia International School.

In 2020, LAMB moved to a newly renovated building at 5000 14th St. NW. The building was most recently used by the Kingsbury Center, a school for children and adults with learning differences, before it closed in 2019. As of 2023, LAMB has consolidated its school operations at its 14th Street location.

== Rankings ==
As of the 2020 My School DC citywide lottery for public and charter schools placement, LAMB is the most in-demand charter school in Washington, D.C., with a 1,630-student waitlist and 138 seats offered.

LAMB achieved a Tier 1 rating in the 2018–2019 school year, the highest rating the DC Public Charter School assigns, based on factors such as student achievement and progression. It scored 79.1% in the board's School Quality Report

In the District's Partnership for Assessment of Readiness for College and Careers standardized tests, 55.4% of LAMB students scored Level 4 or above in 2019 English Language Arts, the seventh highest of any charter school.
