= B'nai Israel Congregation (Rockville, Maryland) =

Conservative synagog in Rockville, Maryland, United States

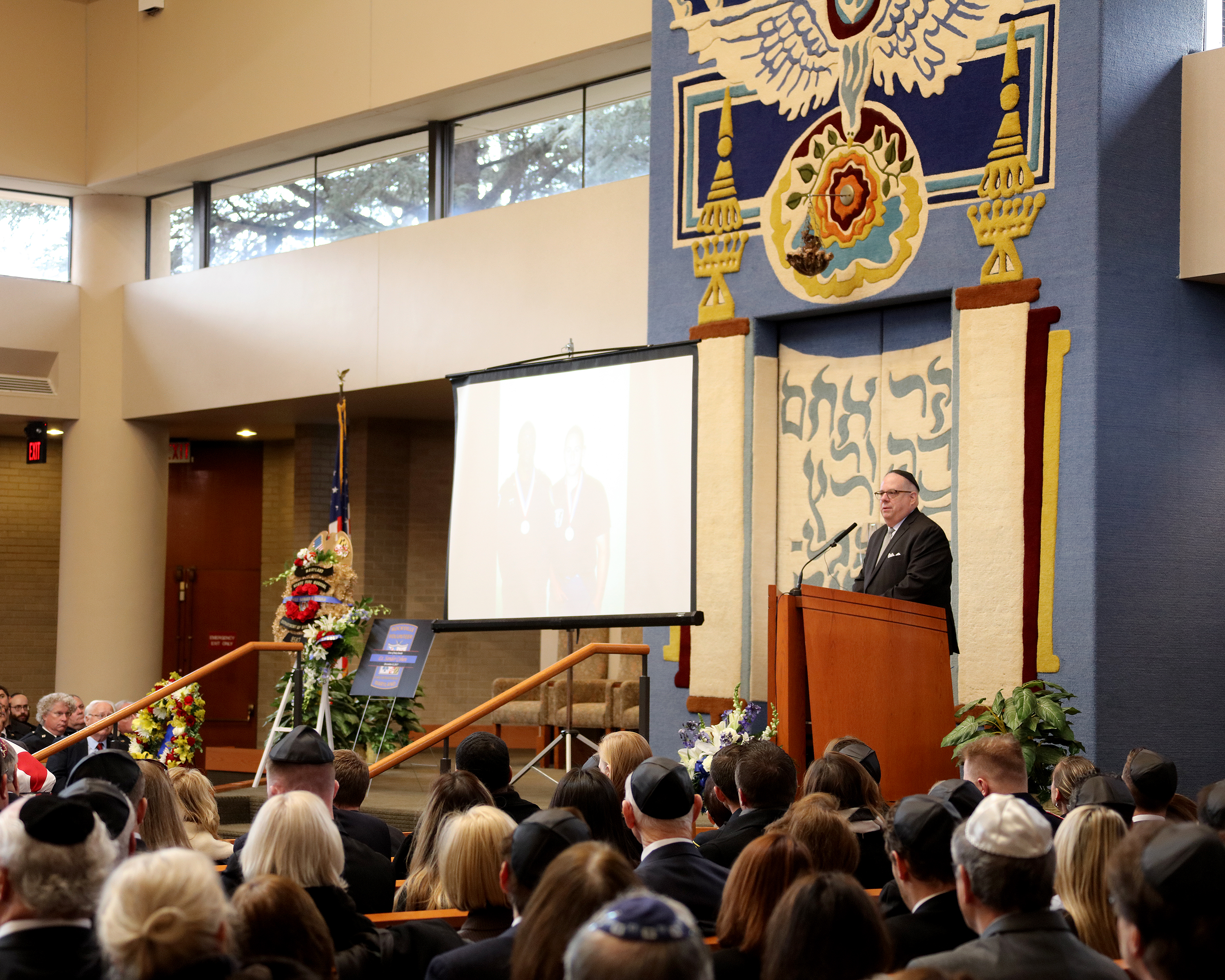
- Synagogue interior with Governor Hogan, in 2017

- Location within Maryland

Religion
- Affiliation: Conservative Judaism
- Ecclesiastical or organisational status: Synagogue
- Leadership: Rabbi Michael J. Safra; Rabbi Mitchell Berkowitz
- Status: Active

Location
- Location: Rockville, Maryland
- Country: United States

Architecture
- Type: Synagogue architecture
- Established: 1925 (as a congregation)
- Completed: c. 1970

Specifications
- Capacity: 3,500 worshippers
- Interior area: 125,000 square feet (11,600 m^{2})

Website
- bnaiisraelcong.org

B'nai Israel Congregation is a Conservative Jewish egalitarian congregation and synagogue, located in Rockville, Maryland, in the United States. B'nai Israel's mission is to study in the Jewish tradition, worship God, commit to social action, and address the needs of the Jewish people locally, in Israel, and worldwide. The congregation consists of 1,200 families.

== Clergy and leadership ==
Logo of B'nai Israel Congregation

B'nai Israel's clergy includes Rabbi Michael J. Safra, Rabbi Mitchell H. Berkowitz, Cantor Josh C. Perlman, and Cantor Sarah Bolts. Rabbi Matthew H. Simon and Rabbi Jonathan A. Schnitzer both serve as Rabbi emeritus, and Cantor Robert Kieval is Cantor emeritus. Marla Schulman serves as B'nai Israel's president.

== Religious programs and activities ==
B'nai Israel holds religious services, including morning and evening minyan, Shabbat services, and holiday services.

B'nai Israel's preschool has a religious curriculum and enrolls children between 15 months and 5 years of age. B'nai Israel's religious school has classes for students in kindergarten through eleventh grade. Classes are held on Sundays and weekday evenings.

Lectures and classes are held during the year at B'nai Israel to educate Jewish adults. Social action programs at B'nai Israel include school supply drives, fall and winter clothing drives, and blood drives.

== Award ==
In 2011, United Synagogue of Conservative Judaism's Solomon Schechter Awards presented B'nai Israel with a gold award for Jewish education for adults. United Synagogue of Conservative Judaism noted B'nai Israel's "varied courses and programs provide learners with a greater appreciation for the scope of Jewish history and thought and offer conceptual grounding in many key aspects of Judaism and Jewish life."

== History ==
B'nai Israel was founded in 1925.

In 1936, B'nai Israel was led by Rabbi Henry Segal and was located at 14th Street and Emerson Street NW in the Washington, D.C., neighborhood of Sixteenth Street Heights. Membership increased, and B'nai Israel moved to a larger space at 16th Street and Allison Streets NW, which was also in Sixteenth Street Heights. In 1952, B'nai Israel moved a few blocks away, to 16th Street and Crittenden Street NW. At the time, B'nai Israel's members generally lived nearby.

By the mid-1960s, however, many of B'nai Israel's members had moved away from the neighborhood, and those who had stayed felt unsafe in the neighborhood. The synagogue was vandalized, and some members said they were afraid to attend services.

In 1970, B'nai Israel bought 14 acres (56,700 m^{2}) on Montrose Road in Rockville, Maryland. The old building was sold to Nineteenth Street Baptist Church for $1.2 million.

Rabbi Matthew H. Simon attended an ecumenical worship service marking the presidential inauguration of George H. W. Bush in 1989. Rabbi Simon read verses from Deuteronomy 10:17–10:18.

In 1989, Rabbi Jonathan Schnitzer left B'nai Abraham Synagogue in Wilson, Pennsylvania, to join B'nai Israel Congregation.

in 2002, B'nai Israel held a forum for candidates for governor of Maryland. Kathleen Kennedy Townsend and Bob Ehrlich both participated, and Barry Sussman served as the forum's moderator.

In 2006, B'nai Israel held a forum for candidates. Participants included Martin O'Malley, candidate for governor of Maryland; Kristen Cox, candidate for lieutenant governor of Maryland; and Ben Cardin, candidate for United States Senate. Jonathan Salant served as moderator.

In 2007, B'nai Israel hosted a forum sponsored by the Jewish Community Relations Council of Greater Washington. Presidential candidate Rudolph W. Giuliani spoke at the forum.

== See also ==
- History of the Jews in Maryland
