= District of Columbia International School =

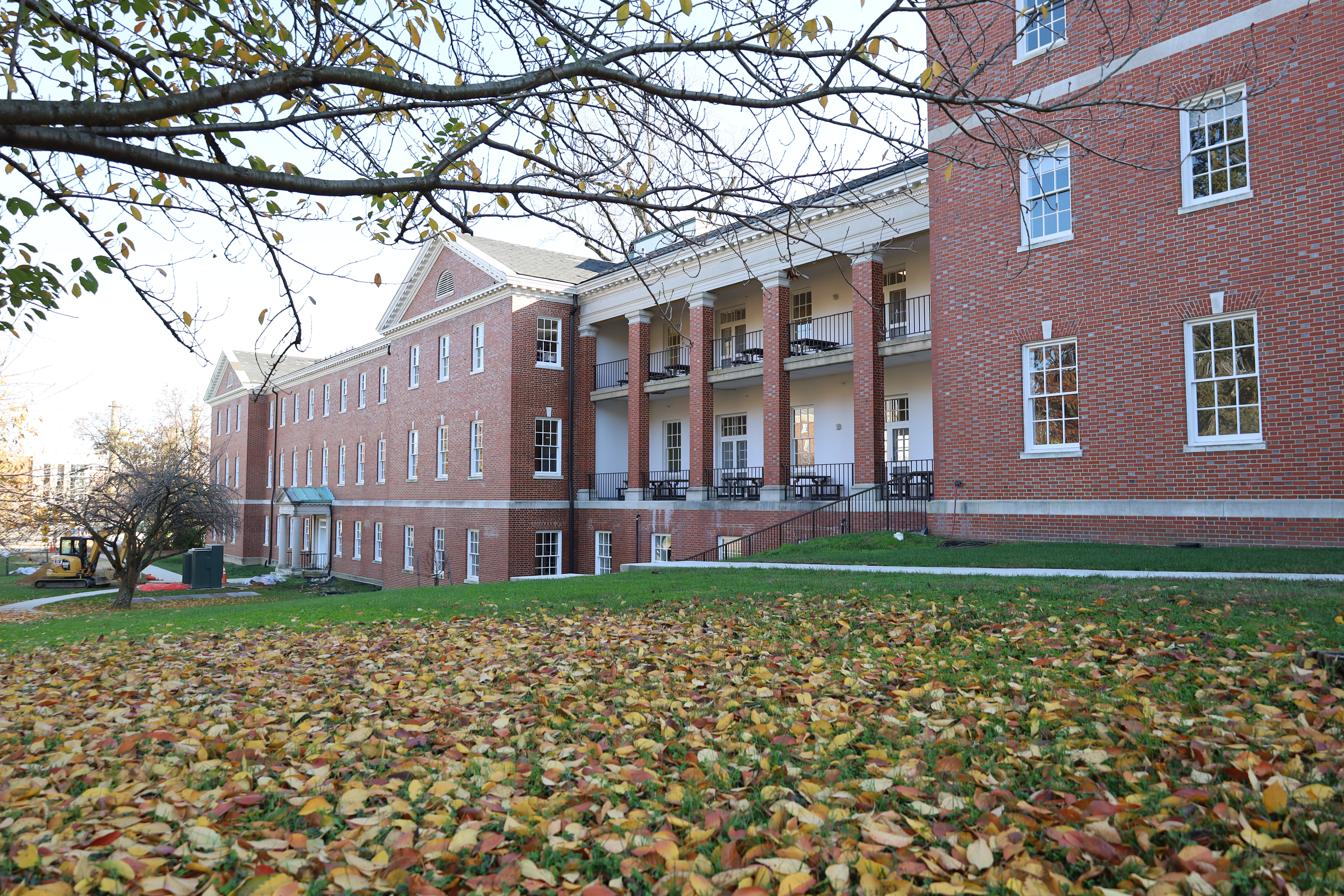
- Delano Hall, the home of the District of Columbia International School

Location
- 1400 Main Dr NW; Washington, D.C. 20012; United States; 38°58′23″N 77°02′03″W

Information
- Type: Charter school
- Established: 2014 (12 years ago)
- Head of school: Mary Shaffner
- Faculty: Approximately 280
- Grades: 6-12
- Enrollment: 1,200
- Average class size: 27
- Colors: Blue and white
- Athletics conference: PCSAA and DCSAA
- Mascot: Three-headed dragon (representing three language tracks)
- Website: dcinternationalschool.org

District of Columbia International School (DCI) is a public charter school in Washington, DC. It offers an International Baccalaureate education to students in grades 6 to 12. Each student learns in a partial language immersion program in Spanish, French or Chinese.

It is overseen by the District of Columbia Public Charter School Board.

== History and campus ==
DCI was founded in 2014 by five elementary charter schools with language immersion instruction models: Latin American Montessori Bilingual Public Charter School, Washington Yu Ying Public Charter School, Elsie Whitlow Stokes Community Freedom Public Charter School, Mundo Verde Public Charter School, and DC Bilingual Public Charter School. The schools joined forces to allow their students to continue their language education into middle and high school.

Graduating fifth grade students in from those five schools get first preference for admission to DCI through the city's lottery system for charter and public schools.

At the time the member schools first conceived of DCI, D.C.'s charter school law did not allow for such a model that would give rising fifth grades preference in admission to the school. The D.C. Council amended its charter school law in June 2014 to authorize the school and allow it to obtain city funding.

After initially operating out of temporary space in the Mount Pleasant neighborhood, in 2017, the school moved into its permanent campus, the Delano Hall building of the former Walter Reed Army Medical Center. The new building, a former dormitory for nurses, can accommodate up to 1,450 students.

== Student body ==
DCI is a diverse school with no majority race, consisting of about 40% African-American, 40% Hispanic, and 15% Caucasian students in the 2018-19 school year. 8.3% are English language learners and 51.6% are economically disadvantaged.

== Academic program ==
Students in grades 6-10 follow the International Baccalaureate Middle Years Program and students in grades 11-12 can either study for the International Baccalaureate Diploma or International Baccalaureate Career-related Program. All students choose to focus on Chinese, French, or Spanish, and can pursue the IB Bilingual Diploma.

=== Results ===
In 2019, the DCI middle and high school were both rated Tier 1 by the District of Columbia Public Charter School Board. The same year, 61% of DCI students achieved proficiency in the English Language Arts/Literacy section of the PARCC exam and 41% achieved proficiency in the math section.
