= Perry H. Carson =

American politician

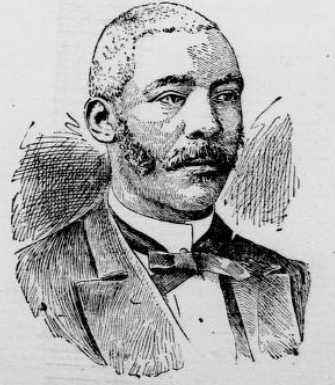
- Born: April 13, 1842; Princess Anne, Somerset County, Maryland
- Died: October 31, 1909 (aged 67); Washington, D.C.

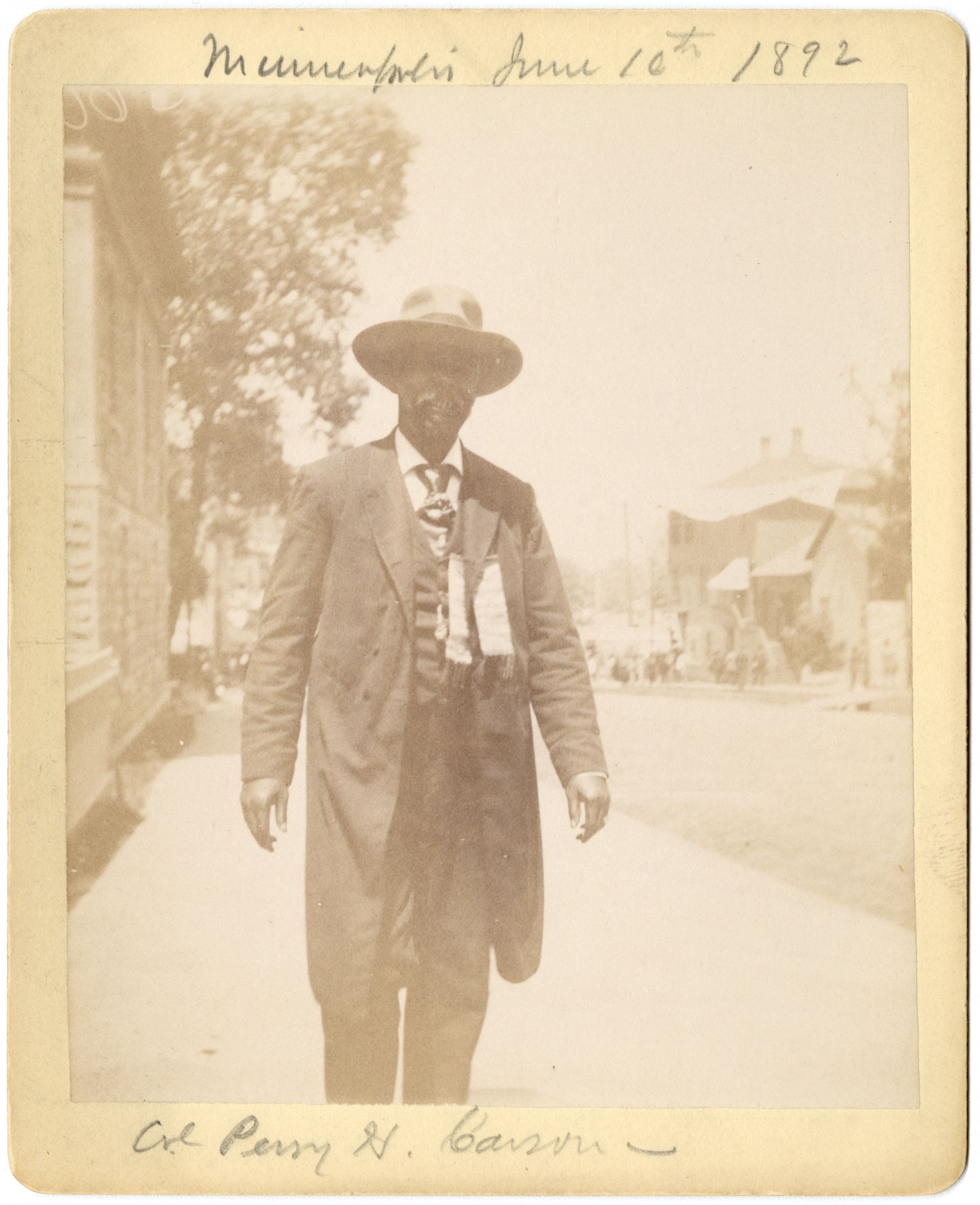
Carson at the 1892 Republican National Convention in Minneapolis

Perry H. Carson (13 April 1842 – 31 October 1909), known as Colonel Carson, was a prominent African-American political leader in Washington, D.C. in the late 19th century. He was called the "silver haired giant," and his reputation was to have rattled the whites and elite blacks of Washington. Known as the voice of the working black Washingtonians, Perry spoke out for his people, acted upon his beliefs, and represented low-income black residents at multiple Republican National Conventions.

== Background ==
In 1842, Perry H. Carson was born free in Princess Anne, Somerset County, Maryland. As a teenager in Baltimore, Maryland, Carson assisted abolitionists as they aided fleeing slaves. He was arrested, but later released. Beginning in 1864, Carson supported the Union war effort by doing odd jobs for the army, and ultimately became a volunteer.

After the Civil War, Carson moved to Washington and quickly became a leader in the District's African-American community. He worked as a bodyguard for Mayor Sayles Bowen and a trusted messenger to Alexander Shepherd, exposing him to important Washington area politicians. Carson drew the majority of his support from working-class black community. Carson gathered considerable political capital, as evidenced by his presidency of the District's Blaine Invincible Republican Club and extended tenure as the District's representative to the Republican National Convention. Carson was known as one of the foremost political 'boss[es]' of black Washington. Carson was particularly noticeable in the city for his unique physique. Standing over six feet tall, weighing around 235 pounds, and weighing his signature silver hair, Carson was known as the 'Tall Black Oak of the Potomac'. Carson was a member of St. Paul AME Church.

== Political life ==
With a desire to act and make a difference in the lives of the black Washingtonians, Carson organized the "Boys in Blue," a regiment of local black men to defend the black residents from the nearby Irish men that saw the working class blacks as a threat to their own jobs and freedom. This regiment gave Perry Carson the name of "Colonel." The local black regiment was once just an idea, however as the people heard of Carson's plan, they supported it and the plan was adopted. Calling on the local black people, Carson expressed his intention for 1,500 colored men filled with patriotism to come out and meet with the selection committee and Carson himself. Support for the black regiment was wide spread, even coming from Howard University with about fifty students willing to volunteer their time to the president in a fight for democracy.

Carson kept D.C. "stirred up," from uniting the local poor blacks to demand equality, to protesting the Jim Crow laws on his own. While Jim Crow laws on streetcars were initiated in Maryland, defining a "colored" section to black riders, no one in Washington thought this state law would affect them in the District region. While boarding a train in the District, the driver ordered Carson to the colored section, Carson argued that he was in DC and the Jim Crow laws don't apply. The streetcar operator countered, explaining that he didn't know, nor did he care, but the colored folks would have to use the Jim Crow car. Not wanting to argue on he headed to his race specified section. Although he did not make a fuss over the Jim Crow laws in that instance, he was well known as the "shrewd, big-lunged boss at Washington," as he rattled politicians in his fight for a delegation spot at the Republican National Conventions.

Along with the local black regiment, Colonel Carson created the Blaine Invincible Club, which was focused on the interest of the race, the Republican Party, as it was the first Republican club in Washington, and helping those in need. Carson was named the president the Blaine Invincible Republican Club. Carson used his influence as one of the city's foremost Republicans to become the District's representative to the Republican National Convention. Carson served as the city's delegate from 1880 to 1900. In one of the times of selecting a delegate to go to the convention, a tribute to Perry Carson was submitted to the Washington Post. The writer proclaimed that no other delegate could hold the same amount of influence as Perry who had attended the conventions many times and was regarded as "the most influential of his race," and "a leader in every effort for the benefit and advancement of his people." Perry Carson was known to be "deeply interested in the prosperity of our city and can be depended upon to advance its interest in every way," therefore gaining a supportive backing from the black working class.

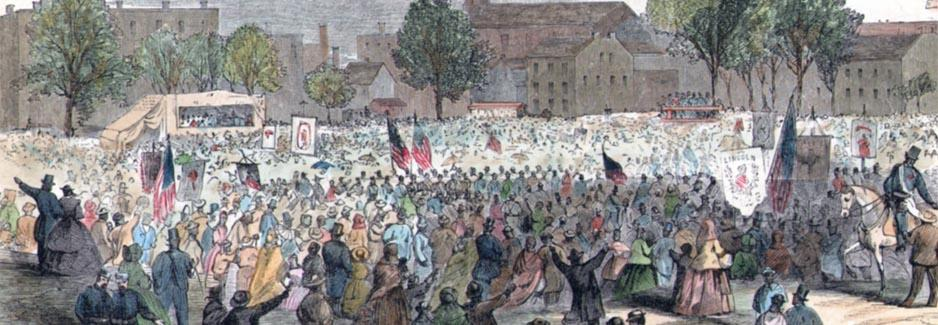
Emancipation Day Celebrations in Washington, DC thrived under Carson's leadership.

Carson's legacy in the District is a bit obscured. Due in large part to the disfranchisement of the District, Carson was never able to hold elected office that matched his political influence. As a delegate to the Republican National Convention, he won praise and acclaim, but was not able to directly effect policy. Carson was an important advocate for the black community, representing the most needy and least skilled members of the black working class. Although he faced contemporary criticism for some of his tactics, Carson dedication to the less fortunate members of the black community was evident by the time of his death. Carson faced political opposition from blacks like Calvin Chase, who claimed Carson made the political condition more difficult for black by reinforcing existing stereotypes. Chase and Carson battle for political control of Washington's black community for three decades. Carson and Chase not only competed to represent the District at national conventions, they also conflicted over the proper way to celebrate Emancipation Day. The Emancipation Day celebration grew under Carson's supervision.

At the age of 65, Carson faced political pressure to resign his post in the commissioner government of the District. The sitting commissioners hoped to remove a potential political opponent by pushing Carson to resign. In response to demands to take a pay cut, Carson retired from the political arena. Just a year and a half later, the Colonel caught pneumonia and died in his house in the District. When he died in 1909, even his enemies called him an "intrepid fighter."
