= Fort View Apartments =

- U.S. National Register of Historic Places
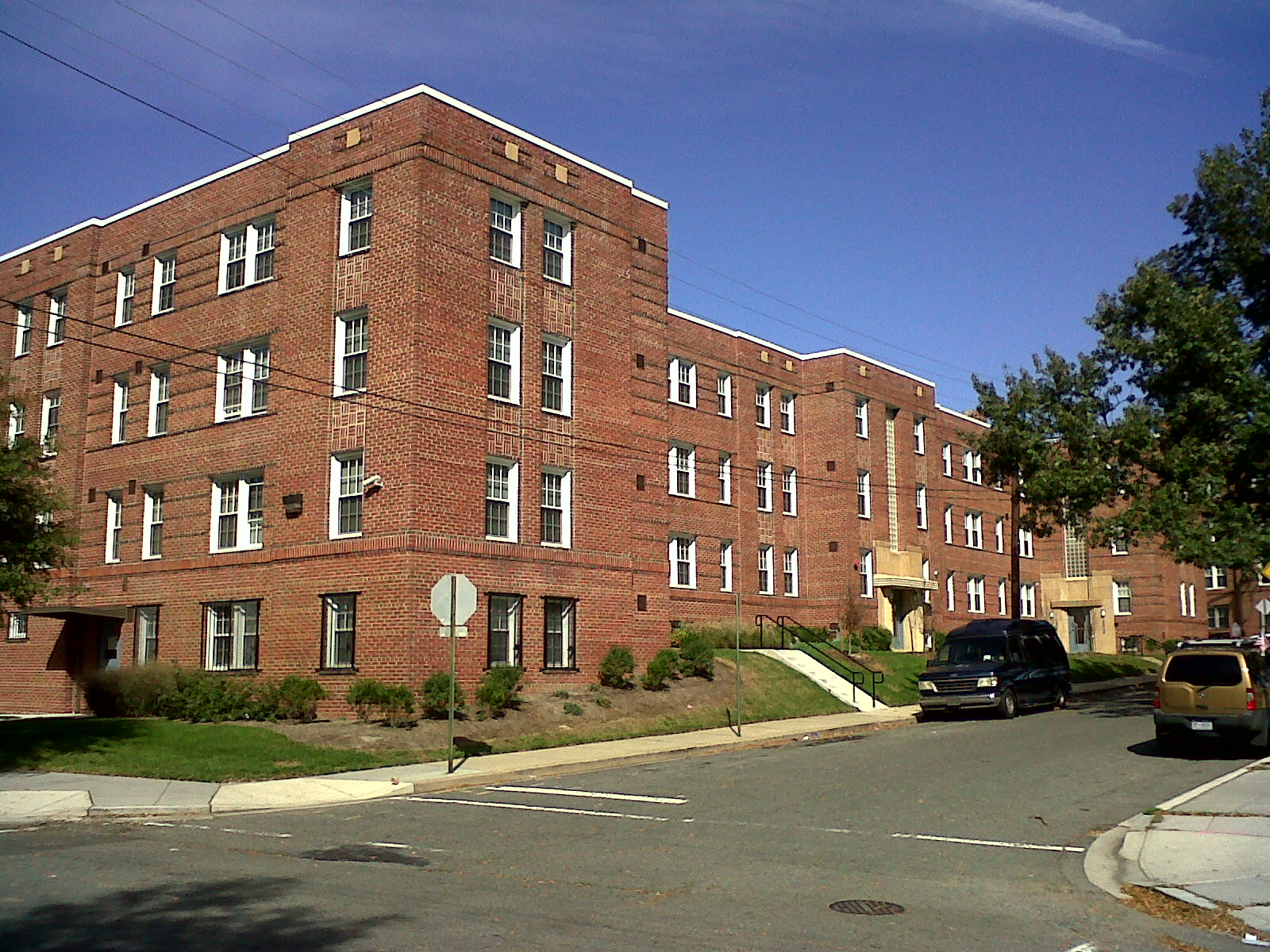

- Location within District of Columbia
- Location: 6000-6020 and 6030-6050 13th Place, N.W. Washington, D.C.
- Coordinates: 38°57′48.86″N 77°1′51.51″W
- Built: 1939
- Architect: George T. Santmyers
- MPS: Apartment Buildings in Washington, DC, MPS
- NRHP reference No.: 09001264
- Added to NRHP: 2010

Fort View Apartments, formerly known as Fort Stevens Place, is an historic structure located in the Brightwood neighborhood of Washington, D.C. The apartments were designed by architect George T. Santmyers in the modernist architectural style with some art deco elements. They overlook Fort Stevens Park. Completed in 1939, the apartments originally rented for between $47.50 and $73.50 per month.

Fort View Apartments were listed on the National Register of Historic Places in 2010. The 62-unit complex sat empty for a number of years until it was redeveloped for over $19 million. The project was completed in 2011.
