= Brightwood (Washington, D.C.) =

- Neighborhood of Washington, D.C.
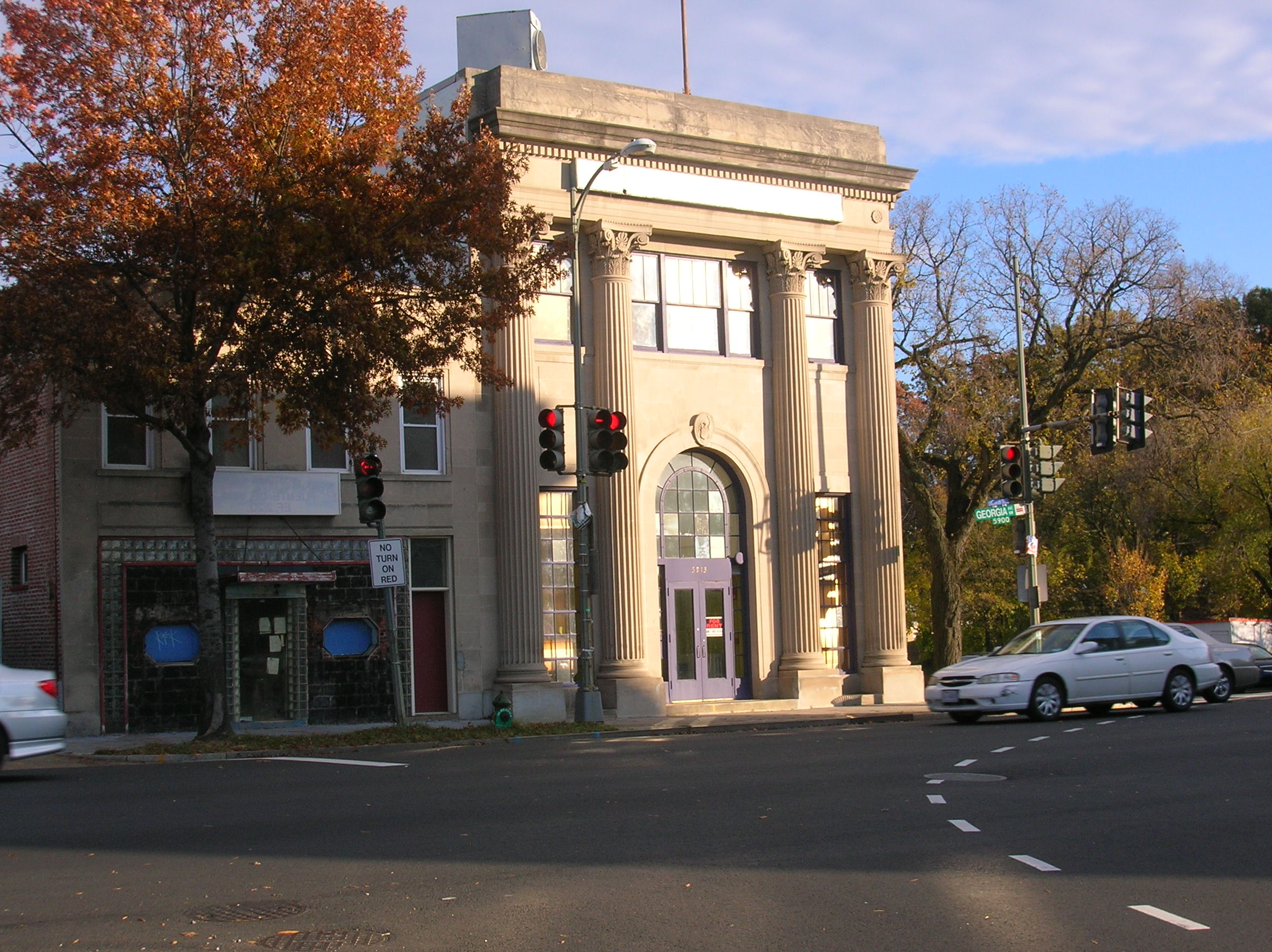
- Bank of Brightwood building

- Map of Washington, D.C., with Brightwood highlighted in red
- Coordinates: 38.9612°N 77.0275°W
- Country: United States
- District: Washington, D.C.
- Ward: Ward 4

Government
  - Councilmember: Janeese Lewis George
- Postal code: ZIP code

Brightwood is a neighborhood in the northwestern quadrant of Washington, D.C. Brightwood is part of Ward 4.

== Geography ==
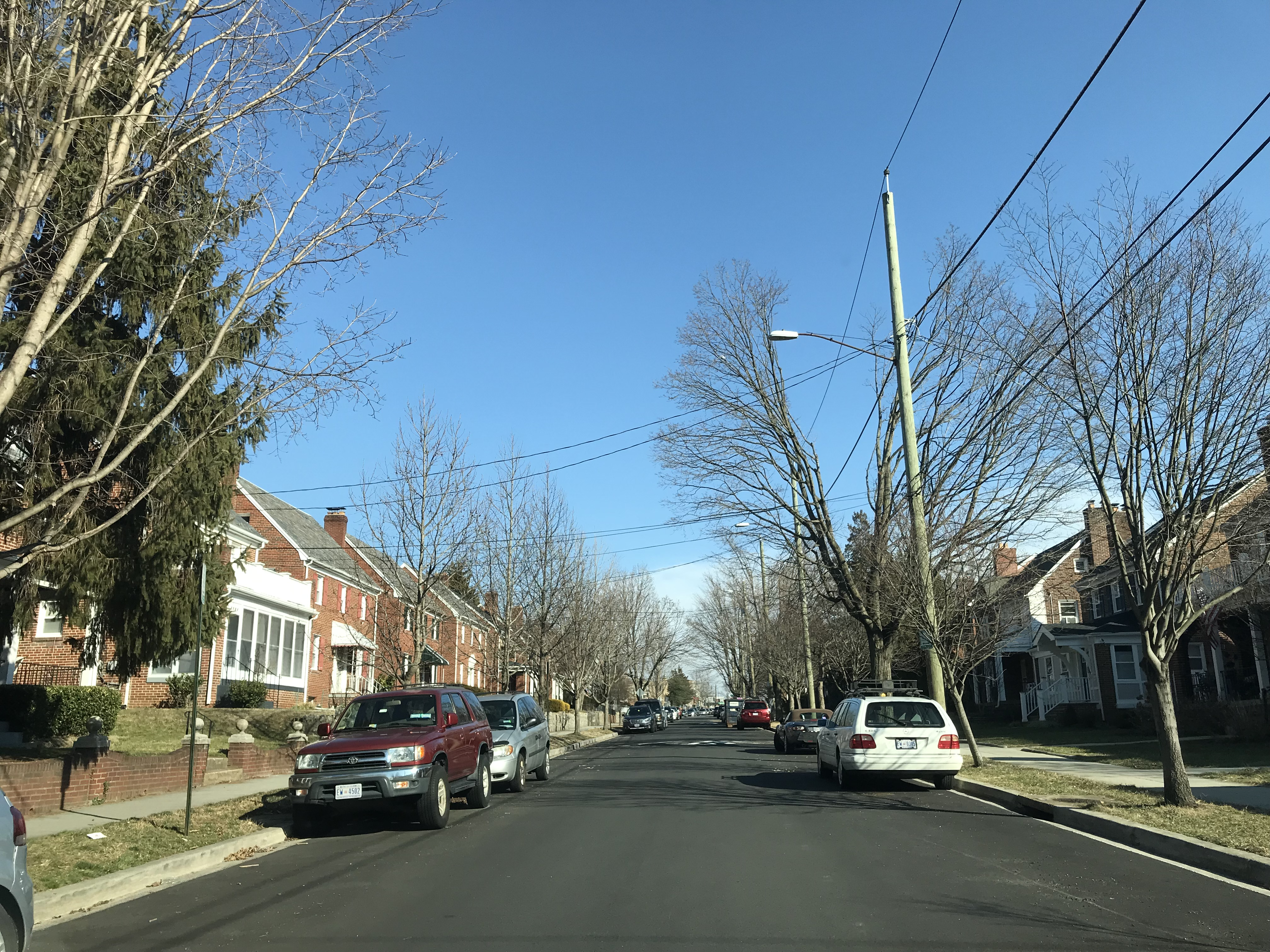
Intersection of 14th St. and Tuckerman St. NW, Brightwood, February 2018

The boundaries of Brightwood have varied over the years. In the mid-nineteenth century, the name generally encompassed the region north of Brightwood Park, west of Fort Totten, east of Rock Creek, and south of the Maryland line. Today, the Brightwood Community Association, an association of residents and business owners from the western part of Brightwood, define the neighborhood's boundaries as Walter Reed Army Medical Center and Aspen Street to the north, 16th Street and Rock Creek Park to the west, Georgia Avenue to the east, and Kennedy Street to the south. Other widely accepted variations bound Brightwood on the east by 5th Street. The DC Government's Citizens Atlas bounds the Brightwood Assessment Neighborhood to the south at Missouri Avenue. Nearby neighborhoods include Shepherd Park and Takoma to the north, Manor Park to the east, and Sixteenth Street Heights and Petworth to the south. At the 2010 census, the neighborhood had 11,242 residents.

Much of the retail stores in the neighborhood sit along Georgia Avenue. The neighborhood has no Metrorail stations, although the Takoma Metrorail station and Fort Totten Metro Station are within walking distance. Several Metrobus routes serve the community.

Brightwood is at an elevation of 292 feet (89 m).

== History ==
=== Early history ===
The land was part of a land patent called White Mill Seat in 1756. The name was changed to Peter's Mill Seat in 1800. Later, the area was called Crystal Springs, named after the pure water that flowed from several nearby springs. One of the springs was located near the modern-day intersection of Fourteenth and Kennedy streets, which still flows in the present day, creating a constant stream of water on the sidewalk of the western side of Fourteenth Street, across from the Metrobus building. The area had many chestnut trees, and it was considered a place to enjoy with family. The Passenger Railroad Company ran hourly stagecoaches from Fourteenth Street and Boundary Avenue to the springs, charging 25 cents per ride.

The area was later known as Brighton, but residents decided to change the name to Brightwood in the 1840s because the postal service frequently confused it with Brighton, Maryland. Archibald White and Louis Brunett are generally given credit for the new name.

=== Transportation ===
Before 1889, Brightwood was so far outside the center city that the only transportation to it was a rickety horse-drawn cart driven by an African American man known by the name of Cherry. Most of the land north of Rock Creek Church Road was farmland, although there were a few clusters of houses around Brightwood and Takoma Park.

In 1899, the Brightwood Railway Company extended a streetcar line along Brightwood Avenue (now called Georgia Avenue) from Rock Creek Church Road to Brightwood. The streetcar was only of some help to residents, as the streetcar line was famously unreliable. The streetcar often came off its tracks, and passengers were asked to help push it back onto its tracks. Some residents called it the G.O.P. (Get Out and Push) line.

The Brightwood Citizens' Association was founded on March 17, 1891, the first neighborhood association founded anywhere in Northwest D.C. James L. Norris was its first president. The organization's initial purpose was to advocate for more reliable transportation to Brightwood.

=== Emory United Methodist Church ===
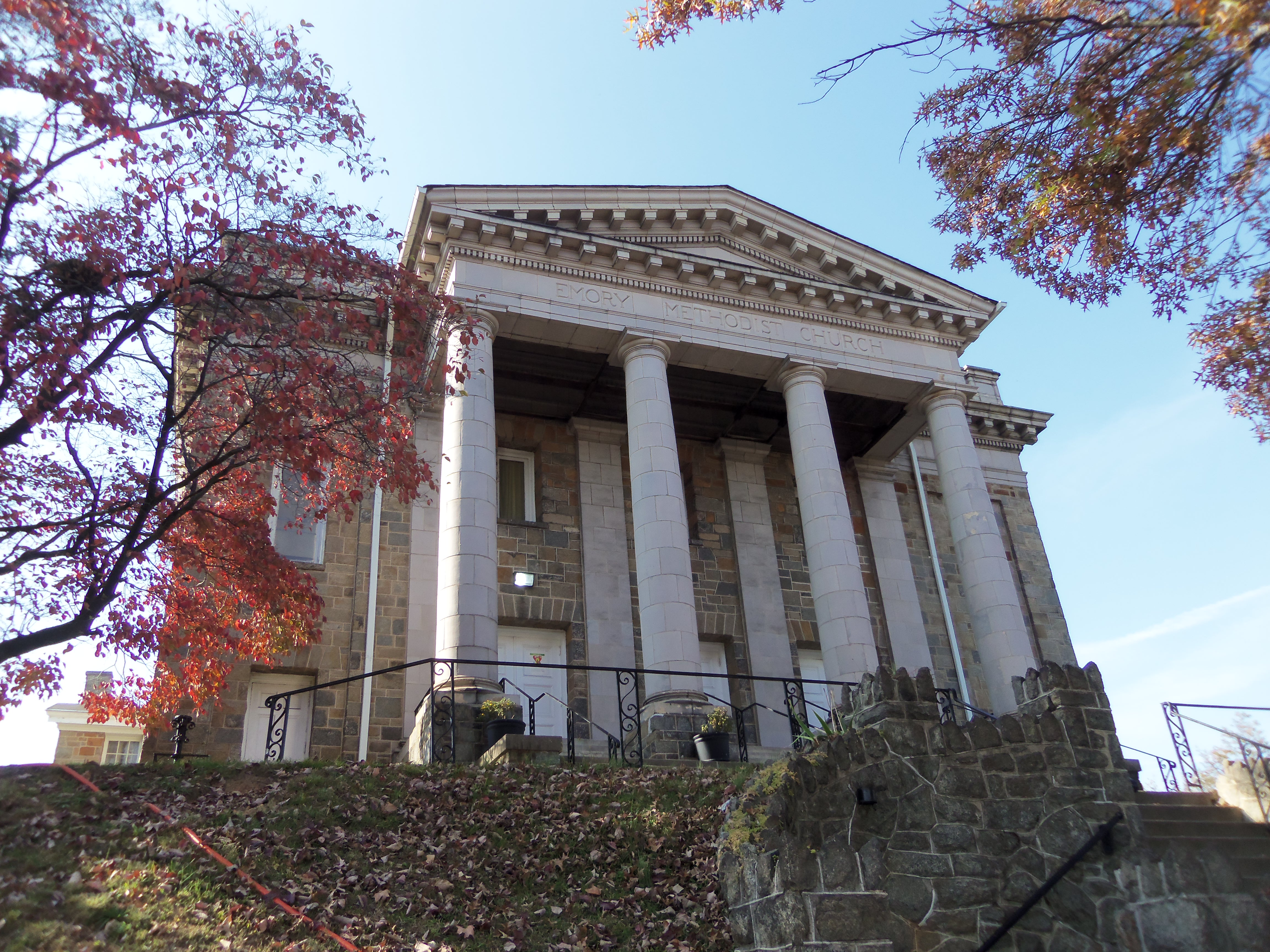
Emory United Methodist Church

Emory M.E. Church was built in 1832 when A.G. Pierce donated a half-acre of land in to build a church and a school. The original building stood two stories high: a first floor of logs for the school; and a second story of frame construction for worship, with a separate entrance from the outside. Black worshippers sat in a gallery. The church was named for John Emory of Queen Anne's County, Maryland, who had just been ordained bishop. Bishop Emory paid the $200 salary of the preacher's salary. In 1856, the 72-person congregation replaced the building with a red-brick structure that was torn down in 1861 for Union Army fortifications. A stone church was built in 1870. The present-day building, at 6100 Georgia Avenue NW, was erected in 1921. The churchyard was originally used as a cemetery, customary use of such land in those days. Some of the deceased were later moved to Rock Creek Cemetery.

From the late 1970s to 1992, Emory's membership sharply declined, and the church was sold on almost two occasions. In 1992, Rev. Joseph W. Daniels Jr. came to Emory to serve as its part-time pastor. At the time, Emory's membership was 85 with an average worship size of 55 people. Under Daniels, average weekly attendance has grown from 55 people to more than over 400. The United Methodist Church organization has given Emory the "Kim Jefferson Northeast Jurisdictional Award" for effective urban ministry and designated it one of the 25 Congregational Resource Centers in the "Strengthening the Black Church for the 21st Century" effort.

=== Fort Stevens ===
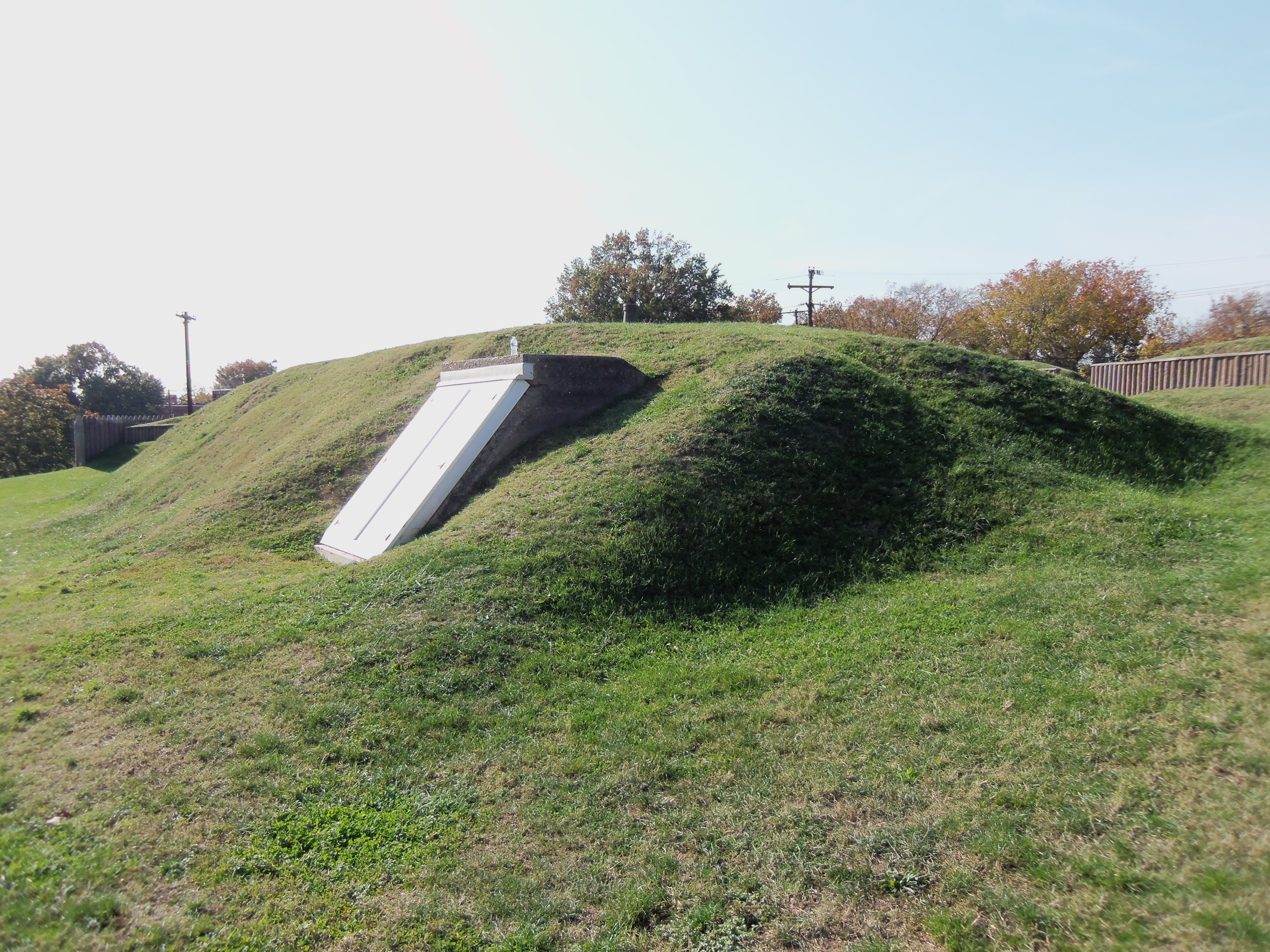
Fort Stevens recreation

Brightwood is home to Fort Stevens, a Civil War fortification built by the Union Army as part of the defenses of Washington, D.C. The fort was built on the site of Emory Church, which was torn down and its bricks were used for the fort and baking ovens. A nearby log building used by the church was also torn down and its logs used to build a guardhouse for unruly soldiers. After Emory Church's congregation petitioned Congress for compensation for the torn-down church, Congress appropriated $412 for rent for use of the grounds.

Fort Stevens was attacked by 20,000 Confederate soldiers led by General Jubal Early during the Battle of Fort Stevens on July 11 and July 12, 1864. The Union soldiers successfully repulsed the Confederate attack.

Following petitions from veterans formerly stationed at the fort, Congress established a park at the site and a memorial plaque.

Forty soldiers are buried in the nearby historic Battleground National Cemetery. An 1885 police census documented the population of Brightwood as 104.

=== Brightwood Trotting Park ===
Brightwood was home to a horse racetrack originally named Crystal Springs Park, then Piney Branch Park, and finally Brightwood Trotting Park. A tavern was nearby, operated by Frederick G. Rohr and later by his widow Annie M. Rohr. It was common for people to watch the races, swim in nearby Rock Creek, and have a picnic lunch. After many years, Brightwood Trotting Park greatly decreased in popularity. During its last year of operation, it was primarily used for racing mules. The course was closed in 1909 in order to make way for the extension of Sixteenth Street.

=== Other historic sites ===
Moreland's Tavern sat at the corner of modern-day Georgia and Missouri avenues before the Civil War. The building later became the Brightwood Club House, known for being a nice place to ride a horse and enjoy a drink. It eventually became the site of a Masonic Temple.

Brightwood was also the location, in 1909, of the first successful flight by a helicopter in the United States, built by Emile Berliner. His Gyro Motor Company building, which has been nominated for inclusion on the National Register of Historic Places, still stands at 770-774 Girard Street NW.

The Sheridan Theater, a motion-picture theater, opened at 6217 Georgia Avenue NW in 1937. The first feature was Sing Me A Love Song.

Other historic sites include Engine Company 22 on Georgia Avenue NW, Fort View Apartments, which overlook the site of Fort Stevens and are listed on the National Register of Historic Places, and the Military Road School, which opened in 1864 and was one of the first schools in Washington to open after Congress authorized the education of African Americans.

=== Redevelopment ===
The 21st century brought redevelopment of the commercial area along Georgia Avenue.

Condominiums were completed at the corner of Georgia and Missouri Avenues in 2006. A restaurant, Meridian, operated on the first floor from January to June 2008, reopened as Brightwood Bistro in August 2008, and closed in 2012.

The corner of Georgia Avenue and Peabody Street was for years the site of the Curtis Chevrolet dealership and a car barn built in 1909. In 2007, Foulger-Pratt Development Inc., the company that redeveloped much of downtown Silver Spring, filed plans to build a new building with 400 residential units (up to 8 percent of which would be reserved as affordable), restaurants, retail, and underground parking at the site. The D.C. Historical Preservation Society requested that Foulger-Pratt's design incorporate rather than demolish the car barn, for which it planned to seek historical designation. In response, Foulger-Pratt proposed to raze only the rear of the structure and renovate the front. Groundbreaking was anticipated in summer 2010 but the plans fell through. In November 2010, Walmart announced interest in opening a store at the location by 2012. Some neighborhood residents opposed the plan, but the company razed the entire site, including the car barn, in March 2012 and the store opened in December 2013.

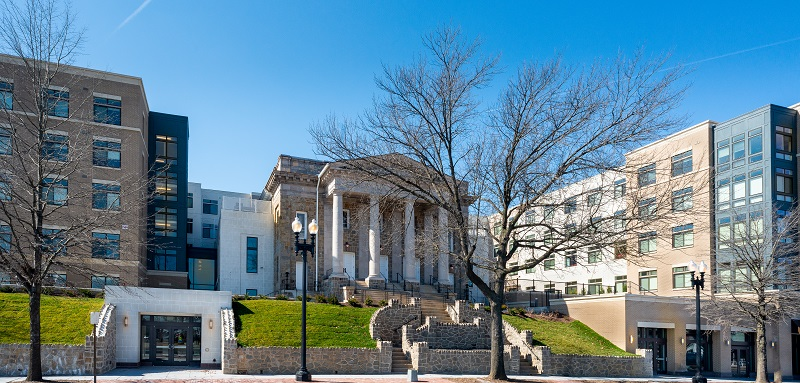
The Emory Beacon Center

The Beacon Center, a $55.3 million redevelopment surrounding the historic Emory United Methodist Church in Brightwood, opened in 2019. The project delivered 99 housing units: 91 reserved for tenants earning 60 percent or less than the area's median income, and eight for people leaving homelessness.

== Demographics ==
=== Immigrant communities ===
Brightwood has the highest percentage of immigrants of any neighborhood in D.C., with immigrants making up nearly 50 percent of the population. Brightwood also has the highest percentage of Ethiopians (16%) and Salvadorans (19%) of any neighborhood; Salvadorans and Ethiopians are the two largest immigrant groups in Washington D.C. Brightwood's immigrant communities are mainly from Ethiopia, Eritrea, El Salvador and the rest of Central America, the Caribbean, and the Philippines.
