= Anthony Bowen =

African-American civic leader in Washington, D.C.

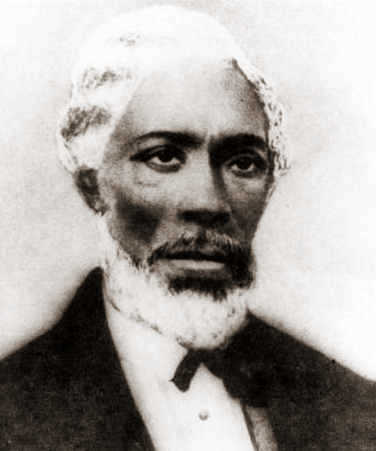
- Portrait of Anthony Bowen taken in the 1860s
- Born: October 8, 1809; Prince George's County, Maryland
- Died: 1871 (aged 61–62); Washington, DC
- Occupation: United States government employee

Rev. Anthony Bowen (1809—1871), was a civic leader among the African-American community in Washington, D.C., and the first African-American employee of the United States Patent Office. Both the Anthony Bowen YMCA and Anthony Bowen Elementary School in Washington, D.C., are named in his honor.

== Early life ==
Born a slave on October 8, 1809, in Prince George's County, MD, on the estate of William Bradley, he was one of four children of Mr. and Mrs. Henry Bowen. In 1826, he bought his freedom and started the first black YMCA. He moved to the Southwest Section of Washington.

== Career ==
Despite having no formal education, Bowen was able to become a clerk in the United States Patent Office. He started as a laborer, moving up to messenger before being named to a clerkship.

In addition to his work, Bowen was a leader of the community. His home in the 900 block of E Street SW was an underground railroad station, and he is said to have built an extra attic in which to hide runaway slaves.

In 1839, he helped set up a meeting house for free blacks at 7th and D Streets SW, and in 1840 he won a contract making and filling seed packets, allowing him to hire many freed blacks to well-paying jobs.

In 1841, he helped form one of the few schools for free blacks, the "Sunday Evening School", in the Wesley Church, now the Metropolitan A.M.E.Z. Church on D Street SW. There such citizens could learn the Bible, reading, writing, arithmetic, and spelling. For some time, the school met in his home, and he served as secretary and superintendent.

In 1853, he organized and became first president of a Young Men's Christian Association for Colored in America.

In 1861, he assisted in the formation of a Colored Building Association to assist freed slaves in obtaining homes. During the Civil War, Bowen encouraged President Abraham Lincoln to enlist African-American soldiers. He led the advocacy for local and federal governments to fund public education for black children, prompting Congress to fund,

in 1868, the first free public school for black children in Southwest Washington, the E Street School. Just prior to his death, Bowen was elected to the 68th Common Council of Washington from 1870-1871. Bowen, an active member of the church, eventually became a reverend.

In 1856, he helped establish the St. Paul A.M.E. Church on E Street SW, which served as an underground railroad station, school for escaped slaves and a house of worship.

He died in July 1871, his funeral attended by many.

The YMCA chapter for African-Americans he founded eventually constructed the Twelfth Street YMCA Building in 1908 and later renamed it the Anthony Bowen YMCA. The structure was declared a National Historic Landmark in 1994 (the new Anthony Bowen YMCA facility is located at 1325 W Street NW).

Upon his death, the E Street School was renamed the Anthony Bowen School, the name carrying on in the new Amidon-Bowen Elementary School, the combination of Bowen with Margaret Amidon Elementary.
