= St. Paul A.M.E. Church (Washington, D.C.) =

African Methodist Episcopal church in Washington, DC, US

St. Paul African Methodist Episcopal Church
- St. Paul AME Church in 2023
- St. Paul African Methodist Episcopal Church
- 38.9499°N 77.0331°W
- Location: Washington, D.C.
- Address: 4901 14th Street NW
- Country: United States
- Denomination: African Methodist Episcopal Church
- Website: stpaulamedc.org

History
- Founded: 25 October 1856
- Founder: Anthony Bowen

Architecture
- Style: Tudor Revival
- Completed: 1914
- Construction cost: $17,000 ($546,429 in 2025)

Specifications
- Capacity: 400
- Materials: Brick, stone

Administration
- District: 2nd Episcopal District

Clergy
- Pastor: Gilbert A. Ruffin Jr.

St. Paul African Methodist Episcopal Church is a historically black Methodist church in the Sixteenth Street Heights neighborhood of Washington, D.C. Founded by civic leader Anthony Bowen in 1856, the church was a station on the Underground Railroad during the American Civil War. It was located in Southwest Washington until urban renewal activity in the mid-20th century forced the church to move. In 1958, it relocated to a Sixteenth Street Heights building that had been built in 1914 for a Methodist church and had also served as a synagogue.

== History ==
St. Paul A.M.E. Church was organized as the E Street Mission in Southwest Washington, D.C., in October 1856 by civic leader Anthony Bowen. It served as an Underground Railroad station during the Civil War. It purchased a site on 8th Street SW in 1859 and built a new building in 1863. In addition to its role in the Underground Railroad, the congregation hosted a school called the Lincoln Institute. A larger church building, seating 250, was completed on the site in 1890. Notable members included Republican political leader Perry H. Carson.

Amid urban renewal in Southwest Washington, St. Paul Church relocated to 4901 14th Street NW in 1958. It purchased the building for $110,000 ($1.23 million in 2025).

The 14th Street building had been completed in 1914 at a cost of $17,000 ($546,429 in 2025) for the Iowa Avenue Methodist Episcopal Church, which had met on the site in a temporary building for five years prior. In 1923, the Iowa Avenue congregation merged with the Golden Rule Society to form Hamline Methodist Episcopal Church; the combined congregation relocated to a larger building on 16th Street NW in 1926. In 1929, the 14th Street building was sold for $25,000 ($468,750 in 2025) and rededicated as the home of the four-year-old B'nai Israel Congregation. The building became home to Congregation Talmud Torah in 1951.

== Architecture ==
St. Paul's 14th Street building features dressed red brick with white stone trim. The sanctuary seats 400. The lower level of the church includes an auditorium, dining room, commercial kitchen and classrooms.
