= Twelfth Street YMCA Building =

- U.S. National Register of Historic Places
- U.S. National Historic Landmark
- U.S. Historic district – Contributing property
- D.C. Inventory of Historic Sites
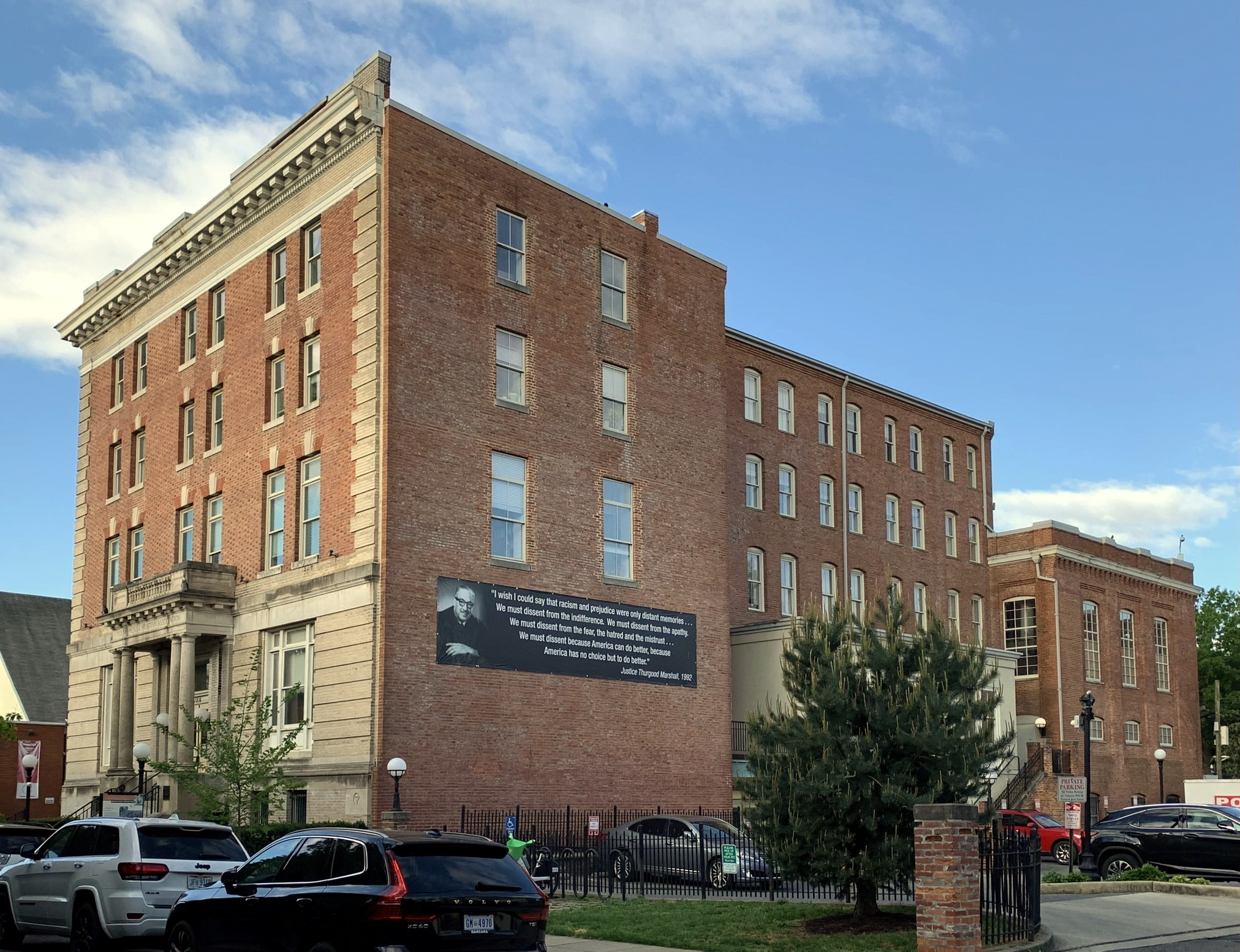
- Twelfth Street YMCA Building in 2023

- Location within Washington, D.C. Location within the United States
- Location: 1816 12th St. NW, Washington, D.C.
- Coordinates: 38°54′53.8″N 77°01′41.8″W
- Area: .395 acres (1,600 m^{2})
- Built: 1908-12
- Architect: William Sidney Pittman
- Architectural style: Renaissance Revival
- Part of: Greater U Street Historic District (ID93001129)
- NRHP reference No.: 83003523

Significant dates
- Added to NRHP: October 3, 1983
- Designated NHL: October 12, 1994
- Designated DCIHS: April 29, 1975

Twelfth Street YMCA Building, also known as the Anthony Bowen YMCA, is a historic building in Washington, DC, that housed the first African American chapter of YMCA, founded in 1853 by Anthony Bowen. The building opened in 1912 as the Twelfth Street YMCA and was later renamed the Anthony Bowen YMCA in honor of its founder. The building is located at 1816 12th Street NW in the U Street Corridor (Cardozo/Shaw) neighborhood of Washington, D.C.

The YMCA closed in 1982 because of financial difficulties and declining membership. The building was reopened on February 20, 2000, as the Thurgood Marshall Center in honor of the first African American Associate Justice to serve on the United States Supreme Court. The center now serves as a community center for residents of the U Street Corridor and Shaw neighborhoods.

The Renaissance Revival building was designed by William Sidney Pittman, one of the United States' first African American architects and a son-in-law of Booker T. Washington. It was declared a National Historic Landmark in 1994 and is a contributing property to the Greater U Street Historic District.

== Description ==
The Twelfth Street YMCA Building is located on the west side of 12th Street NW, between S and T Streets in Washington, DC. It is a four-story rectangular building constructed of red brick with gray brick and limestone trim. Its main entrance features a Tuscan-style portico, while the exterior includes decorative brickwork, limestone bands, and a cornice along the roofline. The upper floors have red brick walls with gray brick accents at the corners. Windows are arranged in pairs with limestone keystones.

The Twelfth Street YMCA Building had several spaces for recreation and community activities. These included an indoor swimming pool in the basement, a gymnasium on the first floor, and a lounge with a fireplace. The basement also originally contained a bowling alley. The building included 54 sleeping rooms to accommodate visitors. The building also had offices and rooms on the upper floors. Photographs taken in October 1979 show what these spaces looked like before the YMCA closed in 1982.

== History ==
=== Early history and Anthony Bowen's legacy ===
In 1853, Anthony Bowen founded the Colored Young Men's Christian Association in Washington, DC, one year after the city's first YMCA opened. Bowen had been born into slavery in Maryland and later purchased his freedom. He became a religious leader and educator who worked to improve educational and social opportunities for African Americans.

Bowen established the organization to provide African Americans with opportunities for education, recreation, and community support at a time when they were excluded from Washington's white YMCA. The larger YMCA organization initially refused to provide financial assistance, so Bowen used his own money to support the association. For nearly four decades, the organization operated in rented or donated spaces.

Racial segregation continued within the national YMCA organization into the twentieth century. African American men were generally excluded from White YMCA branches, while separate Black YMCA associations provided educational, recreational, and social opportunities for their communities.

=== Growth and construction of the Twelfth Street YMCA ===
The organization struggled financially in its early years and was not formally incorporated until 1892. In 1891, the organization moved into a rented building on 11th Street NW, but later relocated soon after due to declining membership. By 1904, membership had grown to approximately 600 people.

After a membership drive revitalized the organization, it secured a pledge from John D. Rockefeller Sr. for $25,000, which was matched by fundraising from across the nation's African American community. It is believed to be the first such campaign of its type in that community. Julius Rosenwald also contributed to the building project, although neighborhood residents raised most of the construction funds. This building was completed in 1912 to a design by African-American architect William Sidney Pittman.

The groundbreaking ceremony took place on November 26, 1907, and was attended by hundreds of Black and white people. On November 26, 1908, President Theodore Roosevelt participated in the cornerstone ceremony. The cornerstone contained a Bible, a copy of Roosevelt's speech, local newspapers, YMCA literature, and a YMCA button. Construction was temporarily halted in 1911 before the building was completed and dedicated on May 19, 1912.

Although Bowen died before the building was constructed, the organization continued the work he began.

=== Community life and historical significance ===
On January 1, 1913, six African American international secretaries of the YMCA gathered at the Twelfth Street YMCA in Washington, DC. The meeting included Jesse E. Moorland, who served as senior secretary of the YMCA's Colored Men's Department from 1898 until 1924. Moorland encouraged African American YMCA leaders to expand opportunities for Black men and boys while addressing the challenges of racial segregation.

On January 9, 1914, the permanent organization of Phi Beta Sigma fraternity was established in the Bowen Room of the Twelfth Street YMCA Building. The Twelfth Street YMCA was the first of 25 African American YMCA buildings to receive financial support through Julius Rosenwald's building program. It became a model for fundraising and construction of similar facilities across the country and is recognized as the oldest surviving Rosenwald-funded African American YMCA building.

=== Closure and historic preservation ===
In 1973, the Twelfth Street YMCA was officially renamed Anthony Bowen YMCA in honor of its founder. It closed in 1982, suffering from declining membership and mounting building maintenance costs. Washington DC's congressional delegate Walter E. Fauntroy and Mayor Marion Barry led several protests demanding the reopening of the building due to its historical significance.

On October 3, 1983, the building was listed on the National Register of Historic Places. In 1989, Congressional Delegate Walter E. Fauntroy introduced a bill in Congress to designate the Anthony Bowen Landmark Building (formerly the Anthony Bowen Y.M.C.A.) in Washington, DC, as a national historic site. The building was designated a National Historic Landmark on October 12, 1994.

=== Restoration and reopening ===
Following the YMCA's closure in 1982, efforts began to preserve the historic building and return it to community use. In September 1998, restoration work began to transform the former YMCA into the Thurgood Marshall Center for Service and Heritage. The renovation focused on preserving the building's historic features while creating space for community organizations, educational programs, and social services. The project cost approximately $6.5 million, and the building reopened in February 2000 under the direction of the Thurgood Marshall Center Trust, Incorporated.

=== Relocation of the Anthony Bowen YMCA ===
Following the closure of the historic Twelfth Street YMCA building in 1982, the Anthony Bowen YMCA continued operating from a smaller facility at 1307 W Street NW. In September 1987, YMCA officials announced plans to purchase a larger building at 1325 W Street NW, approximately five blocks north of the original location. The proposed relocation raised concerns among community leaders about potentially displacing organizations already operating in the building, including the Washington, DC Parent Child Center and Cities in the Schools. The Anthony Bowen YMCA reopened at 1325 W Street NW in 1988.

In 2008, the YMCA of Metropolitan Washington partnered with Perseus Realty to redevelop the W Street property as part of a $97 million mixed-use project. The development was planned to include 231 apartments, retail space, and a new 46,000-square-foot YMCA facility. The new facility officially opened in September 2013, featuring a six-lane swimming pool, a rock-climbing wall, exercise studios, and a rooftop terrace. The facility continued the Anthony Bowen YMCA's tradition of providing recreational and community services in Washington DC.

== Notable people ==
- John Warren Davis, fifth president of West Virginia State College, served as the executive secretary of the Twelfth Street YMCA from 1917 to 1919.

== See also ==
- List of National Historic Landmarks in the District of Columbia
