= Military Road School =

- U.S. National Register of Historic Places
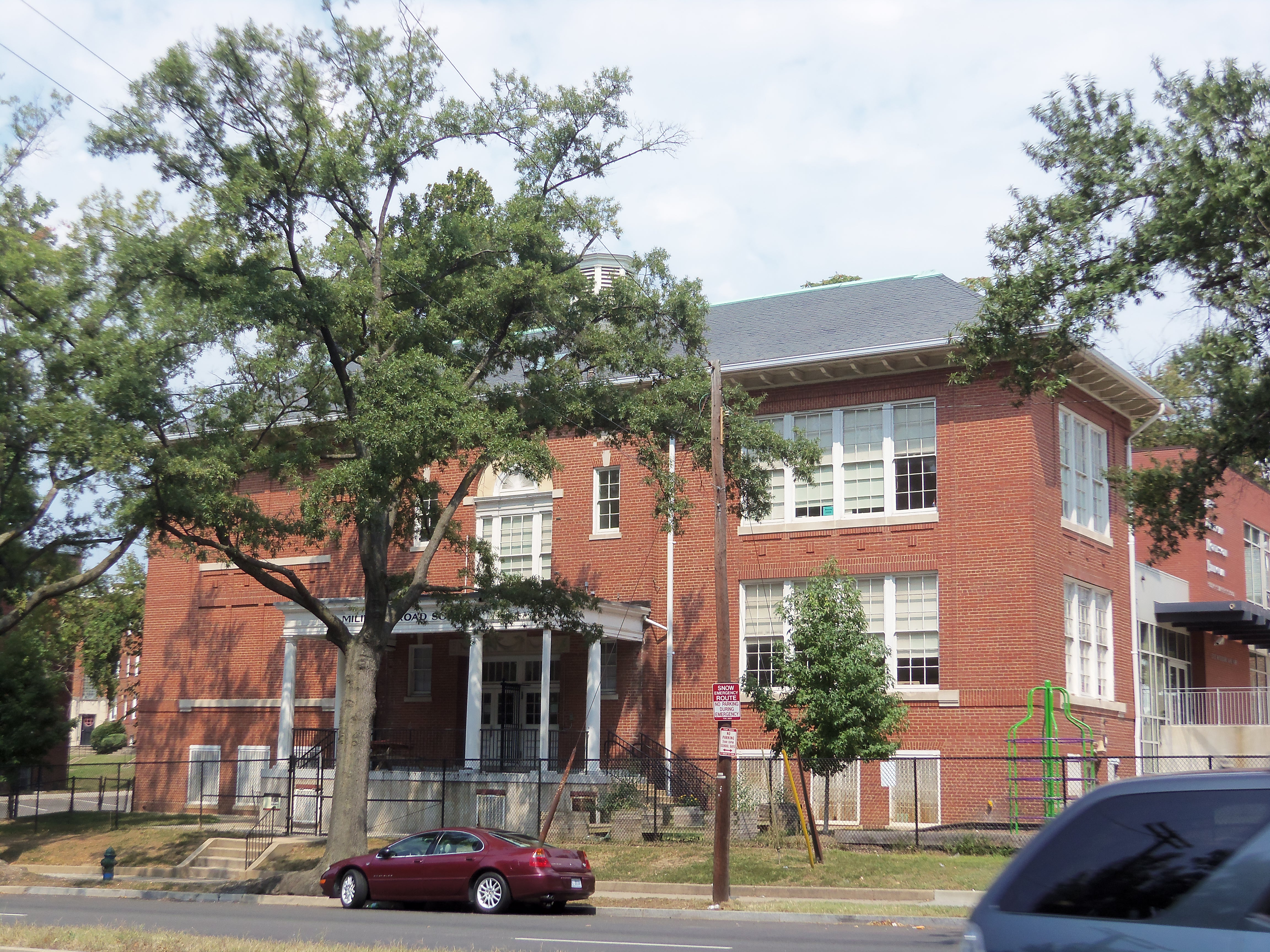
- Military Road School in 2013

- Location within District of Columbia
- Location: 1375 Missouri Ave., NW; Washington, D.C.
- Coordinates: 38°57′44″N 77°01′56″W
- Built: 1911–1912
- Architect: Snowden Ashford
- MPS: Public School Buildings of Washington, DC MPS
- NRHP reference No.: 03000674
- Added to NRHP: July 25, 2003

The Military Road School is an historic public school building in the Brightwood neighborhood in the Northwest Quadrant of Washington, D.C. It was listed on the National Register of Historic Places in 2003.

From 2003 to 2020, it was occupied by the Latin American Montessori Bilingual Public Charter School.

== History ==
The Military Road School was established in 1864 to educate free people of color. The site was formerly occupied by the barracks of Fort Stevens and was located on what was then Military Road, which connected Washington's Civil War forts. Many freedmen and freedwomen settled near forts for protection and employment. It was one of the first schools in Washington to open after Congress authorized the education of African Americans. The students who attended school came from the neighborhood, traveled from other parts of upper Northwest Washington, as well as from Montgomery County, Maryland. The school remained open until 1954 when the Brown v. Board of Education decision desegregated public schools in the United States.

== Architecture ==
The front part of the present school building was one of the first to be designed by the office of the Municipal Architect, which had been established in 1909, and to be reviewed by the Commission of Fine Arts, which had been established in 1910. The two and a half story building was designed by Snowden Ashford. A large contemporary addition was completed behind the building in 2009.

The building is faced with red brick and is accented by stucco panels and limestone trim. It is one room wide and has a central entrance porch. The large banks of multi-paned windows are located on the front and the sides of the building for maximum lighting. There are recessed brick panels on the back of the building. The gently flared hipped roof features wide scrolled eaves, and is topped by an octagonal shaped cupola.
