= Brightwood Park =

- Neighborhood of Washington, D.C.
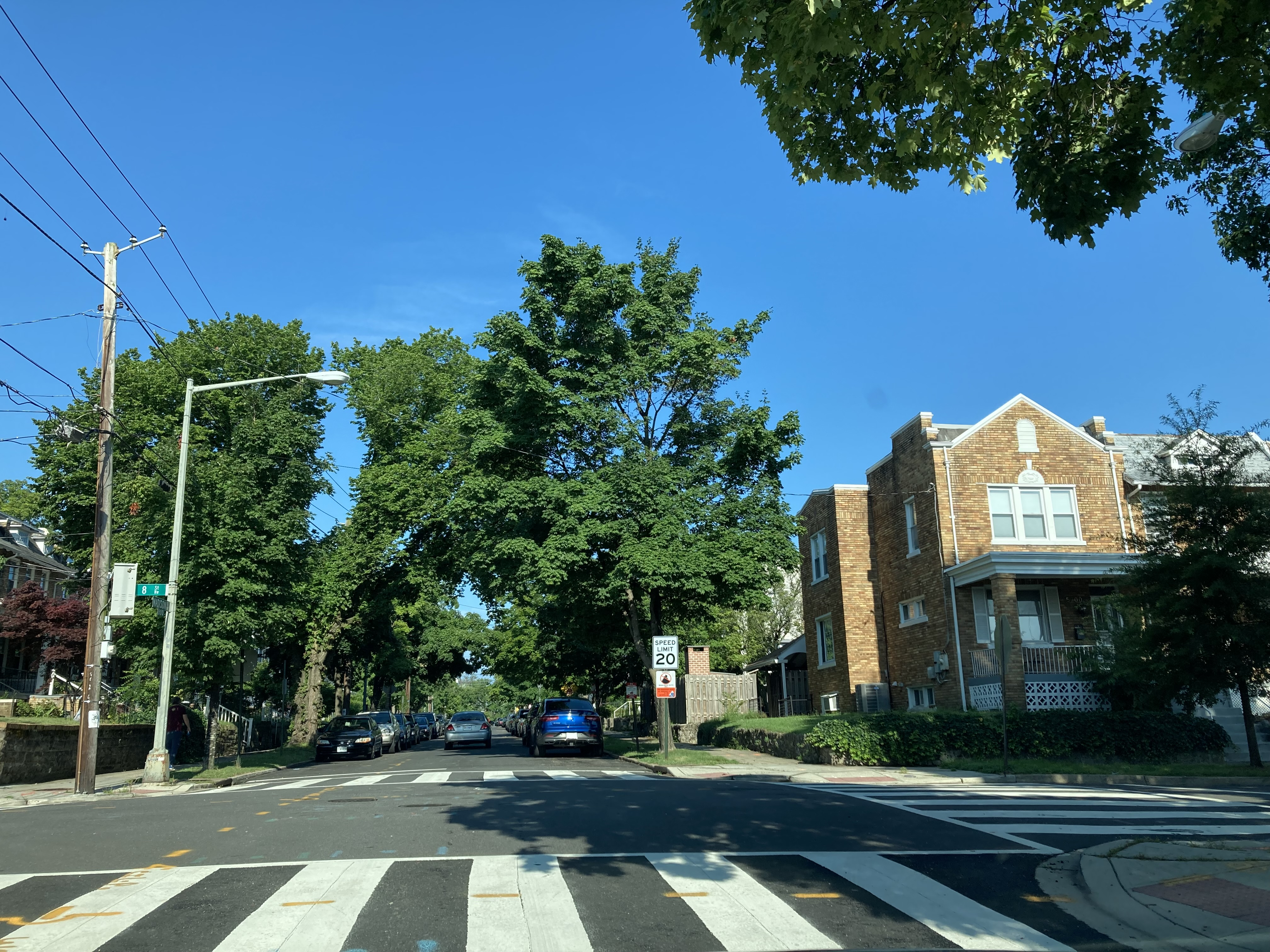
- Intersection of 8th St. and Madison St. NW, in Brightwood Park, July 2021.

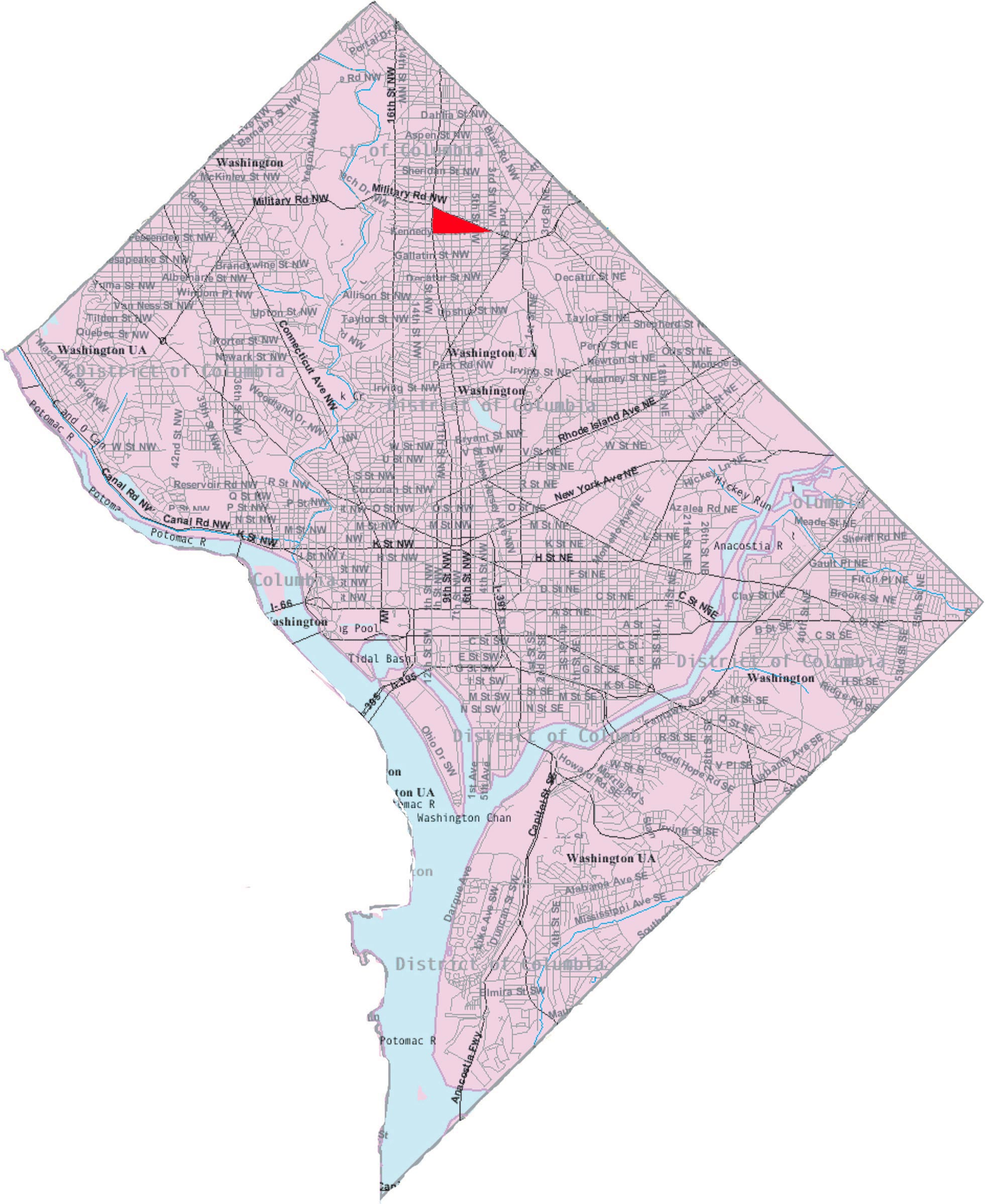
- Map of Washington, D.C., with Brightwood Park highlighted in red
- Coordinates: 38.9571°N 77.0249°W
- Country: United States
- District: Washington, D.C.
- Ward: Ward 4

Government
  - Councilmember: Janeese Lewis George
- Postal code: ZIP code

Brightwood Park is a small neighborhood in Northwest Washington, D.C. in the United States. The neighborhood is bounded by Georgia Avenue NW to the west, Missouri Avenue NW to the northeast and Kennedy Street NW to the south. More recently, areas that are technically part of the northern extremity of the Petworth neighborhood have been increasingly referred to as Brightwood Park. Often these informal boundaries extend south to Emerson Street NW, and east to New Hampshire Avenue NW. Another definition places Hamilton Street NW as Brightwood Park's southern boundary. Other definition places Brightwood Park's southern boundary as Ingraham Street NW or Gallatin Street NW. The most expansive definition states Brightwood Park's borders as Missouri Avenue to the north, North Capitol Street on the east, Emerson Street to the south and Georgia Avenue on the west. It is located in Ward 4.

Brightwood Park is largely characterized by rowhouses, detached and semi-detached houses, and small neighborhood businesses. Its main commercial strips are Georgia Ave NW and Kennedy Street NW. The neighborhood is often misidentified as being part of adjacent neighborhoods, such as the Brightwood neighborhood, the Petworth neighborhood to the south and the Manor Park neighborhood to the north.

In January 2013, resident Robert White helped co-found the Brightwood Park Citizens Association, and was elected its founding president. On June 14, 2016, White defeated Vincent Orange and David Garber to win the Democratic Party nomination for the at-large seat on the D.C. Council. His margin of victory was just 2 percent.

== Notable buildings ==
- Hampshire Garden Apartment Buildings, listed on the National Register of Historic Places in Washington, D. C.
