= Sixteenth Street Heights =

Neighborhood in Washington, D.C.

Coordinates: 38.9488°N 77.0327°W

Map of Washington, D.C., with Sixteenth Street Heights highlighted in maroon.

Sixteenth Street Heights is a large predominantly residential neighborhood of rowhouses, duplexes, and American Craftsman and American Foursquare detached houses in Northwest Washington, D.C.

== Geography ==
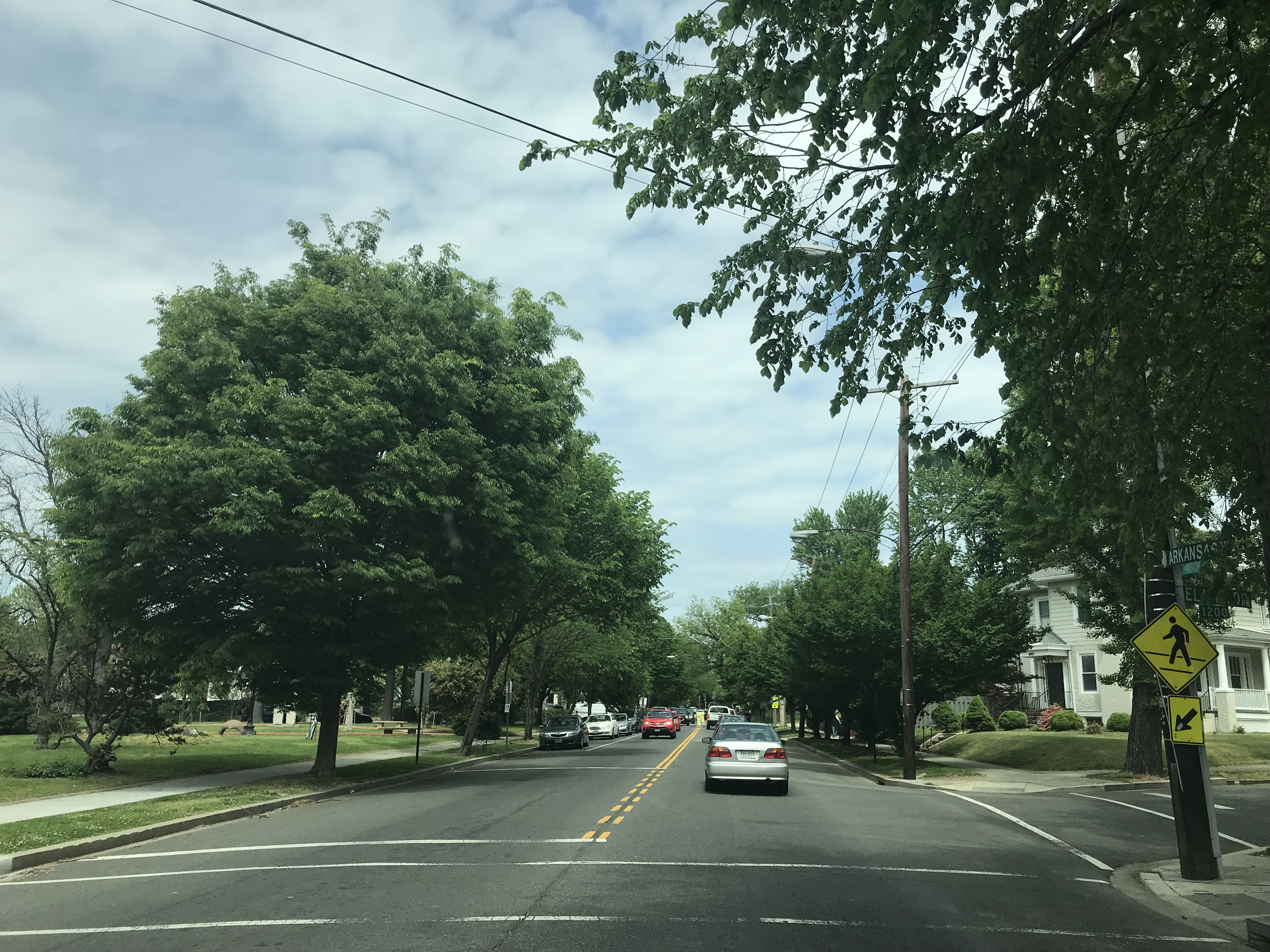
16th St. Heights, at the intersection of Arkansas Ave and 13th St NW, April 2019

Definitions of Sixteenth Street Heights' boundaries vary, although the neighborhood can be broadly outlined by 16th Street on the west, Georgia Avenue on the east, Missouri Avenue to the north, and Arkansas Avenue to the south. The 16th Street Heights Tax Assessment Neighborhood is defined as 16th Street on the west, Missouri Avenue on the north, Georgia Avenue on the east, and Upshur Street on the south. All of 16th Street Heights lies within ZIP code 20011.

Adjoining neighborhoods include:

- Brightwood (north of Missouri Avenue)
- Brightwood Park (northeast of Georgia Avenue and Kennedy Street)
- Columbia Heights (south of Spring Road)
- Crestwood (west of 16th Street)
- Park View (southeast of New Hampshire Avenue)
- Petworth (east of Georgia Avenue)

=== Transportation ===
- S1, S2, S4 and S9 Metrobus lines run north–south along 16th Street.
- 52, 54, and 59 Metrobus lines run north–south along 14th Street.
- 70 and 79 Metrobus lines run north–south along Georgia Avenue.
- E2, E3, and E4 Metrobus lines run along Military Road west of 14th Street, north–south along 14th Street, and along Kennedy Street west of 14th Street.

== Culture ==
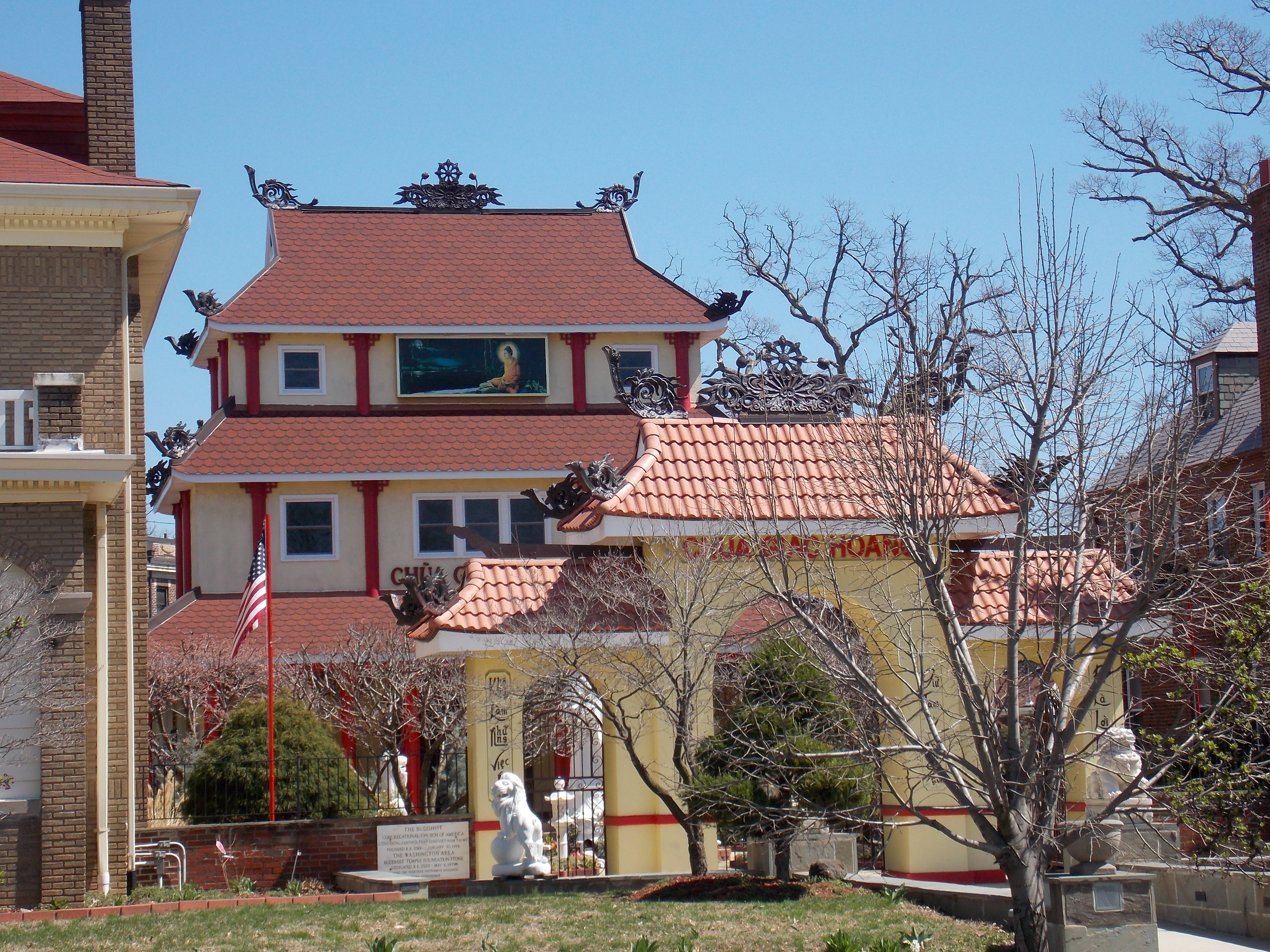
Giac Hoang Buddhist Temple on 16th Street NW.

Sixteenth Street Heights is one of the most demographically diverse neighborhoods in the city. The homes along 16th Street and its surrounding corridor are primarily owned by affluent residents, while the commercial corridors of 14th Street and Georgia Avenue cater to middle- and lower-middle-class Hispanic and African American customers.

=== Commercial areas ===
Unlike the neighboring areas of Brightwood, Columbia Heights, and Petworth, 16th Street Heights has few commercial districts as it cherishes its residential character. Aside from a handful of corner shops in other areas of the neighborhood, businesses are confined to Georgia Avenue, 14th Street between Buchanan Street and Decatur Street, and the area surrounding the intersection of 14th Street, Colorado Avenue, and Kennedy Street. The Columbia Heights business district also extends to Shepherd Street in the southern end of the neighborhood. Many residents drive elsewhere for most of their shopping.

The 14th and Colorado area was once home to Colorado Kitchen, and Twins Lounge, a notable jazz club. Both have closed.

=== Churches ===
More than 45 churches line 16th Street between Silver Spring, Maryland, and Lafayette Square. In 2008, the LDS Church bought a convent on 1.5 acres (6,100 m^{2}) at the corner of 16th Street and Emerson Street and demolished it. They sought to build a meetinghouse on the site with a 105-foot (32 m) steeple. Neighborhood outcry was fierce; many residents displayed lawn signs that read, "Too Big, Too Much, Too Many." Opponents of the church sought to extend southward the Sixteenth Street Heights overlay zone that residents had fought long and hard to create, which is divided into SSH-1 from Military Road to Colorado Avenue and SSH-2 from Colorado to Decatur. Both restrict non-residential uses and associated parking by requiring Board of Zoning Adjustment approval. After much discussion, approval was granted to build the church, which was completed in October 2012 and is now home to two Mormon congregations: the Washington, DC, 3rd Ward and the Mount Pleasant Spanish-speaking Branch. Other churches in the neighborhood include St. Paul A.M.E. Church.

=== Recreation ===
Sixteenth Street Heights is next to Rock Creek Park, a 1,754-acre (7.1 km^{2}) national park that bisects the District of Columbia. Park facilities near 16th Street Heights include lawns used for sun bathing, soccer, weekly football matches, a popular jogging track and picnic areas for local residents and the public; the Carter Barron Amphitheater and the William H.G. Fitzgerald Tennis Center, which hosts the annual Mubadala Citi Open tennis tournament, as well as tennis courts for the public, except when unavailable due to the professional tennis tournament. The grass fields are effectively out of service for a month or more due to field parking during the tournament, until rehabilitated by tournament management. The area is bordered to the west by forest.

The Hamilton Recreation Center at 1340 Hamilton Street has a 60-foot (18 m) by 40-foot (12 m) athletic field, a basketball court, a playground, and a small multi-purpose room. The Upshur Recreation Center at 4300 Arkansas Avenue has a baseball/softball field, two basketball courts, a computer lab, a kitchen, a medium-sized multi-purpose room, a playground, and a swimming pool. The Twin Oaks Community Garden, at 1425 Taylor Street, has 40 plots and hosts a Junior Master Gardener Program.

== History ==
A part of Washington County until passage of the District of Columbia Organic Act of 1871, Sixteenth Street Heights was developed as a series of subdivisions.

Streetcar lines on 14th Street and Georgia Avenue accelerated the growth of the area. The 14th Street line, which originally stopped at Park Road, was extended in late 1906 to spur growth in the area. Two historic streetcar facilities are currently used by Metrobus: the Capital Traction Company car barn at 4615 14th Street, NW, is now the Northern Division garage, and the 14th and Colorado turnaround is the terminal for some 52, 53, and 54 buses.

The initial generation of residents was largely white and later had an influx of Jewish residents. In the late 1960s, the neighborhood became mostly African-American.

In the 21st century, Sixteenth Street Heights has seen a tremendous transformation. Houses on every street are being renovated inside and out. Many young families have moved in because homes in Sixteenth Street Heights tend to be more affordable than similar ones in many other neighborhoods in DC and close-in suburbs. They are also attracted by the diverse housing stock and the proximity to Carter Barron Amphitheater and Rock Creek Park.

=== Saul's Addition ===
Much of 16th Street Heights was once part of Maple Grove Farm, an 80-acre (320,000 m^{2}) nursery acquired in May 1854 by John Hennessy Saul, who led improvements of the Mall, Capitol, and White House grounds. By 1892, Saul's son, Bernard Francis Saul, founded the B.F. Saul Company to sell land in individual lots and take notes as mortgages to speed the sale.

The subdivision known as Saul's Addition was generally bounded by Buchanan Street, Piney Branch Road, Gallatin Street, and Georgia Avenue. Two public buildings were planned: the John Dickson Home for Aged Men (now occupied by the LAMB Public Charter School) and West Elementary School (which has been replaced by a modern building on the same site).

Numerous restrictions were put in the deeds of Saul's Addition lots. Some, including the requirement that all homes be fully detached and the prohibition of commercial and multifamily buildings, remain largely in effect through zoning laws. Others have been dropped or ruled illegal, such as the restriction on the sale of lots to people of color, which was struck down in 1948 by the Supreme Court in Shelley v. Kraemer.

=== Fourteenth Street Terrace ===
The area to the north of Saul's Addition was subdivided as Fourteenth Street Terrace. While similar to Saul's Addition, the deeds did not prohibit semi-detached houses, and many duplexes can be seen on the 1300 blocks of Gallatin, Hamilton, and Ingraham Streets.

== Politics ==
Sixteenth Street Heights is represented as part of Ward 4 on the Council of the District of Columbia. Muriel Bowser served as councilperson before she became the city's mayor in 2015. Janeese Lewis George is the current Ward 4 councilperson. Most of Sixteenth Street Heights lies within Advisory Neighborhood Commission 4E.

Three neighborhood organizations serve 16th Street Heights: the 16th Street Heights Civic Associations with boundaries of Military Road to the North, Rock Creek Park to the West, Colorado Ave to the South and parts of Colorado and 13th St to the East; the 16th Street Neighborhood Association; and the Carter Barron East Neighborhood Association, whose boundaries are Decatur Street to the south, Longfellow Street to the north and 13th Street to the east. The community is also served by the Friends Of The 16th Street Heights Parks.

Former Chancellor of District of Columbia Public Schools Michelle Rhee used to live in the neighborhood.
