= District of Columbia Public Charter School Board =

School authority of the U.S. capital

DC Public Charter School Board
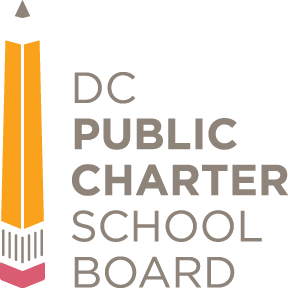

Location
- 101 M Street St SE, Suite 400 Washington, D.C. 20003 Washington, D.C. United States

District information
- Type: Public
- Grades: PK3-adult
- Established: 1996
- School board: Dr. Michelle J. Walker-Davis, Ed.D. (executive director)
- Schools: 134 (2024–2025 academic year)

Students and staff
- Students: 47,301

Other information
- Website: https://dcpcsb.org/

The District of Columbia Public Charter School Board (DC PCSB) is the regulatory authority and sole authorizer of all public charter schools in the District of Columbia, United States. It provides oversight to 68 independently-run nonprofits (also referred to as local education agencies or LEAs) and 134 public charter schools which educate more than 47,000 students living in every ward of the district (48% of all DC public school students). The board is tasked with approving, monitoring, and evaluating schools, creating policies and conditions to empower educators to do their best work, and actively engaging families, schools, and communities to inform the Board's decision-making.

== History ==
DC PCSB was created in 1996 by the District of Columbia School Reform Act of 1995 as a second, independent authorizer of public charter schools in the District of Columbia. In 2006, the District of Columbia State Board of Education voted to relinquish its authorizing responsibilities for public charter schools and in 2007, the Council of the District of Columbia passed legislation granting the Mayor of the District of Columbia direct authority over the traditional public school system. With that vote, the board became the sole authority, led by a seven-member volunteer board, for public charter schools within the District of Columbia.

== Mission ==
DC public charter schools are environments where all students, especially those in historically marginalized groups, thrive. As DC's sole charter authorizer, the DC Public Charter School Board:

- Approves, monitors, and evaluates schools, with an emphasis on equity and academic excellence
- Creates policies and conditions to empower educators to do their best work in service of students
- Actively engages families, schools, and communities to inform decision-making

== Leadership ==
The DC Public Charter School Board is led by Dr. Michelle J. Walker-Davis, who joined as executive director in August 2020.

== Governance ==
DC PCSB is led by a seven-member volunteer Board responsible for approving new schools, conducting oversight of schools in operation, and revoking a school's charter if it fails to meet its performance goals. The board members are appointed by the Mayor and confirmed by the DC Council, in contrast to the elected District of Columbia State Board of Education that governs the DC Public Schools system.

== DC Public Charter School Board Members ==
- Shantelle Wright (chair) - Ward 8
- Jim Sandman (Vice Chair) - Ward 6
- Shukurat Adamoh-Faniyan (Secretary) - Ward 8
- Carisa Stanley Beatty (Treasurer) - Ward 5
- Lea Crusey - Ward 6
- Dwight Davis - Ward 5
- Nick Rodriguez - Ward 6

== 2025-2028 Strategic Roadmap ==
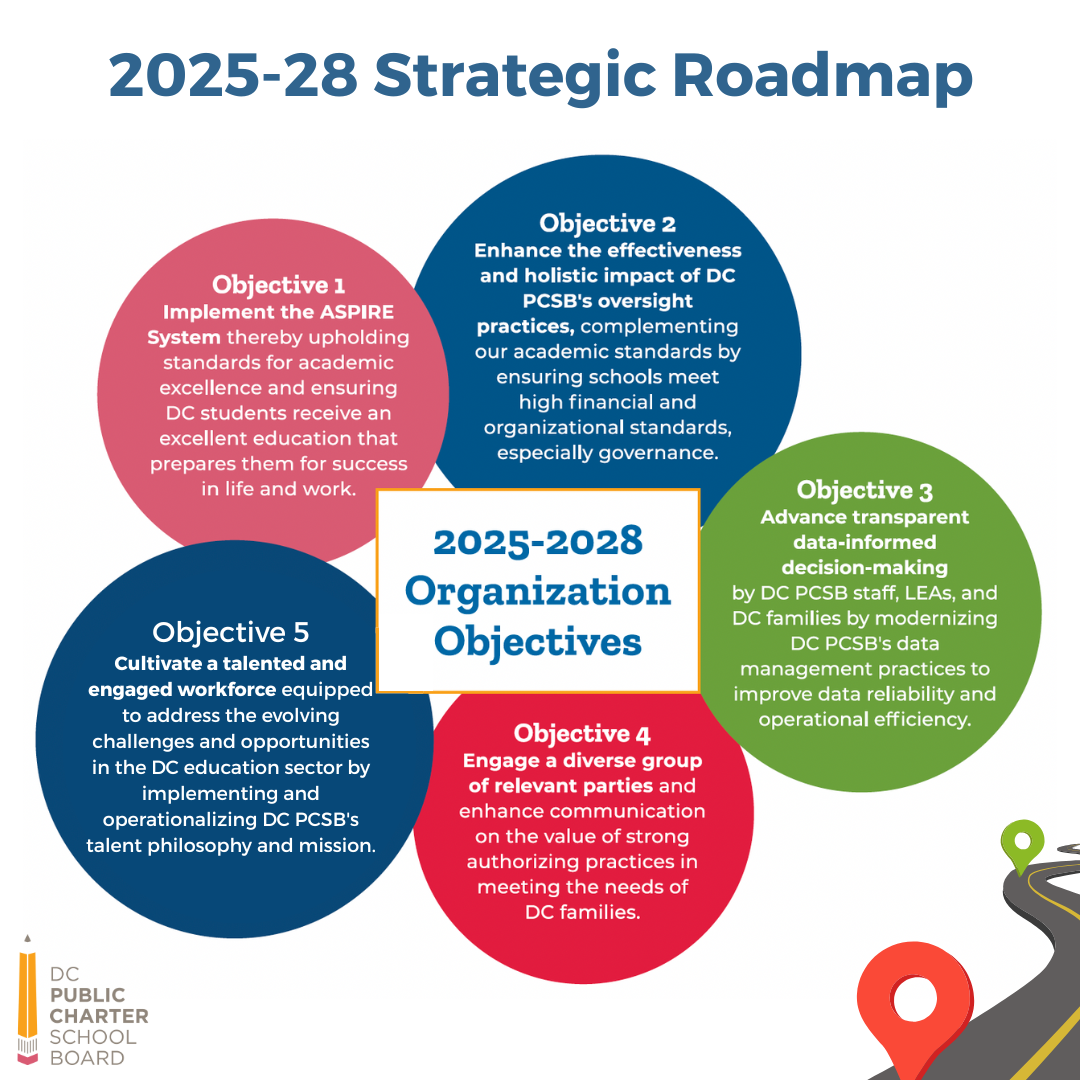
an image of the 5 objectives of the DC PCSB 2025-2028 Strategic Roadmap

DC PCSB developed a Strategic Roadmap which guides the organization's actions through 2028, and emphasizes a commitment to focusing on equity and the District students public charter schools serve. The Strategic Roadmap guides the organization's work in three areas:

Excellent Schools - ensuring internal decision-making responds to citywide needs and results in improved outcomes for all DC students, especially those in historically marginalized groups.

Enduring Partnerships - strengthening relationships and partnerships with families, school communities, and residents.

Effective Organization - improving internal structure, processes, and culture to allow DC PCSB to create the conditions for student success in DC.

The five objectives of our 2025-2028 Strategic Roadmap are:

1. Implement the ASPIRE System thereby upholding standards for academic excellence and ensuring DC students receive an excellent education that prepares them for success in life and work.
2. Enhance the effectiveness and holistic impact of DC PCSB's oversight practices, complementing our academic standards by ensuring schools meet high financial and organizational standards, especially governance.
3. Advance transparent data-informed decision-making by DC PCSB staff, LEAs, and DC families by modernizing DC PCSB's data management practices to improve data reliability and operational efficiency.
4. Engage a well-rounded group of relevant parties and enhance communication on the value of strong authorizing practices in meeting the needs of DC families.
5. Cultivate a talented and engaged workforce equipped to address the evolving challenges and opportunities in the DC education sector by implementing and operationalizing DC PCSB's talent philosophy and mission.

== ASPIRE (Annual School Performance Index Report & Evaluation) Framework ==
ASPIRE is DC PCSB's academic accountability system. It enables us as DC's only charter authorizer to evaluate and review schools’ performance in service of their mission and students.

ASPIRE stands for Annual School Performance Index Report & Evaluation. Simply put, ASPIRE means achieving excellent schools for all students, particularly those from communities which have been historically marginalized.

ASPIRE has five main frameworks, which are separated based on the grade bands that a school serves: PK-Only, PK-8, High School, Adult, and Alternative.

In the first year of implementation, most schools will be evaluated based on their success in four main categories: School Progress, School Achievement, School Environment, and a new school-selected category, called School-Specific Performance. DC PCSB has determined various metrics for each category, including state assessments and CLASS data. PK-Only schools will be evaluated based on just three categories: School Progress and Achievement, School Environment, and School-Specific Performance.

Schools' evaluation based on these frameworks will determine their level. ASPIRE has five levels (Level 1, Exemplary; Level 2, Strong Performance; Level 3, Satisfactory Performance; Level 4, Weak Performance; Level 5, Unsatisfactory Performance), a major departure from our former three-tier system, in the Performance Management Framework (PMF).

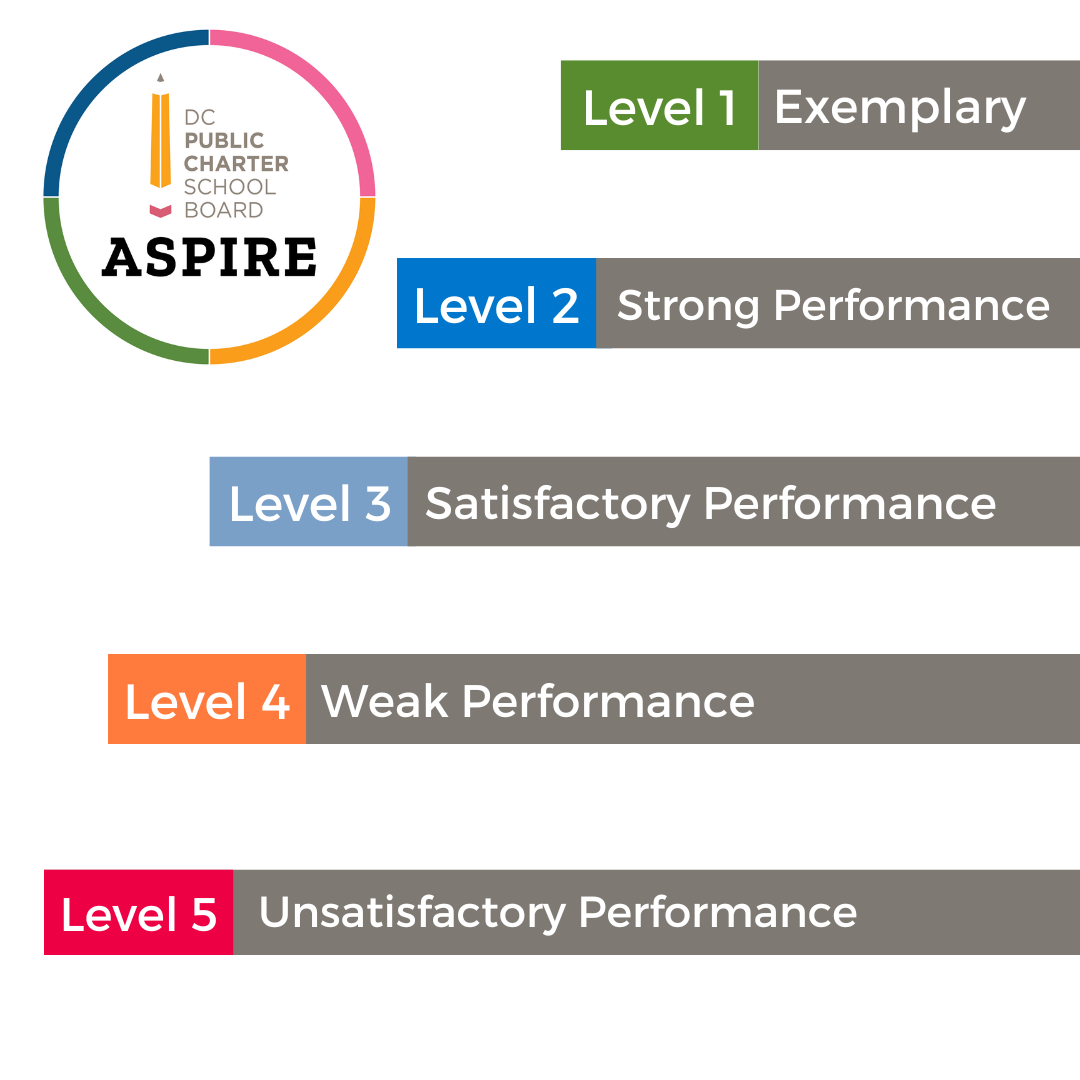
ASPIRE Levels

DC PCSB will use these levels to make school oversight decisions. School leaders will be able to use their ASPIRE evaluation to understand their impact on students' success, and improve it. Families and communities will use this evaluation to understand how their local school serves their students.

For more information about the ASPIRE framework, there is an overview document available as well as a video playlist.

== Enrollment ==
DC public charter schools educate nearly half of DC's public school students, in grades PK through 12 and adults.

The number of students enrolled in public schools in Washington, DC during the 2023–24 school year increased slightly compared to 2020-21 enrollment, with 98,639 students enrolled in district public and public charter schools according to preliminary data released by the Office of the State Superintendent of Education (OSSE).

As of the 2023–24 school year, DC public charter schools enrolled a total of 45,307 students. The bulk of students were enrolled in grades PK 3-5, totaling 23,891 students. A total of 8,942 middle school students enrolled in grades 6–8, while 7,328 students enrolled in grades 9–12. DC public charter schools continue to educate the largest population of adult learners with 7,140 students enrolled in adult education programs in school year 2023–24.

The ethnic breakdown of students enrolled in school year 2023-24 was 68.4% Black, 18.9% Hispanic (of any race), 7.6% non-Hispanic White, and 4.9% of other races.

== Schools ==
This is a complete list of school campuses as of SY2024-25.
School Name	Ward	Grades Served	
School Name	Ward	Lowest	Highest
Academy of Hope Adult PCS	5	n/a	adult
Achievement Preparatory Academy PCS - Wahler Place Elementary School	8	PK3	6
AppleTree Early Learning Center PCS - Columbia Heights	1	PK3	K
AppleTree Early Learning Center PCS - Douglas Knoll	8	PK3	K
AppleTree Early Learning Center PCS - Lincoln Park	6	PK3	K
AppleTree Early Learning Center PCS - Oklahoma Avenue	7	PK3	K
AppleTree Early Learning Center PCS - Parklands at THEARC	8	PK3	K
AppleTree Early Learning Center PCS - Southwest	6	PK3	K
AppleTree Early Learning Center PCS - Spring Valley	3	PK3	K
AppleTree Early Learning Center PCS - Waterfront Station	6	PK3	K
BASIS DC PCS	2	5	12
Breakthrough Montessori PCS	4	PK3	6
Bridges PCS	5	PK3	5
Briya PCS	5	PK3, PK4	adult
Capital City PCS - High School	4	9	12
Capital City PCS - Lower School	4	PK3	4
Capital City PCS - Middle School	4	5	8
Capital Village PCS	5	6	8
Carlos Rosario International PCS	1	n/a	adult
Cedar Tree Academy PCS	8	PK3	2
Center City PCS - Brightwood	4	PK3	8
Center City PCS - Capitol Hill	6	PK3	8
Center City PCS - Congress Heights	8	PK3	8
Center City PCS - NoMa	5	PK3	8
Center City PCS - Petworth	4	PK3	8
Center City PCS - Shaw	6	PK4	8
Cesar Chavez Public Charter Schools for Public Policy	7	6	12
Community College Preparatory Academy PCS	8	n/a	adult
Creative Minds International PCS	5	PK3	8
DC Bilingual PCS	5	PK3	5
DC Prep PCS - Anacostia Elementary School	8	PK3	3
DC Prep PCS - Anacostia Middle School	8	4	8
DC Prep PCS - Benning Elementary School	7	PK3	3
DC Prep PCS - Benning Middle School	7	4	8
DC Prep PCS - Edgewood Elementary School	5	PK3	3
DC Prep PCS - Edgewood Middle School	5	4	8
DC Scholars PCS	7	PK3	8
DC Wildflower PCS	7	PK3	1
Digital Pioneers Academy PCS - Capitol Hill	6	9	12
Digital Pioneers Academy PCS - Johenning	6	6	8
District of Columbia International School	4	6	12
E.L. Haynes PCS - Elementary School	1	PK3	5
E.L. Haynes PCS - High School	4	9	12
E.L. Haynes PCS - Middle School	4	6	8
Early Childhood Academy PCS	8	PK3	3
Elsie Whitlow Stokes Community Freedom PCS - Brookland	5	PK3	5
Elsie Whitlow Stokes Community Freedom PCS - East End	7	PK3	5
Friendship PCS - Armstrong Elementary	5	PK3	3
Friendship PCS - Armstrong Middle	5	4	8
Friendship PCS - Blow Pierce Elementary	7	PK3	3
Friendship PCS - Blow Pierce Middle	7	4	8
Friendship PCS - Chamberlain Elementary	6	PK3	3
Friendship PCS - Chamberlain Middle	6	4	8
Friendship PCS - Collegiate Academy	7	9	12
Friendship PCS - Ideal Elementary	4	PK3	3
Friendship PCS - Ideal Middle	4	4	8
Friendship PCS - Online Academy	4	K	8
Friendship PCS - Southeast Elementary	8	PK3	3
Friendship PCS - Southeast Middle	8	4	8
Friendship PCS - Technology Preparatory High School	8	9	12
Friendship PCS - Woodridge International Elementary	5	PK3	3
Friendship PCS - Woodridge International Middle	5	4	8
Girls Global Academy PCS	2	9	12
Global Citizens PCS	2	PK3	2
Goodwill Excel Center PCS	2	9	12
Harmony DC PCS - School of Excellence	5	PK3	5
Hope Community PCS - Tolson	5	PK3	8
Howard University Middle School of Mathematics and Science PCS	1	6	8
I Dream PCS	7	PK3	5
IDEA PCS	7	9	12
Ingenuity Prep PCS	8	PK3	8
Inspired Teaching Demonstration PCS	5	PK3	8
Kingsman Academy PCS	6	6	12
KIPP DC - AIM Academy PCS	8	5	8
KIPP DC - Arts and Technology Academy PCS	7	PK3	K
KIPP DC - College Preparatory PCS	5	9	12
KIPP DC - Connect Academy PCS	5	PK3	K
KIPP DC - Discover Academy PCS	8	PK3	K
KIPP DC - Grow Academy PCS	6	PK3	K
KIPP DC - Heights Academy PCS	8	1	4
KIPP DC - Honor Academy PCS	8	5	8
KIPP DC - Inspire Academy PCS	8	1	4
KIPP DC - KEY Academy PCS	7	5	8
KIPP DC - Lead Academy PCS	6	1	4
KIPP DC - LEAP Academy PCS	7	PK3	PK4
KIPP DC - Northeast Academy PCS	5	5	8
KIPP DC - Pride Academy PCS	8	PK3	K
KIPP DC - Promise Academy PCS	7	K	4
KIPP DC - Quest Academy PCS	7	1	4
KIPP DC - Spring Academy PCS	5	1	4
KIPP DC - Valor Academy PCS	7	5	8
KIPP DC - WILL Academy PCS	6	5	8
KIPP DC PCS - Legacy College Preparatory PCS	8	9	12
Latin American Montessori Bilingual PCS	4	PK3	5
LAYC Career Academy PCS	1	n/a	adult
LEARN DC PCS	8	PK3	4
Lee Montessori PCS - Brookland	5	PK3	6
Lee Montessori PCS - East End	8	PK3	4
Mary McLeod Bethune Day Academy PCS	5	PK3	8
Maya Angelou PCS - High School	7	9	12
Maya Angelou PCS - Young Adult Learning Center	7	n/a	adult
Meridian PCS	1	PK3	8
Monument Academy PCS	7	5	8
Mundo Verde Bilingual PCS - Calle Ocho	5	PK3	5
Mundo Verde Bilingual PCS - J.F. Cook	5	PK3	5
Paul PCS - International High School	4	9	12
Paul PCS - Middle School	4	5	8
Perry Street Preparatory PCS	5	PK3	8
Richard Wright PCS for Journalism and Media Arts	6	9	12
Rocketship PCS - Infinity Community Prep	5	PK3	5
Rocketship PCS - Legacy Prep	7	PK3	5
Rocketship PCS - Rise Academy	8	PK3	5
Roots PCS	4	PK3	5
Sela PCS	4	PK3	5
Shining Stars Montessori Academy PCS	5	PK3	6
Social Justice PCS	5	5	8
St. Coletta Special Education PCS	7	n/a	alternative
Statesmen College Preparatory Academy for Boys PCS	8	4	8
The Children's Guild DC PCS	5	K	8
The Family Place PCS	1	n/a	adult
The Next Step/El Proximo Paso PCS	1	n/a	adult
The SEED PCS of Washington DC	7	9	12
The Sojourner Truth School PCS	5	6	12
Thurgood Marshall Academy PCS	8	9	12
Two Rivers PCS - 4th Street	6	PK3	5
Two Rivers PCS - Young Elementary School	5	PK3	5
Two Rivers PCS - Young Middle School	5	6	8
Washington Global PCS	6	6	8
Washington Latin PCS - Middle School	4	5	8
Washington Latin PCS - The Anna Julia Cooper Campus Middle School	5	5	8
Washington Latin PCS - Upper School	4	9	12
Washington Leadership Academy PCS	5	9	12
Washington Yu Ying PCS	5	PK3	5
YouthBuild DC PCS	1	n/a	adult
