= Hampshire Garden Apartment Buildings =

- U.S. National Register of Historic Places
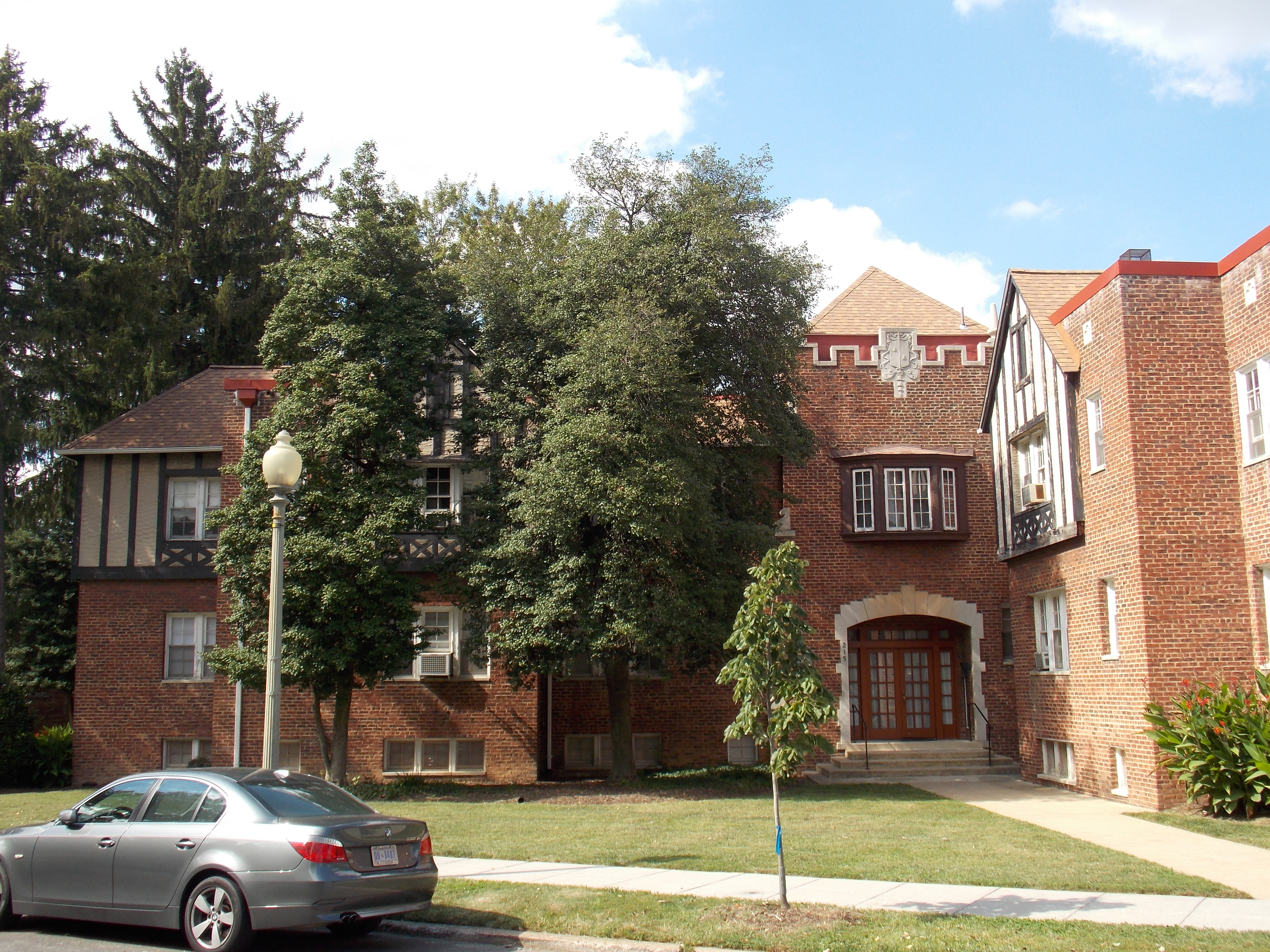

- Location within the District of Columbia Location within the United States
- Location: 4912 New Hampshire Ave., 208, 222, 236 and 250 Farragut St., 4915 3rd St. and 215, 225 and 235 Emerson St., NW. Washington, D.C.
- Coordinates: 38°57′2″N 77°0′53″W
- Built: 1929
- Architect: James E. Cooper (exteriors); George T. Santmyers (interiors)
- Architectural style: Tudor revival
- MPS: Apartment Buildings in Washington, DC, MPS
- NRHP reference No.: 94001031
- Added to NRHP: September 9, 1994

Hampshire Garden Apartment Buildings are historic structures located in the Petworth neighborhood in the Northwest quadrant of Washington, D.C. They were listed on the National Register of Historic Places in 1994. It is also a D.C. Historic Landmark.

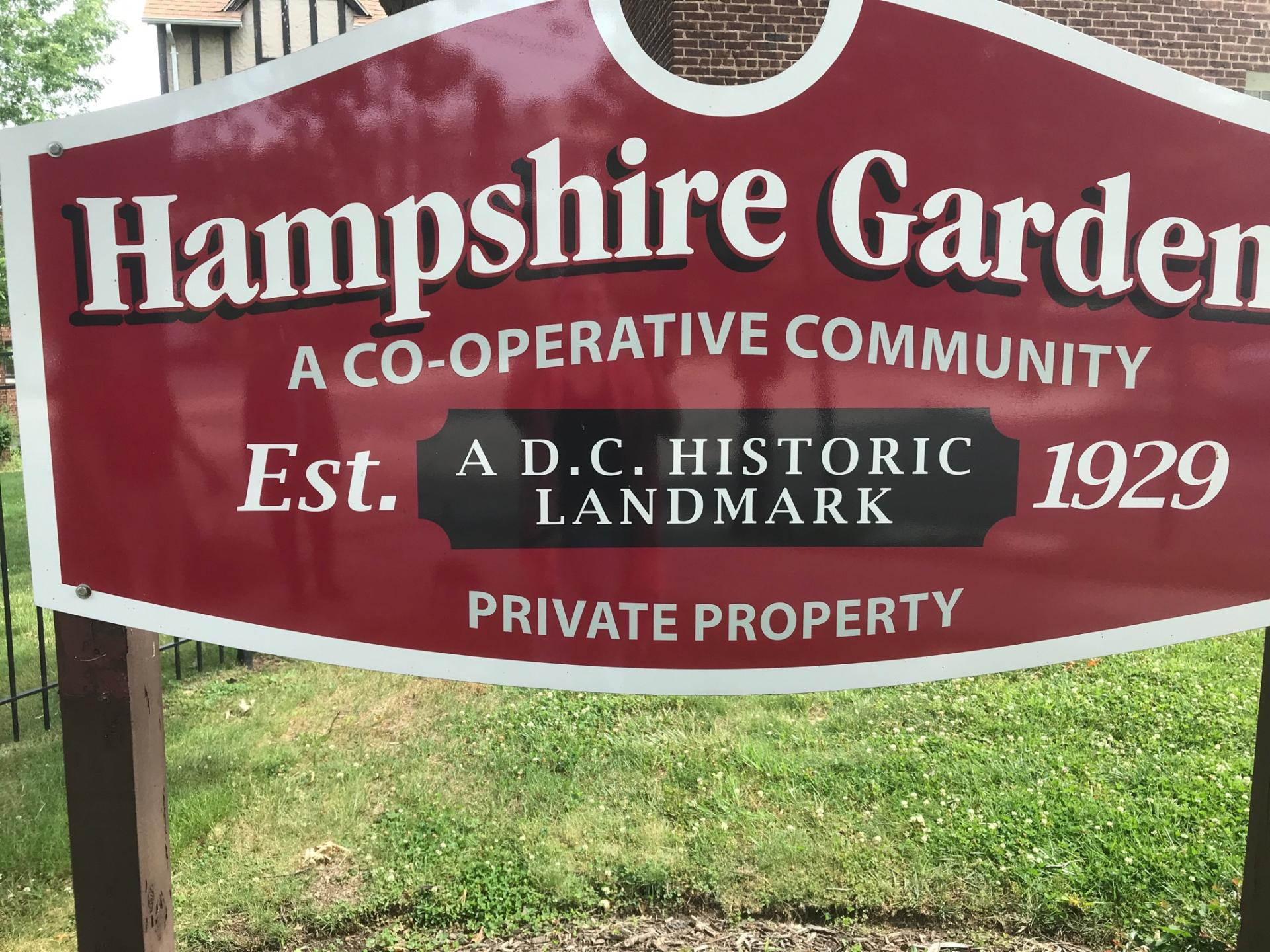
The sign in front of Hampshire Gardens in NW Washington, DC.

== History ==
The buildings of the Hampshire Garden Apartments compose the first fully developed garden apartment complex in the city, although only part of it was built.

The initial plan was for the complex to have 2,500 units, but the Great Depression brought construction to an end in 1929. The complex was built as middle-class housing and was an early example of cooperative ownership.

The nine buildings occupy an entire block and surround an oval-shaped common lawn. They are all two stories tall and follow a cross-shaped plan. Decorative elements in the Tudor revival style include half timbering, crenellated towers and entrances trimmed in carved stone. The exteriors of the buildings were designed by James E. Cooper and George T. Santmyers designed the interiors. Parks and Baxter served as the landscape architects.
