= District of Columbia School Reform Act of 1995 =

- Other short titles: Omnibus Consolidated Rescissions and Appropriations Act of 1996
- Enacted by: the 104th United States Congress

Citations
- Public law: Pub. L. 104–134 (text) (PDF)
- Statutes at Large: 110 Stat. 1321-107

Legislative history
- Signed into law by President Bill Clinton on 26 April 1996

The District of Columbia School Reform Act of 1995 was passed by the United States Congress. Since Washington, D.C. is a semi-autonomous non-state, Congress has jurisdiction over the city and passed the Omnibus Consolidated Rescissions and Appropriations Act of 1996. Title I amended the D.C. School Reform Act in 1995, making charter schools part of the public-education system in Washington. Unlike the states, the District of Columbia had relatively little opposition to charter schools from politicians and the public; what opposition existed (from the Washington Teachers' Union) was not firmly entrenched due to controversy within the union. A strong advocate in getting the act passed was the advocacy group Friends of Choice in Urban Schools (FOCUS), which continues to lobby for charter schools in the district. The act created the District of Columbia Public Charter School Board (PCSB) as the city's second, independent authorizer of public charter schools in the city (the first is the District of Columbia Board of Education). Board members are nominated by the mayor of Washington, D.C., and approved by the DC Council. In 2006, the D.C. Board of Education voted to relinquish its charter-authorizing authority.

According to the D.C. Public Charter School Board's website,

The PCSB regularly evaluates D.C. public charter schools for academic results, compliance with applicable local and federal laws and fiscal management, and holds them accountable for results. The PCSB can close charter schools that fail to meet the goals established in the charter agreement between the PCSB and the school.

Congress mandated that the District of Columbia adopt charter schools to pressure the city's public schools to improve and to give parents more options for public education.

== D.C. Public Charter School Board membership ==
As of May 2019, members of the PCSB are Rick Cruz (chair), Saba Bireda (vice-chair), Steve Bumbaugh (Treasurer), Ricarda Ganjam (Secretary), Naomi Shelton, and Lea Crusey. Website: https://www.dcpcsb.org/our-people

== Conflict between DCPS and PCSB ==
During the early 2000s there was a conflict between the D.C. Public Schools (DCPS) and the Public Charter School Board over whether or not to convert a number of empty DCPS buildings into charter schools. DCPS was reluctant to surrender buildings it claimed could be used in the future. Meanwhile, DCPS faced financial pressure to use the surplus buildings for commercial purposes. Due to the poor reputation of DCPS and the influence of advocates for charter schools such as FOCUS, many buildings were converted into charter schools. Public charter schools have become increasingly popular in the District of Columbia, with 27, 953 students enrolled in the city's charter schools for the academic year 2010–2011 compared with 3,514 students for the academic year 1998–1999.

== Charter school performance ==
Students in Washington's charter schools outperform their public school counterparts, as shown by standardized tests and the District's tests in reading and mathematics. The National Assessment of Educational Progress (NAEP) found that in 2003, D.C. charter schools had lower scores in reading and mathematics than public schools; however, charter-school students outperformed public-school students in both subjects in 2005 and 2007. Some attribute charter schools' relative success in the district to their ability to "tap into private donors, bankers and developers [which] has made it possible to fund impressive facilities, expand programs, and reduce class sizes".

Charter schools have been particularly successful in educating children from low-income families, who comprise two-thirds of the District's public-school student population. This success has been attributed to charter schools' ability to experiment with a variety of educational approaches and their reliance on strategies known to help poor children academically: longer school days, summer and Saturday classes, parental involvement and a "cohesive, disciplined culture among staff members". District of Columbia records show that charter schools have better attendance and higher graduation rates than public schools, and teachers at charter schools are more likely to be considered "highly qualified" than teachers at public schools.

Charter schools report annually to their chartering boards on their academic progress and finances. Charters are recognized for 15 years before renewal, although charters may be revoked at any point if there is financial mismanagement. Failure to achieve Adequate Yearly Progress (AYP) for five years may also result in revocation of the charter.

== Charter school funding ==
Charter schools are publicly funded (receiving a sum per pupil) and are open to any resident of the District of Columbia. The estimated budget for 2011 in D.C. was $9.46 billion. About 20 percent ($1.99 billion) was earmarked for public education. The education budget was divided into several sectors, including public schools, charter schools and special-education transportation. Proponents of charter schools contend that the per-pupil funding system creates competition for DCPS schools; if public schools do not perform well and enrollment decreases, they will lose money. As of 2008, a charter school in the District received $11,879 in tax dollars for each elementary student enrolled: $8,770 to match per-pupil academic spending in the regular public schools, and a $3,109 facility allotment to help pay for buildings. Charter schools receive more in per-pupil allotments for older students. With relative financial autonomy, charter schools with over 300 students may find that their funding exceeds their costs; many successful charters have budget surpluses. There is a correlation between top-performing charter schools and extra funding; schools with the largest budget surpluses have ranked at the top in test scores. Charter schools also receive funding from bank loans and from a congressionally created panel, the D.C. Public Charter School Credit Enhancement and Direct Loan Funds Committee, which also provides private loans to developers who build charter schools.

Charter-school teachers are not unionized; pay and benefits are determined by the schools.

== Charter-school admissions ==
Charter schools are required to use a lottery system if they receive more applicants than they have space for, and charters are free to make their own rules for expelling students. One such lottery is depicted in the film Waiting for "Superman" which depicts the lottery system at the SEED school in Washington (one of the city's highest-performing charter schools, and its only charter boarding school). Charter schools do not have to follow DCPS rules and guidelines; they are considered independent, although they must follow the guidelines and directives set forth by the PCSB (which are often the product of an agreement—or charter—between a charter school and the PCSB).

== Impact ==
The (relative) academic success of charter schools has changed public education in the city, which has been regarded as having one of the most troubled school districts in the U.S. As of 2008, enrollment in "traditional" public schools decreased 42 percent since 1996; the growth in charter-school enrollment accounts for nearly the entire decline. The District of Columbia is now one of the largest charter-school districts in the country.

== Controversy ==
Not all charter schools in the city are (or have been) effective. The PCSB closes charter schools every year, while other failing charters are absorbed by higher-performing charter schools. During its fifteen-year history, the Public Charter School Board has been criticized for conflicts of interest and a lack of accountability on the part of board members; some officials who oversee charters have been involved in making private financial loans to the schools.

Opponents of charter schools argue that the PCSB should close more low-performing schools, or provide more support to struggling schools. In 2005, out of the thirty-four charter schools in DC only four made Annual Yearly Progress (AYP) in reading and mathematics as mandated by the No Child Left Behind Act. According to data published by the PCSB, only five out of eighteen charter high schools in D.C. made AYP in reading and math.

Another criticism is that charter schools encourage re-segregation in public schools. In an effort to give all students an opportunity for a good education, many charter schools are located in inner-city areas (and, therefore, serve mostly minority students). Even in racially diverse communities, charter schools do not reflect the demographic diversity of the community. Opponents of charter schools contend that they are returning education to the era of "separate, but equal". Some opponents of charter schools argue that the de facto segregation propagated by Washington's charter schools will result in fewer opportunities for low-income and minority students to interact with people from diverse backgrounds, hindering their preparedness for higher education and the job market.
