= National Register of Historic Places listings in the upper NW Quadrant of Washington, D.C. =

This is a list of properties and districts listed on the National Register of Historic Places in the Northwest quadrant of Washington, D.C. that are both east of Rock Creek and north of M Street.

This National Park Service list is complete through NPS recent listings posted October 23, 2026.

== Current listings ==
	Name on the Register	Image	Date listed	Location	Neighborhood	Description
1	Adams Memorial	Adams Memorial	March 16, 1972 (#72001420)	Webster St. and Rock Creek Church Rd., NW. 38°56′50″N 77°00′39″W	Petworth	
2	Administration Building, Carnegie Institute of Washington	Administration Building, Carnegie Institute of Washington	October 15, 1966 (#66000959)	1530 P St., NW. 38°54′34″N 77°02′10″W	Dupont Circle	
3	Alden, Babcock, Calvert Apartments	Alden, Babcock, Calvert Apartments	May 25, 1990 (#90000737)	2620 13th St., NW. 38°55′27″N 77°01′49″W	Columbia Heights	
4	All Souls Church, Unitarian	All Souls Church, Unitarian	December 7, 2020 (#100005905)	1500 Harvard St. NW; 38°55′34″N 77°02′10″W		
5	American Revolution Statuary	American Revolution Statuary	July 14, 1978 (#78000256)	Public buildings and various parks within DC; 38°54′25″N 77°02′29″W	Dupont Circle	14 statues including 11 in central DC, and Doctor John Witherspoon south of Dupont Circle
6	Larz Anderson House	Larz Anderson House	April 7, 1971 (#71000993)	2118 Massachusetts Ave., NW. 38°54′39″N 77°02′53″W	Dupont Circle	National headquarters of the Society of the Cincinnati
7	Andrew Rankin Memorial Chapel, Frederick Douglass Memorial Hall, Founders Library	Andrew Rankin Memorial Chapel, Frederick Douglass Memorial Hall, Founders Library	January 3, 2001 (#01000070)	2441 and 2365 6th St. NW; and 500 Howard Place NW; 38°55′21″N 77°01′13″W	Howard University	
8	Apartment Building at 2225 N Street	Apartment Building at 2225 N Street	September 9, 1994 (#94001043)	2225 N St., NW. 38°54′27″N 77°03′00″W	West End (Washington, D.C.)	
9	Apartments at 5922 13th Street, NW.	Apartments at 5922 13th Street, NW.	January 17, 2017 (#100000471)	5922 13th St., NW. 38°57′45″N 77°01′47″W	Brightwood	
10	Armed Forces Retirement Home-Washington	Armed Forces Retirement Home-Washington	December 5, 2007 (#07001237)	3700 N Capitol St NW; 38°56′11″N 77°00′33″W	Park View, Petworth	
11	Armstrong Manual Training School	Armstrong Manual Training School	August 16, 1996 (#96000893)	Junction of 1st and P Sts., NW; 38°54′32″N 77°00′49″W	Truxton Circle	
12	Army Medical Museum	Army Medical Museum	October 15, 1966 (#66000854)	Armed Forces Institute of Pathology Building, Walter Reed Army Medical Center, 13th St. and Fern Pl. 38°58′41″N 77°01′47″W	Walter Reed Army Medical Center	Original listed building has been demolished; collection is now in Maryland.
13	Francis Asbury Memorial	Francis Asbury Memorial	October 11, 2007 (#07001052)	Reservation 309-B, 16th & Mt. Pleasant Sts. NW; 38°55′47″N 77°02′13″W	Mount Pleasant	
14	Banneker Recreation Center	Banneker Recreation Center	April 28, 1986 (#86000876)	2500 Georgia Ave. NW; 38°55′20″N 77°01′25″W	Columbia Heights	
15	George M. Barker Company Warehouse	George M. Barker Company Warehouse	August 27, 2008 (#08000820)	1525 7th St., NW. 38°54′36″N 77°01′17″W	Logan Circle	
16	Battleground National Cemetery	Battleground National Cemetery	October 15, 1966 (#66000032)	6625 Georgia Ave., NW. 38°58′14″N 77°01′37″W	Brightwood	
17	Joseph Beale House	Joseph Beale House	May 8, 1973 (#73002073)	2301 Massachusetts Ave., NW. 38°54′46″N 77°03′05″W	Sheridan-Kalorama	
18	Perry Belmont House	Perry Belmont House	May 8, 1973 (#73002074)	1618 New Hampshire Ave., NW. 38°54′44″N 77°02′30″W	Dupont Circle	
19	Blagden Alley-Naylor Court Historic District	Blagden Alley-Naylor Court Historic District	November 16, 1990 (#90001734)	Bounded by O, 9th, M, & 10th Sts. NW. 38°54′44″N 77°01′33″W	Logan Circle	
20	Bloomingdale Historic District	Bloomingdale Historic District	November 26, 2018 (#100003129)	Bounded by Florida Ave., Channing, Bryant, North Capital & 2nd Sts. NW; 38°54′59″N 77°00′41″W	Bloomingdale	
21	Boulder Bridge and Ross Drive Bridge	Boulder Bridge and Ross Drive Bridge	March 20, 1980 (#80000348)	Rock Creek Park; 38°56′53″N 77°02′42″W	Rock Creek Park	Boulder Bridge extends to both sides of Rock Creek, while Ross Drive Bridge is west of it
22	Anthony Bowen YMCA	Anthony Bowen YMCA	October 3, 1983 (#83003523)	1816 12th St. NW; 38°54′53″N 77°02′25″W	U Street Corridor (Cardozo/Shaw)	
23	Brodhead-Bell-Morton Mansion	Brodhead-Bell-Morton Mansion	October 14, 1987 (#87001769)	1500 Rhode Island Ave., NW; 38°54′27″N 77°02′06″W	Logan Circle	
24	Blanche Kelso Bruce Elementary School	Blanche Kelso Bruce Elementary School	March 31, 2015 (#15000114)	770 Kenyon St., NW. 38°55′47″N 77°01′32″W	Park View	
25	Blanche K. Bruce House	Blanche K. Bruce House	May 15, 1975 (#75002046)	909 M St., NW; 38°54′21″N 77°01′29″W	Shaw	
26	Buildings at 1644–1666 Park Road NW	Buildings at 1644–1666 Park Road NW	November 6, 1986 (#86003019)	1644–1666 Park Rd. NW; 38°55′54″N 77°02′17″W	Mount Pleasant	
27	Buildings at 5000–5040 New Hampshire Avenue, NW	Buildings at 5000–5040 New Hampshire Avenue, NW	February 4, 2022 (#100007399)	5000–5040 New Hampshire Ave., NW; 38°57′06″N 77°00′46″W	Brightwood Park	
28	Lucinda Cady House	Lucinda Cady House	May 28, 1975 (#75002047)	7064 Eastern Ave., NW. 38°58′40″N 77°01′07″W	Takoma	
29	Cairo Apartment Building	Cairo Apartment Building	September 9, 1994 (#94001033)	1615 Q St., NW. 38°54′41″N 77°02′16″W	Dupont Circle	
30	Capital Traction Company Car Barn	Capital Traction Company Car Barn	May 22, 2013 (#13000290)	4615 14th St., N.W. 38°56′50″N 77°01′56″W	Sixteenth Street Heights	
31	Canadian Embassy	Canadian Embassy	April 3, 1973 (#73002076)	1746 Massachusetts Ave., NW. 38°54′29″N 77°02′26″W	Dupont Circle	Now the Embassy of Uzbekistan; also known as the Clarence Moore House
32	Francis L. Cardozo Senior High School	Francis L. Cardozo Senior High School	September 30, 1993 (#93001015)	Junction of 13th and Clifton Sts., NW. 38°55′14″N 77°01′48″W	Columbia Heights	
33	Mary Ann Shadd Cary House	Mary Ann Shadd Cary House	December 8, 1976 (#76002128)	1421 W. St., NW; 38°55′10″N 77°02′08″W	U Street Corridor (Cardozo/Shaw)	
34	Chapman Coal Company Garage and Stable	Chapman Coal Company Garage and Stable	October 23, 2013 (#13000845)	57 N St., NW. 38°54′27″N 77°00′40″W	Downtown	
35	Chilchester Arms Apartments	Chilchester Arms Apartments	January 24, 2017 (#100000559)	1388 Tuckerman St., NW; 38°58′02″N 77°01′59″W	Brightwood	
36	Civil War Fort Sites	Civil War Fort Sites	July 15, 1974 (#74000274)	Arc of sites surrounding central Washington in Maryland, Virginia, and D.C. 38°57′50″N 77°01′46″W	All quadrants	At the outset of the Civil War in 1861, Washington became a critical target for rebel attacks but was virtually without protection. The Union Army hastily began construction of a fortified defense line around the city, the physical remnants of which encompass these 19 earthwork forts, including Fort Stevens and Fort Slocum. See also National Register listings in central D.C., western NW D.C., NE D.C., SE D.C., Prince George's County, Maryland, and Fairfax County, Virginia.
37	Civil War Monuments in Washington, DC	Civil War Monuments in Washington, DC	September 20, 1978 (#78000257)	Various parks within the original boundaries of city 38°54′26″N 77°02′12″W	Various	18 statues about people and topics related to the Civil War, including 11 in central Washington, 6 in the NW quadrant, and 1 in Lincoln Park (NE & SE quadrants).
38	Clifton Terrace	Clifton Terrace	December 26, 2001 (#01001366)	1308,1312,1350 Clifton St. 38°55′19″N 77°01′52″W	Columbia Heights	
39	Codman-Davis House	Codman-Davis House	October 11, 1979 (#79003100)	2145 Decatur Pl., NW; 38°54′49″N 77°02′54″W	Sheridan-Kalorama	
40	Congressional Club	Congressional Club	October 6, 2011 (#11000717)	2001 New Hampshire Ave., NW; 38°55′02″N 77°02′09″W	U Street	
41	Connecticut Avenue Bridge	Connecticut Avenue Bridge	July 3, 2003 (#03000584)	Connecticut Ave., northwest of Rock Creek; 38°55′16″N 77°03′02″W	Sheridan-Kalorama and Woodley Park	Extends to both sides of Rock Creek
42	Calvin Coolidge Senior High School	Calvin Coolidge Senior High School	April 12, 2022 (#100007616)	6315 5th St. NW; 38°58′02″N 77°01′09″W		
43	Cosmos Club	Cosmos Club	April 3, 1973 (#73002079)	2121 Massachusetts Ave., NW. 38°54′41″N 77°02′54″W	Dupont Circle	Also known as the Richard H. Townsend House
44	Elliott Coues House	Elliott Coues House	May 15, 1975 (#75002049)	1726 N St., NW; 38°54′25″N 77°02′24″W	Dupont Circle	
45	Dorsch's White Cross Bakery	Dorsch's White Cross Bakery	February 3, 2012 (#11001076)	641 S St., NW; 38°54′52″N 77°01′16″W	U Street Corridor (Cardozo/Shaw)	
46	Dumbarton Bridge	Dumbarton Bridge	July 16, 1973 (#73002080)	Q St. over Rock Creek; 38°54′39″N 77°03′04″W	Dupont Circle	
47	Dupont Circle Historic District	Dupont Circle Historic District	July 21, 1978 (#78003056)	Roughly bounded by Florida and Rhode Island Aves., T, 17th, 21st, and 22nd Sts. 38°54′38″N 77°02′38″W	Dupont Circle	
48	John Joseph Earley House	John Joseph Earley House	May 8, 2025 (#100011776)	1710 Lamont Street NW; 38°55′53″N 77°02′23″W	Mount Pleasant	
49	Eighteen Hundred Block Park Road, NW	Eighteen Hundred Block Park Road, NW	November 15, 1978 (#78003057)	1801–1869 Park Rd., NW. 38°55′57″N 77°02′35″W	Mount Pleasant	
50	Embassy Building No. 10	Embassy Building No. 10	November 6, 1986 (#86003023)	3149 Sixteenth St. NW; 38°55′52″N 77°02′11″W	Columbia Heights	
51	Embassy Gulf Service Station	Embassy Gulf Service Station	September 30, 1993 (#93001014)	2200 P St., NW. 38°54′33″N 77°02′59″W	Dupont Circle	
52	Embassy of Mexico-MacVeagh House	Embassy of Mexico-MacVeagh House	February 13, 2013 (#13000001)	2829 16th St., NW; 38°55′32″N 77°02′09″W	Meridian Hill/ Columbia Heights	now the Mexican Cultural Institute
53	Emory United Methodist Church	Emory United Methodist Church	October 13, 2015 (#15000717)	6100 Georgia Ave., NW. 38°57′51″N 77°01′41″W	Brightwood	
54	Engine Company 12	Engine Company 12	June 6, 2007 (#07000537)	1626 N. Capitol St., NW; 38°54′43″N 77°00′35″W	Bloomingdale	
55	Engine Company No 21	Engine Company No 21	June 27, 2007 (#07000594)	1763 Lanier Place NW; 38°55′34″N 77°02′31″W	Lanier Heights	
56	Engine Company 22	Engine Company 22	May 18, 2011 (#11000282)	5760 Georgia Ave., NW; 38°57′36″N 77°01′42″W	Brightwood Park	
57	Euclid Apartments	Euclid Apartments	April 29, 2010 (#10000239)	1740 Euclid St, NW; 38°55′22″N 77°02′26″W	Adams Morgan	
58	Euram Building	Euram Building	July 9, 2025 (#100011988)	21 Dupont Circle NW; 38°54′32″N 77°02′37″W	Dupont Circle	
59	Evans-Tibbs House	Evans-Tibbs House	September 8, 1987 (#86003025)	1910 Vermont Ave. NW; 38°54′58″N 77°01′35″W	U Street Corridor (Cardozo/Shaw)	
60	Fire Department Headquarters-Fire Alarm Headquarters	Fire Department Headquarters-Fire Alarm Headquarters	May 18, 2011 (#11000286)	300 McMillan Dr., NW. 38°55′24″N 77°00′47″W	Bloomingdale	
61	First African New Church	First African New Church	January 29, 2009 (#08001375)	2105-07 10th St., NW. 38°55′06″N 77°01′33″W	U Street Corridor (Cardozo/Shaw)	
62	First Church of Christ, Scientist	First Church of Christ, Scientist	January 27, 2015 (#14001206)	1770 Euclid St., NW. 38°55′23″N 77°02′31″W	Adams Morgan	
63	Fort View Apartments	Fort View Apartments	January 21, 2010 (#09001264)	6000–6020 and 6030–6050 13th Place, N.W. 38°57′49″N 77°01′52″W	Brightwood	
64	Founding Church of Scientology	Founding Church of Scientology	September 6, 2022 (#100008142)	1812 19th St. NW; 38°54′53″N 77°02′37″W	Dupont Circle	Also known as the L. Ron Hubbard House.
65	Fourteenth Street Historic District	Fourteenth Street Historic District	November 9, 1994 (#94000992)	Roughly bounded by S, 12th, N and 15th Sts., NW. 38°54′30″N 77°01′47″W	Logan Circle	
66	Francis Junior High School	Francis Junior High School	February 23, 2026 (#100012732)	2425 N Street, N.W. 38°54′27″N 77°03′08″W		
67	Fraser Mansion	Fraser Mansion	August 19, 1975 (#75002054)	1701 20th St., NW. 38°54′46″N 77°02′42″W	Dupont Circle	
68	Frelinghuysen University, Former Classroom Building	Frelinghuysen University, Former Classroom Building	November 6, 1995 (#95001228)	1800 Vermont Ave., NW. 38°54′54″N 77°01′37″W	U Street Corridor (Cardozo/Shaw)	
69	The Fulford	The Fulford	March 6, 2018 (#100002179)	2518 17th St. NW; 38°55′26″N 77°02′21″W	Adams Morgan	
70	Fuller House	Fuller House	February 21, 1985 (#85000302)	2317 Ashmead Pl., NW; 38°55′08″N 77°02′53″W	Adams Morgan	
71	Nathaniel Parker Gage School	Nathaniel Parker Gage School	November 19, 2008 (#08001064)	2035 2nd St., NW. 38°55′04″N 77°00′52″W	Bloomingdale	
72	Garden Club of America Entrance Marker at Georgia Avenue	Garden Club of America Entrance Marker at Georgia Avenue	April 29, 2008 (#08000347)	Georgia Ave. at Kalmia Rd. & Alaska Ave. 38°59′02″N 77°01′36″W	Shepherd Park	
73	General Baking Company Bakery	General Baking Company Bakery	December 24, 2013 (#13000961)	2146 Georgia Ave., NW. 38°55′06″N 77°01′19″W	Pleasant Plains	
74	General Federation of Women's Clubs Headquarters	General Federation of Women's Clubs Headquarters	December 4, 1991 (#91002057)	1734 N St., NW. 38°54′25″N 77°02′25″W	Dupont Circle	
75	James Cardinal Gibbons Memorial	James Cardinal Gibbons Memorial	October 11, 2007 (#07001051)	Reservation 309-G, 16th St. & Park Rd. NW. 38°55′59″N 77°02′11″W	Mount Pleasant	
76	Glade Apartments	Glade Apartments	January 31, 2017 (#100000595)	1370–1372 Ft. Stevens Dr., NW. 38°57′50″N 77°02′00″W	Brightwood	
77	Gladstone and Hawarden Apartment Buildings	Gladstone and Hawarden Apartment Buildings	September 7, 1994 (#94001034)	1419 and 1423 R St., NW. 38°54′46″N 77°01′59″W	Logan Circle	
78	The Glenn Arms	The Glenn Arms	March 6, 2018 (#100002180)	2524 17th St. NW; 38°55′26″N 77°02′21″W	Adams Morgan	
79	Samuel Gompers House	Samuel Gompers House	September 23, 1974 (#74002161)	2122 1st St., NW; 38°55′02″N 77°00′46″W	Bloomingdale	
80	Grace Evangelical Lutheran Church	Grace Evangelical Lutheran Church	September 18, 2013 (#13000712)	4300 16th St., NW. 38°56′36″N 77°02′13″W	Crestwood	
81	Grace Reformed Church, Sunday School and Parish House	Grace Reformed Church, Sunday School and Parish House	April 18, 1991 (#91000396)	1405 15th St., NW. 38°54′32″N 77°02′03″W	Logan Circle	
82	Grant Circle Historic District	Grant Circle Historic District	October 13, 2015 (#15000718)	4–33 Grant Cir., NW. 38°56′35″N 77°01′09″W	Petworth	
83	Greater U Street Historic District	Greater U Street Historic District	December 31, 1998 (#98001557)	Roughly bounded by New Hampshire Ave., Florida Ave, 6th St., R St., and 16th St. 38°54′59″N 77°01′45″W	U Street	
84	Charlotte Forten Grimke House	Charlotte Forten Grimke House	May 11, 1976 (#76002129)	1608 R St., NW. 38°54′45″N 77°02′13″W	Dupont Circle	
85	Samuel Hahnemann Monument	Samuel Hahnemann Monument	October 11, 2007 (#07001055)	Reservation 64, Massachusetts & Rhode Island Aves. at Scott Cir. NW; 38°54′26″N 77°02′08″W	Golden Triangle	
86	Hampshire Garden Apartment Buildings	Hampshire Garden Apartment Buildings	September 9, 1994 (#94001031)	4912 New Hampshire Ave., 208, 222, 236 and 250 Farragut St., 4915 3rd St. and 215, 225 and 235 Emerson St., NW. 38°57′02″N 77°00′53″W	Brightwood Park	
87	Hebrew Home for the Aged and Jewish Social Service Agency	Hebrew Home for the Aged and Jewish Social Service Agency	July 25, 2014 (#14000436)	1125–1131 Spring Rd., NW. 38°56′10″N 77°01′43″W	Petworth	
88	Christian Heurich Mansion	Christian Heurich Mansion	June 23, 1969 (#69000296)	1307 New Hampshire Ave., NW. 38°54′29″N 77°02′40″W	Golden Triangle	
89	Hilltop Manor	Hilltop Manor	July 26, 2007 (#07000810)	3500 14th St., NW; 38°56′05″N 77°02′00″W	Columbia Heights	
90	Anthony Holmead Archeological Site	Anthony Holmead Archeological Site	April 27, 1995 (#95000527)	1801 23rd St., NW; 38°54′52″N 77°03′01″W	Kalorama Triangle	
91	Holt House	Holt House	April 24, 1973 (#73002090)	Adams Mill Rd. in the National Zoological Park; 38°55′31″N 77°02′50″W	Rock Creek Park	
92	Holzbeierlein Bakery	Holzbeierlein Bakery	April 10, 2017 (#100000845)	1815–1827 Wiltberger St., NW; 38°54′53″N 77°01′15″W	U Street Corridor (Cardozo/Shaw)	
93	The Homestead Apartments	The Homestead Apartments	February 14, 2018 (#100002111)	812 Jefferson St. NW; 38°57′18″N 77°01′29″W	Petworth	
94	House at 2437 Fifteenth Street, NW	House at 2437 Fifteenth Street, NW	March 16, 1988 (#88000171)	2437 Fifteenth St., NW; 38°55′20″N 77°02′11″W	Meridian Hill/ Columbia Heights	Also known as the Old Hungarian Embassy
95	House of Mercy	House of Mercy	January 10, 2025 (#100011245)	2000 Rosemount Avenue, NW; 38°55′59″N 77°02′48″W	Mount Pleasant	
96	Howard Theatre	Howard Theatre	February 15, 1974 (#74002162)	620 T St., NW. 38°54′55″N 77°01′17″W	U Street Corridor (Cardozo/Shaw)	
97	Charles Evans Hughes House	Charles Evans Hughes House	November 28, 1972 (#72001424)	2223 R St., NW; 38°54′45″N 77°02′58″W	Sheridan-Kalorama	
98	Immaculate Conception Church	Immaculate Conception Church	September 17, 2003 (#03000946)	1315 8th St., NW; 38°54′26″N 77°01′22″W	Logan Circle	
99	Indonesian Embassy	Indonesian Embassy	January 18, 1973 (#73002091)	2020 Massachusetts Ave., NW. 38°54′36″N 77°02′47″W	Dupont Circle	Also known as the Walsh-McLean House
100	Ingleside	Ingleside	January 8, 1987 (#86002936)	1818 Newton St. NW; 38°56′01″N 77°02′35″W	Mount Pleasant	
101	Japanese Embassy	Japanese Embassy	February 20, 1973 (#73002092)	2520 Massachusetts Ave., NW. 38°54′54″N 77°03′23″W	Sheridan-Kalorama	
102	Jost-Kuhn House	Jost-Kuhn House	April 5, 2016 (#16000127)	1354 Madison St. NW; 38°57′30″N 77°01′58″W	Sixteenth Street Heights	
103	Kalorama Park and Archeological Site	Kalorama Park and Archeological Site	April 21, 2016 (#16000193)	1875 Columbia Rd., NW; 38°55′13″N 77°02′41″W	Kalorama Triangle	House destroyed in 1937 subject of archeological investigation. Also part of Kalorama Triangle Historic District.
104	Kalorama Triangle Historic District	Kalorama Triangle Historic District	May 4, 1987 (#87000627)	Roughly bounded by Connecticut Ave., Columbia Rd., and Calvert St. 38°55′14″N 77°02′47″W	Kalorama Triangle	
105	Kelsey Temple Church of God in Christ	Kelsey Temple Church of God in Christ	September 18, 2017 (#16000684)	1435–1437 Park Rd., NW. 38°55′51″N 77°02′02″W	Columbia Heights	
106	Lafayette Apartment Building	Lafayette Apartment Building	September 7, 1994 (#94001044)	1605–1607 7th St., NW. 38°54′42″N 77°01′18″W	Logan Circle	
107	John Mercer Langston School	John Mercer Langston School	April 9, 2013 (#13000143)	43 P St., NW. 38°54′35″N 77°00′38″W	Truxton Circle	
108	Latin American Youth Center	Latin American Youth Center	June 30, 2025 (#100011967)	3045 15th Street, NW; 38°55′42″N 77°02′09″W		
109	LeDroit Park Historic District	LeDroit Park Historic District	February 25, 1974 (#74002165)	Bounded roughly by Florida and Rhode Island Aves., 2nd and Elm Sts., Howard University; 38°54′57″N 77°01′03″W	LeDroit Park	
110	George M. Lightfoot House	George M. Lightfoot House	January 15, 2014 (#13001070)	1329 Missouri Ave., NW; 38°57′43″N 77°01′51″W	Brightwood	
111	Lincoln Industrial Mission-Lincoln Memorial Congregational Church	Lincoln Industrial Mission-Lincoln Memorial Congregational Church	February 24, 1995 (#95000163)	1701 11th St., NW. 38°54′47″N 77°01′36″W	Logan Circle	
112	Lincoln Theatre	Lincoln Theatre	October 27, 1993 (#93001129)	1215 U St. NW; 38°55′01″N 77°01′46″W	U Street Corridor (Cardozo/Shaw)	
113	The Lindens	The Lindens	June 4, 1969 (#69000297)	2401 Kalorama Rd., NW. 38°55′06″N 77°03′13″W	Sheridan-Kalorama	
114	Logan Circle Historic District	Logan Circle Historic District	June 30, 1972 (#72001426)	Junction of Rhode Island and Vermont Aves. 38°54′35″N 77°01′49″W	Logan Circle	
115	Henry Wadsworth Longfellow Memorial	Henry Wadsworth Longfellow Memorial	October 11, 2007 (#07001056)	Reservation 150, Connecticut Ave., M & 18th Sts. NW. 38°54′28″N 77°02′30″W	Golden Triangle	
116	Lothrop Mansion	Lothrop Mansion	December 20, 1988 (#88001346)	2001 Connecticut Ave. 38°55′01″N 77°02′48″W	Adams Morgan	
117	Luther Place Memorial Church	Luther Place Memorial Church	July 16, 1973 (#73002096)	1226 Vermont Ave., NW. (Thomas Circle); 38°54′25″N 77°01′56″W	Logan Circle	
118	MacFarland Junior High School	MacFarland Junior High School	December 3, 2018 (#100003212)	4400 Iowa Ave. NW; 38°56′38″N 77°01′39″W	Petworth	
119	Manhattan Laundry	Manhattan Laundry	November 21, 1994 (#94001327)	1326–1346 Florida Ave., NW. 38°55′12″N 77°01′51″W	U Street Corridor (Cardozo/Shaw)	
120	Mansion at 2401 15th St., NW	Mansion at 2401 15th St., NW	January 28, 1991 (#90002147)	2401 15th St., NW. 38°55′18″N 77°02′06″W	Meridian Hill/ Columbia Heights	Also known as Meridian Hall
121	Guglielmo Marconi Memorial	Guglielmo Marconi Memorial	October 12, 2007 (#07001057)	Reservation 309A, 16th & Lamont Sts. NW; 38°55′56″N 77°02′13″W	Mount Pleasant	
122	Mary McLeod Bethune Council House National Historic Site	Mary McLeod Bethune Council House National Historic Site	October 15, 1982 (#82005389)	1318 Vermont Ave., NW; 38°54′27″N 77°01′52″W	Logan Circle	
123	Massachusetts Avenue Historic District	Massachusetts Avenue Historic District	October 22, 1974 (#74002166)	Both sides of Massachusetts Ave. between 17th St. and Observatory Circle, NW; 38°54′50″N 77°03′06″W	Dupont Circle, Sheridan-Kalorama, and Woodland-Normanstone Terrace	
124	The Maycroft	The Maycroft	October 17, 2012 (#12000864)	1474 Columbia Rd., NW. 38°55′37″N 77°02′07″W	Columbia Heights	
125	McMillan Park Reservoir Historic District	McMillan Park Reservoir Historic District	February 20, 2013 (#13000022)	Roughly bounded by Hobart Pl., NW, Michigan Ave., NW, 1st, 4th, Bryant & North Capitol Sts., NW; 38°55′28″N 77°00′53″W	Bloomingdale	
126	McCormick Apartments	McCormick Apartments	April 3, 1973 (#73002100)	1785 Massachusetts Ave., NW; 38°54′33″N 77°02′30″W	Dupont Circle	Also known as the Andrew Mellon Building
127	Meeting House of the Friends Meeting of Washington	Meeting House of the Friends Meeting of Washington	September 6, 1990 (#90001294)	2111 Florida Ave., NW. 38°54′46″N 77°02′52″W	Sheridan-Kalorama	
128	Meridian Hill Historic District	Meridian Hill Historic District	May 21, 2014 (#14000211)	2201–2319 15th, 2400–2600 blocks 15th & 16th, 2600–3000 blocks 16th Sts., NW., 1600 blk. of Crescent Pl., NW. 38°55′16″N 77°02′10″W	Meridian Hill/ Adams Morgan-Columbia Heights	
129	Meridian Hill Park	Meridian Hill Park	October 25, 1974 (#74000273)	Bounded by 16th, Euclid, 15th, and W Sts., NW. 38°55′16″N 77°02′10″W	Meridian Hill/ Columbia Heights	
130	Meridian House	Meridian House	May 8, 1973 (#73002101)	1630 Crescent Pl., NW. 38°55′13″N 77°02′18″W	Meridian Hill/ Adams Morgan	
131	Meridian Manor	Meridian Manor	March 29, 2001 (#01000324)	1424 Chapin St., NW; 38°55′17″N 77°01′59″W	Meridian Hill/ Columbia Heights	
132	Meridian Mansions	Meridian Mansions	July 28, 1983 (#83001417)	2400 16th St. NW; 38°55′17″N 77°02′13″W	Meridian Hill/ Adams Morgan	
133	Military Road School	Military Road School	July 25, 2003 (#03000674)	1375 Missouri Ave., NW; 38°57′43″N 77°01′58″W	Brightwood	
134	Miner Normal School	Miner Normal School	October 11, 1991 (#91001490)	2565 Georgia Ave., NW. 38°55′24″N 77°01′21″W	Howard University	
135	Mount Pleasant Historic District	Mount Pleasant Historic District	October 5, 1987 (#87001726)	Roughly bounded by Sixteenth & Harvard Sts., Rock Creek Church Rd., & Adams Mill Rd. 38°55′53″N 77°02′22″W	Mount Pleasant	
136	Mount Vernon Square Historic District	Mount Vernon Square Historic District	September 3, 1999 (#99001070)	Roughly bounded by New York Ave., 7th St., N St., and 1st St. NW; 38°54′24″N 77°01′04″W	Mount Vernon Square	Extends to both sides of M Street
137	Mount Vernon West Historic District	Mount Vernon West Historic District	September 9, 1999 (#99001071)	Roughly bounded by Rhode Island Ave., 6th St., Massachusetts Ave., and Vermont Ave. 38°54′26″N 77°01′34″W	Mount Vernon Square	Also known as Shaw Historic District. Extends to both sides of M Street.
138	The Mozart	The Mozart	August 4, 2026 (#100013260)	1630 Fuller Street NW; 38°55′29″N 77°02′17″W		
139	National Home for Destitute Colored Women and Children	National Home for Destitute Colored Women and Children	October 5, 2022 (#100008262)	733 Euclid St. NW; 38°55′27″N 77°01′25″W	Pleasant Plains	
140	Northumberland Apartments	Northumberland Apartments	March 25, 1980 (#80004304)	2039 New Hampshire Ave., NW; 38°55′04″N 77°02′09″W	U Street	
141	Northeast No. 2 Boundary Marker of the Original District of Columbia	Northeast No. 2 Boundary Marker of the Original District of Columbia	November 1, 1996 (#96001257)	6980 Maple Ave., NW; 38°58′32″N 77°00′53″W	Takoma	
142	O Street Market	O Street Market	April 28, 1995 (#95000442)	1400 7th St., NW. 38°54′31″N 77°01′11″W	Logan Circle	
143	Old Chinese Legation	Old Chinese Legation	June 17, 2024 (#100010419)	2001 19th Street NW; 38°55′02″N 77°02′56″W		
144	Old Korean Legation	Old Korean Legation	September 9, 2024 (#100010773)	1500 13th Street NW (15 Logan Circle NW); 38°54′37″N 77°01′47″W		
145	Olympia Apartments	Olympia Apartments	June 9, 2003 (#03000534)	1368 Euclid St. NW; 38°55′25″N 77°01′54″W	Columbia Heights	
146	General Oliver Otis Howard House	General Oliver Otis Howard House	February 12, 1974 (#74002163)	607 Howard Pl. 38°55′23″N 77°01′20″W	Howard University	
147	Thomas Nelson Page House	Thomas Nelson Page House	September 5, 1975 (#75002053)	1759 R St., NW. 38°54′46″N 77°02′28″W	Dupont Circle	
148	Park Road Courts	Park Road Courts	July 3, 2012 (#12000380)	1346 Park Rd., NW; 38°55′49″N 77°01′53″W	Columbia Heights	
149	Park Tower	Park Tower	October 30, 1989 (#89001744)	2440 Sixteenth St., NW. 38°55′19″N 77°02′14″W	Adams Morgan	
150	Park View Christian Church	Park View Christian Church	December 29, 2014 (#14001082)	625 Park Rd., NW. 38°55′59″N 77°01′22″W	Park View	
151	Park View Playground and Field House	Park View Playground and Field House	February 24, 2014 (#14000014)	693 Otis Pl., NW. 38°56′06″N 77°01′17″W	Park View	
152	Park View School	Park View School	May 1, 2013 (#13000213)	3570 Warder Street. NW,. 38°56′04″N 77°01′16″W	Park View	
153	Park Vista and Pine Manor Apartments	Park Vista and Pine Manor Apartments	October 18, 2016 (#16000725)	5807–5825 14th St., NW. 38°57′40″N 77°02′00″W	Brightwood	
154	W. H. Penland & Company	W. H. Penland & Company	December 29, 1994 (#94001510)	1211–1219 13th St., NW. 38°54′22″N 77°01′45″W	Logan Circle	Also known as Proctor Alley Livery Stable and Mount Vernon Stables
155	Frances Perkins House	Frances Perkins House	July 17, 1991 (#91002048)	2326 California St., NW. 38°54′55″N 77°03′07″W	Sheridan-Kalorama	
156	Petworth Branch Library	Petworth Branch Library	December 3, 2018 (#100003149)	4200 Kansas Ave. NW; 38°56′32″N 77°01′34″W	Petworth	
157	Petworth Gardens	Petworth Gardens	November 10, 2008 (#08001029)	124, 126, 128, and 130 Webster St., NW. 38°56′39″N 77°00′47″W	Petworth	
158	Duncan Phillips House	Duncan Phillips House	August 14, 1973 (#73002108)	1600–1614 21st St., NW. 38°54′40″N 77°02′51″W	Dupont Circle	
159	Pierce-Klingle Mansion	Pierce-Klingle Mansion	October 10, 1973 (#73000223)	3545 Williamsburg Lane, NW; 38°56′18″N 77°03′00″W	Cleveland Park	
160	Pink Palace	Pink Palace	August 5, 1991 (#91000916)	2600 16th St., NW. 38°55′23″N 77°02′13″W	Meridian Hill/ Adams Morgan	
161	The Plymouth	The Plymouth	June 2, 1986 (#86001242)	1236 Eleventh St. NW; 38°54′23″N 77°01′39″W	Logan Circle	
162	Prince Hall Masonic Temple	Prince Hall Masonic Temple	September 15, 1983 (#83001418)	1000 U St., NW; 38°55′00″N 77°01′35″W	U Street Corridor (Cardozo/Shaw)	
163	Potomac Electric Power Company Substation No. 13	Potomac Electric Power Company Substation No. 13	June 3, 2019 (#100004072)	1001 Harvard St. NW; 38°55′36″N 77°01′35″W	Columbia Heights	
164	Potomac Electric Power Company Substation No. 25	Potomac Electric Power Company Substation No. 25	June 6, 2019 (#100004073)	2119 Champlain St. NW; 38°55′08″N 77°02′25″W	Adams Morgan	
165	Walter Reed Army Medical Center (WRAMC) Historic District	Walter Reed Army Medical Center (WRAMC) Historic District	March 9, 2015 (#15000061)	6900 Georgia Ave., NW; 38°58′30″N 77°01′48″W	Brightwood	
166	Zalmon Richards House	Zalmon Richards House	October 15, 1966 (#66000866)	1301 Corcoran St., NW; 38°54′42″N 77°01′49″W	Logan Circle	
167	Riggs-Tompkins Building	Riggs-Tompkins Building	January 5, 1987 (#86002915)	1403–1405 and 1413 Park Rd. NW and 3300, 3306–3316, 3328, and 3336 Fourteenth St. NW; 38°55′50″N 77°01′59″W	Columbia Heights	
168	The Ritz	The Ritz	August 7, 2026 (#100013279)	1631 Euclid Street NW; 38°55′24″N 77°02′17″W		An apartment building.
169	Rock Creek and Potomac Parkway Historic District	Rock Creek and Potomac Parkway Historic District	May 4, 2005 (#05000367)	Rock Creek and Potomac Parkway; 38°54′47″N 77°03′16″W	NW	Extends to both sides of Rock Creek
170	Rock Creek Church Yard and Cemetery	Rock Creek Church Yard and Cemetery	August 12, 1977 (#77001498)	Webster St. and Rock Creek Church Rd., NW. 38°56′52″N 77°00′47″W	Fort Totten	
171	Rock Creek Park Historic District	Rock Creek Park Historic District	October 23, 1991 (#91001524)	Roughly, Rock Creek Park from Klingle Rd. to Montgomery County line 38°57′27″N 77°02′42″W	NW	See Rock Creek Park. Extends to both sides of Rock Creek.
172	Theodore Roosevelt Senior High School	Theodore Roosevelt Senior High School	December 3, 2018 (#100003213)	4301 13th St. NW; 38°56′37″N 77°01′47″W	Petworth	
173	St. Luke's Episcopal Church	St. Luke's Episcopal Church	May 11, 1976 (#76002131)	15th and Church Sts., NW; 38°54′36″N 77°02′07″W	Dupont Circle	NHL - First independent black Episcopal parish in Washington
174	St. Matthew's Cathedral and Rectory	St. Matthew's Cathedral and Rectory	January 24, 1974 (#74002173)	1725–1739 Rhode Island Ave., NW. 38°54′22″N 77°02′24″W	Golden Triangle	
175	St. Paul's Episcopal Church	St. Paul's Episcopal Church	March 16, 1972 (#72001433)	Rock Creek Church Rd. and Webster St., NW. 38°56′49″N 77°00′44″W	Fort Totten	
176	Brigadier General George P. Scriven House	Brigadier General George P. Scriven House	August 27, 2013 (#13000620)	1300 New Hampshire Ave., NW. 38°54′27″N 77°02′44″W	Dupont Circle	
177	Seventh Street Savings Bank	Seventh Street Savings Bank	September 17, 2003 (#03000944)	1300 7th St. NW; 38°54′26″N 77°01′20″W	Logan Circle	
178	Shaw Junior High School	Shaw Junior High School	December 22, 2008 (#08001206)	7th St., and Rhode Island Ave., NW; 38°54′44″N 77°01′19″W	Logan Circle	
179	Sheridan-Kalorama Historic District	Sheridan-Kalorama Historic District	October 30, 1989 (#89001743)	Roughly bounded by Rock Creek Park, Connecticut Ave., NW., Florida Ave., NW., 22nd St., NW., and P St., NW. 38°54′56″N 77°03′06″W	Sheridan-Kalorama	
180	Shrine of the Sacred Heart	Shrine of the Sacred Heart	July 30, 2026 (#100013249)	3211 Pine Street NW (3211 Sacred Heart Way); 38°55′53″N 77°02′10″W		
181	Billy Simpson's House of Seafood and Steaks	Billy Simpson's House of Seafood and Steaks	March 17, 2009 (#09000152)	3815 Georgia Avenue, NW; 38°56′17″N 77°01′27″W	Petworth	
182	Sixteenth Street Historic District	Sixteenth Street Historic District	August 25, 1978 (#78003060)	16th St. between Scott Cir. and Florida Ave. NW; 38°54′46″N 77°02′13″W	Dupont Circle	
183	John Fox Slater Elementary School	John Fox Slater Elementary School	April 9, 2013 (#13000144)	45 P St., NW. 38°54′35″N 77°00′38″W	Truxton Circle	Documentation
184	Southern Aid Society-Dunbar Theater Building	Southern Aid Society-Dunbar Theater Building	November 6, 1986 (#86003071)	1901–1903 Seventh St. NW; 38°54′56″N 77°01′19″W	U Street Corridor (Cardozo/Shaw)	
185	Spencer Carriage House and Stable	Spencer Carriage House and Stable	August 29, 1996 (#96000894)	2123 Twining Crt., NW; 38°54′33″N 77°02′53″W	Dupont Circle	
186	Standard Material Company-Gyro Motor Company	Standard Material Company-Gyro Motor Company	September 30, 2014 (#14000799)	770–774 Girard St. NW; 38°55′33″N 77°01′30″W	Pleasant Plains	
187	Strivers' Section Historic District	Strivers' Section Historic District	February 6, 1985 (#85000239)	Roughly bounded by New Hampshire and Florida Aves., 17th and 18th Sts. along T, U, and Willard Sts. NW; 38°55′00″N 77°02′26″W	Dupont Circle	
188	Studio House	Studio House	April 27, 1995 (#95000528)	2306 Massachusetts Ave., NW. 38°54′43″N 77°03′05″W	Sheridan-Kalorama	
189	Sulgrave Club	Sulgrave Club	December 5, 1972 (#72001434)	1801 Massachusetts Ave., NW. 38°54′34″N 77°02′32″W	Dupont Circle	Also known as Herbert Wadsworth House
190	Charles Sumner School	Charles Sumner School	December 20, 1979 (#79003150)	17th and M Sts., NW; 38°54′21″N 77°02′18″W	Golden Triangle	
191	Tabard Inn	Tabard Inn	June 22, 2020 (#100005295)	1737–1741 N St. NW; 38°54′27″N 77°02′24″W	Dupont Circle	
192	Takoma Park Historic District	Takoma Park Historic District	June 30, 1983 (#83001416)	Roughly bounded by DC/MD boundary, 7th, Piney Branch, Aspen, and Fern Sts. 38°58′31″N 77°01′11″W	Takoma	
193	Tenth Precinct Station House	Tenth Precinct Station House	November 10, 1986 (#86003063)	750 Park Rd. NW; 38°55′57″N 77°01′32″W	Park View	
194	Mary Church Terrell House	Mary Church Terrell House	May 15, 1975 (#75002055)	326 T St., NW; 38°54′56″N 77°01′00″W	Le Droit Park	
195	Third Baptist Church	Third Baptist Church	November 26, 2008 (#08001094)	1546 5th St., NW. 38°54′38″N 77°01′09″W	Logan Circle	
196	Alma Thomas House	Alma Thomas House	July 28, 1987 (#86002923)	1530 Fifteenth St. NW; 38°54′39″N 77°02′06″W	Dupont Circle	
197	Tivoli Theatre	Tivoli Theatre	April 10, 1985 (#85000716)	3301–3325 14th St. NW; 38°55′50″N 77°02′39″W	Columbia Heights	
198	Trinity Towers	Trinity Towers	December 26, 2001 (#01001367)	3023 14th St., NW; 38°55′41″N 77°01′57″W	Columbia Heights	
199	Truck Company F	Truck Company F	June 6, 2007 (#07000539)	1336–1338 Park Rd. NW; 38°55′49″N 77°01′54″W	Columbia Heights	
200	True Reformer Building	True Reformer Building	January 9, 1989 (#88003063)	1200 U St., NW; 38°55′00″N 77°01′43″W	U Street Corridor (Cardozo/Shaw)	
201	Tucker House and Myers House	Tucker House and Myers House	August 14, 1973 (#73002119)	2310–2320 S St., NW. 38°54′50″N 77°03′07″W	Sheridan-Kalorama	
202	Twin Oaks Playground and Field House	Twin Oaks Playground and Field House	February 3, 2020 (#100004941)	4025 14th St. NW; 38°56′26″N 77°01′56″W	Petworth	
203	U.S. Soldiers' and Airmen's Home	U.S. Soldiers' and Airmen's Home	February 11, 1974 (#74002176)	Rock Creek Church Rd., NW; 38°56′27″N 77°00′44″W	Park View, Petworth	
204	United States Daughters of 1812, National Headquarters	United States Daughters of 1812, National Headquarters	December 12, 1997 (#97001469)	1461 Rhode Island Ave., NW; 38°54′30″N 77°02′02″W	Logan Circle	
205	Van View	Van View	December 29, 2014 (#14001083)	7714 13th St., NW. 38°59′02″N 77°01′48″W	Shepherd Park	
206	Walsh Stable	Walsh Stable	November 6, 1986 (#86002932)	1511 (rear) 22nd St. NW; 38°54′36″N 77°02′54″W	Dupont Circle	
207	Warder-Totten House	Warder-Totten House	April 14, 1972 (#72001437)	2633 16th St., NW. 38°55′26″N 77°02′10″W	Meridian Hill/ Columbia Heights	
208	Wardman Flats	Wardman Flats	October 10, 2019 (#100004500)	Square 519 bounded by 3rd, 4th& R Sts., & Florida Ave. NW; 38°54′47″N 77°00′57″W	Truxton Circle	
209	Wardman Row	Wardman Row	July 27, 1984 (#84000871)	1416–1440 R St. NW; 38°54′44″N 77°02′02″W	Logan Circle	
210	Washington Animal Rescue League Animal Shelter	Washington Animal Rescue League Animal Shelter	June 22, 2020 (#1000052968)	71 O St. NW; 38°54′31″N 77°00′41″W	Truxton Circle	
211	Washington Club	Washington Club	December 5, 1972 (#72001438)	15 Dupont Circle, NW. 38°54′36″N 77°02′33″W	Dupont Circle	Also known as Patterson House
212	Washington Heights Historic District	Washington Heights Historic District	September 27, 2006 (#06000875)	Bounded by Columbia Rd., NW, 19th St. NW, 18th St. NW and Florida Ave. NW; 38°55′07″N 77°02′35″W	Adams Morgan	
213	Margaret Murray Washington School	Margaret Murray Washington School	November 22, 2011 (#11000843)	27 O St., NW; 38°54′31″N 77°00′37″W	Truxton Circle	
214	Washington Railway and Electric Company Garage	Washington Railway and Electric Company Garage	February 5, 2014 (#13001133)	2112 Georgia Ave., NW. 38°55′06″N 77°01′20″W	Pleasant Plains	
215	Daniel Webster Memorial	Daniel Webster Memorial	October 12, 2007 (#07001063)	Reservation 62, Massachusetts and Rhode Island Aves. at Scott Circle, NW. 38°54′26″N 77°02′14″W	NW	
216	Marjorie Webster Junior College Historic District	Marjorie Webster Junior College Historic District	February 24, 2014 (#14000015)	1638 & 1640 Kalmia Rd., NW., 7753 & 7775 17th St., NW. 38°59′08″N 77°02′19″W	Colonial Village	
217	Phyllis Wheatley YWCA	Phyllis Wheatley YWCA	October 6, 1983 (#83003532)	901 Rhode Island Ave. NW; 38°54′42″N 77°01′28″W	Shaw	
218	David White House	David White House	January 7, 1976 (#76002133)	1459 Girard St., NW; 38°55′32″N 77°02′04″W	Columbia Heights	
219	White-Meyer House	White-Meyer House	January 20, 1988 (#87002293)	1624 Crescent Pl., NW; 38°55′13″N 77°02′15″W	Adams Morgan	
220	Whitelaw Hotel	Whitelaw Hotel	July 14, 1993 (#93000595)	1839 13th St. NW; 38°54′55″N 77°01′45″W	U Street Corridor (Cardozo/Shaw)	
221	Whittemore House	Whittemore House	July 16, 1973 (#73002126)	1526 New Hampshire Ave., NW. 38°54′39″N 77°02′35″W	Dupont Circle	
222	James Ormond Wilson Normal School	James Ormond Wilson Normal School	March 31, 2015 (#15000115)	1100 Harvard St., NW; 38°55′36″N 77°01′38″W	Columbia Heights	
223	Woodrow Wilson House	Woodrow Wilson House	October 15, 1966 (#66000873)	2340 S St., NW; 38°54′49″N 77°03′08″W	Sheridan-Kalorama	
224	Windsor Lodge	Windsor Lodge	December 8, 1976 (#76002134)	2139–2141 Wyoming Ave., NW; 38°55′03″N 77°02′57″W	Sheridan-Kalorama	
225	Carter G. Woodson House	Carter G. Woodson House	May 11, 1976 (#76002135)	1538 9th St., NW; 38°54′36″N 77°01′27″W	Logan Circle	
226	Robert Simpson Woodward House	Robert Simpson Woodward House	January 7, 1976 (#76002136)	1513 16th St., NW; 38°54′32″N 77°02′11″W	Dupont Circle	Home of geologist Robert Simpson Woodward
227	Wyoming Apartments	Wyoming Apartments	September 27, 1983 (#83001414)	2022 Columbia Rd., NW; 38°55′02″N 77°02′45″W	Adams Morgan	
228	Youth Pride, Inc. (aka Pride, Inc.)	Youth Pride, Inc. (aka Pride, Inc.)	August 29, 2024 (#100010724)	1536 U Street NW; 38°55′01″N 77°02′10″W		
