= The Yard (Howard University) =

- Andrew Rankin Memorial Chapel, Frederick Douglass Memorial Hall, Founders Library
- U.S. National Register of Historic Places
- U.S. National Historic Landmark District
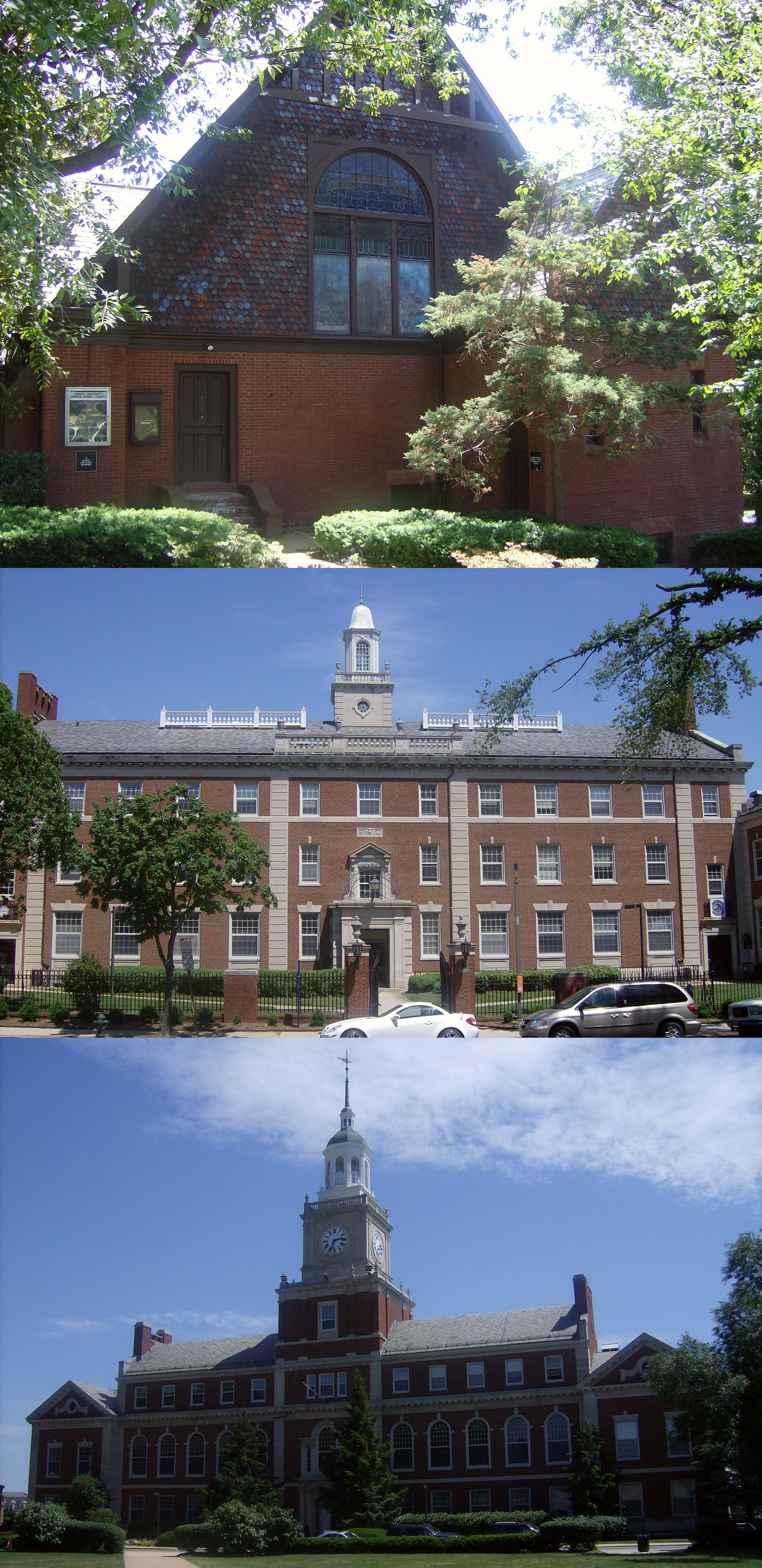
- (top to bottom) Andrew Rankin Chapel, Douglass Hall, and Founders Library

- Location within the District of Columbia Location within the United States
- Location: 2441 and 2365 6th St. NW; and 500 Howard Place NW, Washington, D.C.
- Area: 10 acres (4.0 ha)
- NRHP reference No.: 01000070

Significant dates
- Added to NRHP: January 3, 2001
- Designated NHLD: January 3, 2001

The Yard is one of the main quadrangles on the campus of Howard University in Northwest Washington, DC. The Yard is the principal open space at the northern end of the academic portion of the campus, flanked by nine academic buildings. It is the site of a variety of campus gatherings, most notably for its annual Homecoming festivities, known as "Yardfest". The quadrangle and three buildings, Andrew Rankin Memorial Chapel, Frederick Douglass Memorial Hall, and Founders Library, are a listed National Historic Landmark, important for their role in the advancement of civil rights in education during the 20th century.

== Description ==
The Yard is located in the northern half of Howard University's campus in Washington, D.C., bounded roughly on the west by 6th Street NW, the east by 5th Street NW, and the south by Howard Place. The southern edge of The Yard directly abuts Howard Place, while it is separated from the other roads by intervening buildings. To the north of the buildings, facing The Yard, lies the school's athletic facilities and some of its residence halls. The Yard is a roughly flat grassy expanse, dotted with trees around its edges, and traversed by an intersecting network of paved paths. At the center of The Yard's northern half, eight paths radiate from a paved circle. A service road runs along the eastern edge of the grass, between it and the flanking buildings.

=== North side buildings ===
Two buildings face The Yard from the north. They are the Ira Aldridge Theatre and the Chadwick A. Boseman College of Fine Arts. These buildings house a portion of the school's theatrical and arts programs.

=== East side buildings ===
Three buildings face The Yard from the east. These three buildings are the Armour J. Blackburn Center, Alain Locke Hall, and the Human Ecology Building.

=== South side buildings ===
Facing The Yard, across Howard Place from the south, are the combined Founders and Undergraduate Libraries, along with the Andrew Rankin Chapel. Rankin Chapel, built in 1894, is the school's main religious meeting place. Founders Library, built in 1939, has historically housed the Howard University School of Law and its law library.

=== West side buildings ===
There are two buildings on the west side of The Yard. The Carnegie Building, built in 1910, which houses classrooms and offices, and the Douglass Memorial Hall, built in 1935, which houses classrooms as well.

== Historic significance ==
Three of the four buildings on the south and west sides of The Yard are historically significant for the role they played in the legal school desegregation battles of the 20th century. Howard's law school was the epicenter where the legal strategies were formulated, leading to the landmark Brown v. Board of Education Supreme Court case. This legal work often took place in Founders Library. Research in support of this work often took place in departments located in Douglass Memorial Hall. In addition, Rankin Chapel was the site of conferences held to discuss ongoing legal challenges. As a group, these three buildings, along with the Carnegie Building and the quadrangle itself, were declared a U.S. National Historic Landmark in 2001.

== See also ==
- General Oliver Otis Howard House
- List of National Historic Landmarks in Washington, D.C.
- National Register of Historic Places listings in the upper NW Quadrant of Washington, D.C.
