= Pleasant Plains (Washington, D.C.) =

Neighborhood of Washington, D.C.

- Neighborhood of Washington, D.C.
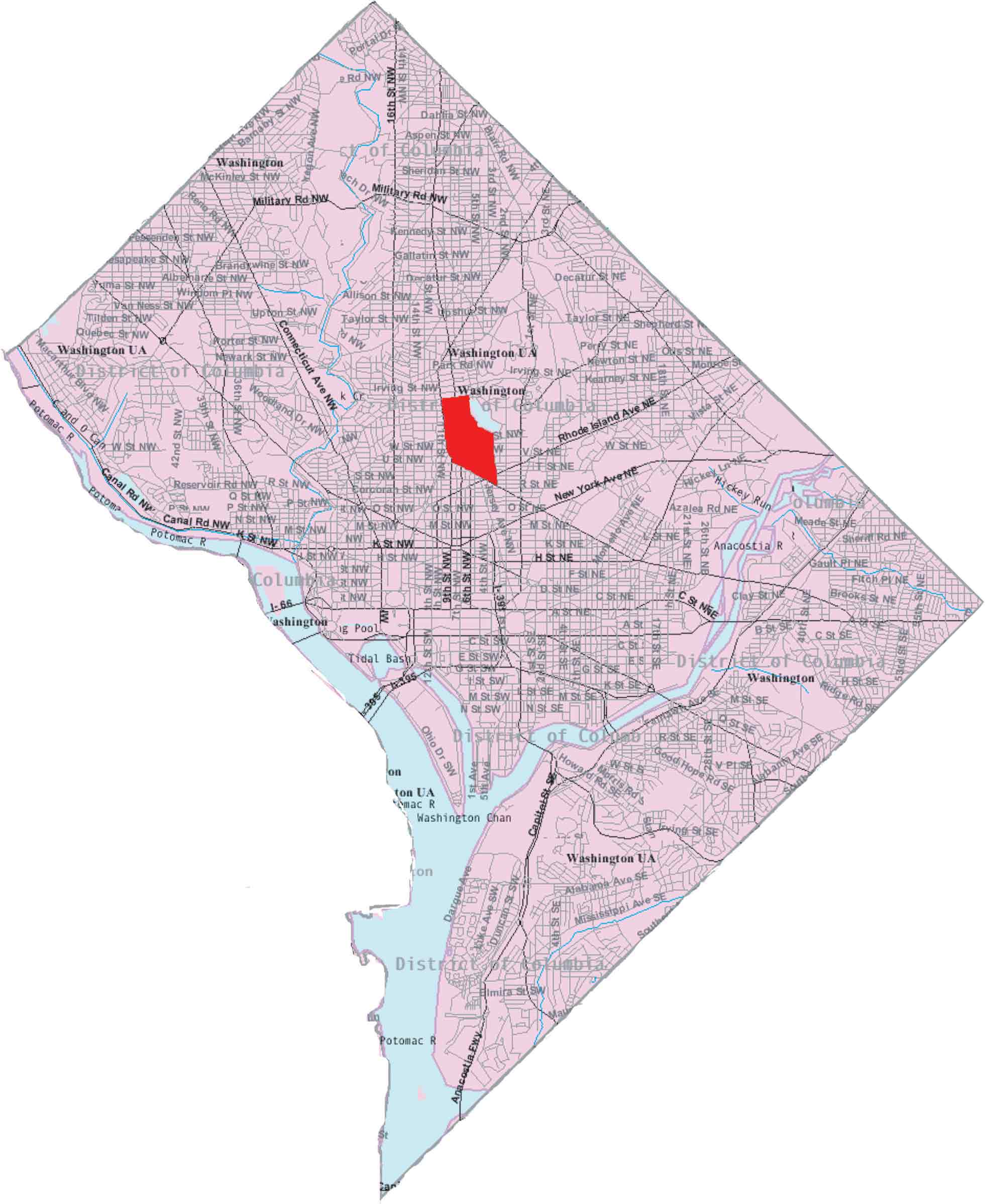
- Pleasant Plains within the District of Columbia
- Coordinates: 38.9288°N 77.0233°W
- Country: United States
- District: Washington, D.C.
- Ward: Ward 1

Government
  - Councilmember: Brianne Nadeau
- Postal code: ZIP code

Pleasant Plains is a neighborhood in central Washington, D.C. largely occupied by Howard University. For this reason it is also sometimes referred to as Howard Town or, less frequently, Howard Village.

It is situated in the Northwest quadrant of the city and bordered by 2nd Street, and McMillan Reservoir to the east; Florida Avenue and Barry Place to the south; Sherman Avenue to the west; and Harvard Street to the north. It is flanked on the eastern side by the Washington Veteran Affairs Medical Center and Washington Hospital Center, and by the Columbia Heights and Park View neighborhoods on the west and north sides.

Pleasant Plains, Howard University notwithstanding, is a residential neighborhood. A large portion of its residents are Howard affiliates, either students or employees. One of its major community anchors is the Banneker Recreation Center on Georgia Avenue, which reopened in July 2007 after a year of renovations. The adjacent Benjamin Banneker Academic High School has ranked among the 100 best public schools in the United States.

Pleasant Plains is in Ward 1.

== History ==
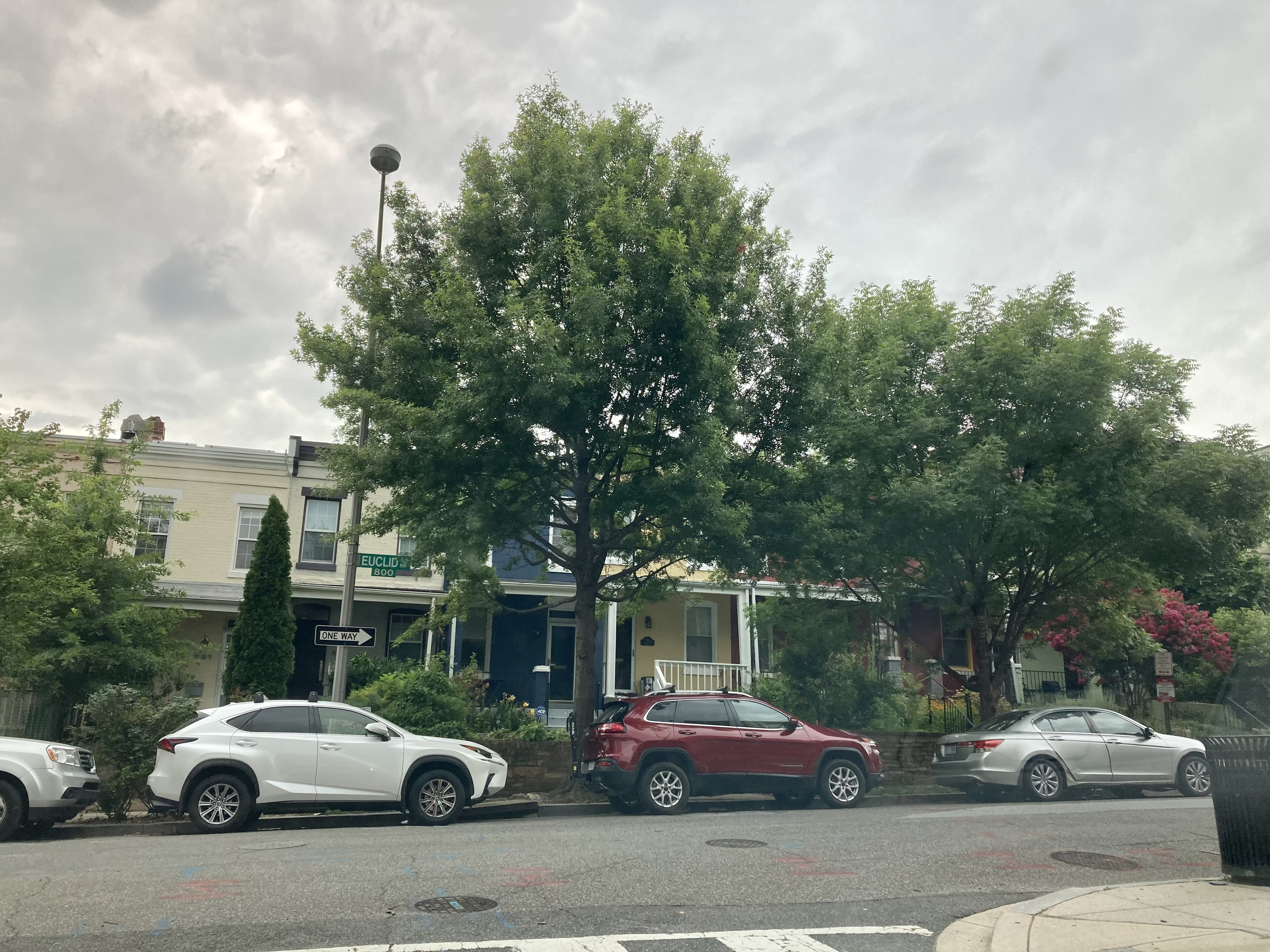
Intersection of 9th St. and Euclid St. NW, in Pleasant Plains, July 2021.

The neighborhood is a small portion of a large colonial estate named "Pleasant Plains," owned by the Holmead family. The property stretched from today’s Spring Road to Columbia Road, and from Georgia Avenue to Rock Creek. The estate was apportioned and sold off over the course of the 19th century and divided into suburbs until it was annexed by the city of Washington in 1878 and became neighborhoods of the city. Essentially, the Pleasant Plains neighborhood is the area of the Holmead estate that was not settled as part of Columbia Heights. (In 1918, the city returned the name "Pleasant Plains" to the entire area of the original estate, but this is a semi-formal name for the section of town and not a neighborhood in and of itself.)

The 1879 Hopkins real estate map shows the Pleasant Plains subdivision being located south of Park Road, east of 14th Street, west of Sherman Avenue, and north of Florida Avenue. From Howard down to Florida Avenue was a black-only neighborhood known as Howard Town. Residents of the adjacent LeDroit Park neighborhood built fences to keep black Howard Town residents out, and the black residents then tore down the fences in protest. The fences largely came down in 1901, and blacks began moving into LeDroit Park, effectively ending the segregated Howard Town section.

=== Howard Town Center ===
In late 2002, Howard University and the District of Columbia began planning Howard Town Center, a $56 million mixed-use residential and retail project adjacent to the university campus in Pleasant Plains. Howard Town Center was plotted on the west side of lower Georgia Avenue - the neighborhood's major thoroughfare - between V Street and Barry Place NW; the land, owned by the District, was given to Howard University in exchange for a Howard tract on the east side of Florida Avenue NW that is currently used for surface parking. The development was designed to include 65,000 feet of retail (including a Fresh Grocer supermarket), 225 apartments (for market residents rather than university students), and a 7-level, 520-car parking garage.

The university and city announced the project, and their selections for its developers, in April 2003. However, the announcement led immediately to a legal battle. Peoples Involvement Corporation, a tenant in the former Bond Bakery Building at W and Georgia (part of the tract the city was ceding to Howard for the project), claimed that it had been promised ownership of the Bond building in the 1970s. The city countered that there was no documentation of either a transfer of ownership or an intention to file one. In 2005, a judge in the D.C. Superior court found in the city's favor, and in December 2006, D.C. Councilmember Jim Graham introduced legislation (which passed the Council) to at last initiate the construction of Howard Town Center in Pleasant Plains in 2007.

== Geography ==
The neighborhood is a rectangle, narrow east to west, positioned on the boundary between NW and NE Washington, about halfway between the center of DC and the Maryland border. The Washington Post listed the neighborhood's borders in 2009 as the area bounded by Park Road NW to the north, the south - Florida Avenue, east - Warder and Sixth Streets, and west - Sherman Avenue NW. The Civic Association recognizes additional area to the west - to 14th Street. The Washington Post's inclusion of the area between Warder Street and Georgia Avenue south of Park Road conflicts with the historical borders of neighboring Park View which includes this area.

== Economy ==
=== Real estate ===
The median selling price of homes in the three months ending September 2009, was $334,000.

== Education ==
In addition to Howard University and Banneker High School, the area also has the following schools:

- Harriet Tubman Elementary School
- Park View Elementary School
- Garnett-Patterson Middle School
- Howard University Middle School of Math and Science

== Infrastructure ==
=== Roads ===
U.S. Route 29 is Georgia Avenue, which nearly bisects the area, runs north and south.
