= Zalmon Richards House =

Historic house in Washington, D.C., United States

- U.S. National Register of Historic Places
- U.S. National Historic Landmark
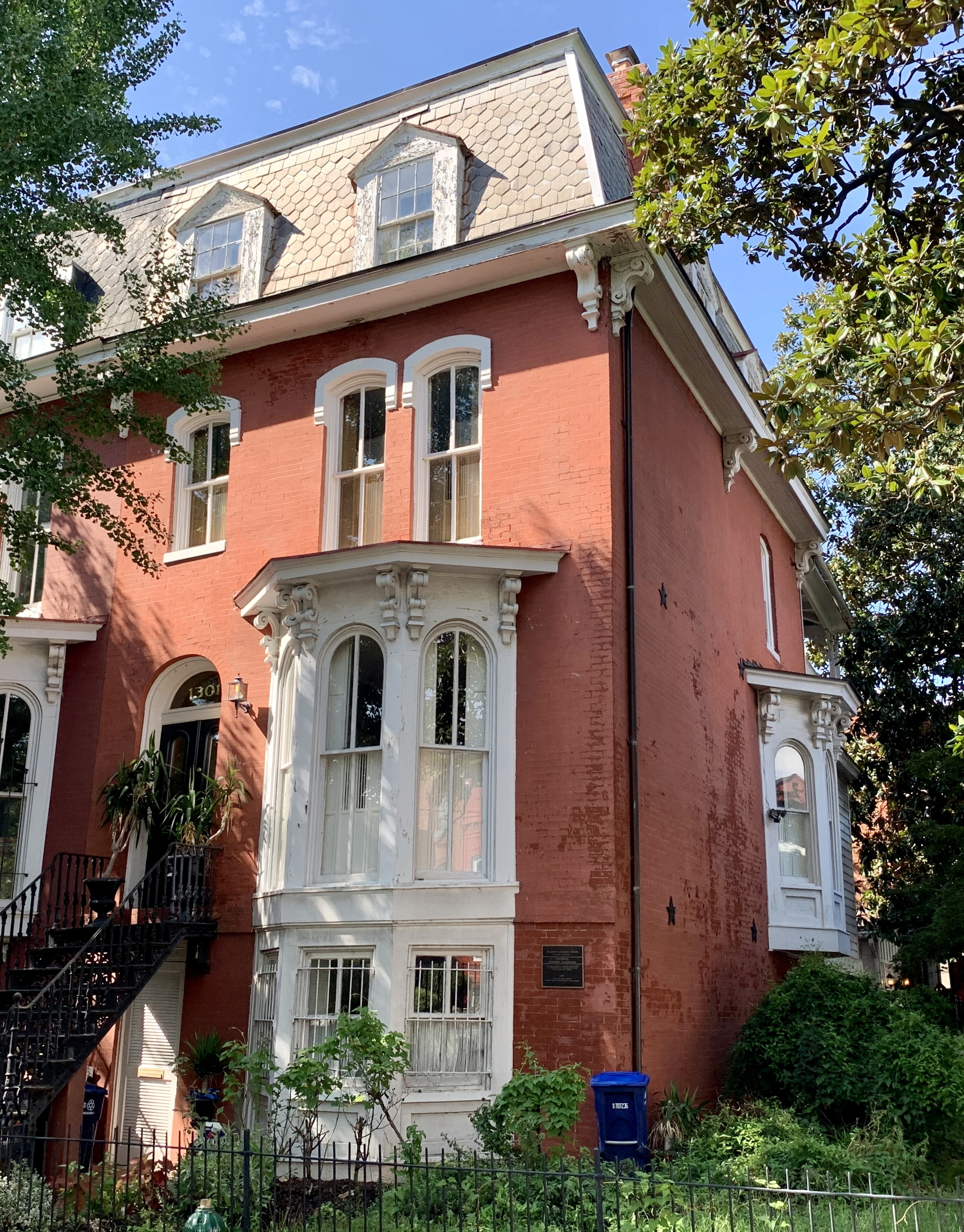

- Location within Central Washington, D.C. Location within the District of Columbia Location within the United States
- Location: 1301 Corcoran St., NW, Washington, D.C.
- Coordinates: 38°54′42″N 77°1′49″W
- Architectural style: Late Victorian
- NRHP reference No.: 66000866

Significant dates
- Added to NRHP: October 15, 1966
- Designated NHL: December 21, 1965

The Zalmon Richards House is a historic house in Washington, D.C. A Second Empire rowhouse, it was home from 1882 until his death of Zalmon Richards (1811–1899), founder of the National Education Association. It was declared a National Historic Landmark in 1965. It is a private residence.

== Description and history ==
The Zalmon Richards House stands in Washington's Logan Circle neighborhood, on the north side of Corcoran Street NW between 13th and 14th Streets. It is at the right end of a series of Victorian brick row houses which line the street. It is 2 1/2 stories in height with a raised basement, and a mansard roof providing a full third floor in the attic level. The main facade is three bays wide, with the entrance recessed under a round-arch opening in the leftmost bay. On the first floor, the right two bays are taken up by a polygonal wood-frame window bay with a bracketed roof. Second-floor windows are set in segmented-arch openings crowned by a decorative hoods with drip moulding. The right wall of the building has a projecting oriel window with styling similar to the front bay. The building's builder and construction date are not known.

The house was purchased in 1882 by Zalmon Richards. He was by then already prominent in education circles, serving as founder and first president of the National Teachers Association, now the National Education Association. Raised and educated in Massachusetts, Richards embarked on a teaching career at the age of seventeen, and organized teachers at virtually every major posting he held. This work culminated in the founding in 1857 of the National Teachers Association. Richards lived in this house from 1882 until his death in 1899, and taught in one of its rooms.

== See also ==
- List of National Historic Landmarks in Washington, D.C.
- National Register of Historic Places listings in the upper NW Quadrant of Washington, D.C.
