= Zalmon Richards =

American educator (1811–1899)

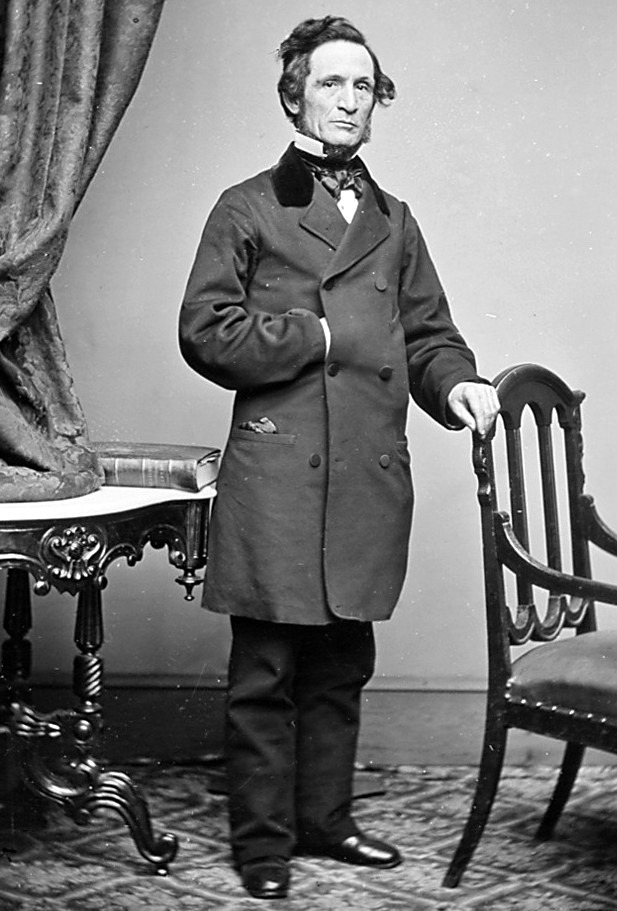
- Photograph by Mathew Brady
- Born: August 11, 1811; Cummington, Massachusetts, US
- Died: November 1, 1899 (aged 88); Washington, D.C., US
- Occupation: Educator
- Known for: First president of the National Education Association
- Spouse: Minerva Todd (died 1873)

Zalmon Richards (August 11, 1811 – November 1, 1899) was an American educator from Washington, D.C. He is best known as one of the founders and the first president of the National Teachers Association, now known as the National Education Association. Richards also played a large role in Congress passing a bill creating the Office of Education, precursor to the Department of Education. His former home in Washington, D.C., was designated a National Historic Landmark in 1965.

== Early life ==
Zalmon was born in 1811 in Cummington, Massachusetts, to Nehemiah and Elizabeth (née Packard) Richards. Regarding his unusual first name, Zalmon signed his name only with a "Z" and had "vials of wrath if one called him 'Zed'." His father was a farmer and descendant of English emigrant William Richards, a Plymouth colonist. Richards became interested in education and religion due to the influence of his first teacher, Sybil Bates. He regularly attended the local school from the ages of three to ten. For the next four years, he was only able to attend school for one semester a year due to him helping his family on their farm. Around this time Richards heard a lecture on temperance and made a vow to never consume alcohol, which according to him, he kept. When he was fifteen, Richards joined a local Baptist church his father had co-founded and regularly attended Baptist churches the rest of his life. He briefly attended Cummington Academy until the age of seventeen. At that point he began teaching at a small school for eight dollars a month plus room and board. While teaching at the school he decided to attend college and pursue a career in education. He attended Southampton Academy and received private tutoring before entering Williams College in 1832. Richards' family was unable to assist paying his tuition, so he continued teaching during college breaks and borrowed money which he later repaid. He graduated from Williams in 1836 and later earned his Master of Arts.

== Career ==
After graduation, Richards returned to his alma mater, Cummington Academy, but this time as principal. He held this position for the next three years, during which time he married his assistant teacher, Minerva Todd. In September 1839, Richards became head of the Stillwater Academy in Stillwater, New York. During his nine years at this academy, Richards also organized normal schools in Saratoga County, New York, and at the request of Governor Horace Eaton, in Vermont. These training grounds for educators was considered innovative at the time. He and his wife moved to Washington, D.C. in 1848 where he became principal of the preparatory department of Columbian College (present-day George Washington University), a position he held for three years. In 1852, Richards founded a private school, Union Academy, which was successful until Southern students left at the outbreak of the Civil War. The school was located on the northwest corner of 14th Street and New York Avenue NW. He helped organize the Young Men's Christian Association (YMCA) of Washington in 1852. It was the third association of its type in the United States and Richards was its first president. He remained president for two years and continued having an active role with the organization for the remainder of his life.

Richards was one of thirty-eight delegates who met at the Athenaeum of Philadelphia in 1857 and founded the National Teachers Association (NTA), renamed the National Education Association (NEA) in 1870. He was elected the NTA's first president and presided over the organization's first annual meeting in 1858. He played an active role in the NTA/NEA the rest of his life and attended annual meetings until 1896. In reference to the NEA, Richards said: "There is not a state, county, city or town in all our country where the influence of our associational work is not more or less felt."

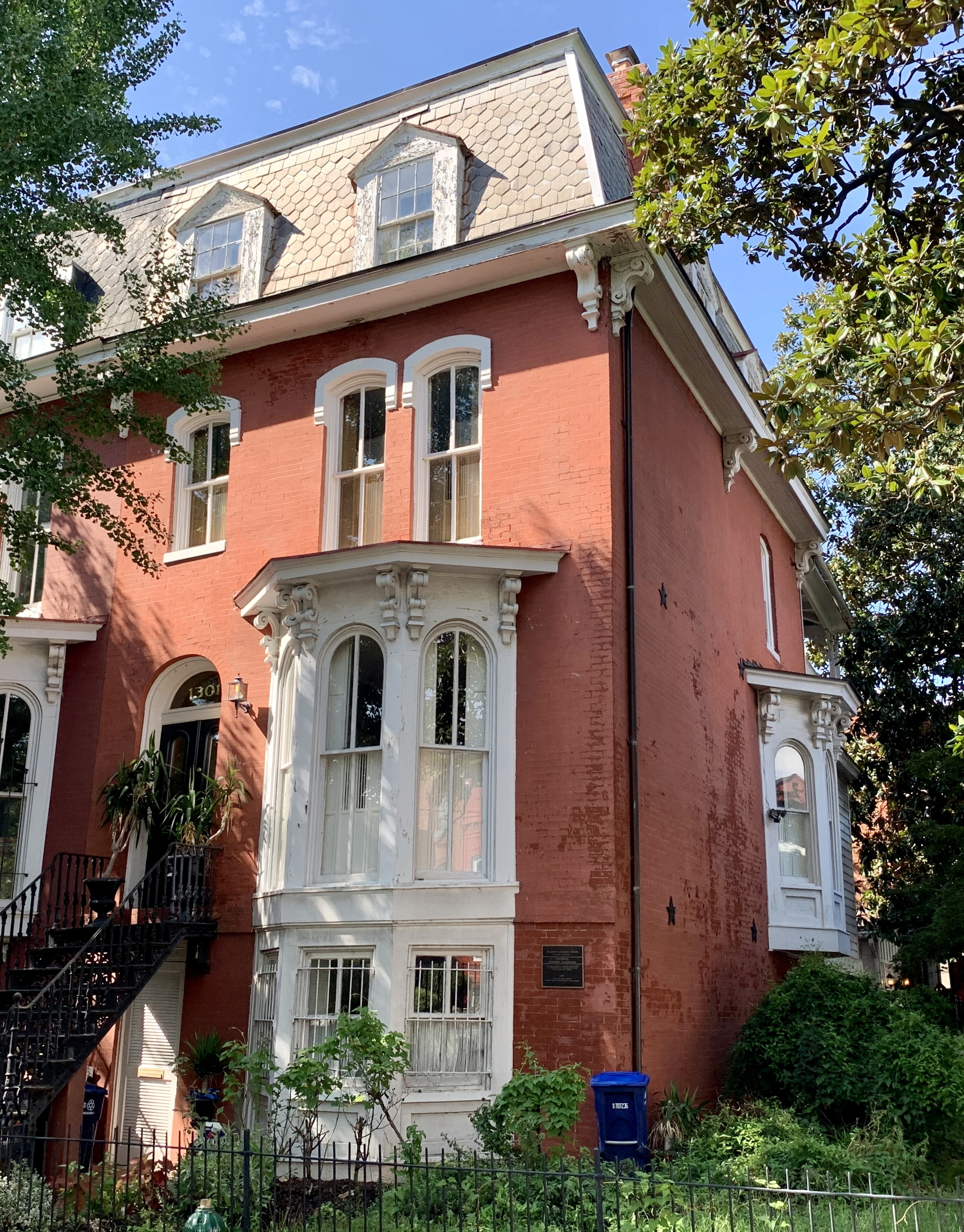
The Zalmon Richards House is a National Historic Landmark.

During the Civil War, Richards was involved with the Christian Commission, visiting sick and wounded soldiers in local hospitals. He was elected to the Common Council (precursor to the Council of the District of Columbia), representing the Second Ward, while his brother Almarin represented Ward Three. In 1861, he was appointed to work in the Treasury Department as a clerk. Richards was later transferred to the Bureau of Statistics and worked there until 1867. That same year he was once again elected to the Common Council and became its president. During his time on the Council he returned to his work with education by managing a normal school for Washington, D.C. public school teachers and by being largely responsible for Congress establishing the Office of Education in 1867. Richards worked at the new agency until it became a bureau of the Interior Department in 1869. He helped pass a Council ordinance which created the Office of Superintendent of Public Schools and served as the first superintendent of Washington, D.C.'s public schools for one year. In 1871, Richards was appointed auditor for the government of the District of Columbia and served that position until 1874.

== Later years ==
Richards' wife, Minerva, died on July 15, 1873. The following August he married his second wife, Mary Frances Mather, a direct descendant of Puritan minister Cotton Mather. In 1880, Richards published Teachers' Manual for primary school instructors, and in 1885, he published The Natural Arithmetic. Richards and Mary moved to 1301 Corcoran Street NW in 1882. Richards lost most of his property when loans he had co-signed for close friends defaulted. He supported himself during his last years by teaching a small private school in his home. Mary died in 1896 and Richards died three years later on November 1, 1899. He was buried in Oak Hill Cemetery in a family plot, next to his two wives.

Richards' former Second Empire residence on Corcoran Street, the Zalmon Richards House, was designated a National Historic Landmark on December 21, 1965. The home is also designated a contributing property to the Greater Fourteenth Street Historic District, listed on the National Register of Historic Places in 1994.

== Bibliography ==
- Teachers' Manual, A.S. Barnes & Company, New York, 1880, OCLC 33867531
- The Natural Arithmetic, S.R. Winchell & Co., Chicago, 1885, OCLC 5634600
