= Chapman Coal Company Garage and Stable =

- U.S. National Register of Historic Places
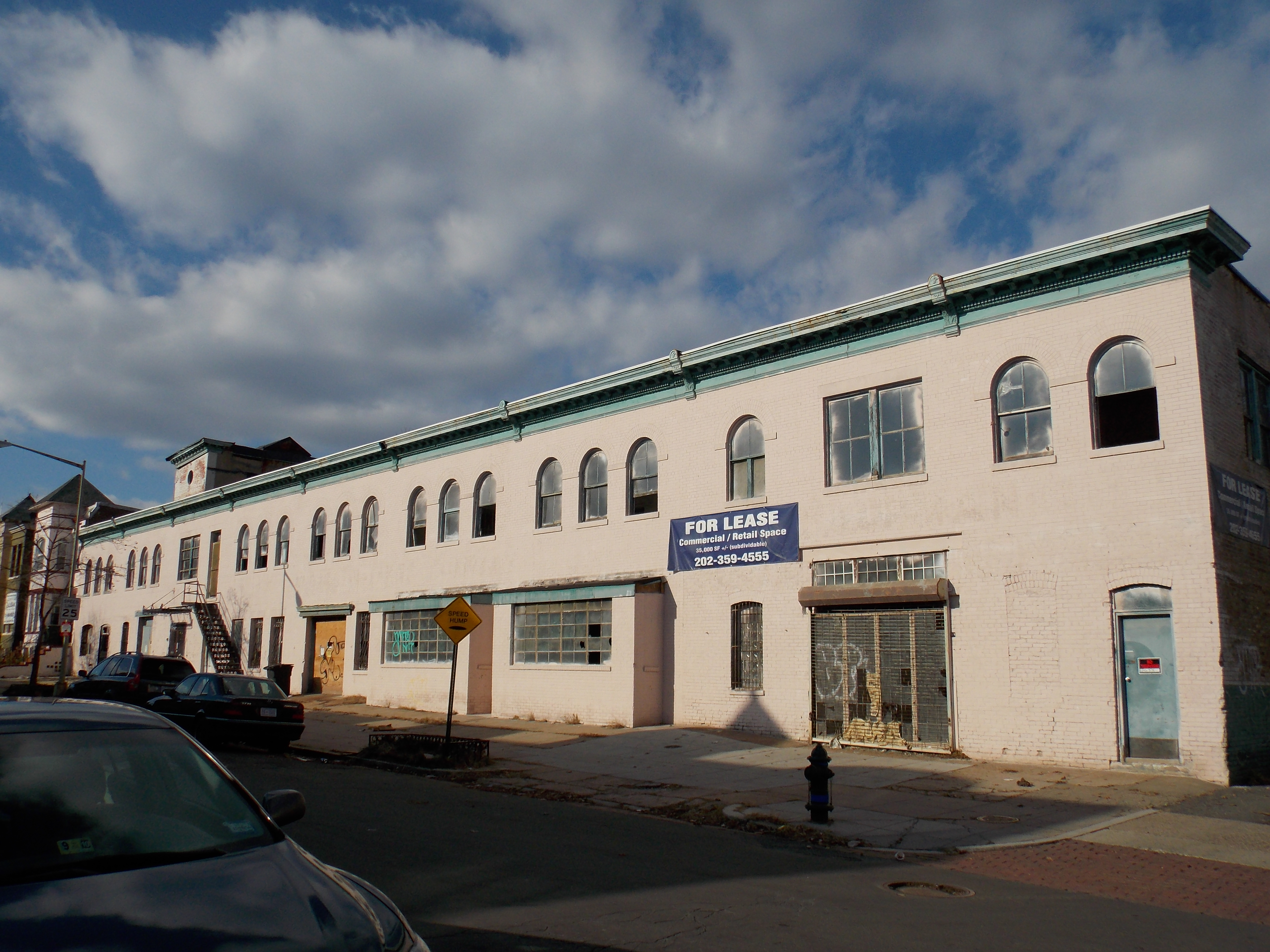
- Chapman Coal Company Garage and Stable in December, 2013

- Location within Washington, D.C.
- Location: 57 N St., NW; Washington, D.C.
- Coordinates: 38°54′26.99″N 77°00′40.01″W
- NRHP reference No.: 13000845
- Added to NRHP: October 23, 2013

Chapman Coal Company Garage and Stable is a historic site in the District of Columbia. It is located at 57 N Street NW in Washington. It was listed on the National Register of Historic Places on October 23, 2013.

The site was redeveloped in 2016–2018 into a 114-unit mixed-use condominium complex named Chapman Stables. The developer, Four Points LLC, converted the original building into 36 condominiums, and built a new five-story adjacent building with an additional 78 units.
