= Alden, Babcock and Calvert Apartments =

- Alden, Babcock, Calvert Apartments
- U.S. National Register of Historic Places
- D.C. Inventory of Historic Sites
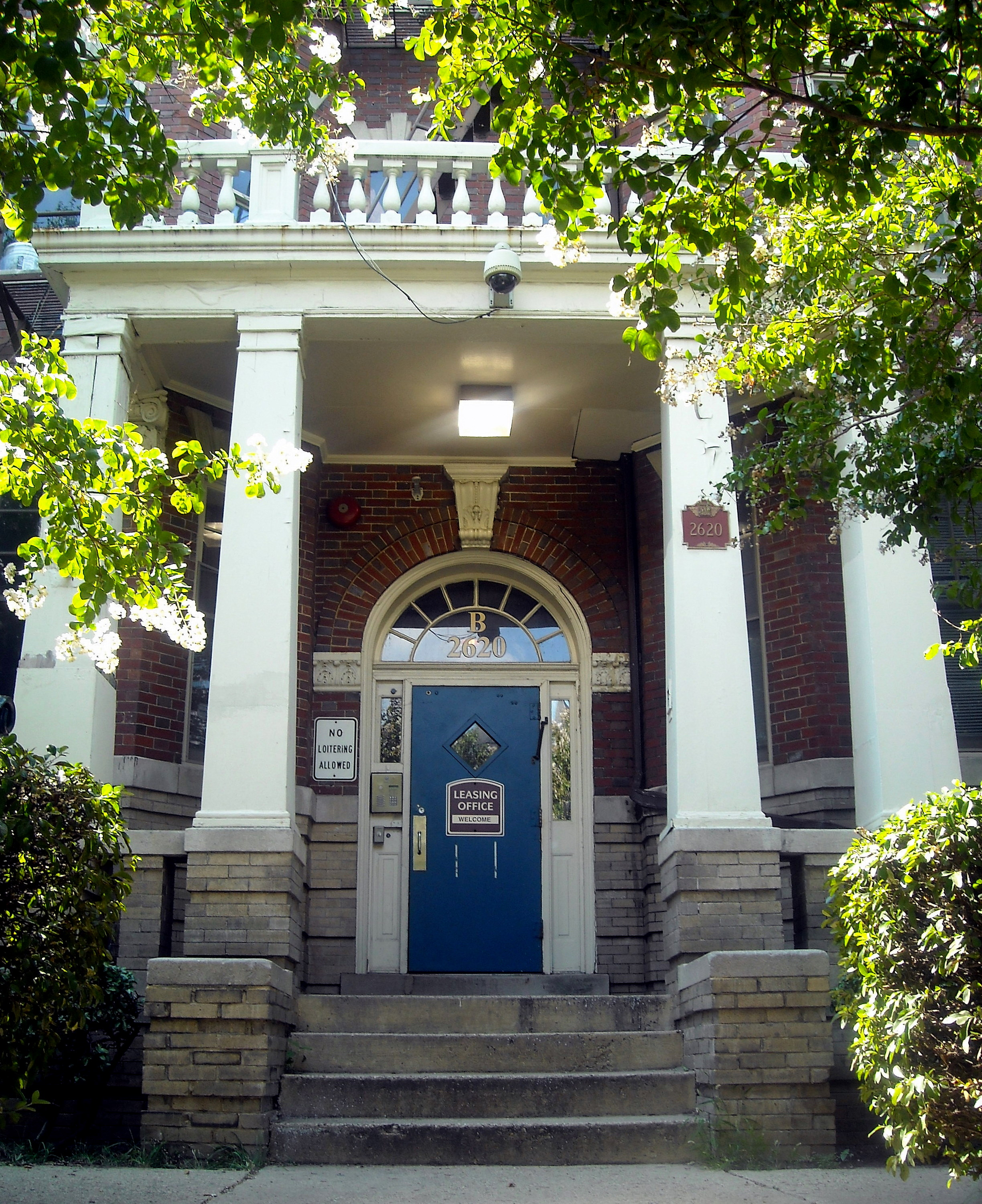
- Babcock Apartment building at 2620-B 13th St., NW

- Location within Washington, D.C.
- Location: 2620 13th St., NW., Washington, D.C.
- Coordinates: 38°55′27″N 77°1′49″W
- Area: 0.1 acres (0.040 ha)
- Built: 1904
- Architect: Kennedy & Davis (Edgar S. Kennedy and Isaac N Davis)
- Architectural style: Colonial Revival
- NRHP reference No.: 90000737

Significant dates
- Added to NRHP: May 25, 1990
- Designated DCIHS: January 24, 1990

The Alden, Babcock and Calvert Apartments, also known as the Warner Apartments, are three adjoining historic apartment buildings located at 2620-A, 2520-B and 2620-C, respectively, on 13th St., NW, in the Columbia Heights neighborhood of Washington, D.C. They were designed and built in 1904 by Edgar S. Kennedy and Isaac N Davis of Kennedy and Davis in the redbrick Colonial Revival-style of architecture.

On May 25, 1990, they were added to the National Register of Historic Places.
