= The Plymouth =

- U.S. National Register of Historic Places
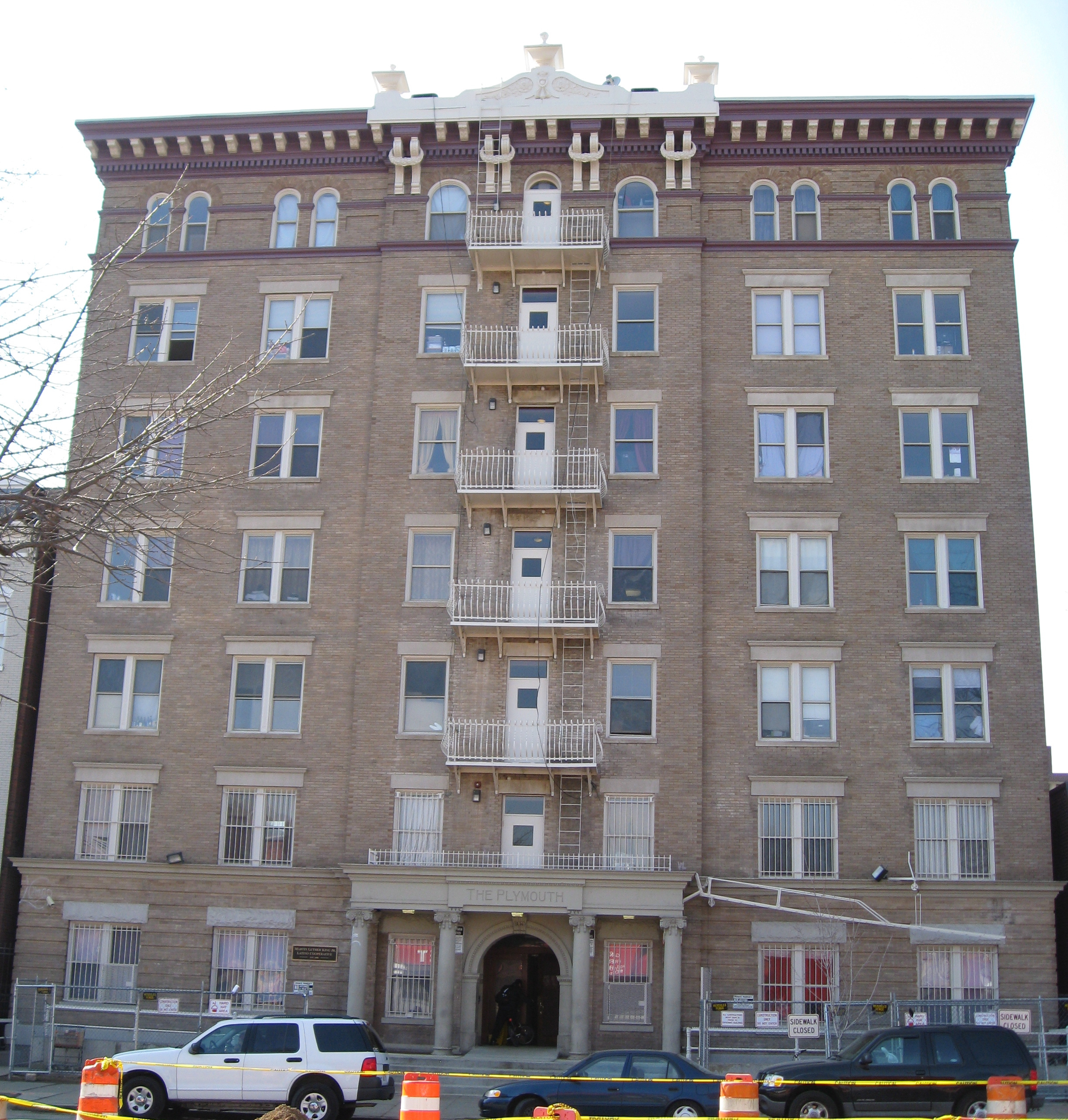

- Location within Washington, D.C.
- Location: 1236 Eleventh St. NW; Washington, D.C.
- Coordinates: 38°54′23″N 77°1′39″W
- Built: 1903
- Architect: Frederick Atkinson
- Architectural style: Classical Revival
- MPS: Apartment Buildings in Washington, DC, MPS
- NRHP reference No.: 86001242
- Added to NRHP: June 2, 1986

The Plymouth is a historic building in Washington, D.C., United States. It is in the Logan Circle-Shaw neighborhood in the Northwest Quadrant of the city. Frederick Atkinson designed the building in the Classical Revival style and it was completed in 1903. It was listed on the National Register of Historic Places in 1986.
