= Washington Heights Historic District =

Historic district in Washington, D.C., United States

- U.S. National Register of Historic Places
- U.S. Historic district
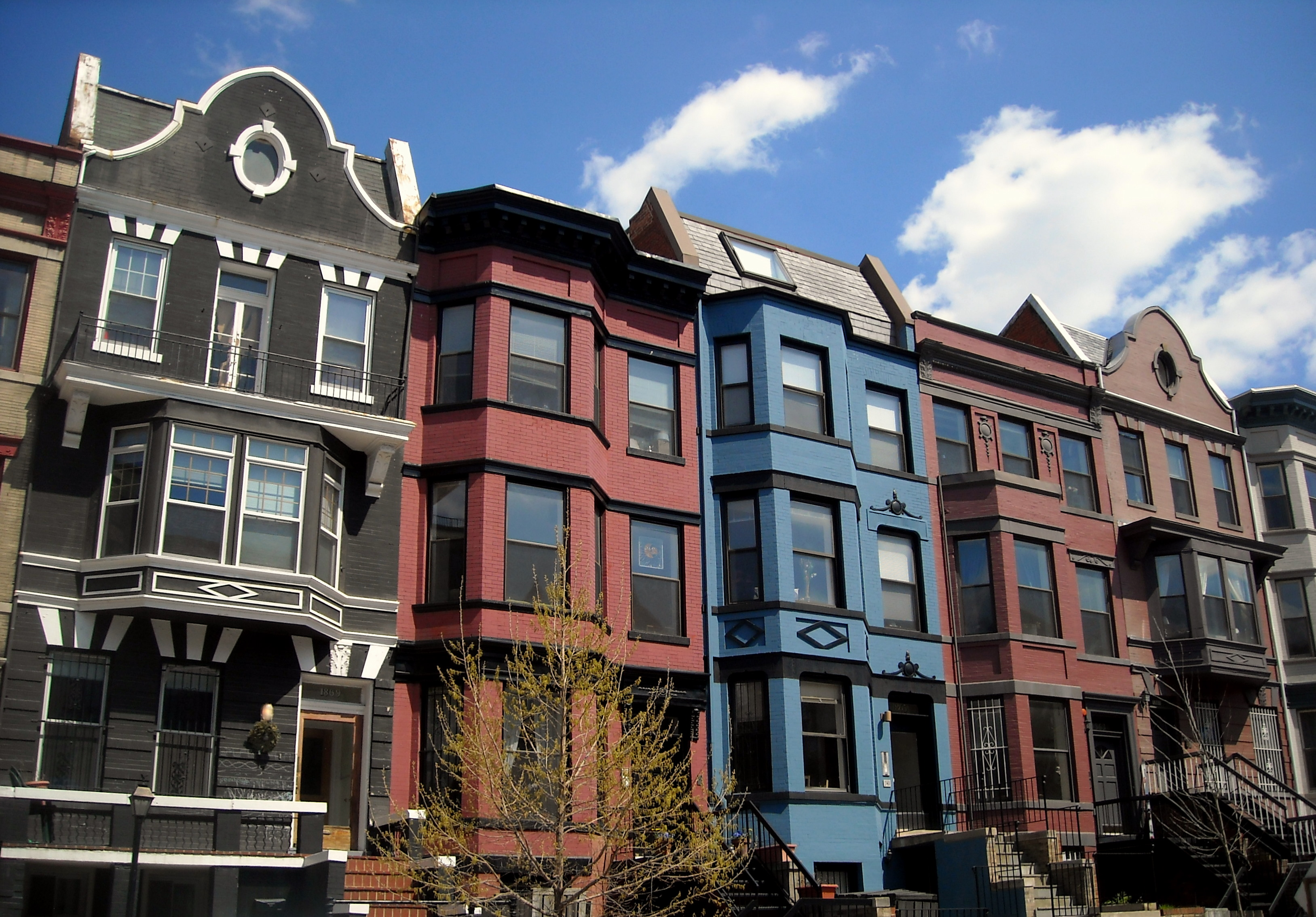

- Location within the District of Columbia Location within the United States
- Location: Bounded by Columbia Rd., NW, 19th St. NW, 18th St. NW and Florida Ave. NW; Washington, D.C.
- Coordinates: 38°55′07.5″N 77°2′35″W
- Architect: Speiden & Speiden, et al.
- Architectural style: Late 19th and early 20th Century Revivals
- NRHP reference No.: 06000875
- Added to NRHP: September 27, 2006

The Washington Heights Historic District is located in the Adams Morgan neighborhood of Washington, D.C. The historic district includes 347 contributing properties that date from 1891-1950. It was listed on the National Register of Historic Places in 2006.

== History ==
The area was platted in 1888 and building construction began in 1891. It became a streetcar suburb along Washington's original city limits. The first streetcar was a horse-drawn line that terminated at Connecticut and Florida Avenues. The area's growth intensified when electric streetcars were built on 18th Street in 1892 and Columbia Road in 1896.

Washington Heights was primarily a white middle-class neighborhood until the early 1920s when immigrants from Europe and Asia began to move into the neighborhood. Many of the newcomers operated small businesses along 18th Street or worked in the embassies in the area. The African American population was originally limited to the servants and janitors who lived where they were employed. They started moving into their own residences in the area in the 1930s, especially along Vernon Street. Single family row houses were transformed into rooming houses. Racial attitudes regarding the changing demographics led to white flight for the suburbs in the 1950s and 1960s, which also depressed property values. At that time Spanish speaking residents began to move into the area because of its affordable housing and because of its proximity to the Latin American embassies. As turmoil gripped the Latin American countries in the 1960s their numbers began to swell in the neighborhood. The 1970s saw people from the Caribbean, Southeast Asia and Africa move into the neighborhood, which has made the neighborhood a multicultural and multinational mix of people.

== Architecture ==
The architecture of the historic district is made up of late 19th century row houses that line the grid pattern streets and early 20th century apartment blocks that front the avenues. A variety of commercial structures are found along 18th Street NW.

== Contributing Properties ==
- Wyoming Apartments
