= Wyoming Apartments =

- U.S. National Register of Historic Places
- U.S. Historic district – Contributing property
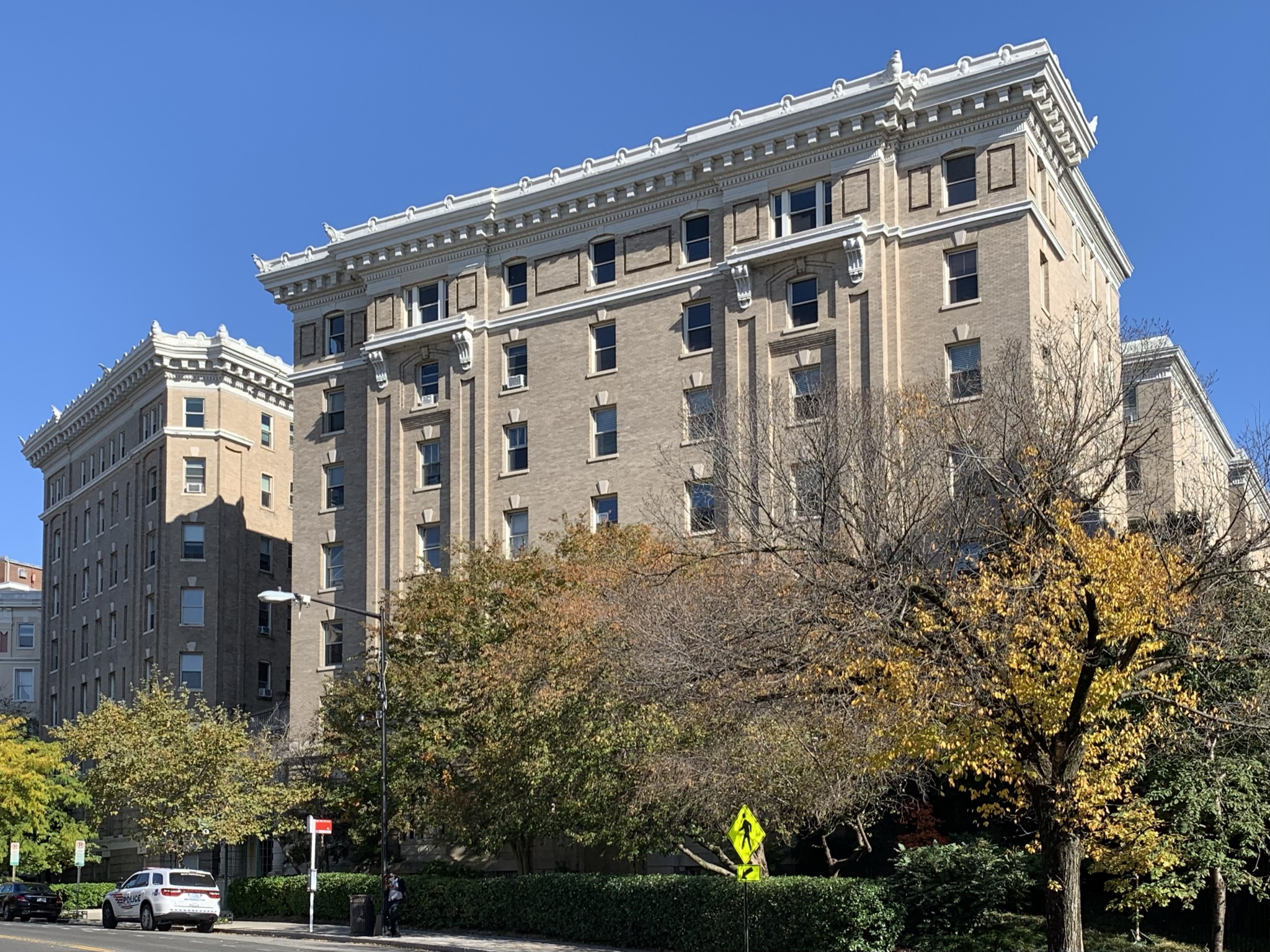
- Wyoming Apartments in 2020

- Location within Washington, D.C.
- Location: 2022 Columbia Road NW, N.W. Washington, D.C., U.S.
- Coordinates: 38°55′2″N 77°2′45″W
- Built: 1905; 121 years ago
- Architectural style: Beaux Arts
- Part of: Washington Heights Historic District (ID06000875)
- NRHP reference No.: 83001414

Significant dates
- Added to NRHP: September 27, 1983
- Designated CP: September 27, 2006

Wyoming Apartments is a historic apartment building, located at 2022 Columbia Road, Northwest, Washington, D.C. in the Kalorama neighborhood.

== History ==
The Beaux-Arts luxury apartment building was designed by B. Stanley Simmons, for Lester A. Barr. The building has two wings: The first was built in 1905, and the second wing was constructed in 1911. In 1982, Barr's grandson sold the building for $6.3 million to developers, who converted it to condominiums.

The building is composed of 106 apartments, 76 in the South Wing and 30 in the North Wing.

Featured in book, The Lost Child of Philomena Lee, as the weekday residence of her son, who worked for the Republican National Committee, and his partner.

The Wyoming is listed on the National Register of Historic Places, and is a contributing property to the Washington Heights Historic District.

== Notable residents ==
=== Former ===
- Frank Mankiewicz
- Betty Friedan
- Christopher Hitchens
- Dwight D. Eisenhower
- George Stephanopoulos

== See also ==
- National Register of Historic Places listings in Washington, D.C.
