= Alma Thomas House =

Historic house in Washington, D.C., United States

- U.S. National Register of Historic Places
- U.S. Historic district – Contributing property
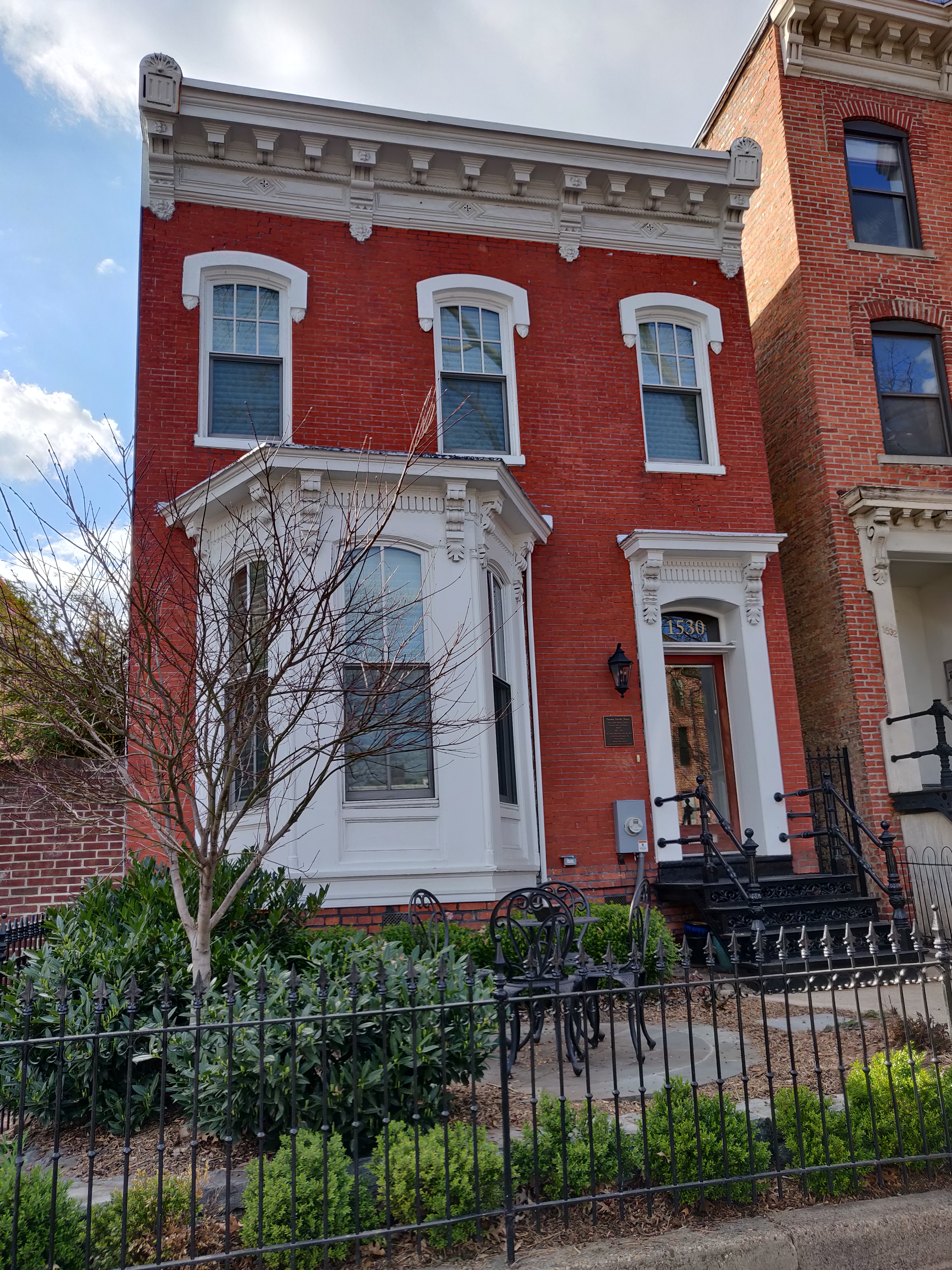

- Location within the District of Columbia
- Location: 1530 15th Street, Northwest, Washington, D.C.
- Coordinates: 38°54′38.51″N 77°2′4.37″W
- Built: 1875
- Architectural style: Italianate
- Part of: Greater Fourteenth Street Historic District (ID94000992)
- NRHP reference No.: 86002923
- Added to NRHP: July 28, 1987

The Alma Thomas House is an historic house, located at 1530 15th Street, N.W., in the Logan Circle neighborhood.

== History ==
Built in 1875, by Thomas G. Allen, the Italianate row house was the residence and studio of noted African-American artist Alma Thomas (1892–1978).

The owner of the House is Miss J. Maurice Thomas and the Preservation approach is private and is not accessible to the public.

Rosa Douglass Sprague, daughter to Frederick Douglass, lived at 1530 15th Street, before Alma Thomas's parents moved in, in 1907.

This house was successfully nominated for the National Register for Historic Places and was officially listed on July 28, 1987.

Noted African American artist Alma Thomas lived in the home until her death in 1978 along with a sister, J. Maurice Thomas. John Maurice Thomas, who was named for their father, lived at the home until her death in 2004, and the home passed to a nephew, who later sold the home.

Alma Thomas was an important African American artist who gained recognition during a time when Black women faced limited opportunities in the art world.

In 2016 about 40 years after Alma Thomas passing, One of her abstract paintings from 1966 titled Resurrection became the first painting by a black women to have been hanged in the White House.

The building is listed on the National Register of Historic Places, and is a contributing property to the Greater Fourteenth Street Historic District.

After graduating from Howard University in 1924, Alma Thomas continued her educations and was the first African American to graduate in fine arts. During that time she also taught at Shaw Junior High School.

On June 19, 1987 Alma Thomas house nomination form was approved by the National Register Of Historic Places in Washington D.C.

== See also ==
- National Register of Historic Places listings in the District of Columbia
