= Benjamin Banneker Academic High School =

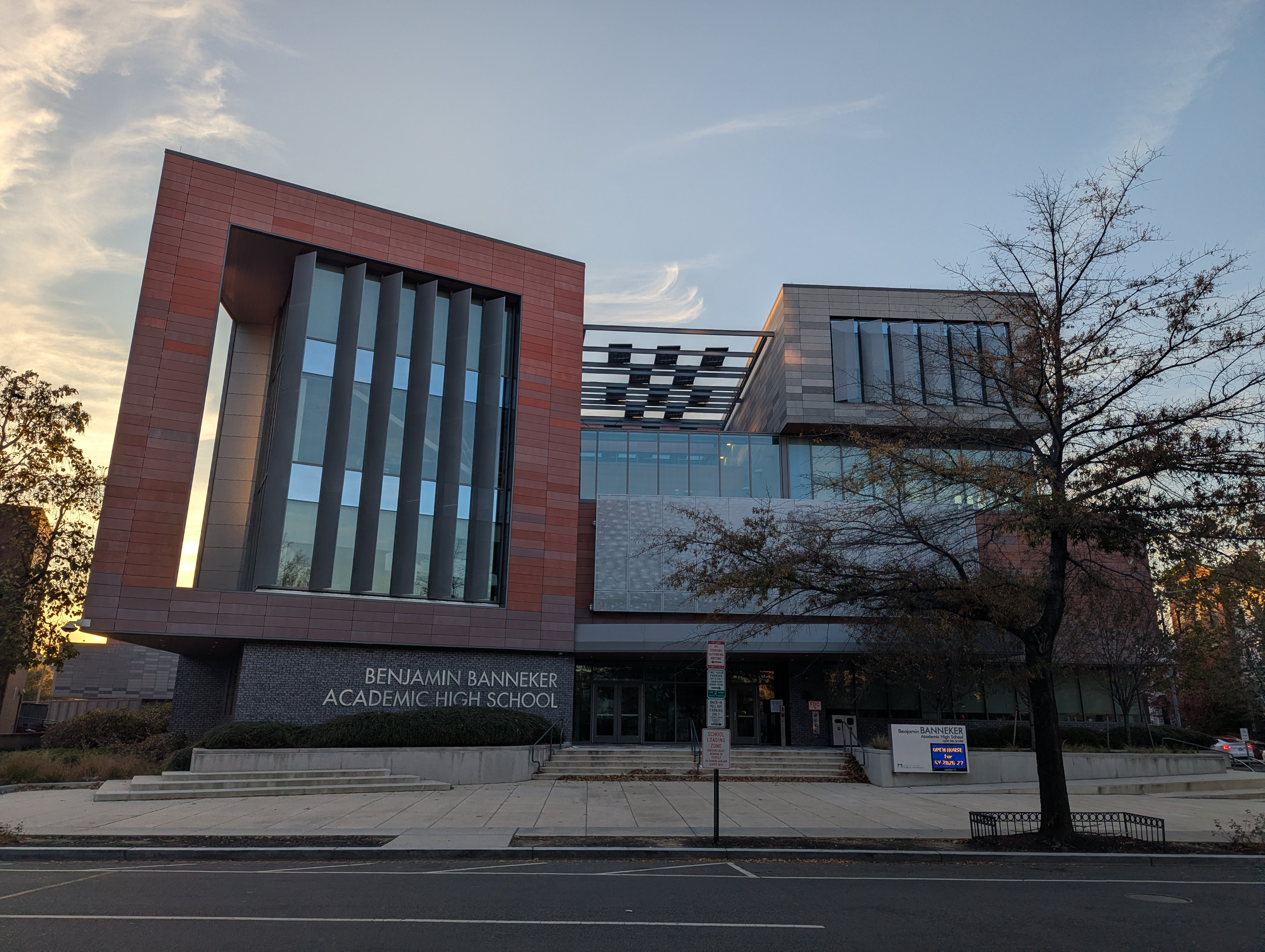
- Entrance to the 2021 building

Location
- 1600 9th St NW; Washington, DC 20001; United States; 38°54′44″N 77°1′27″W

Information
- School type: Public high school
- Motto: "Embrace the spirit of teaching and learning"
- Established: 1981 (45 years ago)
- School district: District of Columbia Public Schools Ward 1
- CEEB code: 090017
- Principal: Anita M. Berger
- Faculty: 34.0 (on FTE basis)
- Grades: 9 to 12
- Enrollment: 454 (2015-16)
- Student to teacher ratio: 11.56
- Campus type: Urban
- Colors: Red, white, blue
- Mascot: Bulldog
- Website: www.benjaminbanneker.org

Benjamin Banneker Academic High School (BBAHS) is a magnet high school located in Washington, D.C., that was originally built to serve as a neighborhood Junior High School. The school's name commemorates Benjamin Banneker, an African-American scientist, surveyor, almanac author and farmer. In 1980, the school was converted to a magnet high school for academics. The school is colloquially referred to by students and faculty as "Banneker".

Banneker was formerly located across the street from Howard University, but in 2021 a new campus opened at former Shaw Middle School site in Shaw. The former Banneker building will then become the site of Shaw Middle School following renovations. The school draws students from all parts of the city. Any student interested in applying must follow an entrance procedure, involving a multiple choice test, a written essay, an interview, recommendation(s), and a report of the applicant's standardized test scores and grades from previous years.

The school's enrollment as of the 2023-2024 school year is 671 students spanning from grades 9 through 12. Benjamin Banneker Academic High School is an IB Diploma Programme world school.

== History ==
Banneker was formerly located across the street from Howard University, but in 2021 a new campus opened at former Shaw Middle School site in Shaw.

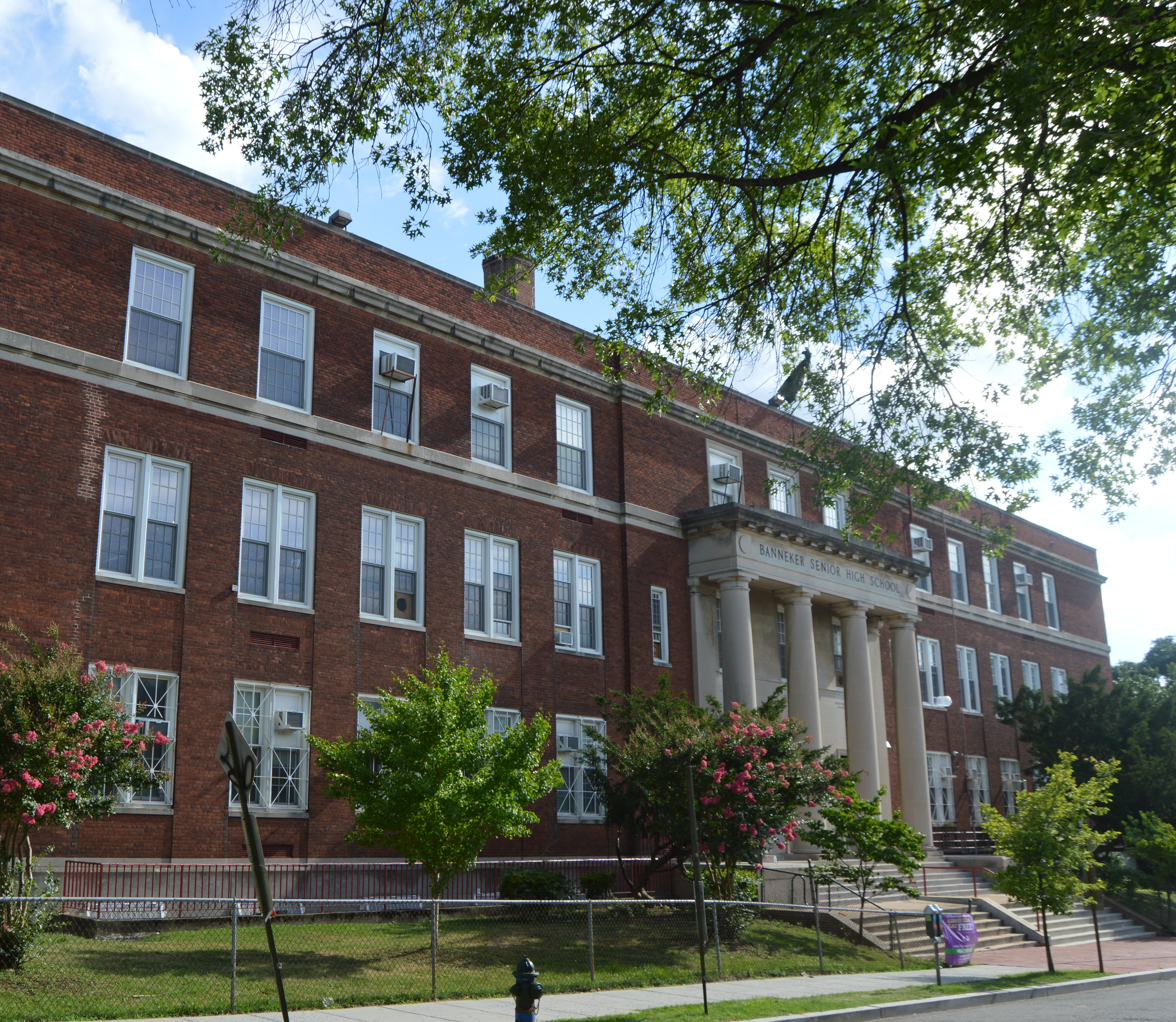
The former building

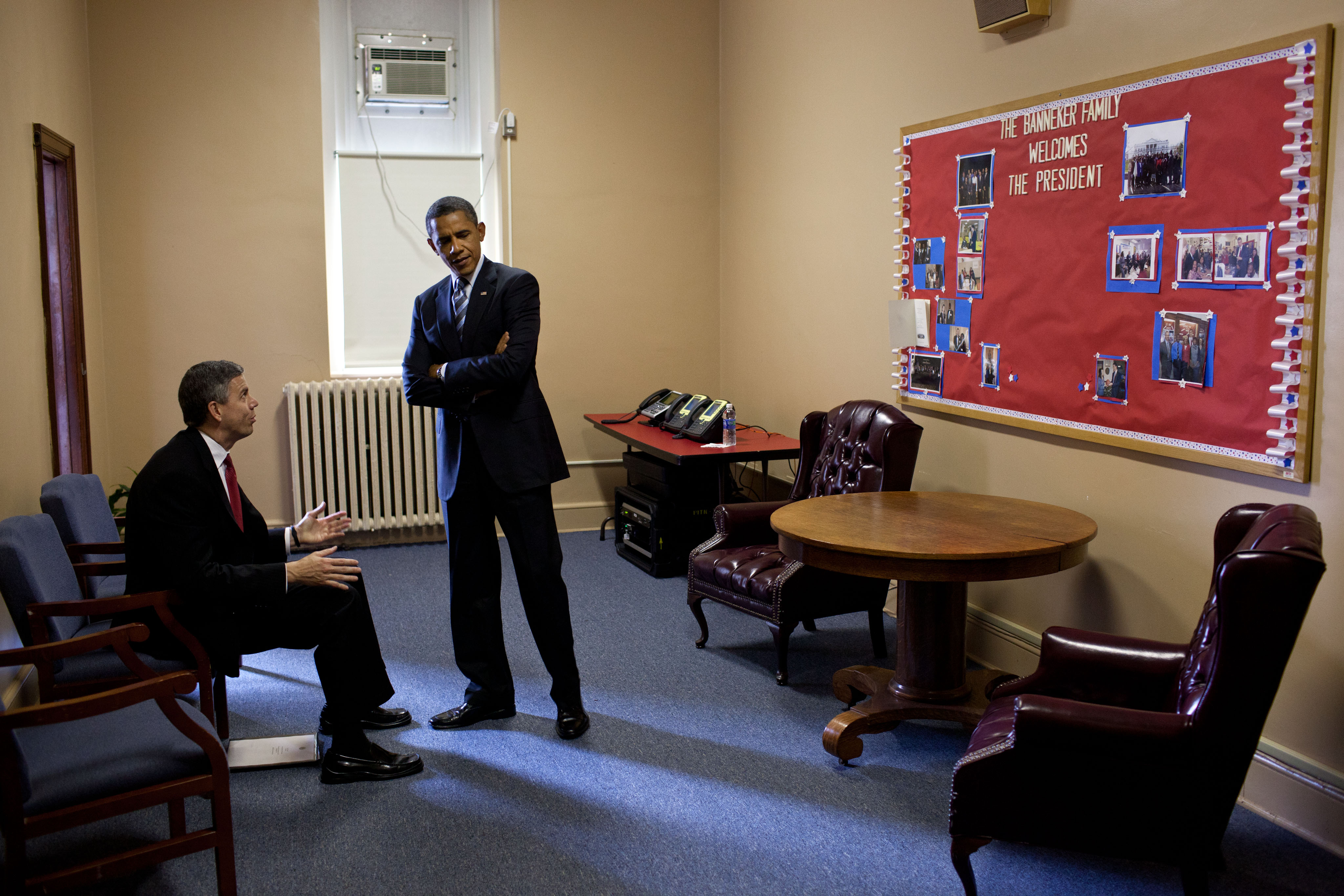
Arne Duncan (left) and Barack Obama at Benjamin Banneker Academic High School, 2011

The school hosted President Barack Obama for the yearly "Back To School" speech in September 2011 and October 2016.

== Extracurricular activities ==
=== Athletics ===
The school offers boys and girls basketball, volleyball, softball, tennis, track & field, cross country, soccer, and boys basketball and soccer.

=== Robotics ===
The robotics club has participated in the Lemelson-MIT InvenTeams competition, twice winning a grant for their inventions: "Cell-Mate" (a cell-phone locker, 2006) and "DeadStop" (a door-hinge locker to prevent classroom access to terrorists, 2013). These successful inventions have showcased at other events, and the students applied for patents for their work.

=== NASA OPSPARC competition ===
In the 2018 OPSPARC competition for students to invent a new use for NASA technology, Mikayla Sharrieff, India Skinner and Bria Snell, three black Banneker juniors, won second place with equipment to remove lead from school water fountains. The public voting component of the final was cut short after members of 4chan disrupted voting by both discouraging voting for the girls on racial grounds and hacking.
