= General Oliver Otis Howard House =

Historic house in Washington, D.C., United States

- U.S. National Register of Historic Places
- U.S. National Historic Landmark
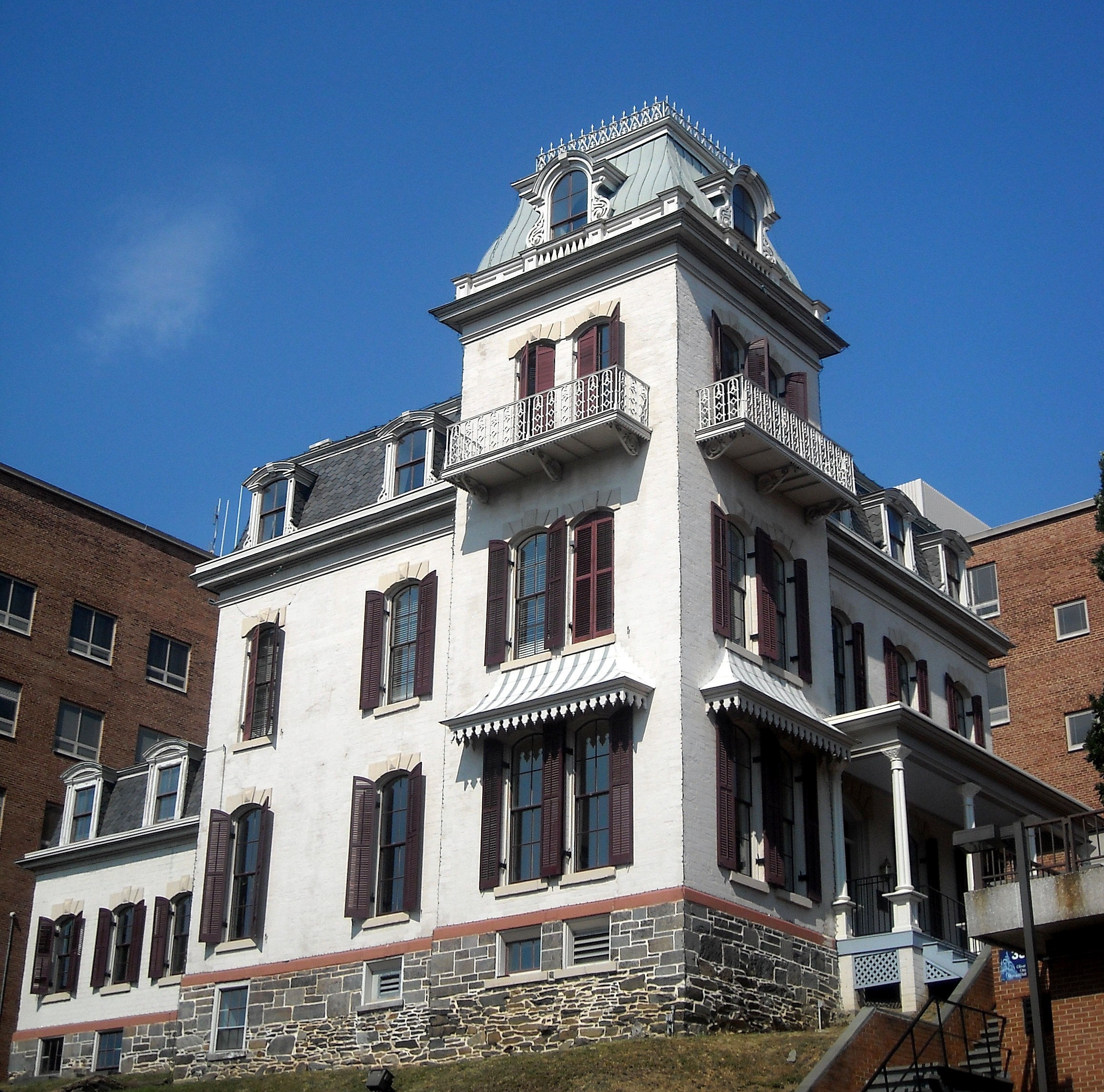

- Location within Washington, D.C.
- Location: 607 Howard Pl., NW (campus of Howard University), Washington, D.C.
- Coordinates: 38°55′23″N 77°01′19″W
- Area: less than one acre
- Built: 1867
- Architectural style: Second Empire
- NRHP reference No.: 74002163

Significant dates
- Added to NRHP: February 12, 1974
- Designated NHL: May 30, 1974

The General Oliver Otis Howard House, also known as Howard Hall, is a historic house, and the oldest surviving building on the campus of Howard University, in Washington, D.C. Built in 1867, it was the home of General Oliver Otis Howard, the university founder and its third president. The house was declared a National Historic Landmark in 1974. It faces Georgia Avenue NW, just north of Howard Place.

== Description and history ==
The General Oliver Otis Howard House is located on the west side of the Howard University Campus. It is separated from Georgia Avenue to the west by a parking lot, and from 6th Street by the Johnson Administration Building, which forms an L around its north side. It is a 2 1/2-story painted brick building, with a mansard roof providing a full third floor, and a fieldstone foundation that is exposed on the west and south due to the sloping terrain. A three-story tower projects from the southwest corner, rising to a low balustrade surrounding a mansard roof, which is crowned by iron cresting. Windows are set in segmented-arch windows, and dormers in the roof face have elaborate carved surrounds. The interior retains some original features, but has in parts been altered to provide modern office space.

The house was built in 1867 as the home of General Oliver Otis Howard. Of four buildings erected during the founding phase of Howard University, it is the only one still standing. The university was chartered in 1867, when General Howard was serving as commissioner of the federal Freedmen's Bureau. In that role, Howard was a major supporter of improved educational opportunities for newly freed African Americans. As a member of the First Congregational Church of Washington, he was instrumental in that congregation's support for creating of the institution as a seminary and normal school.

Beyond its architectural significance, the General Oliver Otis Howard House represents a tangible link to the Reconstruction-era mission of expanding educational access for formerly enslaved African Americans. As the residence of General Oliver Otis Howard during his leadership of the Freedmen’s Bureau and early involvement with Howard University, the house functioned as both a domestic and symbolic center of federal efforts to promote Black education and civil rights. Following Howard’s death, the university repurposed the building for institutional use, and it remains a key ceremonial and administrative space, reflecting the continuity of the university’s founding vision.

Howard's house was purchased by the university in 1909.

The Howard House at Howard University transitioned from a private residence into an institutional space in the early twentieth century. After the university acquired the property in 1909, the building was repurposed for administrative and office functions, reflecting the university’s expanding bureaucratic structure. Over time, its role evolved further into a ceremonial and symbolic site used for official university events and functions, illustrating how a once-private domestic space became integrated into the institutional and cultural identity of the university rather than preserved solely as a historic museum (National Park Service, n.d.).

After Howard University acquired the Howard House in 1909, the building was repurposed for administrative and office use as the institution expanded. Over time, it also came to serve ceremonial and representational functions for the university, reflecting its evolving role beyond its original use as a private residence.

== See also ==
- List of National Historic Landmarks in Washington, D.C.
- National Register of Historic Places listings in the upper NW Quadrant of Washington, D.C.
