= George M. Barker Company Warehouse =

- U.S. National Register of Historic Places
- D.C. Inventory of Historic Sites
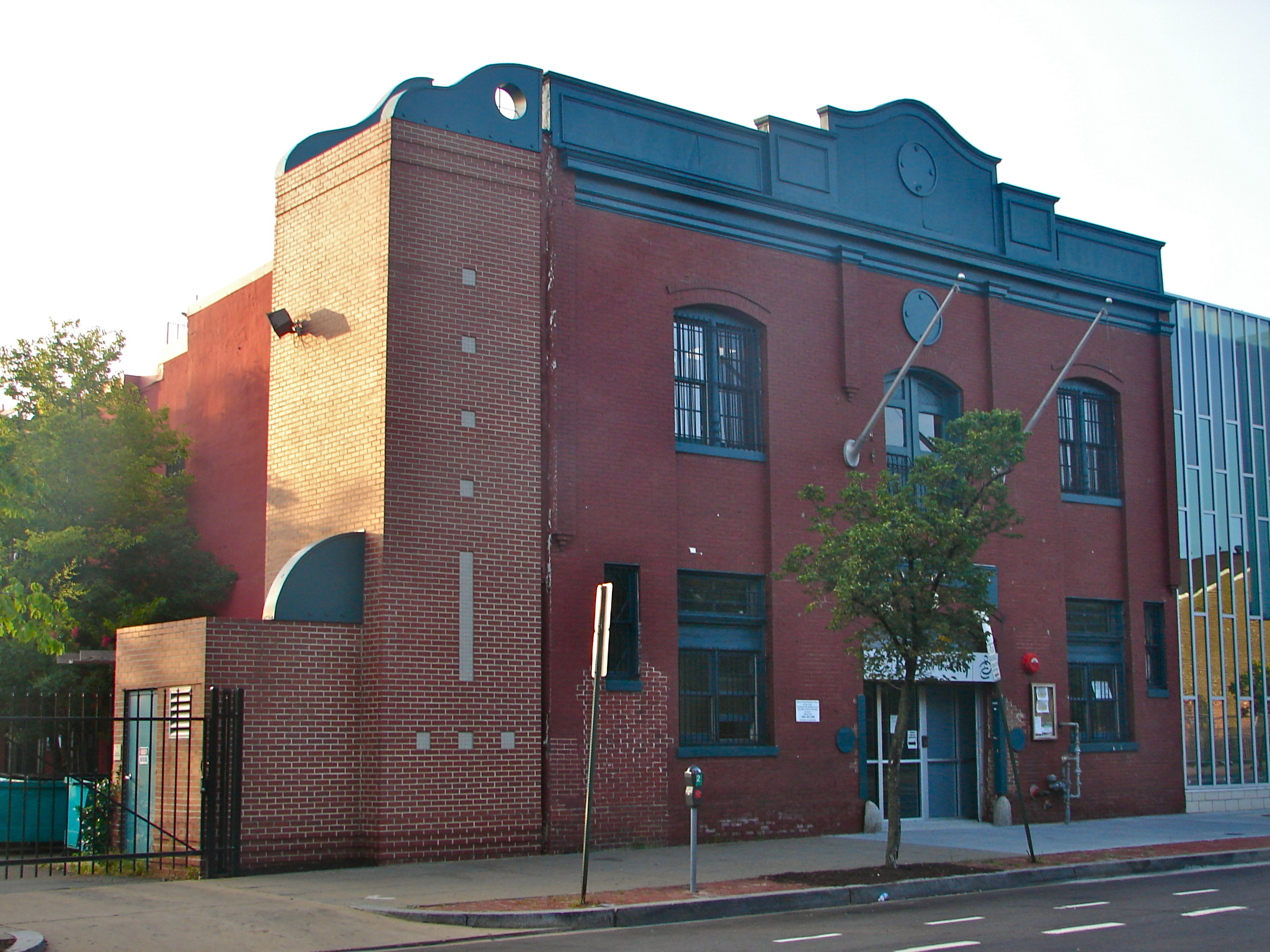

- Location within Washington, D.C.
- Location: 1525 7th St., N.W., Washington, D.C.
- Coordinates: 38°54′36″N 77°1′17″W
- Built: 1906
- Architect: A.M. Poynton
- NRHP reference No.: 08000820

Significant dates
- Added to NRHP: August 27, 2008
- Designated DCIHS: May 22, 2008

The George M. Barker Company Warehouse is an historic building located at 1525 7th Street, Northwest, Washington, D.C., in the Logan Circle-Shaw neighborhood.

== History ==
It was designed by A.M. Poynton and constructed in 1906 as a lumber, coal and wood distribution warehouse.

It is now used by Bread for the City, a local social service organization, and above the door is written "Dignity, Respect, Service."
