= Seventh Street Savings Bank =

- U.S. National Register of Historic Places
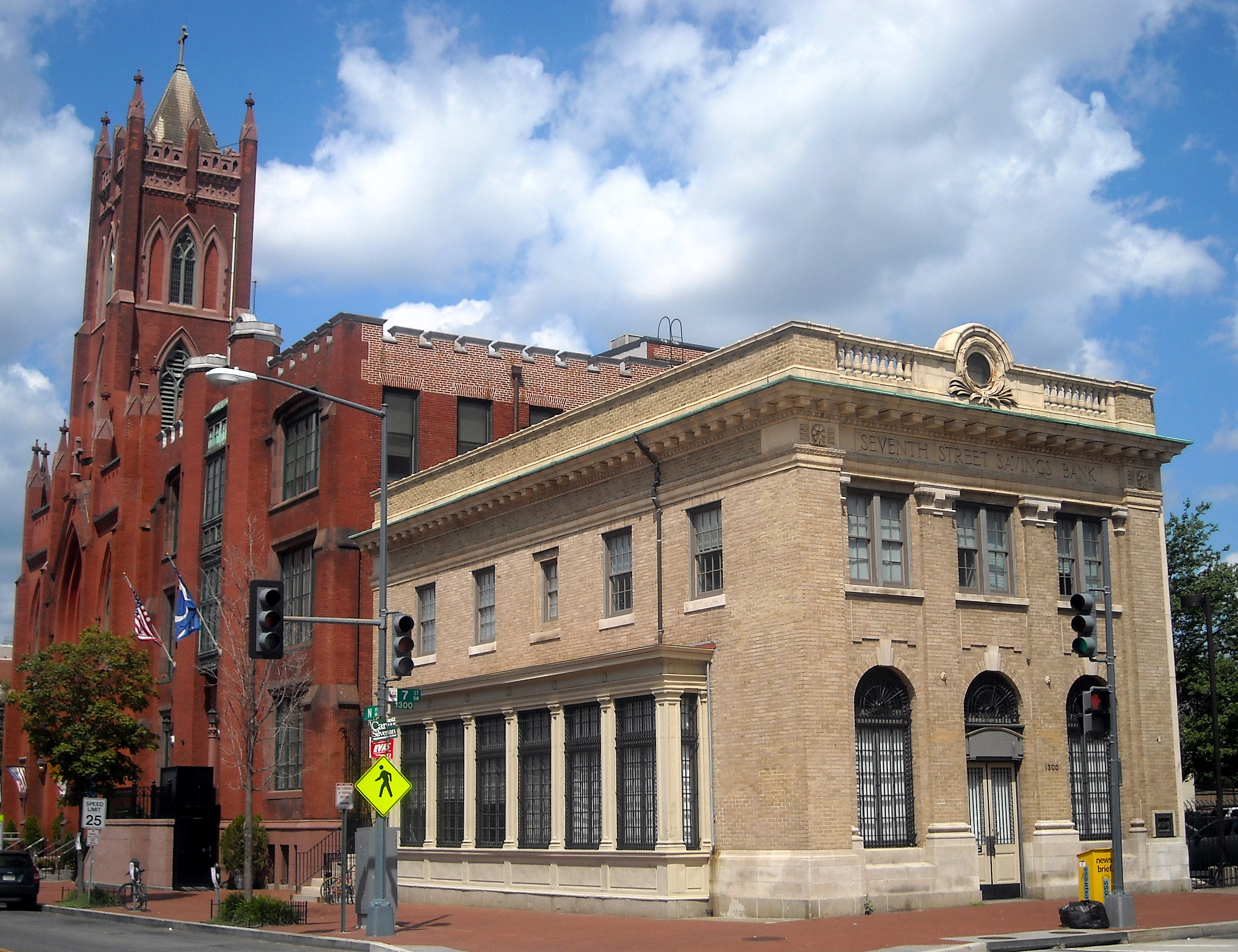
- Seventh Street Savings Bank in 2008

- Location within Washington, D.C.
- Location: 1300 7th St., NW; Washington, D.C.
- Coordinates: 38°54′26″N 77°1′20″W
- Built: 1913
- Architect: Alfred Rich & Alphonsus FitzSimons
- Architectural style: Classical Revival
- NRHP reference No.: 03000944
- Added to NRHP: September 17, 2003

Seventh Street Savings Bank is an historic structure located in the Shaw neighborhood of Washington, D.C. It has been listed on the District of Columbia Inventory of Historic Sites since 2002 and it was listed on the National Register of Historic Places in 2003.

== History ==
The bank was an independent neighborhood bank that formed in 1912. Alfred Rich & Alphonsus FitzSimons designed the building that was finished the following year. The two-story building had apartments upstairs. More apartments and commercial space was located in an adjacent wing that has subsequently been torn down. The apartments and commercial space were necessary to make the small institution feasible. The bank failed in the Banking Crisis of 1933. It was one of eight banks that merged and formed Hamilton National Bank. The structure is the last building in a one-time vibrant commercial block.

== Architecture ==
The exterior of the building features a temple-front façade. The structure is covered in textured buff brick and trimmed in limestone and terra cotta. The banking hall is lit by large arched windows with iron grills and a long side window bay.
