= Near Northeast (Washington, D.C.) =

Coordinates: 38.9013°N 77.0032°W

- Neighborhood
- Nicknames: H Street Corridor
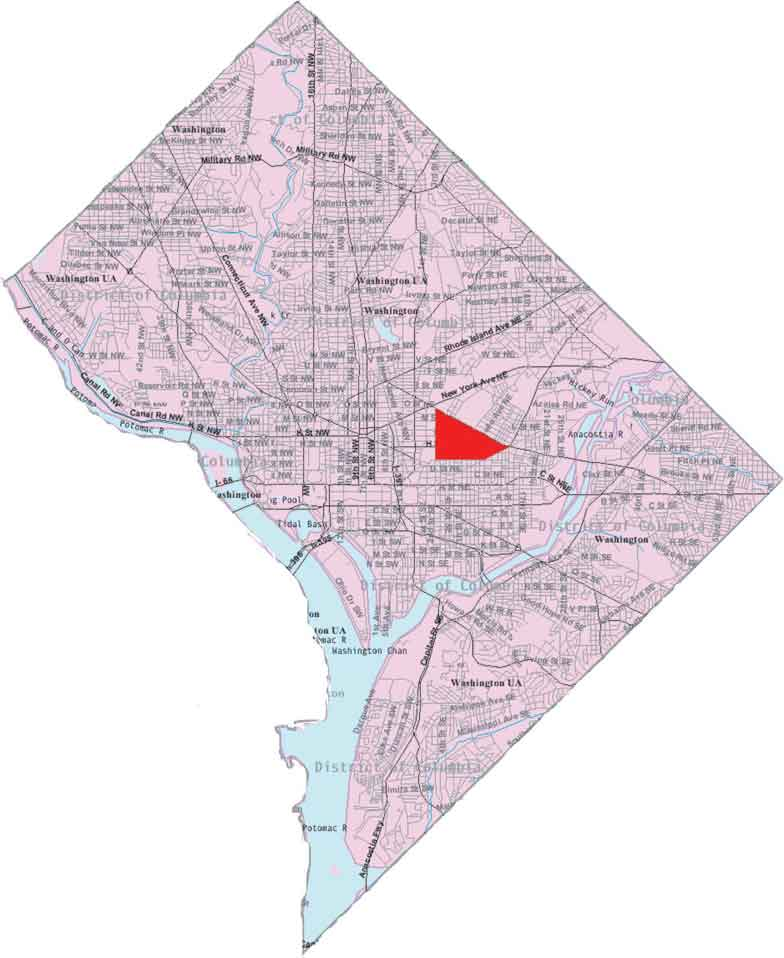
- Map of Washington, D.C., with Near Northeast highlighted in red
- Country: United States
- District: Washington, D.C.
- Ward: Ward 6

Government
  - Councilmember: Charles Allen
- Postal code: ZIP code
- Website: http://hstreet.org

Near Northeast is a neighborhood in Northeast Washington, D.C. It is bounded by North Capitol Street to the west, Florida Avenue to the north, F Street to the south, and 15th Street to the east.

== History ==
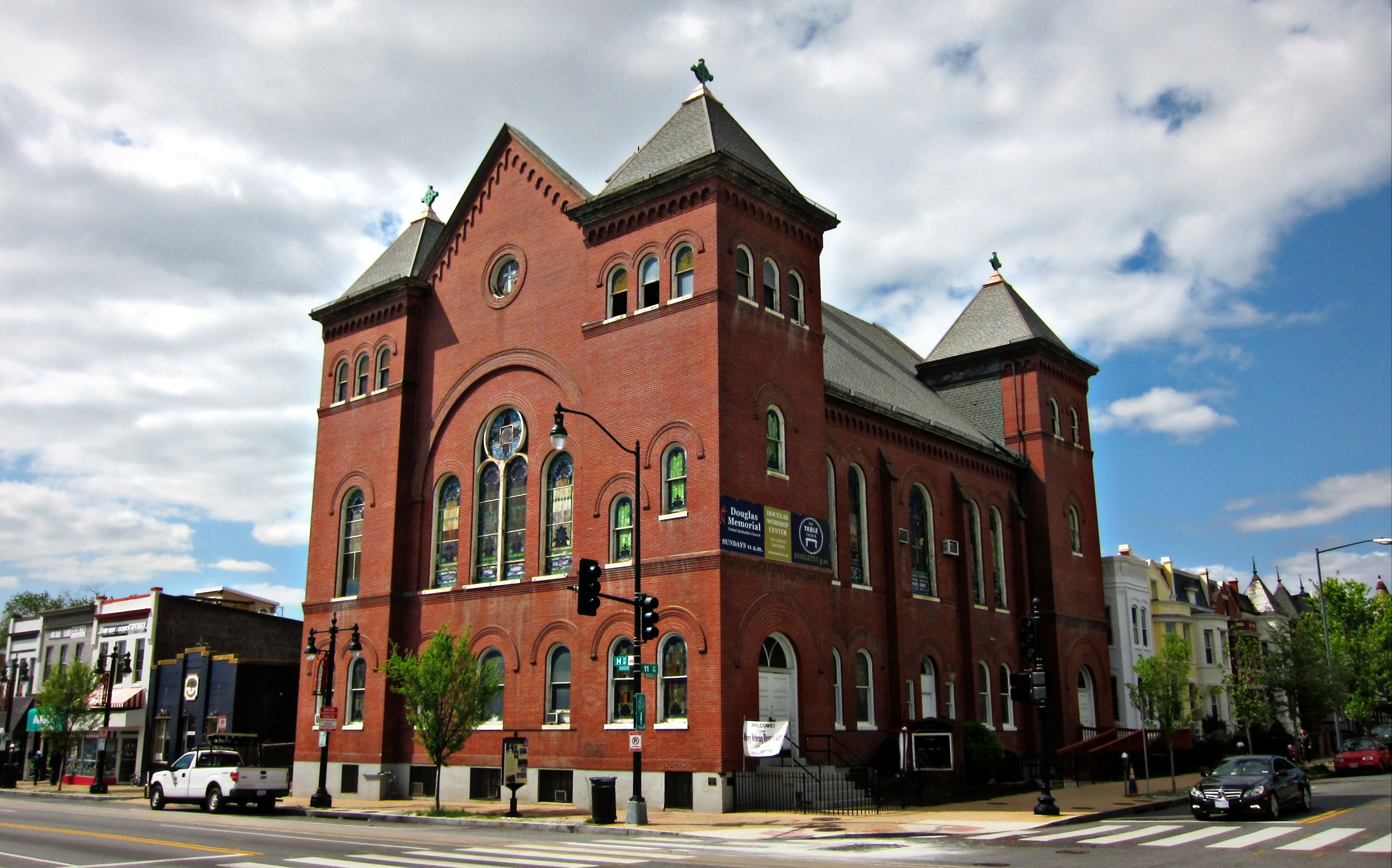
Douglas Memorial United Methodist Church on H Street NE

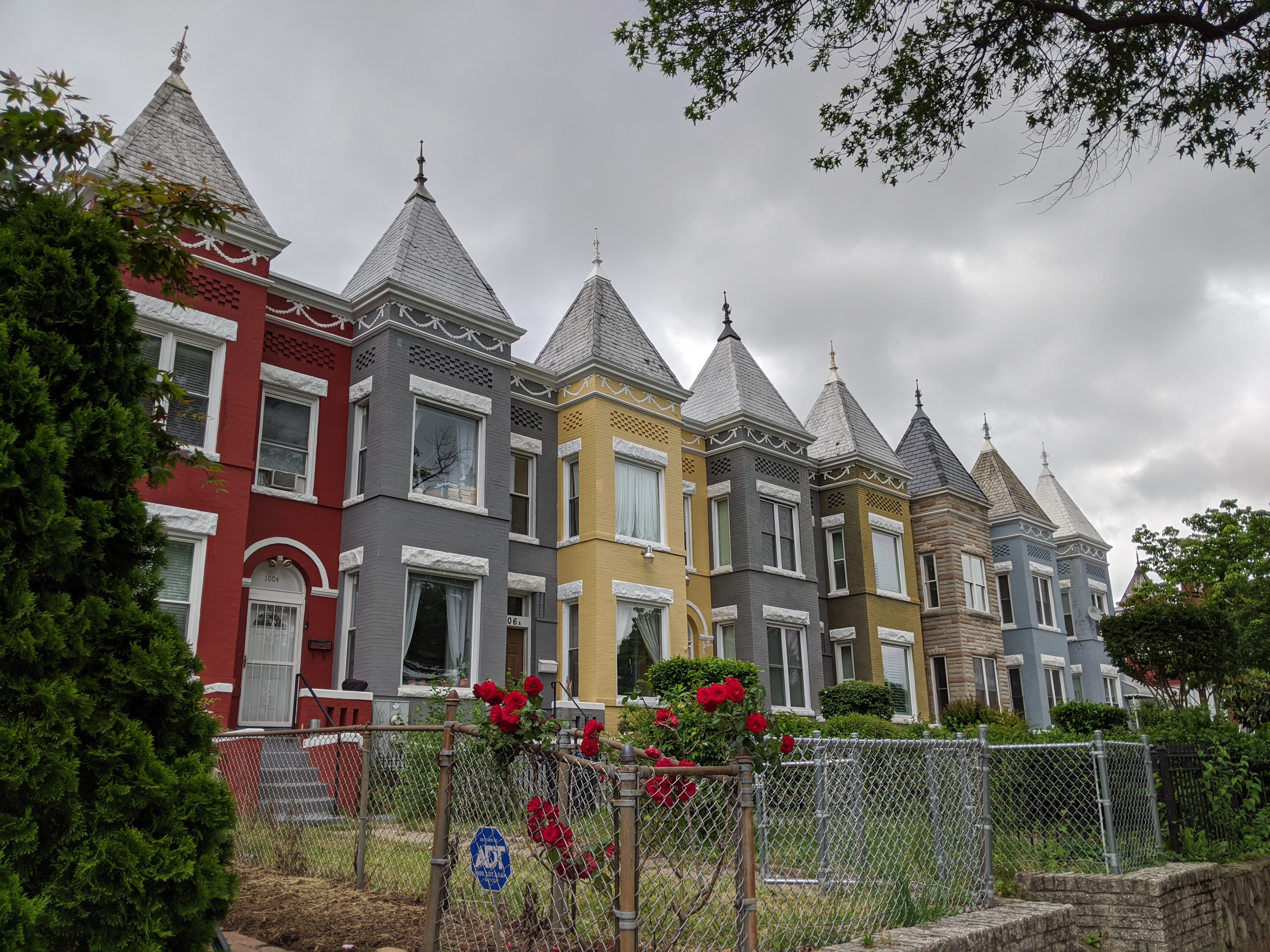
Rowhouses along K Street in Near Northeast

=== Early history ===
It is believed that the general area was occupied as early in the Paleo-Indian period (10,000-8,000 B.C.) all the way to the Woodland period (1000 B.C. to the time of European Contact). Several streams flowed throw the area feeding into Tiber Creek (also known as Goose Creek) making it an attractive area for settlements for Native tribes and hunting.

Near Northeast started a patchwork of several different European landowners' claims. Most of the land belonged to Notley Young, under the name of Youngsboro or Isherwood or Mill Tract by the 1790s. His property extended into what is today Trinidad. The other land owners were Daniel Carroll (who owned the hill on which the Capitol was built), George Walker and Abraham Young.

The tract of land was included shortly thereafter in the original survey of land for the new national capital, and Young and a few other landowners gave the land to the Federal government in exchange for a promise that Congress would divide the land into lots and return half of those lots to the original landowners.

Once the capital was created, streets were laid out in the grid system that Pierre L'Enfant had designed, with Boundary Street (renamed Florida Avenue on January 14, 1890) forming the northern border of the city. However, nearly all of the land remained undeveloped, used as farmland to cultivate fruits and vegetables for the fresh market in the more developed sections of the city. The land lots that were used for non-agricultural purposes in the early 19th century were mostly cemeteries.

=== 19th century ===
In the 1830s, the B&O Railroad constructed its Washington Branch, which entered the city of Washington at roughly 9th and Boundary Streets and proceeded through the neighborhood down I Street NE and Delaware Avenue NE to the New Jersey Avenue Station located between the current Union Station (built in 1907) and the Capitol. Its presence gradually led Old City to evolve into a working-class neighborhood: wood and coal yards appeared to serve the railroad and its terminals, with houses subsequently built for the employees of the railroad industries. The neighborhood remained undeveloped and sparsely populated through the end of the 19th century.

By the 1890s, H Street NE was the eastern terminus of the Washington streetcar system (at 15th Street). Many of the older houses still standing in the area were built in that period. Commercial development began to develop along H Street to serve these new customers.

=== 20th century ===
Near Northeast evolved into mixed neighborhood. It was a major center of black population in the first half of the 20th century as well as a significant neighborhood for immigrant populations from Ireland, Germany, Greece, Italy, Jews from Eastern Europe as well as African Americans. Many Russian-Jewish immigrants settled on H Street during the early 1900s, founding Ezras Israel Congregation in 1907. Union Station's construction destroyed the poor Irish neighborhood known as Swampoodle, buried Tiber Creek and allowed for development to increase. Today, Near Northeast sides on the Eastern part of the now non-existent Swampoodle.

During this same period, a twelve-block strip of H Street (from 3rd Street to 15th) became one of the most important shopping corridors in Washington. It catered primarily to a working-class clientele, but was densely commercial, with restaurants, theaters, banks, grocery stores and clothing stores. It was the location of the first Sears Roebuck store in Washington.

In addition, two of the most recognizable and popular locations were the whites-only Moderne-style Atlas Theater at 1331 H Street which opened in 1938. For black customers, the Plymouth Theater down the block at 1365 H Street opened its doors in 1943. Like the theaters, most of the businesses in the H Street corridor (and elsewhere in Old City) were strictly segregated, but some businesses (an unusual number of which were black-owned) catered to both black and white customers. By 1950, however, approximately 50 percent of the residents of Old City/Near Northeast were African American.

The neighborhood was devastated by the race riot that ripped Washington for the three days following the April 1968 assassination of Martin Luther King Jr. Order was restored with the assistance of the US military brought in to assist the DC Police. Looting, vandalism, and arson made Near Northeast one of the worst casualties of the riots; many burned-out or otherwise destroyed properties remained in that condition for decades. Most white residents moved out of the neighborhood to Maryland and Virginia. The neighborhood became a poor black neighborhood with few resources until its revitalization more than three decades later.

=== Present day ===
H Street, so long the center of the neighborhood's life, is being structured as an arts district. In 2002, H Street Main Street, in partnership with the city and community members started breathing new life in the neighborhood. Theaters, jazz clubs, performance spaces and exotic restaurants appeared in the neighborhood. In 2005 and 2006, more venues and bars opened in the H Street corridor. Business owners in that area are calling the area the Atlas District, after the movie theater (now a dance and performance studio) that has been its most prominent landmark for half a century.

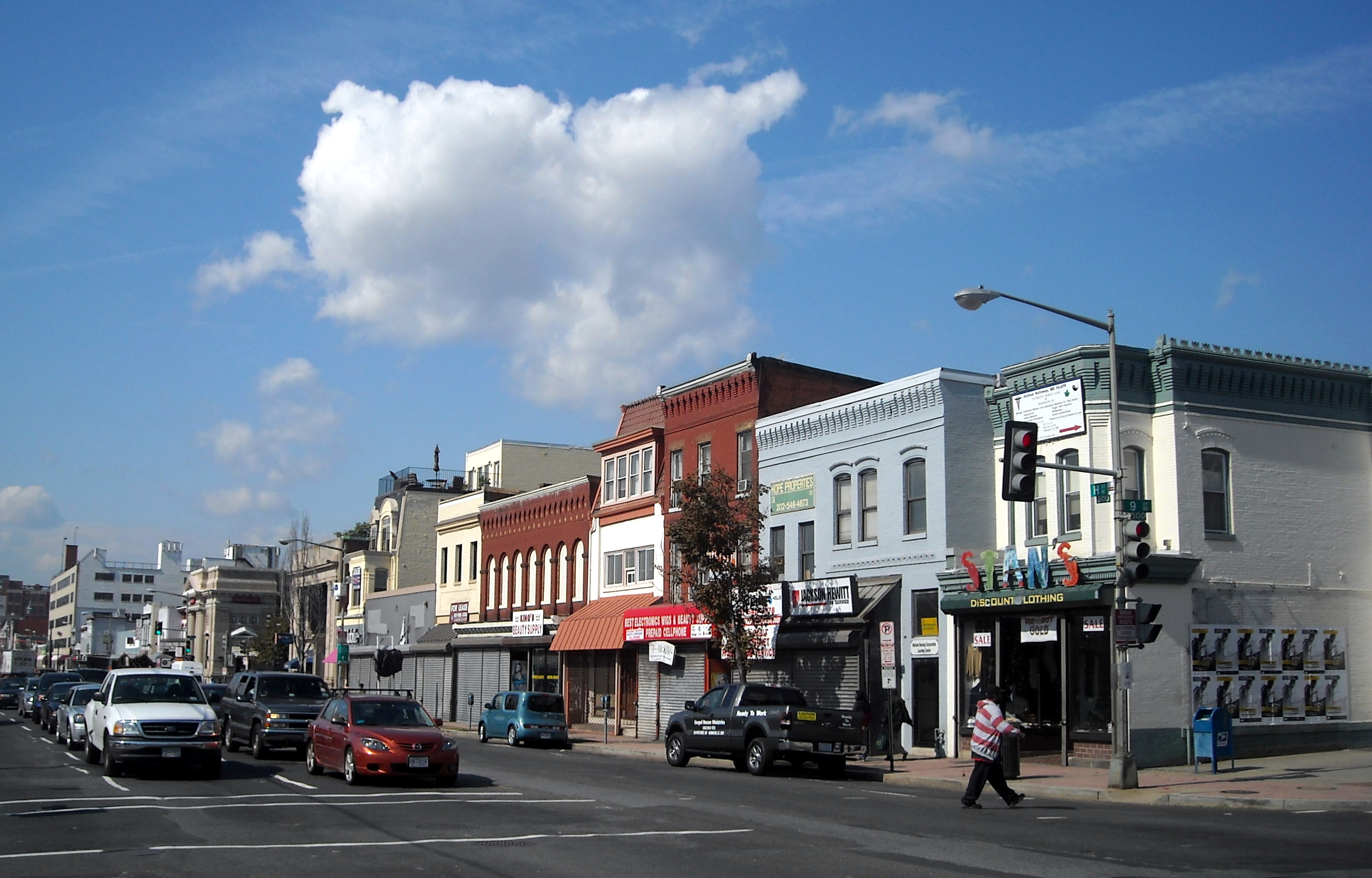
800 block of H Street NE in 2009

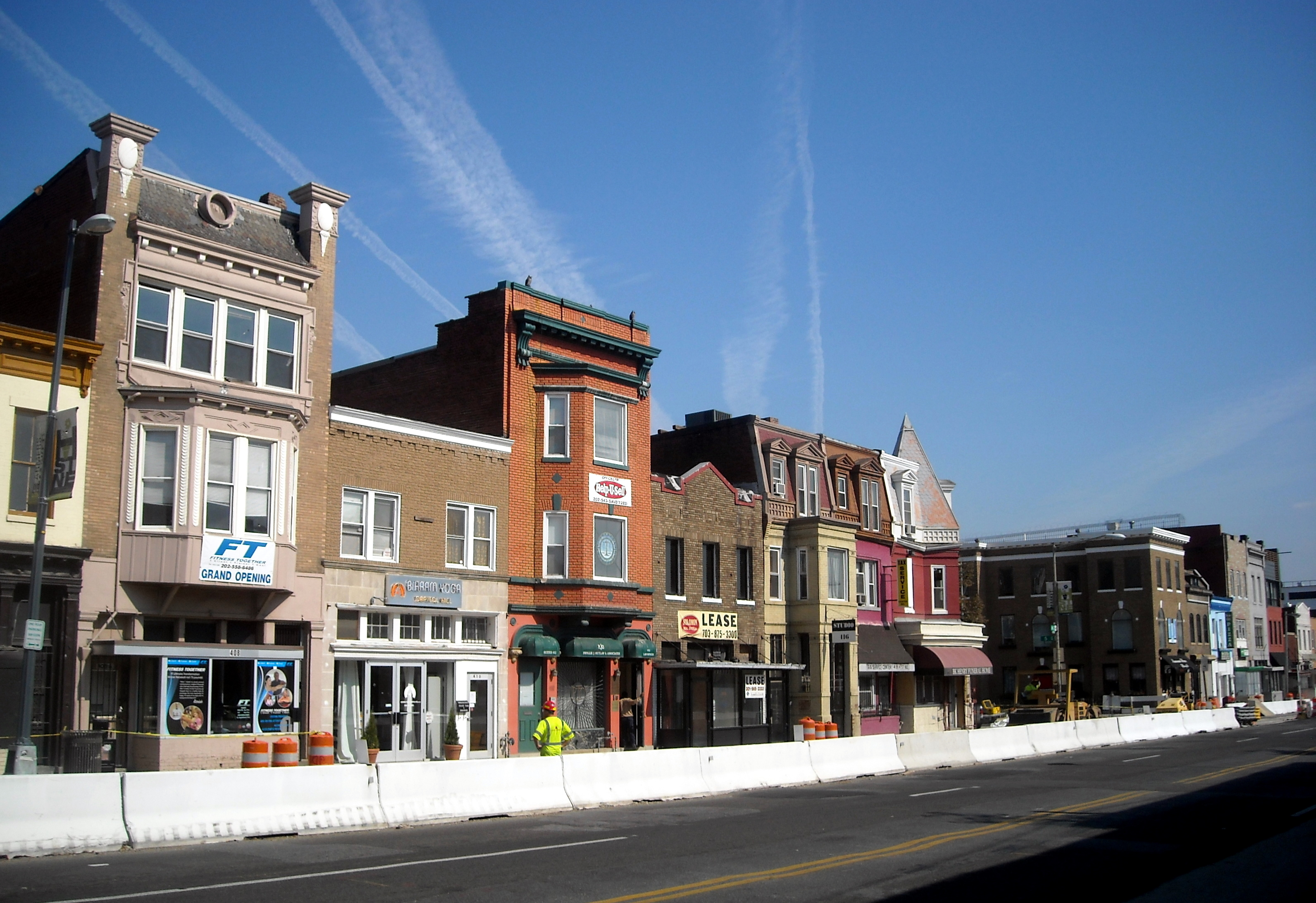
Construction of the DC Streetcar's H Street NE/Benning Road Line in 2009

The intersection of H Street and 7th Street NE in 2010

The intersection of H Street and 14th Street NE in 2010

A new wave of residents has rapidly changed the area with sit-down restaurants, hip bars, more upscale retail establishments. The older residents note that this process has also made the neighborhood feel safer with more affluent residents investing in the community. This is a return to a more diverse community as it was before the 1968 riots when most white residents left.

== Neighborhood landmarks ==
=== The Northeast Temple and Market ===
In 1897, The Northeast Temple and Market, an indoor marketplace and Lodge temple was built. These were the first buildings electrified on H Street NE. The Northeast Temple was located at 1119-1123 H Street NE and the Market was located next door from 1125 H Street NE to the corner of 12th Street NE.

==== Apollo Theater ====
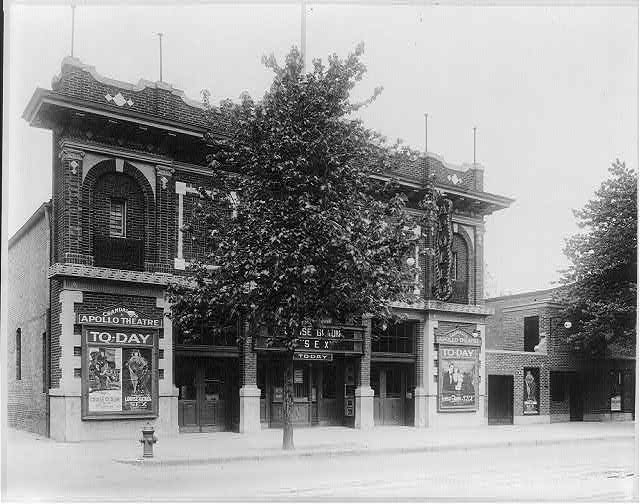
The Apollo Theater in 1920

In 1913, the Apollo Theater was built on H Street NE. It was located at 624-634 H Street NE. The Theater showed many of the popular black and white movies of the time. It played silent movies and by the 1930s, it was obsolete as it was not able to play "talkies". The land was sold to Ourisman Chevrolet, Inc. who also owned the land across the street. The theater was demolished in 1955 and replaced by a five-story service center used by the dealership. A new Buick dealership took over the premise in 1966. The property changes hand several times from the 1960s to the 1990s until the building is leased in 1999 to the "H Street Self Storage Center". Finally, in 2014, the land was sold and the buildings demolished, to be replaced by the current "Apollo" luxury apartments and the Whole Foods.

=== Landmarks still standing ===
==== Home for the Aged Men and Women ====
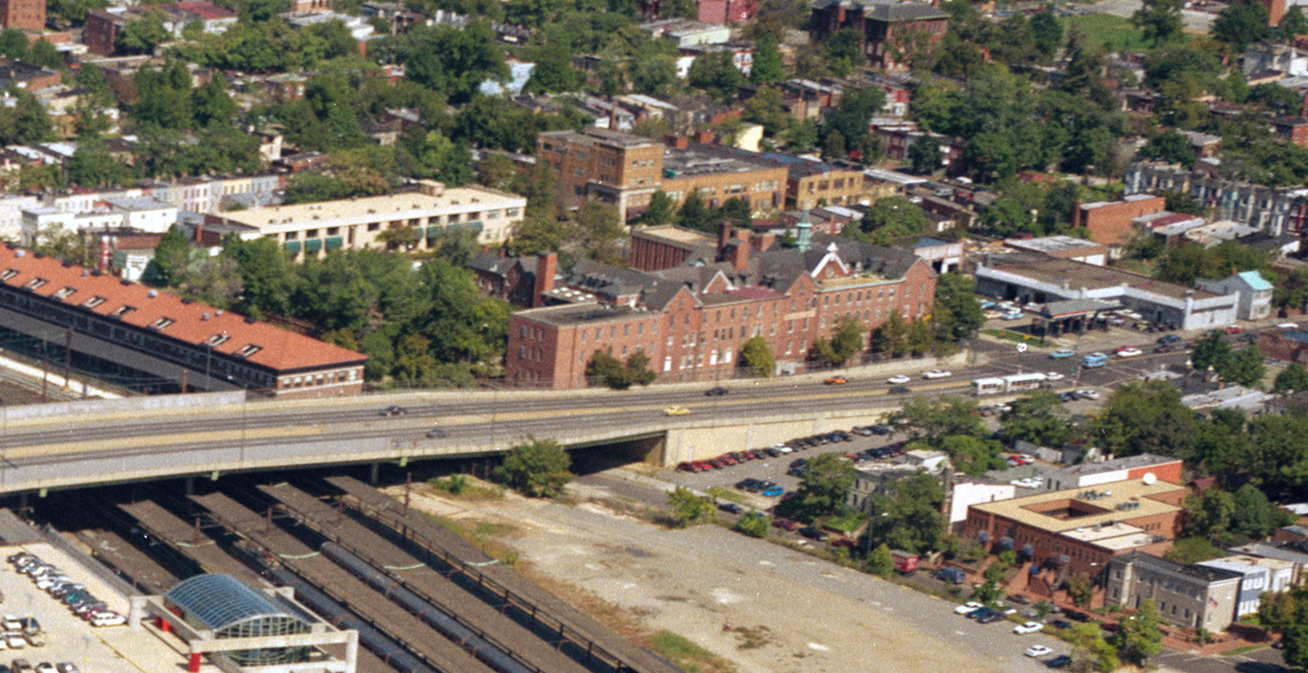
The former Home for the Aged Men and Women in the 1980s

In 1872, the Little Sisters of the Poor built the Home for the Aged Men and Women on H Street NE between 2nd Street NE and 3rd Street NE. It would become a well-known local institution caring for elderly poor residents regardless of race, sex or religion. The order provided care to residents who could not care for themselves and had no family to care for them. They relied on donations from individuals and businesses to support their mission.

In 1977, the Little Sisters of the Poor moved out due to the construction of the Hopscotch Bridge under their windows. The building became vacant until 1979, when the National Children's Museum occupied it, moving out in 2004. It was visited on January 22, 1990 by First Lady Barbara Bush to read Three Billy Goats Gruff to a group of children as part of her Foundation for Family Literacy. It was purchased in 2005 and parts were demolished and replaced by a luxury apartment complex.

==== Uline Arena ====
On January 28, 1941, the Uline Arena located at 1132, 1140 and 1146 3rd Street NE opened. It was an indoor arena built by Miguel "Michael" Uline. The first show was the Ice-Capades as it was primarily designed as an ice-rink. It was the home of the Washington Lions hockey team from 1941 to 1949. It also operated as basketball venue and was the home of the Washington Capitols and the Georgetown Hoyas men's basketball. It became the Washington Coliseum in 1960. It also served as a concert venue. In 1964, The Beatles played their first concert in the United States and taking the country by storm. It also featured Bob Dylan, The Temptations and many other bands from the 1960s and 1970s. It was also a venue used for one of the inauguration balls of President Dwight D. Eisenhower in 1953 and by the Civil rights movement with Elijah Muhammad and Malcolm X speaking there in 1959 and 1961. It was used as a temporary detention center for protesters from May 3 to 5, 1971 during the 1971 May Day protests. Today, the renovated building is home to the DC REI flagship.

==== Other theaters ====
Of the many movie theaters in Old City/Near Northeast, two of the most prominent still stand on H Street, although both are now used for different purposes. One, the old Moderne style Atlas Theater, has been renovated Atlas Performing Arts Center, as a center for dance and the performing arts. Its neighbor, the Plymouth Theater, for a time named the H Street Playhouse, was the home of the theatrical company called the Theater Alliance.

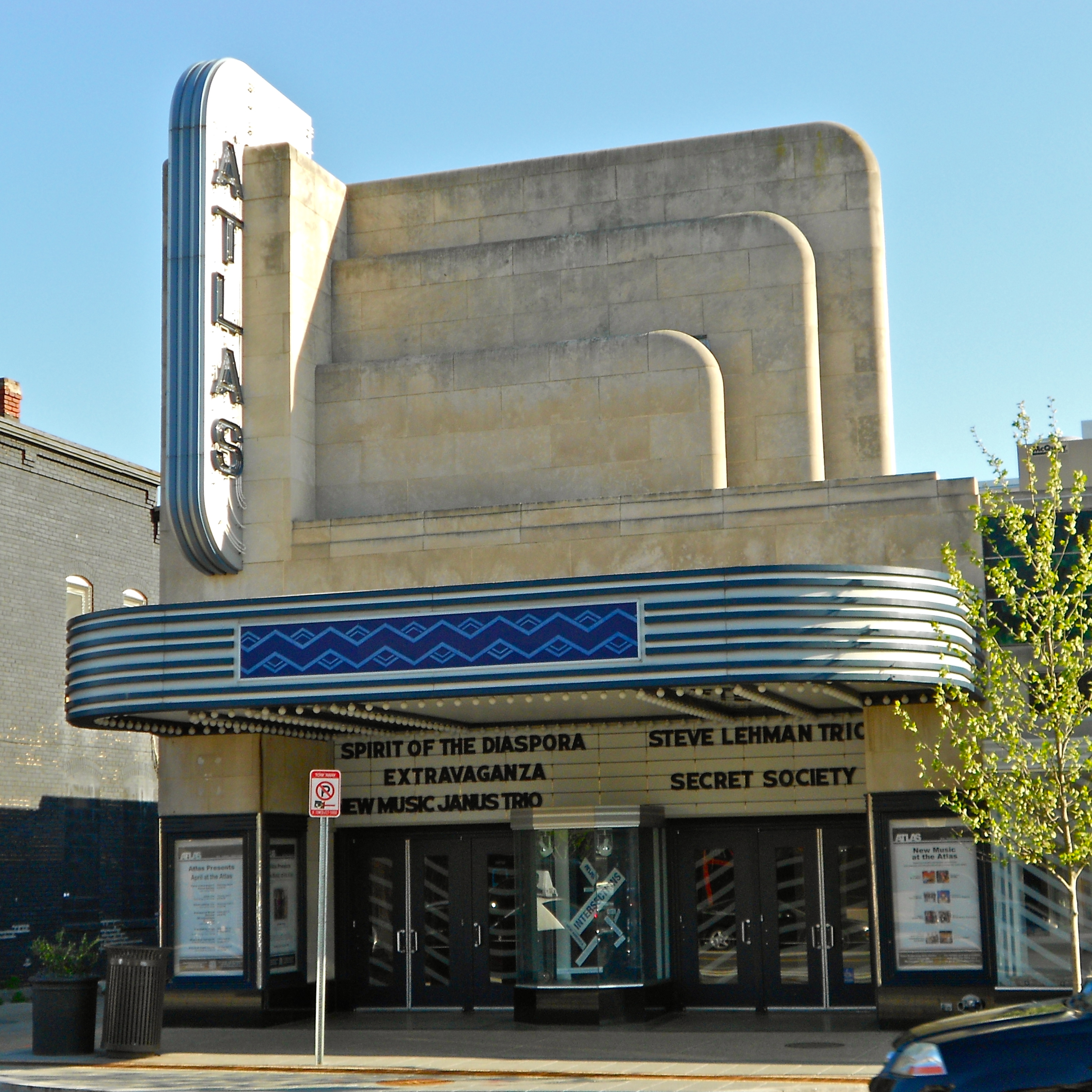
The Atlas Theater in 2012

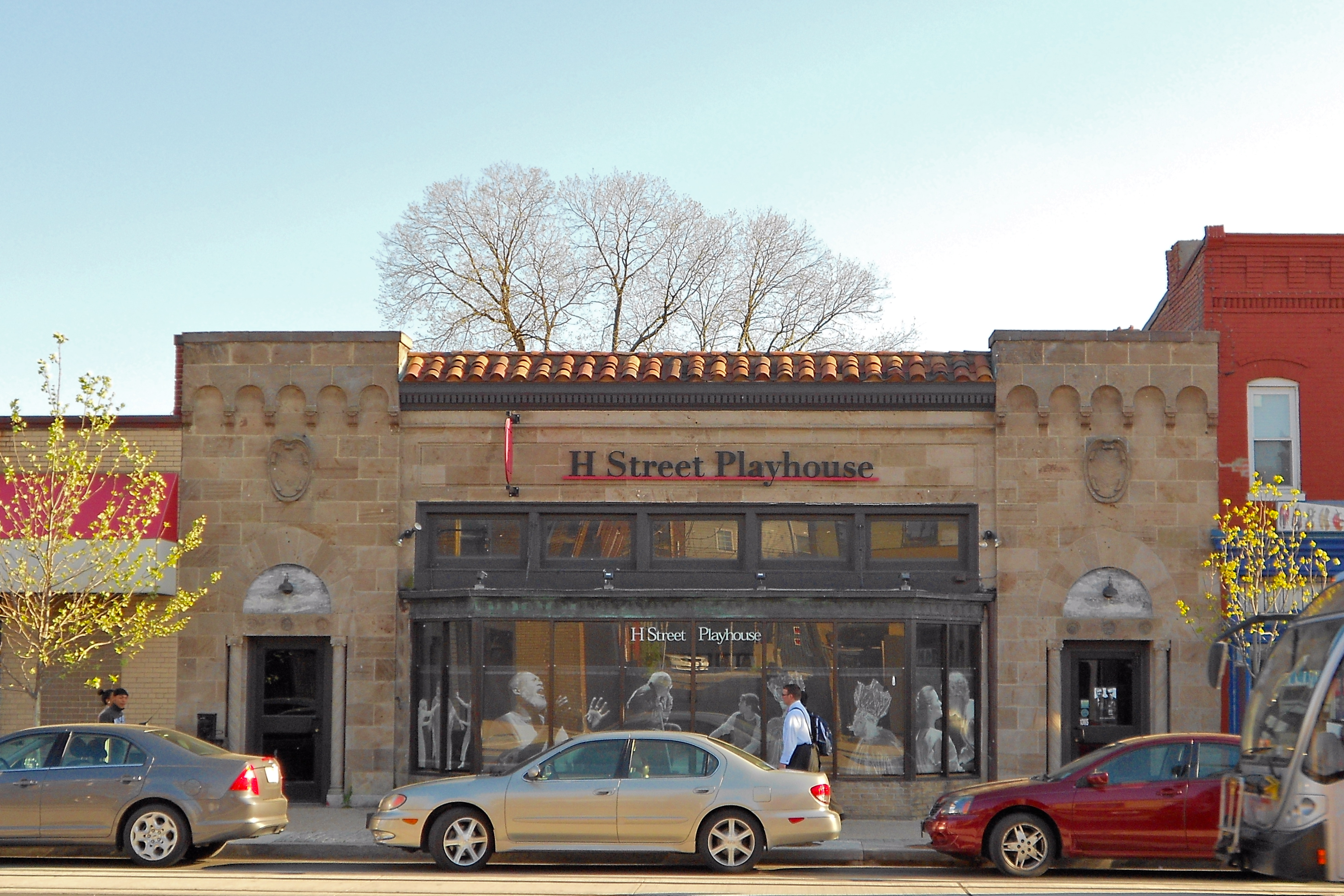
The Plymouth Theater in 2012

== Nomenclature ==
The neighborhood has taken on a variety of unofficial nicknames, most with little success.

Realtors tried to introduce the portmanteau SoFlo (a combination of South of Florida Avenue), hoping to attract an affluent, younger demographic. Residents and realtors also tried to popularize the term "Capitol Hill North," hoping to benefit from the higher market values of properties directly to the south on Capitol Hill.

Businessmen attempting to revitalize the western section of Near Northeast tried to introduce the term Atlas District, a reference to the Atlas Theater. However, residents have been slow to embrace any of these terms and instead identify themselves as "living in Northeast", "living off H Street", or "from Near Northeast".

== Infrastructure ==
Near Northeast is served by two stations on the Red Line of the Washington Metro: Union Station and the NoMa – Gallaudet University station which was renamed in June 2012 from the name New York Ave–Florida Ave–Gallaudet University Metro station. Since both of these metro stations are on the western side of the neighborhood, several bus lines bring commuters to the above stations.

A modern streetcar runs from the back of Union Station down to Benning Road since February 27, 2016. It is the first in Washington, DC since the previous system was dismantled in 1962.

As part of the city's Sustainability Plan, DDOT has also added several bikes lanes running east to west on G Street NE and I Street NE as well as north to south on 4th Street NE and 6th Street NE. Multiple Capital Bikeshare stations have also been added in several key areas of the neighborhood.

== Administration ==
Near Northeast is located in entirely in Ward 6 and represented locally by Council Member Charles Allen.

Its citizens are represented by two Advisory Neighborhood Commissions depending on their location:

- ANC6C: western part from Union Station to 8th Street NE
- ANC6A: eastern part from 8th Street NE to Starburst Plaza
