= Joe Englert =

American restaurateur (1961–2020)

Joseph A. Englert
- Born: January 29, 1961; New Kensington, Pennsylvania
- Died: August 20, 2020 (aged 59); Washington, D.C., United States
- Occupation: Restaurateur
- Parent(s): William and Sylvia (Chitti) Englert

Joseph A. Englert (January 29, 1961 – August 20, 2020) was an American restaurateur.

He and his partners were instrumental in the transformation and revitalization of the Atlas District in Washington, D.C. In total, they opened 30 well-known bars and restaurants in Washington, D.C.

== Early life and education ==
Englert was born in New Kensington, Pennsylvania to William and Sylvia (Chitti) Englert. He attended St. Joseph Grade School and Valley High School in New Kensington. He graduated from Pennsylvania State University.

== Career ==
After graduating from college, in 1984, Joe moved to Washington D.C. to write for the Pentagon newspaper.

In 1988, while he was a bartender and a struggling writer, Englert bet a friend that he could throw a raucous club party in Adams Morgan despite the dead scene. In the 5 years that followed, Englert opened several themed bars: Insect Club, a creepy space slung with a gigantic spider's web; 15 Mins., a neon rock dive; the Big Hunt, with a safari theme; Zig Zag Cafe, a retro romance coffeehouse; and State of the Union, an Eastern Bloc eatery that served Cossack salads and Marx burgers (none of these was in Adams Morgan).

In 2004, Englert purchased 8 properties in the Atlas District on H Street after the city announced plans to renovate and reopen the long defunct Atlas Performing Arts Center. Englert spent $3 million to buy and renovate the properties and opened 8 restaurants: The Argonaut, The Palace of Wonders, The Rock and Roll Hotel, The Red and the Black, Granville Moore's, Sticky Rice, and The H Street Country Club. Although he is often credited with opening the beloved H St dive bar The Pug, he was not involved. The Pug is owned and operated by Joe’s long time friend and colleague, Tony “Tony T” Tomelden.

Some of his other establishments included Lucky Bar, DC9, Trusty's Full-Serve Bar, the Capitol Lounge, Pour House, the Politiki, and McClellan's Retreat, named for civil war soldier George B. McClellan.

== Personal life ==
Englert lived in Cleveland Park with his wife. They had 2 sons. He played tennis every weekday morning. He wore a toupee since he started balding in his early 20s. Englert died from complications of surgery on August 20, 2020.
