= Home for the Aged Men and Women =

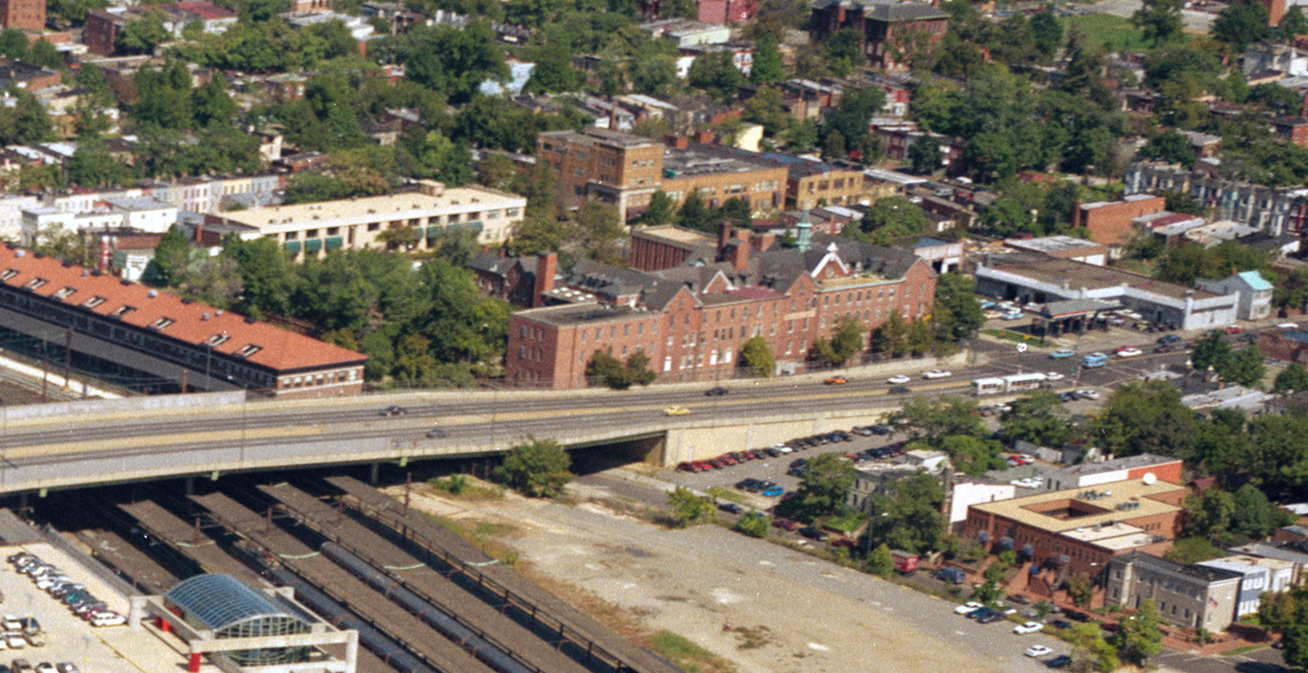
- Detail of an Aerial view of Union Station showing the former Home for the Aged Men and Women in the 1980s

- Location within Washington, D.C.

Geography
- Location: Washington, DC, United States
- Coordinates: 38°54′01″N 77°00′09″W

Organization
- Religious affiliation: Little Sisters of the Poor

Services
- Beds: 300

History
- Founded: March 19th 1873
- Closed: March 1977

Links
- Lists: Hospitals in the United States

The Home for the Aged Men and Women also sometimes known as the Home for the Aged, Poor and Infants was a charitable organization located on H Street NE, between 2nd Street NE and 3rd Street NE, next to the train line running down I Street NE, in Washington, D.C. This was a working-class neighborhood next to Swampoodle. It was organized and managed by the Little Sisters of the Poor and provided housing, food and care for elderly men and women (over 65 years of age) who had no relatives to take care of them, regardless of religion or race. The Sisters would beg for their needs as well as for those of their residents as prescribed by their order. It opened on March 19, 1873, and expending for the rest of the 19th century. It became a place of life for many older destitute individuals with the yearly distraction of the high society of diplomats and socialites of Washington, D.C., visiting the home on Saint Joseph's Day. It survived the 1968 riots but was a victim of the 1970s urban movement focused on freeways and cars. Today, it is a luxury apartment complex off of H Street and its many restaurants and bars.

== History ==
After the Civil War, the Northeast quadrant of Washington, D.C., was still relatively rural. An Irish Catholic neighborhood known as Swampoodle had developed in the vicinity of the railroad tracks running from the New Jersey Avenue Station, located next to the Capitol and heading North to Baltimore. It was in this new developing area across the tracks that the Little Sisters of the Poor had acquired a tract of land. The land was said to have once been owned by Thomas Law who had married the eldest granddaughter of Martha Washington and step-granddaughter of George Washington.

=== The First Home ===
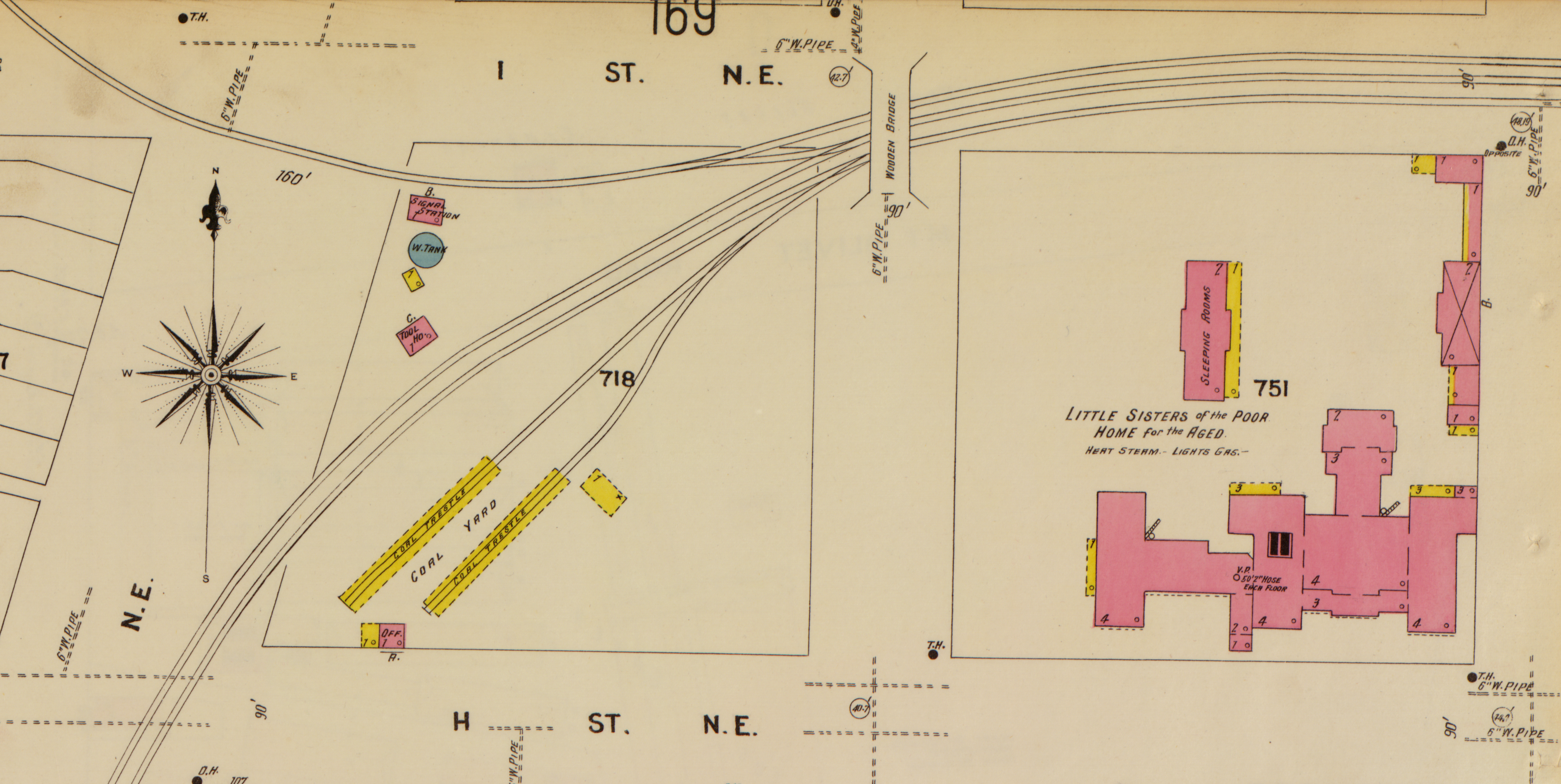
The Home as it was in 1903 prior to the construction of Union Station

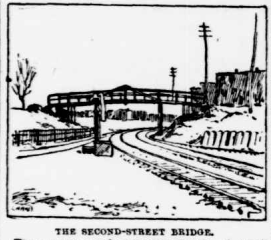
The 2nd Street Bridge located next to the Home allowing local residents to cross safely over Baltimore and Ohio Railroad in 1890

The cornerstone of the building was laid on Sunday, July 23, 1872, on square 751 on H Street NE between 2nd and 3rd Street NE following a procession. In attendance were the Knights of Saint Patrick and the Hibernian Benevolent Society. During construction, the Sisters were temporarily staying in a house next to Saint Patrick's Church thanks to the hospitality of Father Walter. That house later became the meeting place of the Carroll Library Association's meeting place. The sisters move in their new home on March 19, 1873. That date was symbolic as it was Saint Joseph's Day, their patron saint. Archbishop Bayley visited the Home soon after its opening on May 20, 1973.

The Home was funded by private donations as well as fund-raising events held by various organizations. One such event took place on May 6, 1873, called the Grand Promenade Concert at the Masonic Temple and was organized by the Diplomatic Corps. The Marine Band played as instructed by Secretary George M. Robeson. All proceeds went to the Home. On July 17, 1873, It also received $750 from the Legislative Assembly of the District of Columbia under an appropriation for charitable organizations.

On July 24, 1873, a new well and pump were inaugurated on the premises of the Home. The Society of Saint Vincent paid for it and it was blessed by Father Walter.

By April 1874, the Home housed about sixty residents. The building had reached its capacity and it was obvious it needed to be enlarged with an additional wing. The organization was several thousands of dollars in debt. Events were being organized to help with this funding but many other elderly men and women could not be accepted. The additional wing would be planned once the current debt was repaid.

=== The Chapel ===
The Sisters were given $25,000 by the Commissioners of the District of Columbia on June 23, 1874. That same year, the construction of the new chapel started. Archbishop Bayley came to lay the cornerstone with the local Catholic clergy on October 18, 1874, at 4 PM. The Chapel was to be 24 feet by 60 feet and sit on the rear of the center building to which it will be connected. The cornerstone was made of Brownstone and inscribed with J.,M.,J. - Jesus, Mary, Joseph, 1874 and contained several papers setting forth the date of the laying of the cornerstone, by whom it was laid, the name of the President of the United States (Ulysses S. Grant) and copies of the daily papers of the city. The Center Building will be 67 by 92 feet (20 m × 28 m), four stories high and house 100 poor elderly residents. The cost was estimated at $26,000 and the $25,000 obtained from Congress (via the Commissioners) in June would cover this cost. The architect was E.F. Baldwin and the contractor T.C. Wilson. Completion of the project was expected by June 1, 1875.

1874 was also the year when the Sisters received lots 9, 10, 11, 12, 1 and 2 on their square. The lots were acquired on July 29, 1874. That same year, the Home received an unusual but useful long term donation. On June 8, 1874, Great Falls Ice Company's board decided to donate to the Home as well as to several other Christian charities free ice.

The Chapel was dedicated on Sunday, November 14, 1875, at 3pm by Archbishop Bayley in the presence of several representatives of the local clergy and worshipers. Part of the main building was opened as well as the broad veranda. The interior of the chapel was very plain with the walls and columns covered in pure white. A small gallery for singers and worshipers was located above the entrance. Over the altar, standing in a small niche was a life-size statue of the Virgin Mary and over the side altars were figures of Christ. For the occasion, a profusion of flowers had been brought in and the various figures were wreathed with them. It was said that the flowers' arrangement were influenced by the French heritage of the Sisters. One side altar had red flowers, the other was covered in white flowers and the main altar was covered in rare flowers.

=== Expansion ===
While the Home was already well sized, it was unable to provide for all those in need of many of the poor in the area. It had already expanded dramatically in only a few years but the cost was high. A report is published in December 1875 in which the property is broken down by cost. The lot cost $12,000, the wing and stable cost $20,000 and the main building also cost $20,000. At this point, the Home has 80 residents.

The sisters were working to improve the comfort of its residents and its operation. On July 7, 1876, the Sisters receive a permit from Inspector Thomas Plowman to erect a smoking room that would be one story high providing a place for residents to smoke. On October 21, 1878, they receive a permit to build a carriage house from Inspector Entwisle.

A new wing was planned to house more residents. On August 25, 1879, Father Walter awarded the contract for the wing to Wade & Herlihy. The wing would match the existing east wing and would cost about $11,000. Construction started on September 1, 1879, with the goal of having it roofed by December 1 of that same year. The addition would be 86 feet (26 m) long, 32 feet (9.8 m) wide and four story high. It was made of red brick and trimmed with Connecticut brownstone as the other buildings with a sloped roof. It had fifteen spacious rooms with light and ventilation, closets and bathrooms. On each floor a large airy hall ran the entire length of the building on each floor.

- Basement: 11 feet (3.4 m) high with the laundry room (34 by 20 feet (10.4 m × 6.1 m)), a furnace room, an iron room (29 by 20 feet (8.8 m × 6.1 m)), closets, bath rooms and an dumb-waiter.
- 1st floor: 13.5 feet (4.1 m) high with the men's siting-room (52 by 20 feet (15.8 m × 6.1 m)), shops (20 by 17 feet (6.1 m × 5.2 m)), closets, bath rooms and an dumb-waiter.
- 2nd floor: 12.5 feet (3.8 m) high with the sitting room for the infirm (20 by 21 feet (6.1 m × 6.4 m)), a dormitory (32 by 21 feet (9.8 m × 6.4 m)), a pharmacy (12 by 20 feet (3.7 m × 6.1 m)), closets, bath rooms and an dumb-waiter.
- 3rd floor: 12.5 feet (3.8 m) high with two rooms (26 by 52 feet (7.9 m × 15.8 m)) (29 by 20 feet (8.8 m × 6.1 m)).
- Attic: 9.8 feet (3.0 m) high with 2 rooms (52 by 29 feet (15.8 m × 8.8 m)) (29 by 20 feet (8.8 m × 6.1 m)).

The 1880 District Appropriation Bill was taken by Congress and awarded $5,000 to the organization to assist in the construction. The 47th Congress passes an act allowing the closing of an alley in square 751 based on a petition by the Little Sisters of the Poor on August 7, 1882.

=== Community ===
By that time, the Home was a major part of the community. It had a capacity to care for 200 residents and housed 150 by May 1882. It was obvious that this ministry was here to stay. The same year, three of the Sisters entered their intention of becoming United-States citizens by making a statement to the clerk's office at the City Hall on May 17, 1881. They were:

- Emilie Armance Boussion, sister of "Germaine de la Croix" from Anjou, France
- Marie Caroline Schmitt, Sister of "Pacifique de St. Joseph" from Alsace, then part of Prussia (now in France)
- Sophie Fraisse, Sister of the "Hyacinth Therese" from Dauphiné, France

Until 1882, the Home had been exclusively housing White residents. It opened a section for Black residents in 1882 and by 1883 had 28 residents.

=== Further Expension ===
In 1884, the Sisters received $25,000 from Congress as part of the District appropriations. Earlier that year in March, Samuel J. Randall, a Democrat from Pennsylvania had asked Congress to appropriate $50,000 toward the construction of another wing 90 by 76 feet (27 m × 23 m).

On November 6, 1884, several lots are transferred over to the Sisters: lot 3, 4 and part of lot 5.

=== Notable events ===
On May 1, 1885, the Sisters were granted permission from Interior Secretary Lamar to stand in the corridors and by the front door of the Department of the Interior and solicit contributions from the employees. Two Sisters were stationed that same day at noon holding a basket to receive monetary contributions.

The solicitation of money in public sometimes caused issues. One incident took place in November 1889. Two Sisters had been soliciting donations at the Pay Office in the Pension Building where all the clerks would go twice a month to collect their paycheck. However, on November 20, 1889, the United States Commissioner of Pensions General Raum determined that it was not proper for these collections to take place in a public building where all collection of money is prohibited. He considered it unfair that this charity would be able to collect there while others could not. He stated this to the Sisters upon their visit. However, he would continue his monthly contributions as he had done previously.

On January 27, 1892, in the afternoon, a crash occurred in which two Sisters were slightly injured. The No. 8 Hose Carriage from the Fire Department was responding to a fire in the Alma House when it collided with the Sisters' carriage at the intersection of 11th Street NW and B Street NW (now Constitution Avenue NW) throwing the two Sisters and injuring them in the process.

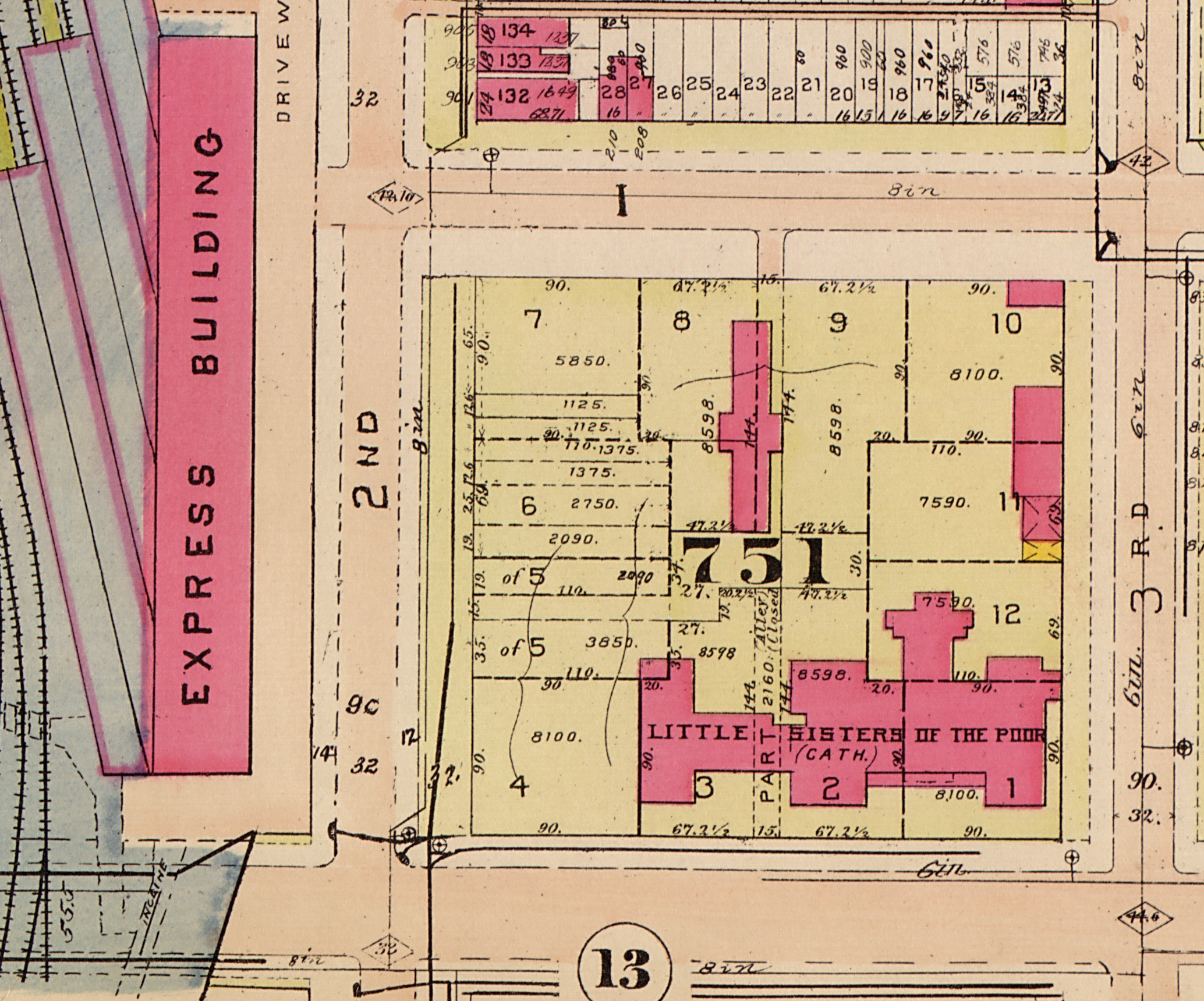
Map showing the Home for the Aged Men and Women in 1909 next to the new railway tracks on the multiple lots owned by the Sisters

The remaining alleys on square 751 were closed by an Act of Congress on December 21, 1893. It had received favorable support form the Commissioners and secured the floor of the Senate with the help of Senator Martin a Democrat from the State of Kansas. The owners of the adjacent properties received the freed land.

Part of lot 7 is sold to the Home for $2,000 On January 16, 1900, and part of lot 6 is sold to the Sisters for $3,000 the following day. These transactions gave the Sisters the remaining portions of the square. On June 27, 1900, a neighbor by the name of William McGrath wrote a letter to the Commissioners to complain that the Sisters were building a brick wall closing up a sidewalk at the corner of 2nd St NE and I street NE. After an investigation by the engineer, it was determined that the Sister owned the entire Square 751 and were therefore entitled to enclose the square with the wall per the surveyor's measurements without encroaching on the public space. As the railroad rain right next to the property, the need for a sidewalk was not needed. They were required however to open the alley as this was considered illegal to block public space. However, a few days later, on July 5, 1900, it was brought to Captain Beach, Engineer Commissioner, that the land of the alley had been handed back to the property owners when it was closed by Act of Congress on December 21, 1893. This brought to a close the conflict with the neighbor.

By 1900, the number of residents had reached 300. Life went on in a similar manner for most of the first half of the 20th century with few notable events. The west wall of the building was badly damaged in a storm on June 28, 1911.

In October 1939, the Sisters celebrated the 100th Anniversary of the Order with a three-day celebration with several masses involving many prominent figures of the local Catholic Church. This included Msgr. Joseph M. Corrigan, rector of Catholic University of America and Most Reverent Amleto Giovanni Cicognani, apostolic-delegate to the United States.

On March 28, 1954, the Home was visited for the first time by the Mother General of the Order. Mother Genevieve St. Chantal of Rennes, France was being honored during a reception in the late afternoon during which she thanked the many people who had donated to the Sisters over the years to help the elderly.

=== Moving Out ===
Interior of the Children's Museum in the former Chapel in the 1980s

In 1977, the Sisters announced that they were moving to a new Home with the 118 residents at the time. The area had been heavily damaged by the 1968 Riots with many H Street shops being burned to the ground. However, it was the construction of the concrete overpass over the Union Station rail tracks connecting H Street NW to H Street NE known as Hopscotch Bridge which was the reason for the move. Rats were coming from the construction site into the building, the noise generated by the construction and the noise and pollution coming from the traffic. The bridge was built so close to the property that the main entrance of Saint Joseph's Chapel had to be permanently closed. When construction of the six-lane highway bridge started in 1975, the Sisters and the 152 residents started noticing that the walls and floors of the residence were shifting, bathroom tiles were falling and cracks had appeared in multiple places. Paint was falling off the walls due to the vibrations and many rocks had flown into the windows. Vandalism and arson had also become a problem. In 1977, the Sisters announced that they were moving to a new Home with the 118 residents at the time.

On December 1, 1977, they received the Cardinal O'Boyle Award of Patriotism awarded unanimously by the Fourth Degree Knights of Columbus. The plaque was presented by retired Archbishop of Washington, Cardinal O'Boyle himself.

After 106 years of service in the city for the elderly, it was felt that the local government was pushing them out. The Sisters started raising funds for the new house. The Sisters had been able to raise $1.3 million by that date. The cost was valued at the time to be $4.5 million. On June 2, 1978, it was announced that the Sisters had purchased the building of the Carmelite Order located at 4200 Harewood Road NE. The renovation and construction of the additional building was scheduled for 1979.

=== A New Life for the Building ===
It became the National Children's Museum from 1979 to 2004. On January 22, 1990, First Lady Barbara Bush visited the museum to read Three Billy Goats Gruff to a group of children as part of her Foundation for Family Literacy. It was purchased in 2005 by developer Jim Abdo to be redeveloped as a condominium complex under the name of Senate Square but by 2007, it had been converted to a luxury apartment complex under the same name. It was reported that former Mayor Anthony A. Williams was one of the first residents of the complex.

== Daily Life ==
In 1886, The Evening Star visited the Home and made a vivid description of the Home, the Sisters, its residents and their lives. The article starts with the Sister Superior explaining that the sisters would go door to door begging for money, food or anything that can be given to them. "The people of this country, as a rule, receive well. Do we get much from the rich? No; if we depended upon the rick I think our old people would starve. It is from the working people, the poorer people, we get most. They always have ten cents for us or a loaf of bread. We never provide for more than one day. We have no funds at all, but depend upon what good people will give us."

It goes on to describe the Home itself where the 200 residents lived. From the corridors, sitting rooms to the dormitories were clean and tidy. The dormitories were filled with cots all with a feather bed on top and covered with snow-white counterpanes and home-made patch quilts made by some of the residents. The dormitories were locked during the day to avoid residents simply going to bed on their own if they felt unwell. If they needed to lay down, a sister would open the door to let them in and checking on them for possible signs of illness.

The Home, while it accepted all poor people regardless of creed or race, remained segregated by race and sex. A wing was reserved for white women, one for white men, one for black women and one for black men. The women were seen sitting, knitting, talking in groups or simply rocking on their rocking chairs. For those who were in poorer health, the infirmary was where they would stay. Several sitting rooms offered shelter when the weather were used for reading, talking and playing cards on long tables. All the residents wore donated clothes.

A room was reserved as a smoking room, where the residents "addicted to the use of tobacco can smoke and chew too". it was noted that the Sisters also begged for tobacco as they did for food and clothing for the residents. On the main floor was also a apothecary shop or dispensary with jars and bottles of drugs. "We beg these things too. We compound the medicines ourselves. We have to learn how to do that."

The chapel erected a few year before was further down with a gallery on the same level as the infirmary allowing the sick to join the worship. A service was conducted every morning by Father Schleuter. Near by was a sewing room where some of the residents were stitching and assembling clothes. Shelves stored supplies of cloths and garments which had been washed and put away. These clothes came from donations as well as from some of the residents who had brought what they had with them.

In total, sixteen sisters lived and cared for the Home with no other employees on site. Four Sisters would go out every day to beg. Two would beg for money to pay for the expenses. Two would go out twice a day with the wagon to ask for food and money from the residential areas as well as stores and some hotels. The remaining Sisters would stay at the Home to care for the residents including wash, dress and put them to bed.

It ends on these words from the French Sister Superior: "Yes we meet with some rebuffs when we ask for charity but what of that? We must not care. We have two purses. We take the rebuffs, the humiliation for ourselves; the rest is for the poor".

By the 1940s, the Sisters had established a yard with grape arbors and fruit trees including a golden plum tree. It is where many residents took walks and rested in the shade looking back on their lives surrounded by the brick wall. Only the noises of the railroad next door and the sirens of fire engines were able to come in.

On November 23, 1954, the Sisters received a custom built truck from the Knights of Columbus. It was given to them during the 27th Annual Open House sponsored by the Knights. 2000 visitors came to visit the Home.

== Saint Joseph's Day ==
Saint Joseph is the Saint patron of the order of the Little Sisters of the Poor. Every year, on March 19, the sisters would celebrate the day with a feast for the residents of the Home. It was the only day, outside of Sundays when the Sisters would not go out to beg. Instead, they would stay at home and enjoy the company of the residents. Some years, the event would have to be pushed back as March 19 would fall in Holy Week. This was the case in 1894 when it was celebrated on April 4. The lunch was served around noon and was followed with a performance by the residents usually including music and dancing ending in the early afternoon.

Starting around that same year, the Sisters started inviting the people who were giving to them to serve the poor at the feast. It was also a time for the donors to visit the Home. It appears members of the French Embassy in Washington, D.C., started joining the lunch around the same time and it became a tradition. In 1895, the French Ambassador himself, Jules Patenôtre des Noyers and the chancellor of the embassy, M. Boeufre were present. The order had strong ties with France having been founded by a French Sister, Jeanne Jugan and having its headquarters in Saint-Pern, France.

In 1895, The Washington Times gives a detailed description of the meal: "The Lenten regulations were relaxed to allow the use of meat, and the dinner consisted of a soup, a roast, several vegetables, with cake and ice cream for dessert. Most of the inmates were able to site at the table, but those who were confined to the infirm wards were given extra dainties."

In 1898, the new French Ambassador Jules Cambon was part of the celebration assisted by the chancellor of the embassy, M. Boeufre. Many members of the Diplomatic corps including Giovan Battista Pioda II, Ambassador of Switzerland and his wife and the ex-Queen Liliʻuokalani were also present and serving the residents. The meal for the 250 residents was served at 12:30 and ended with music and other festivities.

== Deaths ==
Being a home for elderly residents, death was a common sight at the Home for the Aged. However, there were some notable deaths of residents.

Mrs. Hilliz had died on Saturday April 20, 1878, in the night. Her body had been shrouded and prepared for burial. On Sunday, the Sisters were watching by the bier when suddenly, while looking at the pale face, signs of life where visible. A few moment later, Mrs. Hilliz who had thought to be dead, arose. The Sisters were frightened by the sight. Mrs. Hilliz simply said: "I am not dead yet, but I will die soon". After recovering from their fright, the sisters undressed the resident and put her back to bed. She recovered her conscienceless. She died again on the following Wednesday. The "resurrection" had attracted much attention from the local medical community. Understandably, the body was not buried immediately after this incident.

Sophia Grammler was a resident of the Home. On Monday, October 5, 1885, she left the home to go visit her grand children on Marion Street. The Baltimore and Ohio Railroad was running down Delaware Ave NE at the time before turning on I Street NE, right behind the Home. The resident had been gone for only fifteen minutes, when crossing the tracks on Delaware Avenue NE, she was hit by the engine of train no.10 and thrown at a distance of ten to twelve feet. She was taken back to the Home where she was examined by a doctor. The crash had inflicted a broken rib and several bruises. She died at noon that same day. The coroner performed an inquest in this crash and reported on October 7. The jury had listened to several witnesses. According to Robert Nelson, he was working near when he saw the victim in the middle of H Street as the train was coming. The steam chest or cylinder struck her at the hip and she fell. The train immediately stopped and the conductor helped her up with the assistance of a pedestrian present. Another witness, Michael Hill, reported that the victim seems to have walked into the train tracks. By all accounts, the gate was down. The gate had no arms and it appeared that she had walked around it and had not seen the train coming. The conductor stated that he had seen her getting extremely close and had rung the bell to alert her to the danger but with no success. The jury concluded that the lack of barriers around the tracks was to blame for the fatality.

== See also ==
- Little Sisters of the Poor
- Swampoodle
- H Street NE
