= Atlas District =

Coordinates: 38°54′0.8″N 76°59′15.7″W

A map of Washington, D.C., with the Atlas District highlighted in maroon.

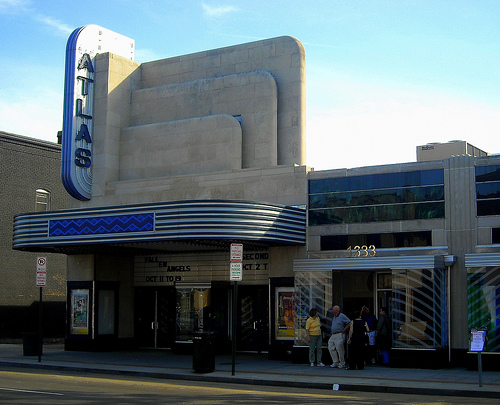
Atlas Performing Arts Center on H Street, NE

The Atlas District (also known as the Atlas or the H Street Corridor) is an arts and entertainment district located in the Near Northeast neighborhood of Washington, DC. The neighborhood is located to the east of Washington Union Station.

== Name and definition ==
The name "Atlas District" is not historical, and was part of a neighborhood branding campaign built around the revitalized Atlas Theater. The theater was originally built in 1938 and converted into the Atlas Performing Arts Center in 2001

=== Geography ===
It runs along the resurgent H Street from the outskirts of Union Station to the crossroads with Fifteenth Street, Bladensburg Road, and Florida Avenue (also known as the "Starburst Intersection").

== History ==
The area suffered economic setbacks after the riots following Martin Luther King Jr.’s 1968 assassination.

=== 21st century ===
The area has benefited from the economic resurgence that has affected most of the district since the turn of the 21st century. The neighborhood began a resurgence after Joe Englert announced plans in 2005 to transform this three block area with various bars and music venues. Examples of bars that he opened were: the Pug; the Red and Black; the Rock N Roll Hotel; the Bee Hive; the Olympic, a sports bar with pool tables; Dr. Granville Moore's Brickyard; and the Showbar.

In 2012, the district was named as one of the "hippest" neighborhoods in the country by Forbes magazine. In 2023, neighborhood property agent Christopher Dixon argued that despite the neighborhood's resurgence in the early 21st century, neighboring "Union Market and [NoMa] came in here and just kind of stole our thunder".

== Transit ==
The area is served by the D2X and D20 Metrobuses. The district is not served by the Washington Metro rail, with the closest Metro station being located in Union Station, on the Red Line.

== Notable sites ==
=== Atlas Performing Arts Center ===
The Atlas Performing Arts Center (formerly the Atlas Theater), the modern neighborhood's namesake, is located on H Street, NE and was . The marquee and external appearance of the original movie theater were preserved, but the inside was completed replaced. The building now houses rehearsal and performance space for local performing arts groups, including the Capital City Symphony.
