= H Street (Washington, D.C.) =

Set of streets in the United States

H Street Northwest and Northeast
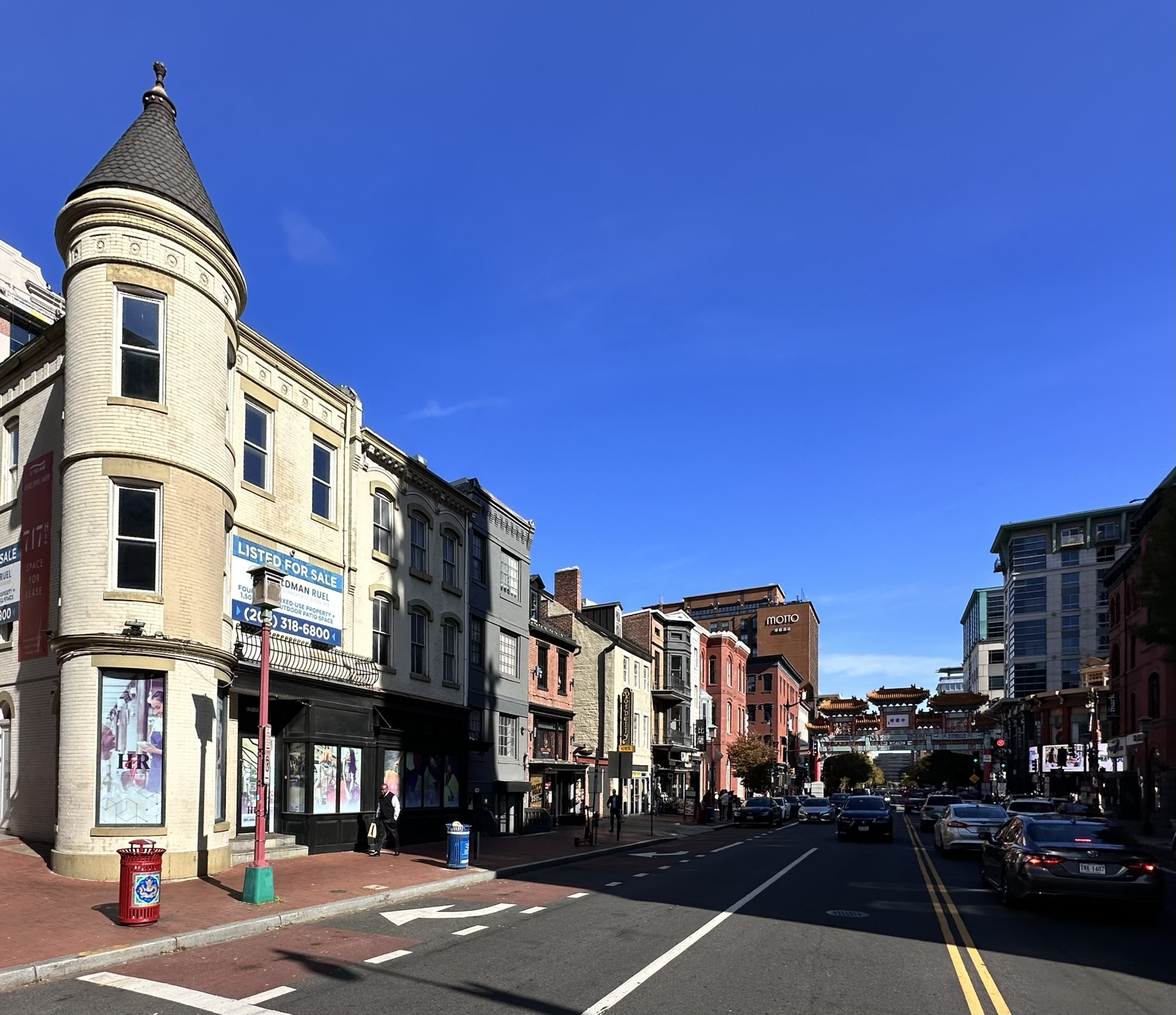
- The 700 block of H Street NW in Chinatown. Constructed in the 19th century, the buildings are designated as contributing properties to the Downtown Historic District.
- Interactive map of H Street Northwest and Northeast
- Maintained by: DDOT
- Length: 3.8 mi (6.1 km)
- Location: Northwest and Northeast, Washington, D.C., U.S.
- Coordinates: 38°54′0.7″N 77°0′32.4″W
- West end: New Hampshire Avenue in Foggy Bottom
- Major junctions: Pennsylvania Avenue in Downtown; New York Avenue in Penn Quarter; US 1 / US 50 (6th Street) in Penn Quarter; Massachusetts Avenue in Judiciary Square; North Capitol Street in NoMa
- East end: US 1 Alt. / Florida Avenue / Benning Road at Starburst Plaza
- North: I Street
- South: G Street

Construction
- Commissioned: 1791

H Street is a set of east–west streets in several of the quadrants of Washington, D.C. It is also used as an alternate name for the Near Northeast neighborhood, as H Street NW/NE is the neighborhood's main commercial strip.

== History ==
In the 19th century, H Street around North Capitol was the center of a small settlement called Swampoodle which became an entire neighborhood by the 1850s. It played an important role in the construction of Washington, D.C. by providing the workforce needed to build projects such as Union Station.

H Street was separated in two with the railway track where it intersected with Delaware Avenue when Union Station started to be built in 1907. This split created distinct neighborhoods east and west of the railway which have grown independently. In 1902, it was originally planned that H street NE would be cut for 600 feet (180 m) at Delaware Avenue. Thanks to involvement of the Northeast Washington Citizens' Association, the plan was changed to having a 750-foot (230 m) tunnel built to retain the connection between the two sides of the track.

The H Street NE/NW neighborhood was one of Washington's earliest and busiest commercial districts, and was the location of the first Sears Roebuck store in Washington. H Street NE went into decline after World War II and businesses in the corridor were severely damaged during the 1968 riots. This part of the street did not start to recover until the 21st century.

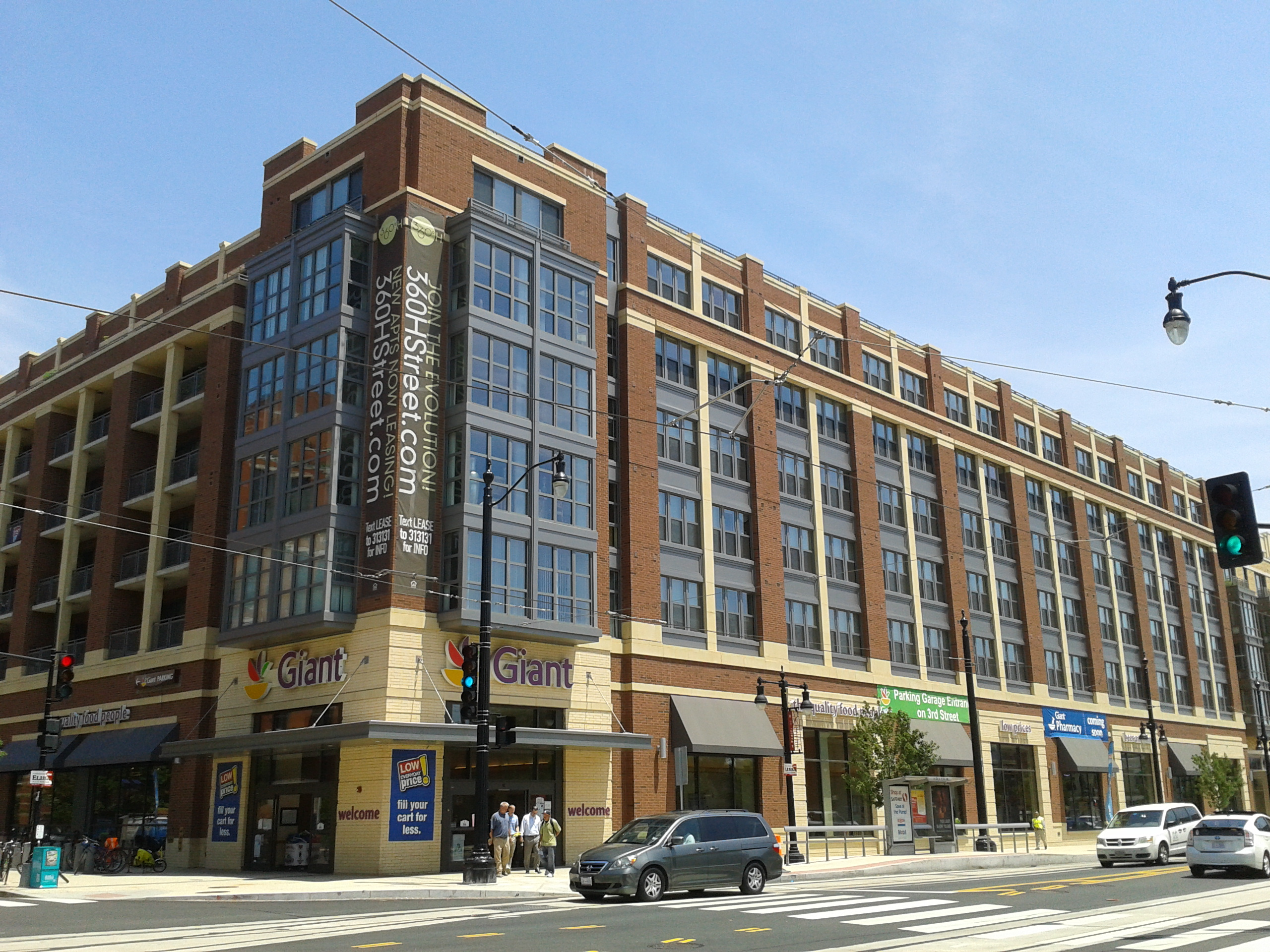
A Giant supermarket along the H Street corridor

In 2002, the District of Columbia Office of Planning initiated a community-based planning effort to help revitalize the H Street NE corridor. Because it is nearly 1.5 miles (2.4 km) long, the resulting H Street NE Strategic Strategic Development Plan divided H Street into three districts: the Urban Living district (between 2nd and 7th Streets NE), the Central Retail District (between 7th and 12th Streets NE), and the Arts and Entertainment District (between 12th and 15th Streets NE).

In the mid-2000s, the Arts and Entertainment District began to revitalize as a nightlife district. The Atlas Theater, a Moderne-style 1930s movie theater that had languished since the 1968 riots—was refurbished as a dance studio and performance space where Mosaic Theater Company of DC and Step Afrika! are in residence, and is now the anchor of what is now being called the Atlas District.

H Street NE rapidly re-developed after 2007. The same forces that led to the redevelopment of the neighboring NoMa neighborhood acted on the H St NE neighborhood The median sales price of houses on or near H Street NW from July to September 2009 was $417,000. H Street NE was voted the sixth-most hipster place in America by Forbes magazine in September 2012. This process of gentrification led to tensions with some previous residents, who felt that they were becoming less welcome as the neighborhood changed and worried about being priced out.

As H Street NE continued to develop, its annual neighborhood festival, the H St Festival has grown into the largest neighborhood celebration in the city. It is often chronicled in DC news outlets such as these articles from 2008 2010 2016 2017 2018 2019.

H Street NE is also home to the country's first American Sign Language friendly Starbucks location on the 600 block of H St NE due to its location in the vicinity of Gallaudet University.

== Route ==
=== H Street NW ===
In Northwest Washington, H Street is the main street in Chinatown and one of the major east-west streets downtown. When Pennsylvania Avenue in front of the White House was closed to vehicular traffic in the 1990s, crosstown traffic that had formerly used Pennsylvania Avenue was rerouted to H and I streets. The street also passes Lafayette Park and through the George Washington University campus and the Foggy Bottom neighborhood before terminating at Rock Creek.

=== H Street NE ===
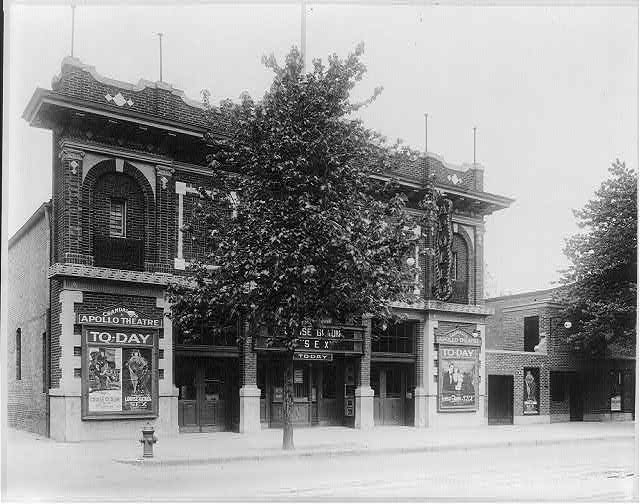
The Apollo Theater in 1920

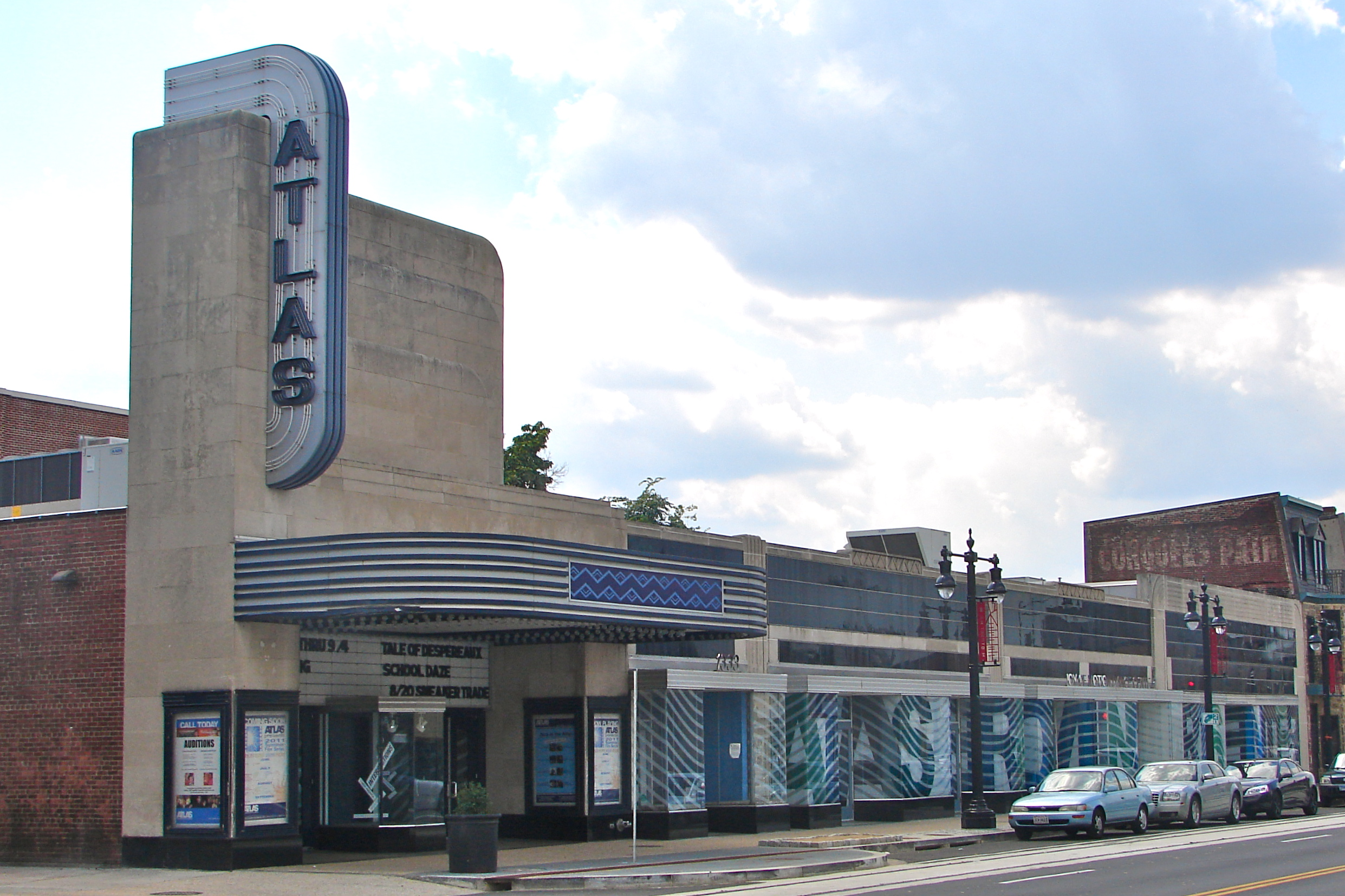
The Atlas Theater

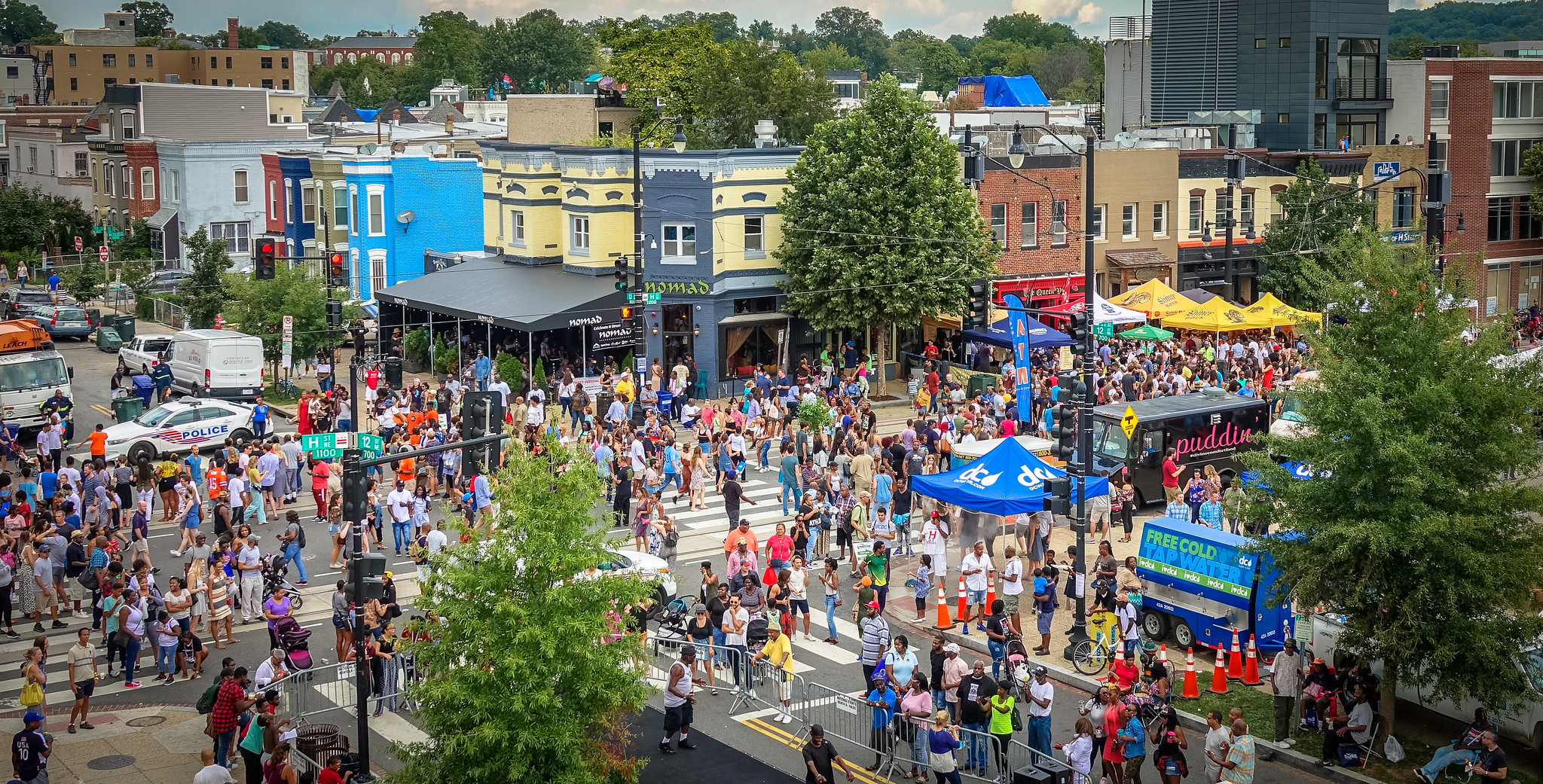
The H Street festival in 2017

In Northeast Washington, H Street continues uninterrupted from North Capitol Street (crossing over train tracks just north of Union Station on the "Hopscotch Bridge") to 15th Street NE, where it terminates in what is known as the "starburst intersection", where it meets Bladensburg Road, 15th Street, Benning Road, Maryland Avenue, and Florida Avenue.

After this intersection, there is a gap of two blocks where the street is interrupted by Hechinger Mall. (Note: This is the site of the old Graceland Cemetery, which was closed on August 3, 1894, and finally emptied of graves in November 1897. The site was owned by Pepco for many years before being sold to the Hechinger Company in 1978. The mall was built in 1979.) H Street continues for a short segment between 17th and 24th Streets NE as part of the Carver Langston neighborhood. The road does not continue east of the Anacostia River.

The H Street Corridor is the part running from 2nd Street NE to Starburst Plaza and is also known as the Atlas District and Near Northeast. It includes the part north of H Street NE to Florida Ave NE and south to F Street NE. The second portion of H Street (after Starburst Plaza) is not considered part of the H Street Corridor.

Some of the significant buildings included:

- 1872: the Home for the Aged Men and Women on H Street NE between 2nd and 3rd Street NE.
- 1897: the Northeast Temple and Market at 1119-1123 H Street NE, an indoor marketplace and a Masonic Temple. The first buildings electrified on H Street NE. It was demolished and replaced by another smaller building.
- 1913: the Apollo Theater at 624-634 H Street NE. It was replaced by the Ourisman Chevrolet Service Center. Today, the "Apollo" building stands there.
- 1938: the Atlas Theater at 1313-33 H Street NE. A former movie theater repurposed as a Performing Art Center. This building was an important part in the revitalization of the neighborhood.

=== H Streets SW and SE ===
The city plan on which D.C. was laid out provides for a parallel H Street in the southwest and southeast quadrants of the city. Subsequent government actions, most notably the construction of I-395/I-295, disconnected the southern H Street in several places. In its current form, it does not run consecutively for more than two blocks at any point except for its easternmost extremity, near Fort Dupont Park.

== Notable residents ==
Notable residents who lived on H Street include:

- George B. McClellan, on the south side, between 4th and 5th Streets NW (now occupied by the Government Accountability Office)
- Phil Radford, Greenpeace Executive Director
- Mary Surratt, near the southwest corner of Sixth Street NW
- Anthony A. Williams, D.C. mayor from 1999 to 2007
- Elizabeth Schuyler Hamilton, wife of Alexander Hamilton
- Jewel Lewis-Hall, owner of the famous Michael Jackson house

== Bibliography ==
- United States Congress (1895). The Statutes at Large of the United States of America From August, 1893, to March, 1895, and Recent Treaties, Conventions, and Executive Proclamations. Volume 28. Washington, D.C.: Government Printing Office.
