= Northeast Temple and Market Company =

Northeast Temple and Market
- Location: 38°53′59.6″N 76°59′26.2″W
- Opening date: 1897
- Developer: Dr. B. Z. Babbitt and Arthur Cowell
- Management: Northeast Temple and Market Company
- Interactive map of Northeast Temple and Market

The Northeast Temple and Market Company was a building complex located on the Southwest corner of H Street NE and 12th NE in Washington, DC. It housed a covered farmer's market at the corner as well as a Temple where local lodges met and organized events starting in 1897.

== Location ==
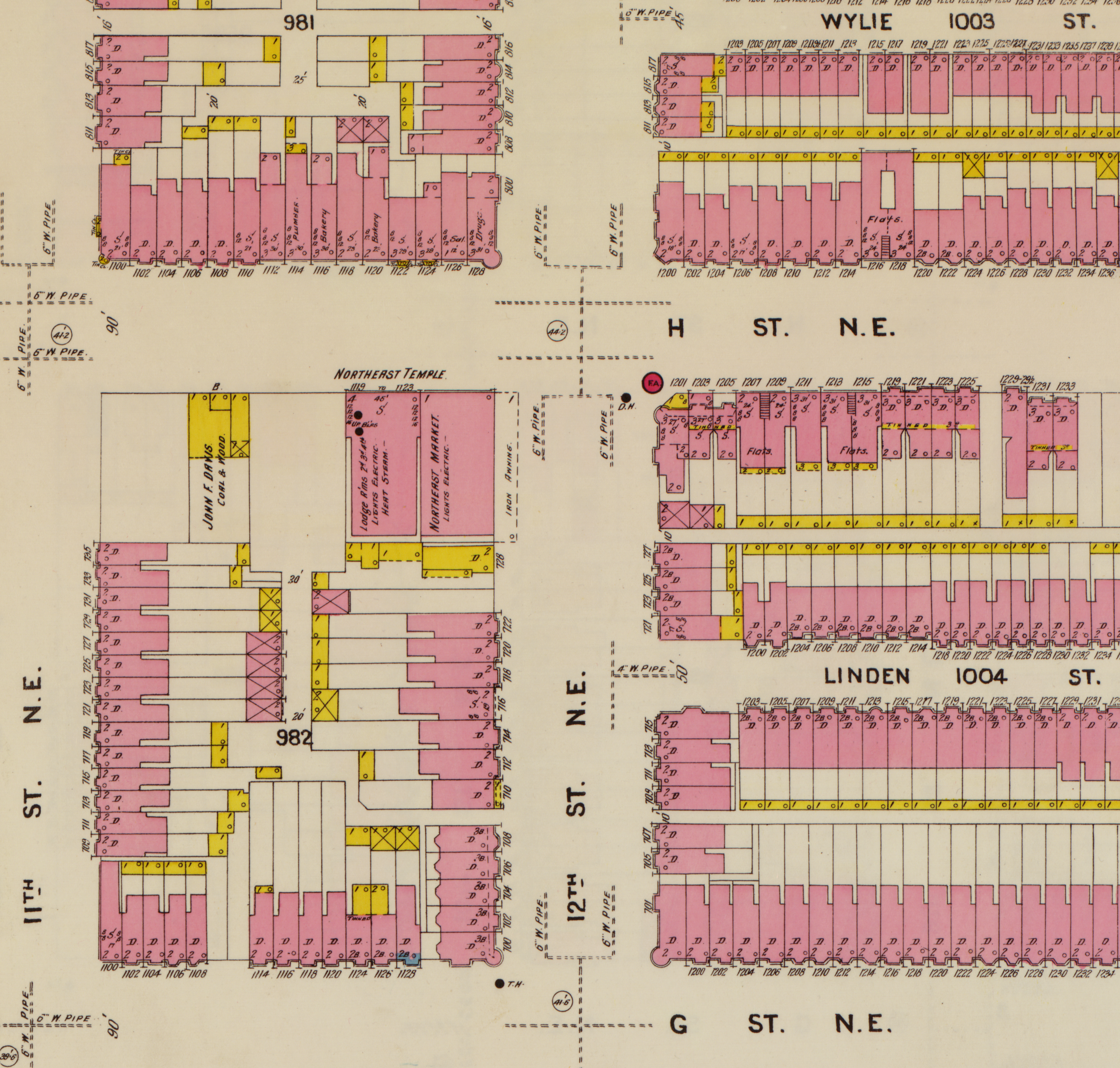
The Northeast Temple and the Northeast Market on a Sanborn map of 1903-1916

The Northeast Temple and Market Company owned two buildings on the 1100 block of H Street NE. The Northeast Temple was located at 1119-1123 H Street NE and the Market was located next door from 1125 H Street NE to the corner of 12th Street NE. The promoters of this enterprise were Dr. B. Z. Babbitt, a physician and Arthur Cowell, a brickwork contractor responsible for several large contracts in the District of Columbia. On May 7, 1897, Dr. Babbitt purchased Lot 9 on Square 982 (the same lot as where the buildings stood) on behalf of the trust.

Both buildings were the first buildings in the Northeast section of the city to light by electricity in 1897. A special wire was pulled over 11 blocks from North Capitol Street for that sole purpose.

== The Northeast Market ==
The Northeast Market opened to the public on March 20, 1897. When it opened, it had a frontage of 50 feet on H street Ne and 100 feet on 12th Street NE. The market accommodated the 50 stalls used by various farmers, butchers, bakers and other producers. Each stall-holder was a stock-owner in the market property. An iron awning protected the produces as well as the customers from the sun along 12th Street NE.

When it opened in 1897, the market operated Tuesdays, Thursdays and Saturdays. But by 1899, the market was open six days a week: Monday through Friday 5 AM to 1 PM and Saturdays 5 AM to 10:30 PM.

This is how it described itself in a 1916 ad:

"The ideal place at which to market, not only because of the considerable cash savings it is possible to accomplish, not only because it does away with the necessity for a tiresome trip down town, but also because of its absolute cleanliness in every particular. No dark corners here to breed filth and contamination everything is just as clean and as sanitary as it appears to be!"

== The Northeast Temple ==
The Northeast Temple opened a week before the Market in March 1897. On March 16, 1897, the Myron M. Parker Lodge, No. 27, FAAM, dedicated the new hall in presence of many Masonic members. The ceremony was performed by Grand Master Matthew Trimble. After the visit of the hall, a social event took place with refreshments and music. The same day, the Idaho Tribe, No. 15, Red Men was instituted in the Temple in the presence of prominent members of the order and a delegation from the Idaho Tribe, No. 73 of Philadelphia, PA.

The building (50 feet wide and 95 feet deep) was four stories height and faced with terra cotta bricks. On the first floor, two large department stores shared the space. On the second floor, a 40 by 75 feet assembly hall outfitted with a dance floor was used for entertainment. It was decorated with frescoes and pictures of Masonic emblems. On the third floor, a large lodge room was used by multiple organizations as their headquarters. The rest of the building was occupied by various offices.

It was a gathering place for many of the fraternities and other societies popular in the late 19th and early 20th century in America. In 1897, there were 21 lodges holding there meeting in the Northeast Temple. Each one of them owned stocks in the company. It was also used by associations such as neighborhood associations and veterans associations.

A frequent association using the hall was the Northeast Washington Citizens' Association starting with a reception which was held on the evening of April 12, 1897. John W. Ross, President of the Board of District Commissioners and Dr. Edward M. Gallaudet addressed the audience. Evan H. Tucker, President of the Association addressed the audience to present the organization as well as explain the uniqueness of being a citizen in a city without representation. In 1901, the Association was one of the groups which fought against the construction of Union Station. On January 13, 1902, the representatives of Congress and the railroad managers met with the public during the Northeast Washington Citizens' Association and listened to the outrage of the public to this project and the threat of a lawsuit.

The first military association event in the hall took place later that year on Memorial Day. On May 31, 1897, the George H. Thomas Post, No. 15 of the Grand Army of the Republic used the hall for their Memorial Day exercises with the George H. Thomas Camp, Sons of Union Veterans of the Civil War and the George H. Thomas Corps of the Woman's Relief Corps. This preceded them going to decorate the graves of veterans in the neighboring cemeteries of Glenwood, Prospect Hill, St. Mary’s, Mount Olivet and Graceland.

The Temple was also the place of worship for the Saint Paul's Protestant Church. On Sunday November 10, 1901 at 7:30, an open-air service was taking place with over 500 people in attendance right outside the building. A runaway horse which was attached to an open buggy dashed in the crowd injuring four people and bruising others. The sixteen year-old driver was not able to control the animal. The buggy turned over and the driver fell to the ground. The horse was finally controlled by several men. The four injured were transported to Casualty Hospital. On the way to the hospital, several victims cried "Glory to God!" and sang hymns in spite of the patrol wagon driver asking them to remain quiet.

Other groups that used the temple:

- Columbia Commandery, United Order of the Golden Cross
- The Royal Crescent
- Division No. 6, Ancient Order of Hibernians
- Northeast Washington Council, No. 755, Nation Union
- Amaranth Lodge, No. 28, Knights of Pythias
- Federal City Lodge, No. 20, Independent Order of Odd Fellows
- Friendship Lodge, No.11, International Organisation of Good Templars
- George H. Thomas Corps, No. 11, Woman's Relief Corps
- Capitol Circle, No. 315, Protected Home Circle
- District of Columbia branch of the National Holiness Association

On January 26, 1920, the Northeast Temple and Market Company building went on sale at public auction. The auctioneer was Adam W. Weschler.
