= National Children's Museum =

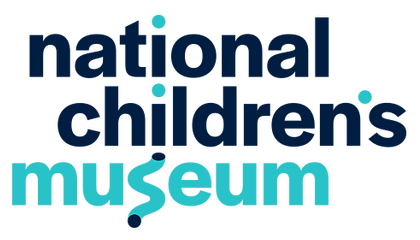

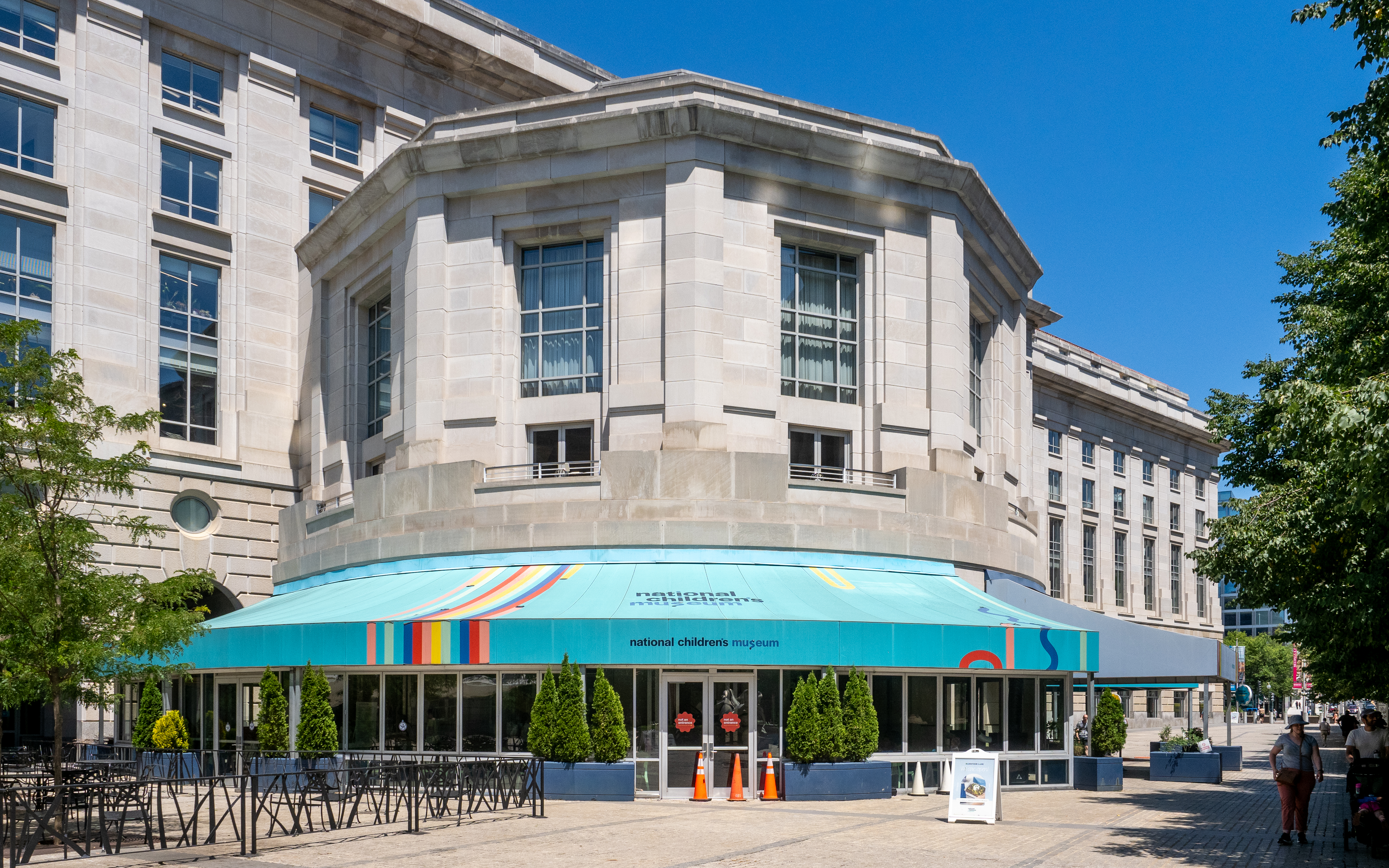
- (2024)

- Location within Central Washington, D.C.
- Former name: Capital Children's Museum
- Established: 1974
- Location: Ronald Reagan Building, Washington, D.C.
- Coordinates: 38°53′38″N 77°1′51″W
- Type: Children's museum
- Accreditation: AAM, ACM, ASTC
- Founder: Judith Grummon Nelson
- President: Kiryn Hoffman
- Chairperson: Robert M. Volmer
- Employees: 22
- Public transit access: Washington Metro at Federal Triangle
- Website: nationalchildrensmuseum.org

The National Children's Museum is a children's museum and science center in downtown Washington, D.C. It is intended to serve children up to age 12 and their families through interactive exhibits exploring science, technology, engineering, art, and math.

The museum aims to inspire children to care about and change the world. The museum received a U.S. Congressional designation in 2003 when Congress identified a need for a nationally recognized cultural and educational institution specifically for children.

Founded in 1974, the museum operated from 1979 to 2004 at 220 H Street, NE. It then operated as a "museum without walls" until 2009, when it opened a new location in National Harbor, Maryland. That closed in 2015. A new location opened on February 24, 2020, in the Ronald Reagan Building in downtown Washington, before temporarily closing due to the COVID-19 pandemic. The museum reopened on September 2, 2021.

== History ==
Judith Grummon Nelson founded the Capital Children's Museum in 1974. In 1979, the museum moved into a building at 220 H Street, NE, Washington, D.C., a former Little Sisters of the Poor home. The H Street location closed in August 2004.

From 2004 to 2012, National Children's Museum operated as a "museum without walls," forging partnerships with other organizations. The museum participated in a wide variety of events, which reached hundreds of thousands of children and families, including the White House Easter Egg Roll, the National Cherry Blossom Festival, and Nickelodeon's Worldwide Day of Play. Museum staff also conducted educational outreach activities in 14 states.

From 2009 to 2015, the museum was located in National Harbor, Maryland, first at the Launch Zone, a 2,700-square-foot space, and then in a more prominent location with exhibits such as "3 & Under" and "Our World." In November 2014, the museum's leadership announced that the institution would return to Washington, D.C.; the National Harbor location closed in January 2015.

=== Downtown location ===
After a long search for a new location, the museum's Board of Trustees identified an empty federal space adjacent to the Ronald Reagan Building in downtown Washington, DC, a short walk from the National Mall and the White House. The 30,000-square-foot space became the museum's new home. It was brought to life with modern exhibits that explore STEAM concepts, including early computer science skills, data literacy, the design thinking process, and environmental science.

Travel Channel listed the museum in its "10 Most Anticipated U.S. Museum Openings of 2019," and USA Today included it in its list of "Great New Museums for 2019."

This location was originally scheduled to open in March 2019. Its opening was delayed until November 1, 2019, and then again until February 24, 2020.
