= New Jersey Avenue Station =

Defunct train stop in Washington, DC

New Jersey Avenue
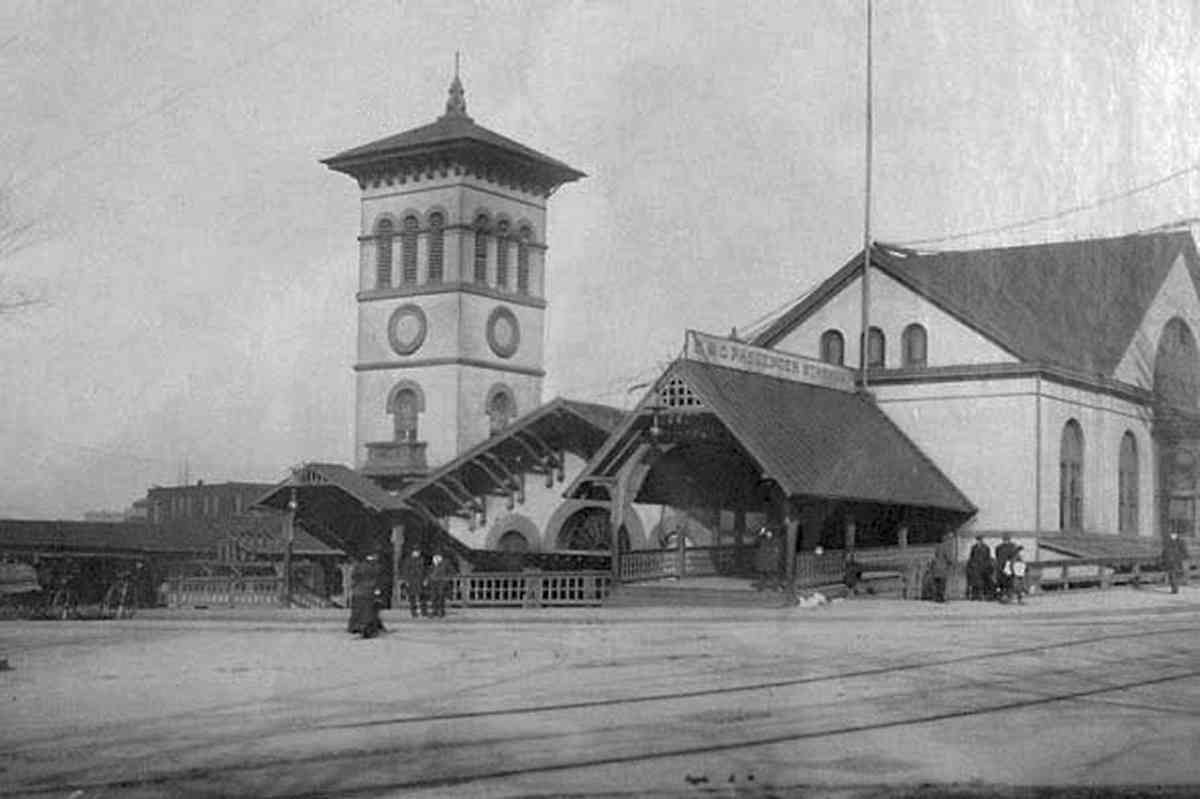
- The New Jersey Avenue Station in the late 19th century

General information
- Location: New Jersey Avenue and C Street, NW, Washington, D.C., U.S. United States
- Coordinates: 38°53′36.7″N 77°0′36.7″W
- System: Baltimore and Ohio Railroad
- Owner: Baltimore and Ohio Railroad
- Operator: Baltimore and Ohio Railroad
- Lines: Washington Branch (1851–1907); Metropolitan Branch (1873–1907)

Construction
- Structure type: At-grade

History
- Opened: April 9, 1851
- Closed: October 26, 1907 (lines moved to Washington Union Station)
Location
- Location within Washington, D.C.

The Washington Depot or New Jersey Avenue Station was a train station located in Northwest Washington, D.C., a block north of the Capitol. The train station was also called the B&O Depot as it was served by the Baltimore & Ohio Railroad. It operated from April 1851 until October 26, 1907, when Washington Union Station commenced operation.

During the American Civil War, the New Jersey Avenue Station was the major embarkation site for hundreds of thousands of Union troops. President Abraham Lincoln arrived there to be sworn in as President in 1861. It was from that station that his body along with his son "Willie" Lincoln began its long journey to his final resting place in Illinois after he was assassinated on April 14, 1865.

== History ==
=== Pennsylvania Avenue Depot ===
In 1831 the Maryland General Assembly authorized the B&O to build a branch from their main line within 8 miles (13 km) of Baltimore, to Washington, DC. It would be known as the Washington Branch. Construction began in July 1833, and the line opened on August 25, 1835, splitting from the B&O main line at Relay, roughly 7 miles (11 km) from Baltimore. The line originally ended at a Depot located at Pennsylvania Avenue NW & 2nd Street NW starting in 1835.

=== Construction ===
On May 31, 1850, the Washington Board of Aldermen and Common Council approved a resolution for the removal of the old B&O Depot from Pennsylvania Avenue NW & 2nd Street NW. This was the primary goal of the resolution.

Here are the conditions approved by the Council. The B&O Railway Company would have to:

- Select a site at any point along its current Washington Branch of the railroad on the eastern side of New Jersey Avenue. They would dismantle the section between the old depot and the new depot and relinquish the use of the track.
- Build within twelve months a new depot on the selected location suitable for travel and fret on the line.
- Pay eight thousand dollars within sixty days to improve C and D Streets NW and North Capitol Street. Any surplus would be used to improve New Jersey Avenue between C and D Street north.
- Pay within sixty days the taxes due on the property (with the exception the road and the cars and engines used upon it) the Railway Company owns in the city.

In exchange, the City Council would grant the B&O Railway Company the right to use steam-propelling cars on the line in the City of Washington on the current line for up to thirty years as it had done previously all the way into the depot. The resolution was signed by Silas H. Hill (President of the Board of Common Council), Walter Lenox (President of the Board of Aldermen) and William W. Seaton (Mayor).

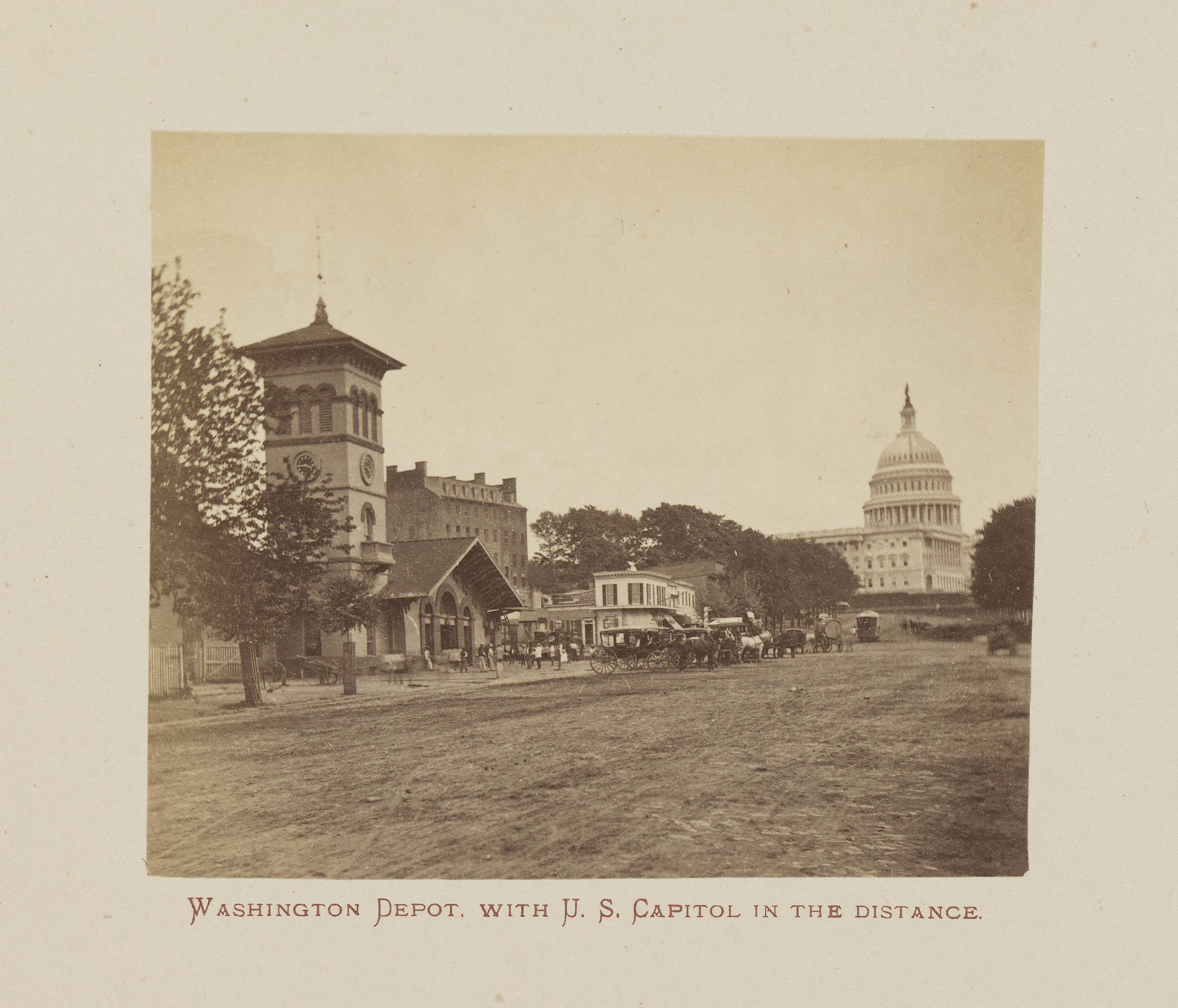
The Washington Depot in 1872 with the Capitol in the background

The resolution was accepted by the railway company and announced on June 22, 1850. The exact location of the depot would end up being at the intersection of New Jersey Avenue and C Street NW.

=== Beginning Service ===
On April 7, 1851, the Railway Company announced that the Pennsylvania Avenue Station would be vacated and that all trains would instead to the New Jersey Avenue Station starting on April 9, 1851. At that time, the B&O was transporting about 150,000 passengers a year between Washington and Baltimore and employing six steam locomotives on the Baltimore-D.C. line.

On March 2, 1857, President-Elect James Buchanan arrived at five o'clock in Washington through the New Jersey Avenue Station, just two days before his inauguration. He was accompanied by his niece, Harriet Lane (who acted as First Lady of the United States during his presidency) and other members of his family. Vice President-Elect John C. Breckinridge and his wife also arrived on the same train from Baltimore.

=== Abraham Lincoln ===
On February 23, 1861, President-elect Abraham Lincoln arrived at the New Jersey Avenue station from Baltimore for his inauguration as President as his predecessor had done. He had evaded a possible assassination plot in Baltimore which had been uncovered by Lincoln's head of security, Allan Pinkerton. While the city was on high alert with substantial military guard, an added layer of protection was added and he arrived in disguise.

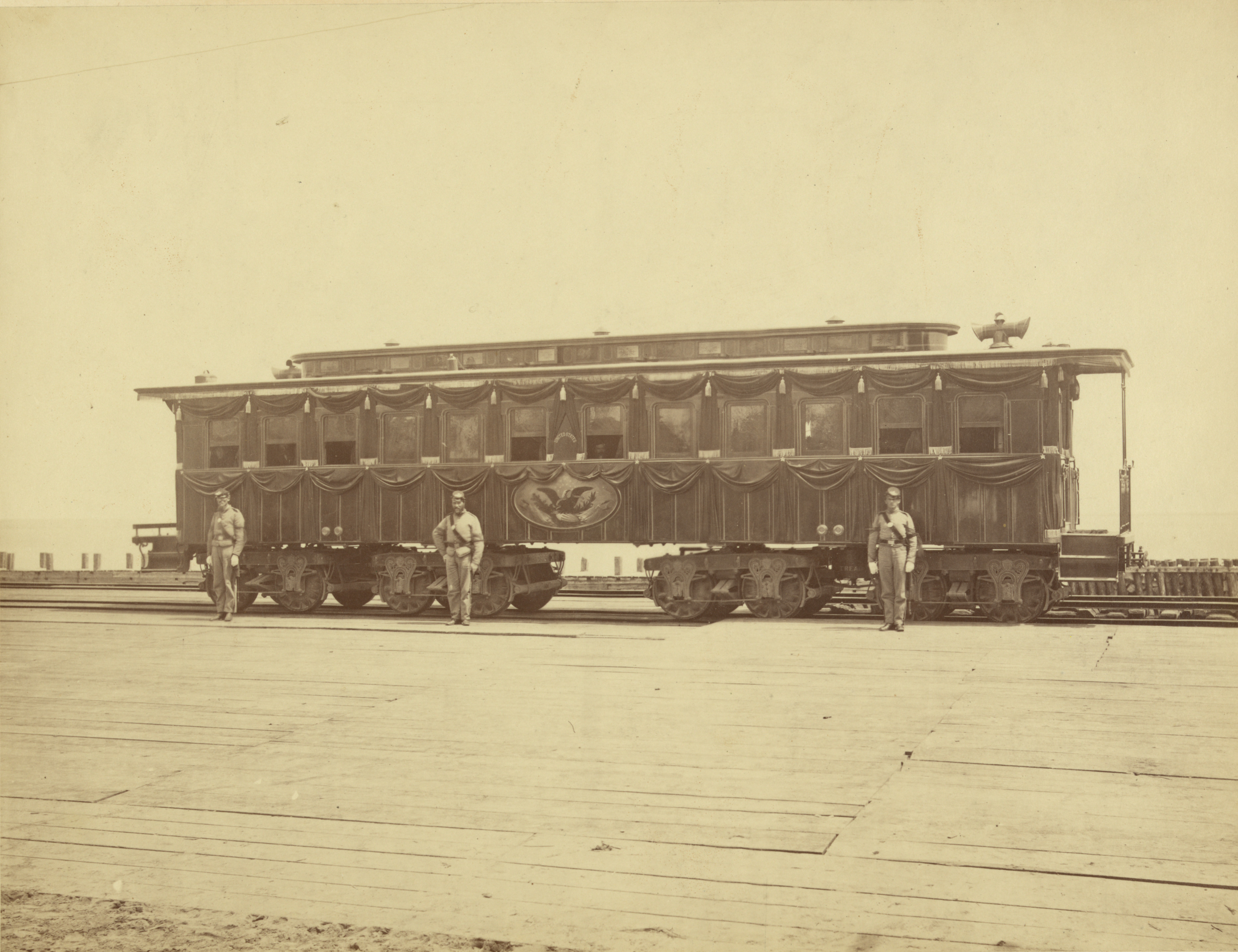
The Funeral Car

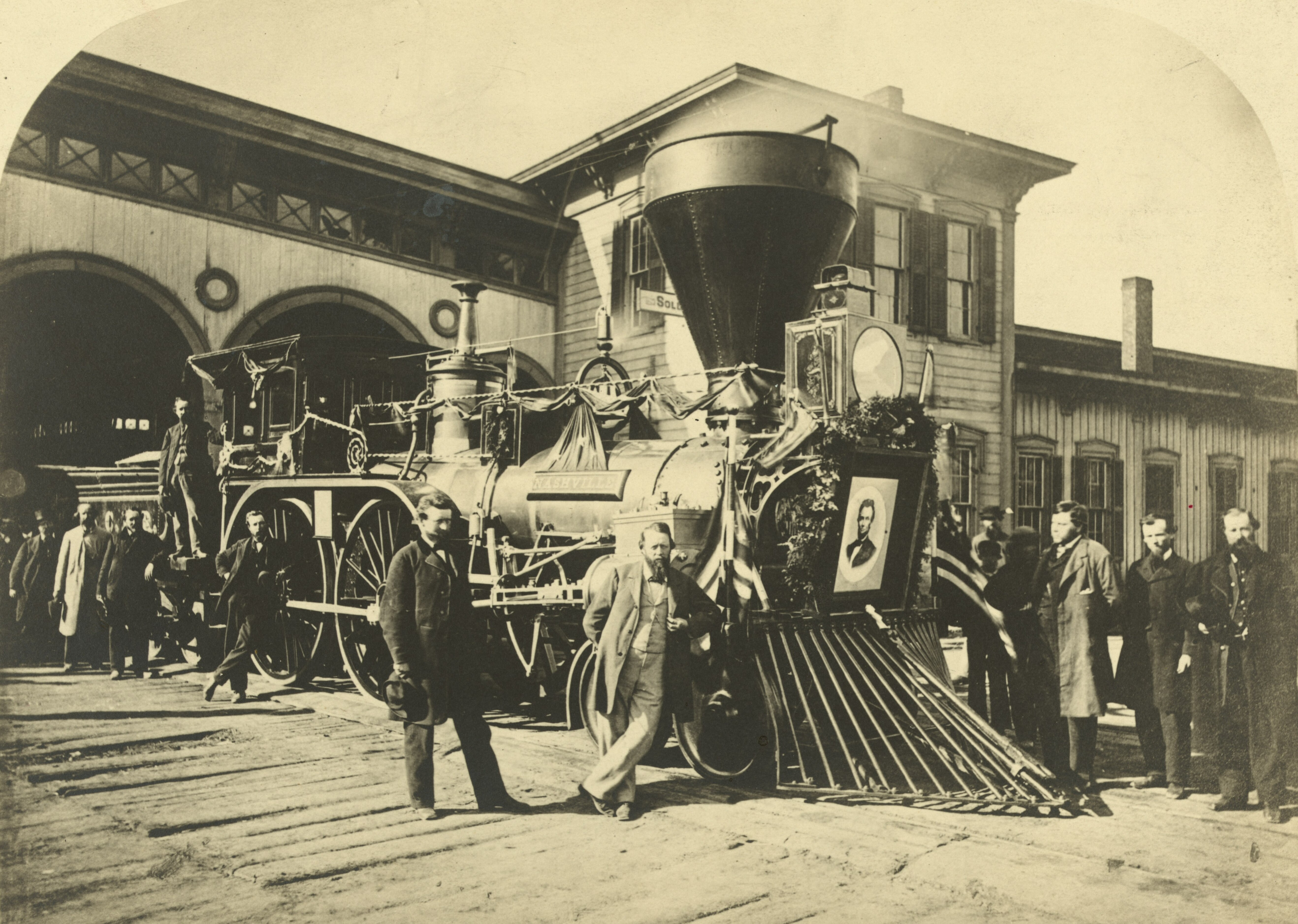
One of the two engines used in the funeral train

On April 14, 1865, (Good Friday) President Lincoln was assassinated by John Wilkes Booth while attending a play at Ford's Theater as the American Civil War was drawing to a close. Five days earlier, Robert E. Lee and the Confederate Army of Northern Virginia had surrendered. Andrew Johnson was sworn in soon after his death as Washington and soon after the country was in mourning. The late President lay in state in the East Room, and then in the Capitol Rotunda starting on April 19. It was estimated at the time that close to 40,000 people had come to pay their respects at the time.

On April 21 at about six o'clock in the morning, the members of the Cabinet, a delegation from Illinois, the pall bearers along with several officers of the Army and the Senators gathered in the Rotunda for a final farewell. The casket was then loaded onto a hearse under a guard of honor made up of the companies of Captains Cromee, Bush, Hillebrand and Dillon and from the 12th Regiment of the Veteran Reserve Corps, under the command of Lieut. Col. Dell. From there it was transferred to the Washington Depot followed by the members of Cabinet and a procession.

The casket was placed on the next to last car. This car was built for the US Military Railway for the President and other dignitaries. The usual a parlor, a sitting room and sleeping apartment was robed in black and the windows were also draped in black.

His son Willie Lincoln had died at age 11 years on February 20, 1862, and had been interred in Oak Hill Cemetery in Georgetown. On April 20, 1865, his body was removed from its metallic burial case and transferred into a silver mounted black walnut coffin. The next day, the casket was brought to the Depot. Both the father and son's caskets were placed on a platform draped in black before being placed in the same car.

A pilot locomotive (No. 239) was heavily draped in mourning with all the brass covered up. In the front, two big flags were fringed in mourning with four smaller ones on the engine. At 7:50 am, the engine was started and all the passengers got on board the train. The pulling locomotive (No. 238) draped in the same way as the pilot locomotive, gave the signal at 8:00 am with a slow bell toll with other engines in the depot also tolling their bells. The funeral train left the Washington Depot for Baltimore, Maryland, its first stop in a journey which would finally lead them to Springfield, Illinois.

=== Metropolitan Branch ===
In 1866, the B&O started the construction of the Metropolitan Branch. This would be the second line coming out of the New Jersey Avenue Depot. however it would not be completed until 1873 after years of erratic effort. Prior to this new line, travels had to take the train to Relay or Baltimore before getting on the main line. The service of this line would continue until it was moved to Union Station in 1907.

=== Closure ===
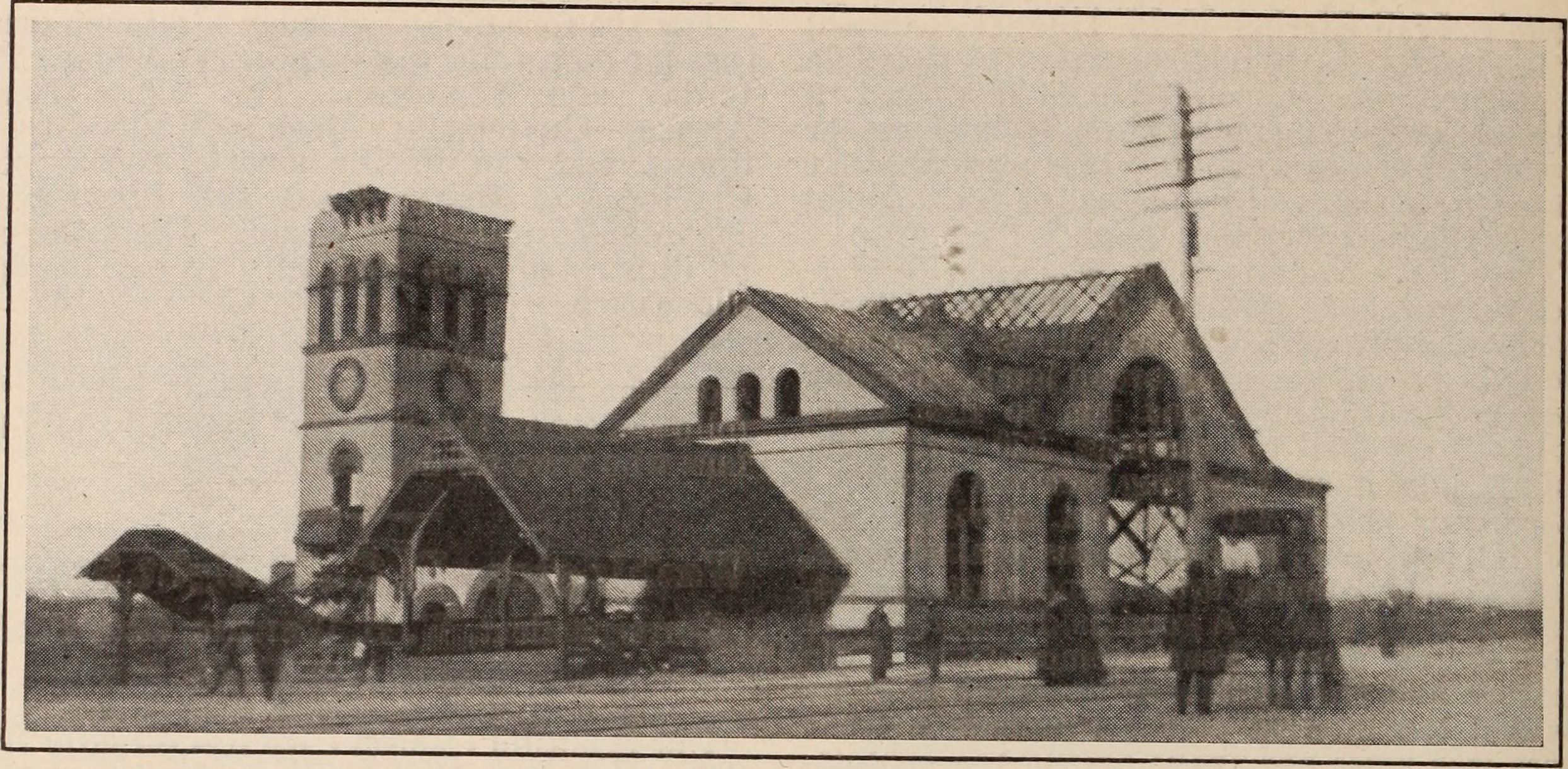
The station in the process of being demolished in 1908

In 1907, both the New Jersey Avenue Depot and the Baltimore and Potomac Railroad Station which was located on the National Mall at B Street NW and 6th Street NW shut down to relocate to the newly built Washington Union Station. The B&O Railway decided to start running trains from Union Station as of October 26, 1907, while the Pennsylvania Railway set itself a deadline of November 16, 1907.

== Description ==
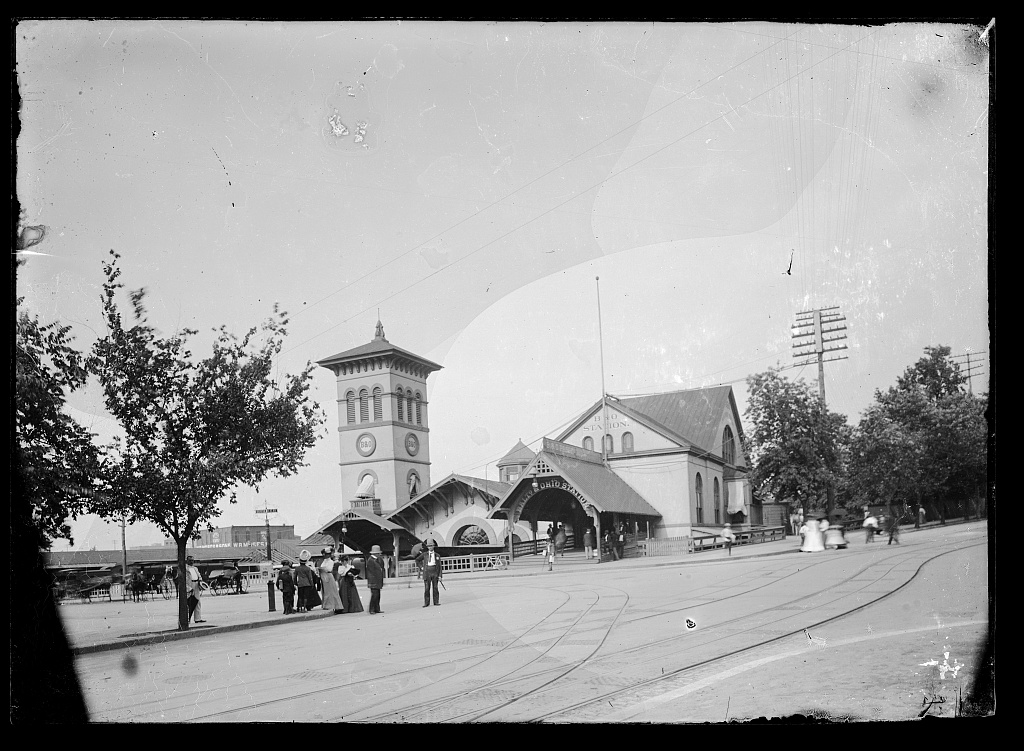
New Jersey Ave Station - West entrance (C Street and New Jersey Ave NW) in 1901

The 106-foot (32 m) tall front of the Italianate-style railway depot located on Capitol Hill was dominated by a four-sided clock tower that rose 100 feet (30 m). The station was 68 feet (21 m) deep, according to the Baltimore American. The inside of the station was a beautiful hall that passengers passed through to get to their trains. The station included a B&O ticket office, a freight office and ladies and gentlemen's saloons. Just to the north was the main carhouse, which was 60 feet (18 m) wide and 330 feet (100 m) in length; its iron roof was supported by granite pillars.

Passenger services include all Baltimore & Ohio service in and out of Washington. In the beginning, passengers traveled to Baltimore, and there they could connect to the rest of the B&O destinations from Newark, New Jersey, to Chicago, Illinois. In 1873, the Metropolitan Branch was completed and service from the New Jersey Avenue Station directly to the Midwest was inaugurated.

== Evolution of the Lines ==
Here is the evolution of the B&O lines over time from the first depot on Pennsylvania Avenue in 1835 to the consolidation of all railways in Washington Union Station in 1907.

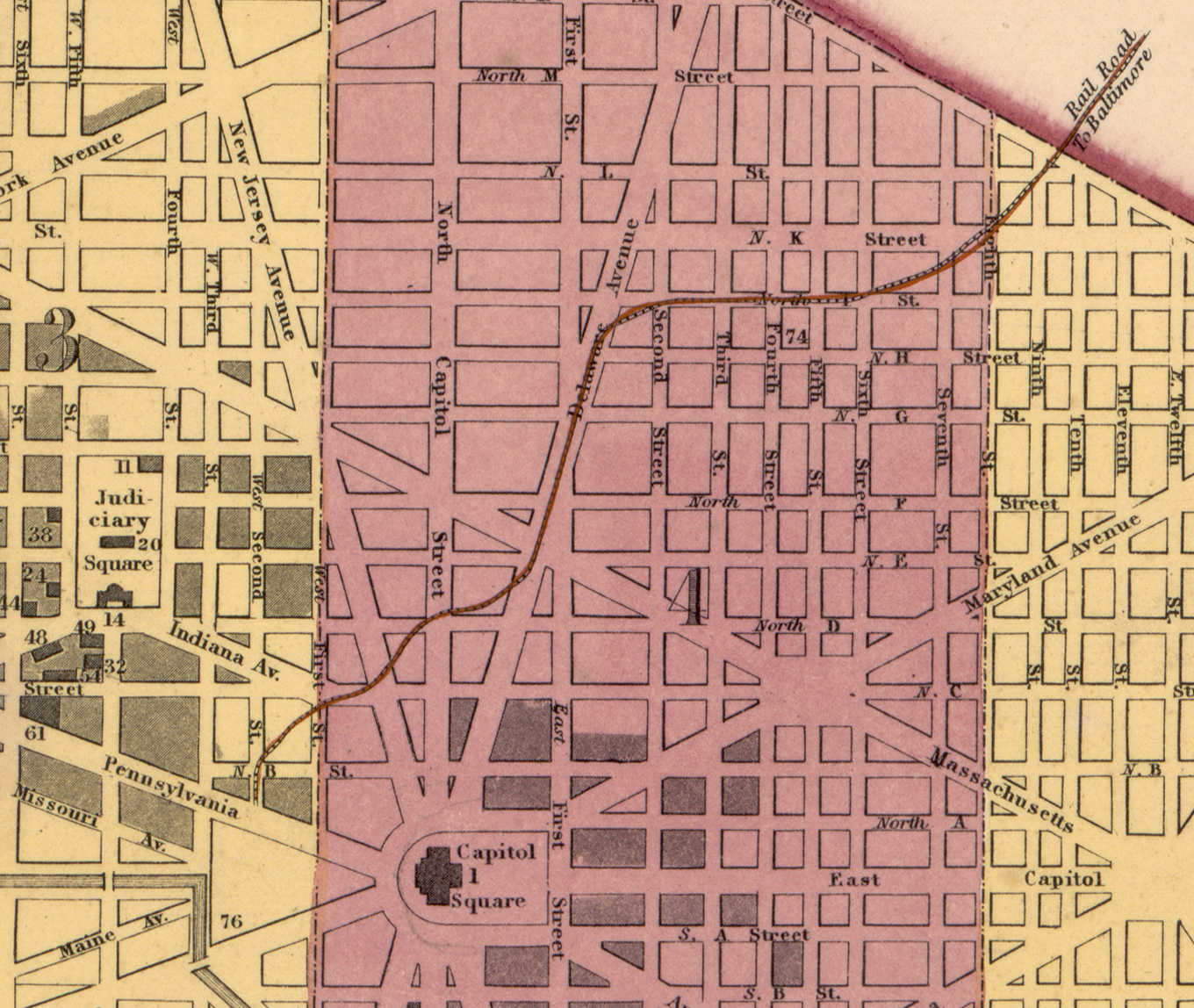
1835–1851

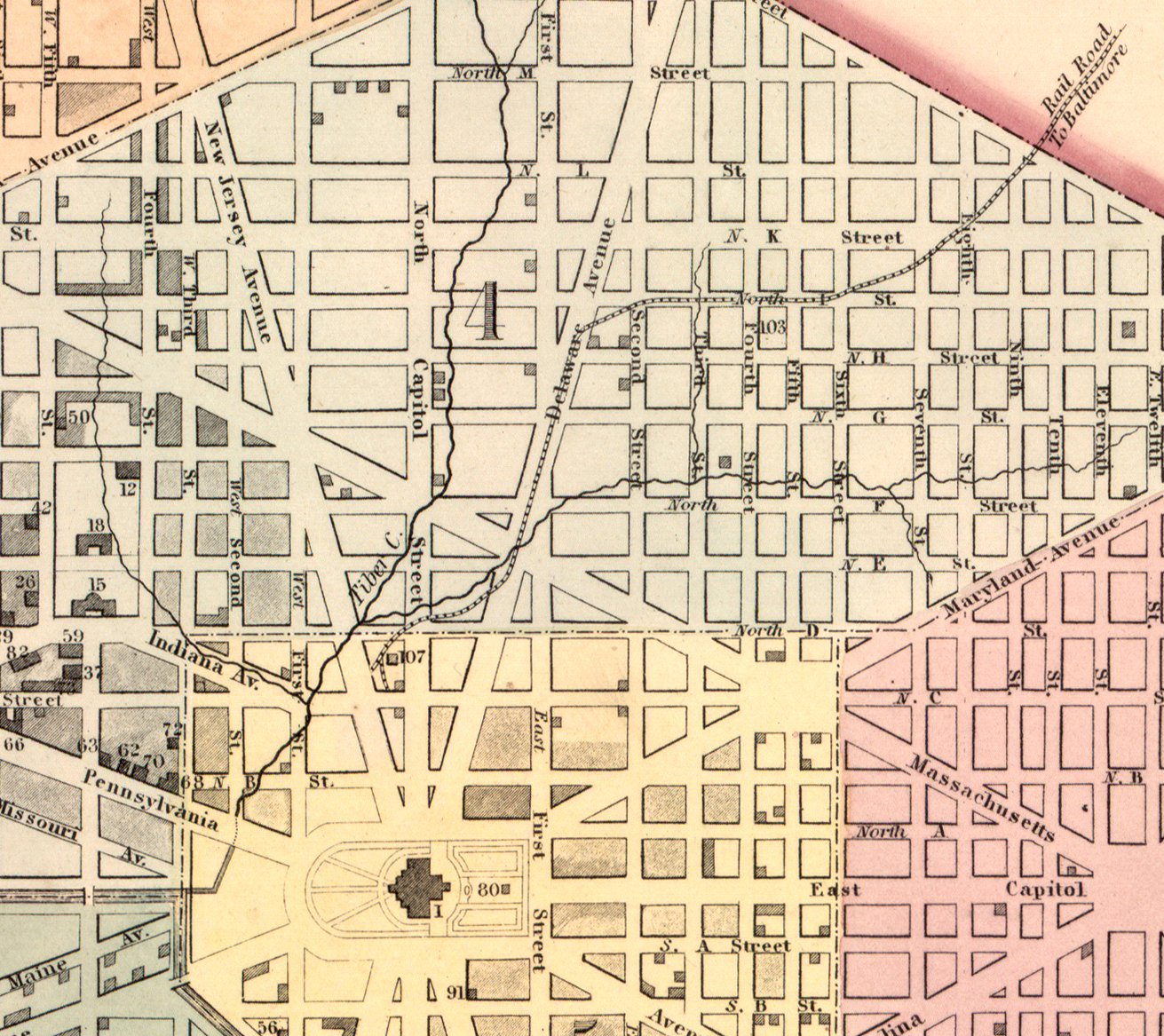
1851–1873

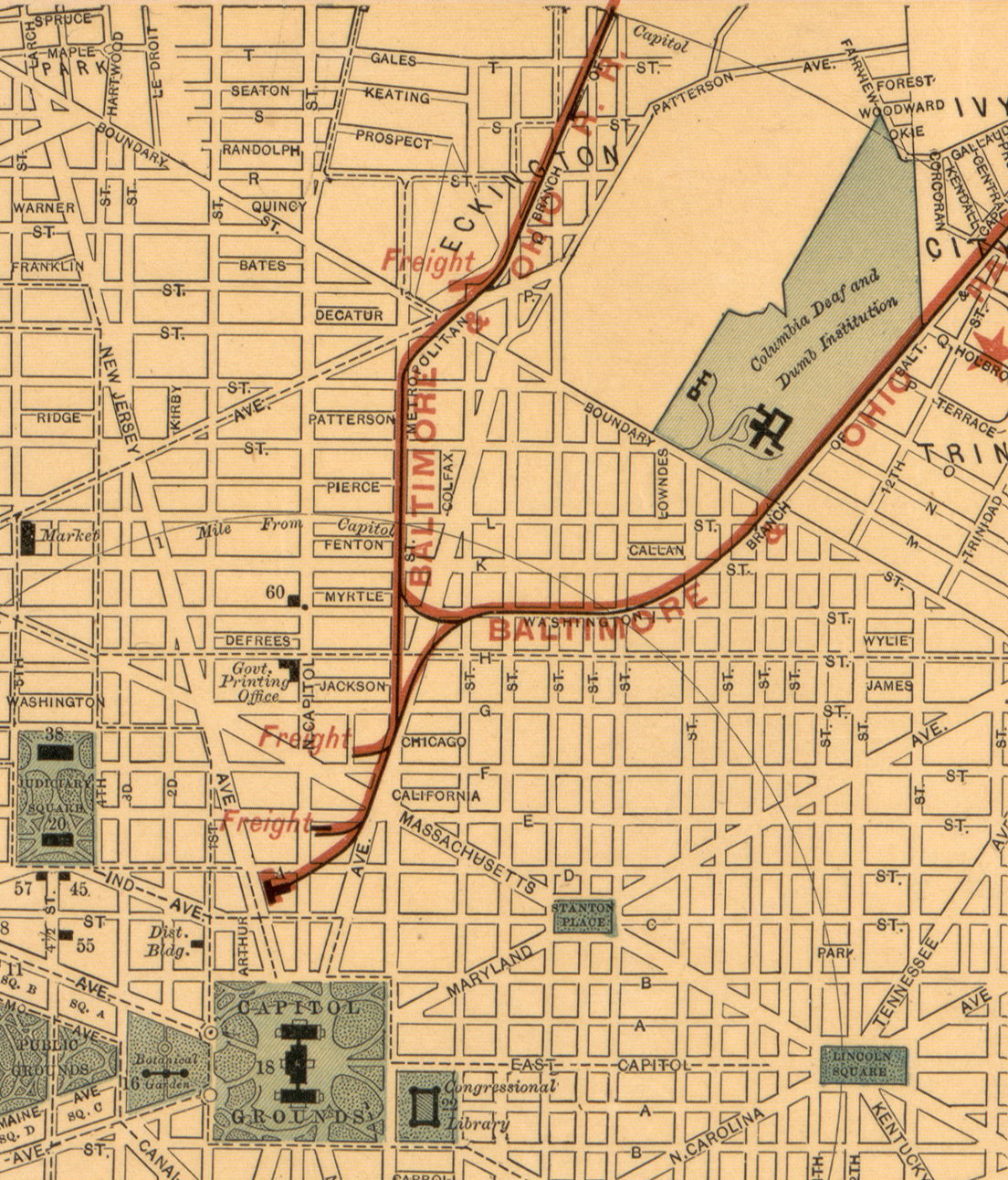
1873–1907

== See also ==
- Assassination of Abraham Lincoln
- Baltimore Plot
- Capital Subdivision
- Funeral and burial of Abraham Lincoln
- Metropolitan Subdivision
- Washington Union Station
