= American League Park (disambiguation) =

American League Park may refer to:

== United States ==
=== Baseball parks ===
- American League Park (Baltimore), renamed Oriole Park
- American League Park (Washington, D.C.):

- American League Park (1901–1903)
- American League Park (demolished 1911), alternatively known as Boundary Field
- American League Park (1911–1965), later renamed to Griffith Stadium

- American League Park (New York City), commonly known as Hilltop Park

== See also ==
- League Park (disambiguation)
- National League Park (disambiguation)
