= List of state-named roadways in Washington, D.C. =

State-Named Roadways
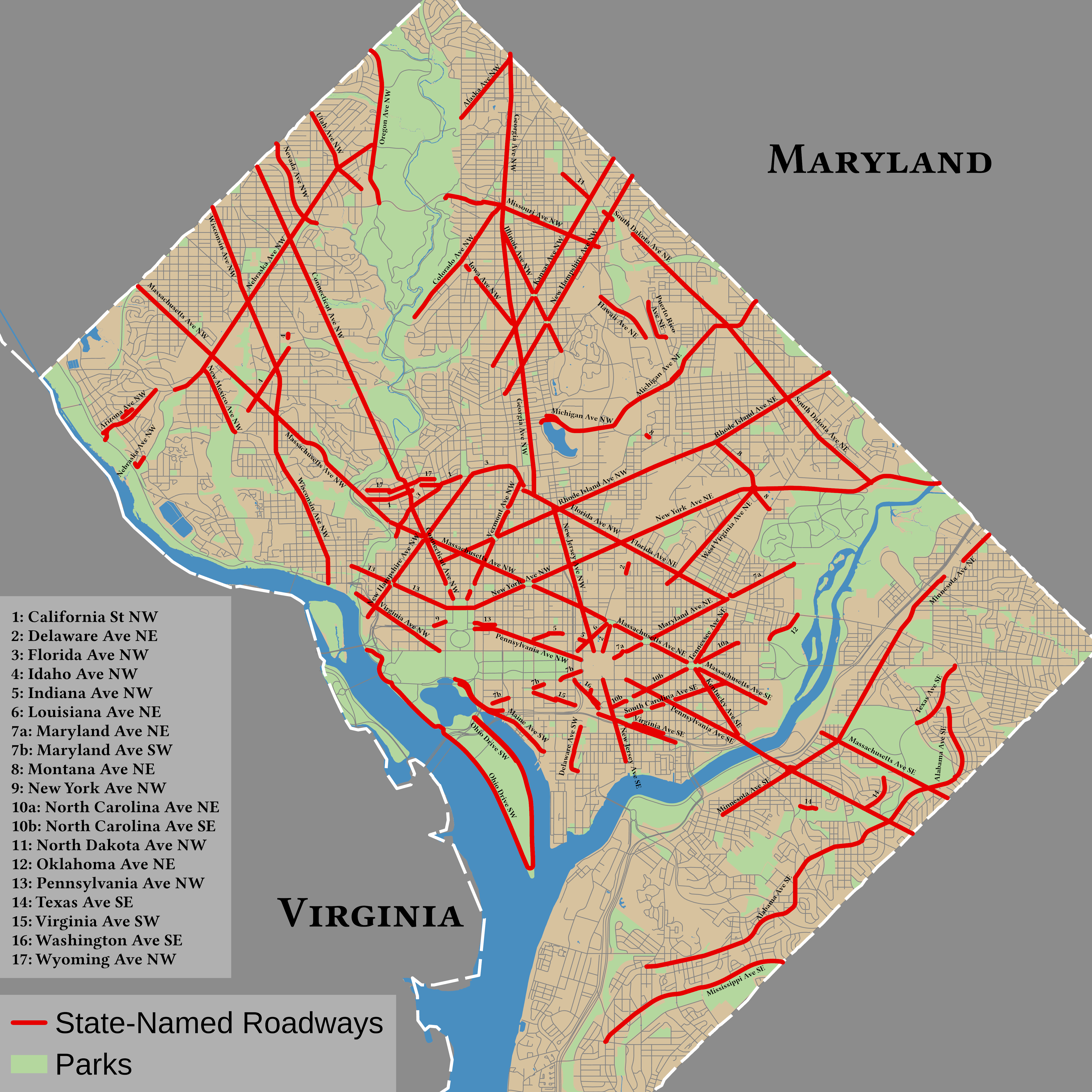
- Streets named after states are in red

Street names
- North–south streets: Numbered
- East–west streets: Lettered, then alphabetical naming
- Diagonal avenues: U.S. states and Puerto Rico

System links
- Streets and Highways of Washington, DC; Interstate; US; DC; State-Named Streets

As the capital of the United States, Washington, D.C. has 51 roadways which are named after each state and the territory of Puerto Rico. Many of these roadways are major avenues that serve as the city's principal traffic arteries. Every state-named roadway is an avenue except for California Street and Ohio Drive.

== Organization ==
While streets in Washington, D.C. are generally laid out in a grid pattern, the state-named avenues often form diagonal connections between the city's many traffic circles and squares as envisioned in the L'Enfant Plan for the city. However, avenues named for Arizona, Hawaii, Mississippi, Oklahoma and Puerto Rico connect to no other state-named roadways. Avenues named for Connecticut, Georgia, Massachusetts, New Hampshire, New York, Pennsylvania, Rhode Island, and Wisconsin continue into neighboring Maryland, often as state highways, but none of the state-named avenues continue into Virginia. Most avenues exist in one or two quadrants, except for Massachusetts and Virginia Avenues, which travel through three of the four quadrants; it is geometrically impossible for a straight street to exist in all four quadrants, though they exist in multiple sections.

== List ==
Name	Quadrant(s)	Details	Total length (in the District)
Alabama Avenue	SE	Part-primary road and part-residential street which runs from Martin Luther King Jr. Avenue in Congress Heights to E Street in Benning Ridge, following a winding path.	5.0 mi (8.0 km)
Alaska Avenue	NW	Secondary road runs from 16th Street to Kalmia Road and Georgia Avenue in Shepherd Park, built in 1911.	0.8 mi (1.3 km)
Arizona Avenue	NW	Secondary road that runs from Canal to Loughboro Roads in Kent. One of four state-named roadways that does not connect to another state-named roadway. In 1947, Senator Carl Hayden proposed to build a four-lane divided highway called Arizona Avenue through the Glover-Archbold Park, from Canal Street in Georgetown to Wisconsin Avenue in Friendship Heights. Hayden's proposed highway was not built; the path is now the Glover-Archbold Trail and the Massachusetts-39th Trail. Instead Weaver Street and Weaver Place were renamed Arizona Avenue in 1954 after a suggestion by the American University Park Citizens' Association.	0.9 mi (1.4 km)
Arkansas Avenue	NW	Secondary road that runs from 16th Street to Georgia Avenue / Gallatin Street, running along the border in Petworth and Sixteenth Street Heights.	1.0 mi (1.6 km)
California Street	NW	Residential street in Kalorama and Embassy Row. The main segment runs from Massachusetts Avenue to Columbia Road, but another short segment runs from 19th Street to Florida Avenue, one block east from the main segment. The longer street was originally T Street until it was renamed in 1901. The shorter segment was originally V Street until it was renamed in 1911. There used to be a California Avenue located in Burleith.	0.7 mi (1.1 km)
Colorado Avenue	NW	Residential street that runs from a cul-de-sac in Crestwood to Georgia and Missouri Avenues in Brightwood.	1.6 mi (2.6 km)
Connecticut Avenue	NW	Arterial street that runs from K Street in Downtown Washington to Chevy Chase Circle, continuing north as Maryland State Route 185. The road runs for one block between H and I Streets, between Farragut and Lafayette Square.	5.0 mi (8.0 km)
Delaware Avenue	SW, NE	Residential street that is one of the four avenues centered on the Capitol. The street has several intermittent segments: one runs in from Canal to H Streets in Southwest Waterfront. Another section in the same neighborhood exists for one block from Washington Avenue to C Street in front of the Rayburn House Office Building. A stretch north of the Capitol exists between Constitution Avenue and Columbus Circle. The trajectory is occupied by Northeast Corridor and Red Line tracks, except for one block between L and M Streets.	0.9 mi (1.4 km)
Florida Avenue	NW, NE	Major street in that was originally known as Boundary Street, the northern boundary of Pierre L'Enfant's original plan for the Federal City. In 1890, the city expanded beyond the borders of the original plan, and the street was renamed. The road runs from an intersection with Massachusetts Avenue and 22nd and Q Streets in Embassy Row along a winding path due to the city's topography, until 9th Street where the road follows a straight trajectory. The road terminates at an intersection with H Street NE near the Starburst Plaza intersection in Trinidad.	4.0 mi (6.4 km)
Georgia Avenue	NW	A major north–south artery that carries U.S. Route 29 in the District of Columbia and continues outside the District as Maryland State Route 97. Georgia Avenue begins in Columbia Heights north of Florida Avenue NW, which was the boundary of the Old City and is a continuation of 7th Street NW. Traveling northward, the street passes Howard University and Fort Stevens into Montgomery County, Maryland, where it carries. The total length of the road is about 24 miles (39 km), of which 5 miles (8.0 km) are in Washington, D.C. Georgia Avenue was originally named 7th Street Extended, and later Brightwood Avenue, before receiving its present name. Prior to this, Potomac Avenue in Southeast Washington was called Georgia Avenue.	5 miles (8.0 km)
Hawaii Avenue	NE	Residential street in Fort Totten. Runs from North Capitol Street to Taylor Street NE along the athletic fields at The Catholic University of America. One of four state-named roadways that does not connect to another state-named roadway. Built in 1939, after a request from then-territorial delegate Samuel W. King.	0.6 miles (0.97 km)
Idaho Avenue	NW	Residential street in McLean Gardens. Runs from Cathedral Avenue to Rodman Street. There is also a discontinuous dead-end Idaho Avenue off of Tilden Street.	0.8 miles (1.3 km)
Illinois Avenue	NW	Street in Petworth. Begins at Rock Creek Church Road, passes through Grant and Sherman Circles, and ends at Georgia Avenue and Longfellow Street.	1.5 miles (2.4 km)
Indiana Avenue	NW	Street in Judiciary Square. Runs from 7th Street to 3rd Street. Previously ran from 12th Street, but portions were obliterated by the Federal Triangle complex. This street was originally named Louisiana Avenue. The original Indiana Avenue ran from 3rd Street to 1st Street and was demolished in the mid-1960s to construct the headquarters of the United States Department of Labor and the Center Leg Freeway. A short, noncontiguous portion of Indiana Avenue near the intersection of First Street and C Street is all that remains of the original route.	0.3 miles (0.48 km)
Iowa Avenue	NW	Street in Sixteenth Street Heights. Runs from 14th and Emerson Streets to Georgia Avenue and Varnum Street. There is also a nearby stretch from Piney Branch Road to Gallatin Road near 16th Street.	0.6 miles (0.97 km)
Kansas Avenue	NW, NE	A key thoroughfare that runs from through Petworth. It begins at Eastern Avenue, then crosses Blair Road. Later it crosses Missouri Avenue before meeting Sherman Circle, where Crittenden Street, Illinois Avenue, and 7th Street intersect. It crosses Georgia Avenue, where it exits the Petworth neighborhood. After crossing 13th Street it ends at Spring Road, right near the northern part of Columbia Heights. It runs parallel to New Hampshire Avenue.	2.6 miles (4.2 km)
Kentucky Avenue	SE	A street that begins at East Capitol Street SE in Lincoln Park to Barney Circle near Pennsylvania Avenue and I-695 to RFK Stadium.	0.8 miles (1.3 km)
Louisiana Avenue	NW, NE	The northern counterpart to Washington Avenue. Though only a few blocks from the capitol, was not in L’Enfant's original plan. Runs from 2nd Street and Constitution Avenue to Columbus Circle. In the 19th century, much of present-day Indiana Avenue was named Louisiana Avenue.	0.4 miles (0.64 km)
Maine Avenue	SW	A diagonal avenue that begins Independence Avenue and 17th Street, runs along the Southwest Waterfront, has an interchange with Interstate 395, and ends at 6th and M Streets.	1.2 miles (1.9 km)
Maryland Avenue	SW, NE	Along with Delaware, Pennsylvania, and New Jersey Avenues, Maryland Avenue is one of four avenues centered on the U.S. Capitol. It exists in several intermittent sections, including one running from 12th Street SW one block in a cul-de-sac in a development built over railroad tracks, from 7th to 1st Streets SW, in front of the Capitol, and as a major street running from 1st Street NE through Capitol Hill and the Starburst Intersection to Carver Langston. The portion from Constitution Avenue NE to Bladensburg Road NE once carried U.S. 1. There are plans to make the section along the railroad tracks continuous within the Federal Center Southwest neighborhood. Until 1992, an entrance to the National Arboretum existed at the easternmost terminus of Maryland Avenue.	2.8 miles (4.5 km)
Massachusetts Avenue	SE, NE, NW	Major traffic-carrying artery. One of only two avenues in the District to go through three of the four quadrants and only state-named roadway to touch two of the District's borders. The largest segment begins at 19th Street SE in the Hill East neighborhood, passes through many of the major circles and squares in Washington and runs along Embassy Row, before leaving Washington at Westmoreland Circle, where it continues into Maryland as Maryland State Route 396. This main segment runs 8.4 miles in Washington and an additional 2.3 miles in Maryland. A smaller segment (1.6 miles) runs east of the Anacostia River from 30th Street in Greenway to Southern Avenue.	10 miles (16 km)
Michigan Avenue	NW, NE	Major street that begins at Warder Street near the McMillan Reservoir, winds its way through the Brookland neighborhood past various hospitals and colleges, ending at Eastern Avenue in the Michigan Park neighborhood, where it becomes Queens Chapel Road (Maryland State Route 500). Formerly named Bunker Hill Road, after nearby Fort Bunker Hill.	2.8 miles (4.5 km)
Minnesota Avenue	SE, NE	Major street that begins at Marion Berry Avenue in Anacostia, runs parallel to the Anacostia River and the Anacostia Freeway, and ends at Sheriff and Benning Roads in Deanwood. A shorter segment (0.4 miles) exists near the Deanwood Metro station.	3.5 miles (5.6 km)
Mississippi Avenue	SE	Street that runs from South Capitol Street in Congress Heights to Southern Avenue in Oxon Run Park, generally parallel to Alabama Avenue. One of four state-named roadways that does not connect to another state-named roadway. Before 1908, it was named Hamilton Road.	2.4 miles (3.9 km)
Missouri Avenue	NW	Street that runs from Military Road and 14th Street in Brightwood to North Capitol Street and Riggs Road in Petworth. Until 1937, it was named Concord Avenue. In the mid-19th century, Missouri Avenue was located near the Capitol Building.	1.4 miles (2.3 km)
Montana Avenue	NE	Street in Langdon that runs from Rhode Island Avenue to Bladensburg Road. There is also a discontinuous dead-end Montana Avenue off of Franklin Street, between 5th and 6th streets.	1 mile (1.6 km)
Nebraska Avenue	NW	A thoroughfare that runs from Oregon Avenue in Chevy Chase, passes several circles and American University, and transitions to Loughboro Road at an intersection with Chain Bridge Road. Named Chain Bridge Road until 1906. A short non-contiguous section, which lies southwest of the main route of Nebraska Avenue extends off MacArthur Boulevard NW and connects with Sherier Place NW.	3.5 miles (5.6 km)
Nevada Avenue	NW	Street in Chevy Chase that winds from Western Avenue to Broad Branch Road.	1 mile (1.6 km)
New Hampshire Avenue	NW	Street in Northwest Washington. Begins at F St NW in Foggy Bottom outside the Kennedy Center and continues to 15th Street NW and Florida Avenue NW in Columbia Heights. A second section, parallel to Kansas Avenue, runs from Park Road NW in Columbia Heights to Eastern Avenue NE in Lamond Riggs, where it continues as Maryland State Route 650. The southern section is 1.9 miles, and the northern section has 2.8 miles in D.C. and an additional 20+ miles in Maryland.	4.7 miles (7.6 km)
New Jersey Avenue	SE, NW	Along with Delaware, Pennsylvania, and Maryland, one of four avenues centered on the U.S. Capitol. Segmented into two sections: one runs from Florida Avenue in Shaw, Washington, D.C. to Constitution Avenue outside the Capitol. The other runs between Independence Avenue and N Street near the Navy Yard.	2.5 miles (4.0 km)
New Mexico Avenue	NW	Street in Wesley Heights. Runs from 42nd Street and Tunlaw Road to Nebraska Avenue. Named Tunlaw Street until 1906.	0.8 miles (1.3 km)
New York Avenue	NW, NE	Major avenue whose main section runs from 15th Street near the White House into Maryland, where it becomes the John Hanson Highway. From 6th Street to Maryland, it carries U.S. Route 50. A smaller one-block section exists on the west side of the White House in Foggy Bottom.	5.3 miles (8.5 km)
North Carolina Avenue	SE, NE	Street that runs from E Street and New Jersey Avenue in Capitol Hill to 16th and C Streets in Kingman Park.	1.6 miles (2.6 km)
North Dakota Avenue	NW	A residential road in Manor Park that is not as long or as heavily used as South Dakota Avenue. Runs from an intersection with Kansas Avenue and Blair Road to an intersection with Sheridan and 3rd Streets. Originally continued northwest to Georgia Avenue, but a Senate bill eliminated that portion in 1912.	0.4 miles (0.64 km)
Ohio Drive	SW	A road that loops around West Potomac and East Potomac Parks between the Lincoln, Jefferson and FDR memorials. In the 19th century, Ohio Avenue was a street in the Federal Triangle area. Formerly Riverside Drive, the road was renamed Ohio Drive in 1950.	5.1 miles (8.2 km)
Oklahoma Avenue	NE	Street in Kingman Park that runs from 21st Street to Benning Road. One of four state-named roadways that does not connect to another state-named roadway.	0.4 miles (0.64 km)
Oregon Avenue	NW	Street in North Chevy Chase that runs from Military Road, along the west side of Rock Creek Park to Western Avenue. Until 1938, it was named Daniel Road. The original Oregon Avenue was in Shaw and was renamed Swann Street NW in 1938.	1.7 miles (2.7 km)
Pennsylvania Avenue	NW, SE	Along with Delaware, Maryland, and New Jersey, one of four avenues that radiates from the U.S. Capitol. Forms the Federal Triangle and connects the Capitol with the White House, which is located at 1600 Pennsylvania Avenue NW. The western segment begins at M Street in Georgetown, runs in front of the White House, jogs at 15th Street, is interrupted by the U.S. Capitol, but continues into Southeast, crossing the Anacostia River over the John Philip Sousa Bridge into the Fairlawn neighborhood. Pennsylvania Avenue continues about 2 miles to Southern Avenue where it crosses into Prince George's County, Maryland and continues as Maryland Route 4.	6.1 miles (9.8 km)
Puerto Rico Avenue	NE	A short road along the Metro tracks which stretches for about five blocks from Taylor Street to the intersection of 6th and Buchanan Streets. At one time street signs named the street ""Porto Rico Avenue"".	0.4 miles (0.64 km)
Rhode Island Avenue	NW, NE	A major artery that begins at M Street and Connecticut Avenue in Downtown, goes through Logan Circle, exits the District in Woodridge, and continues for a couple miles in Maryland. For much of its length, it carries U.S. 1.	4.7 miles (7.6 km)
South Carolina Avenue	SE	Street that runs from 2nd and F Streets into Independence Avenue,15th Street, and Massachusetts Avenue.	1.2 miles (1.9 km)
South Dakota Avenue	NE	A thoroughfare in that runs from Riggs Road in Lamond Riggs to at New York Avenue in Fort Lincoln. A short non-contiguous section, which lies northwest of the main route of South Dakota Avenue extends off New Hampshire Avenue and terminates at a cul-de-sac.	3.6 miles (5.8 km)
Tennessee Avenue	NE	The counterpart to Kentucky Avenue. The road begins at Lincoln Park and ends at 15th Street.	0.6 miles (0.97 km)
Texas Avenue	SE	Street in Benning Ridge that is segmented into three sections: from Ridge Road to East Capitol Street, from Nash Street to Pennsylvania Avenue, and from 29th to 27th Streets.	1.4 miles (2.3 km)
Utah Avenue	NW	Street in Upper Chevy Chase that runs from 27th Street to Western Avenue.	1 mile (1.6 km)
Vermont Avenue	NW	The counterpart to Connecticut Avenue. The road begins at Lafayette Square, passes through McPherson Square in addition to Thomas and Logan Circles, and ends at Florida Avenue near Howard University.	1.5 miles (2.4 km)
Virginia Avenue	NW, SW, SE	One of only two avenues to go through three of the four quadrants, which exists in several intermittent segments. One runs in Foggy Bottom from the Rock Creek and Potomac Parkway to Constitution Avenue. Another section runs from 7th Street to 2nd Street, and one final section from South Capitol Street to 9th Street, alongside the Southeast Freeway and the CSX tracks.	2.5 miles (4.0 km)
Washington Avenue	SW	Street which like its counterpart, Louisiana Avenue, is near the Capitol but not in L’Enfant's parade. The avenue was originally occupied by a canal, but now runs from Independence Avenue and E Street, and serves as a connection between Capitol Hill and Interstate 395. At one time, it was called Canal Street, while a street named Washington Drive existed along a part of the National Mall. Along with Adams Drive, it was converted to a dirt path from the Capitol to the Washington Monument.	0.4 miles (0.64 km)
West Virginia Avenue	NE	Street running from K Street NE to New York Avenue NE. It runs through the Near Northeast Trinidad and Ivy City neighbourhoods. It forms the eastern boundary for Gallaudet University and the western boundary for Mount Olivet Cemetery.	1.3 miles (2.1 km)
Wisconsin Avenue	NW	Major artery in that begins at Georgetown Waterfront Park on the bank of the Potomac River then continues northward into Friendship Heights, crossing into Maryland as Maryland State Route 355 (where it eventually changes names to Rockville Pike). Prior to 1906, Wisconsin Avenue was current-day 37th Street in Burleith. In 1906, Tenley Road was renamed Wisconsin Avenue.	4.3 miles (6.9 km)
Wyoming Avenue	NW	Residential street in Kalorama that runs from Kalorama Road to 18th Street.	0.8 miles (1.3 km)
