= Virginia Avenue (disambiguation) =

Virginia Avenue may refer to:

- Virginia Avenue, Washington, District of Columbia, USA
  - Virginia Avenue Tunnel, rail tunnel in Washington, DC, USA
- Virginia Avenue District, on Virginia Avenue, Indianapolis, Indiana, USA;
- Virginia Avenue Colored School, Louisville, Kentucky, USA
- Virginia Avenue (1973 song) by Tom Waits off the album Closing Time (album)

== See also ==
- Virginia Street, Reno, Nevada, USA
  - Virginia Street Bridge
- West Virginia Avenue, Washington, DC, USA
- Virginia (disambiguation)
