= Industrial Freeway =

The following roads have been called the Industrial Freeway:

- Industrial Freeway, unconstructed portion of, as well as an older name for, California State Route 47
- Detroit Industrial Freeway, part of Interstate 94 in Michigan
- New York Avenue Industrial Freeway, proposed replacement for U.S. Route 50 in the District of Columbia
- The unconstructed Interstate 505 in Portland, Oregon
