= Arizona Avenue =

Arizona Avenue could refer to:

- Arizona Avenue (Chandler, Arizona)
- Arizona Avenue (Washington, D.C.)
- Arizona Avenue in Baltimore, Maryland
