= Washington Brick Company =

Coordinates: 38.9037°N 76.9840°W

- Formerly: Washington Brick Machine Company
- Type: Public
- Industry: brick manufacturing
- Founded: 1874 in Washington, D.C.
- Headquarters: Washington, D.C., United States
- Area served: Washington, D.C.
- Products: red clay bricks
- Number of employees: 23 factory employees (1874)

The Washington Brick Machine Company was a brick manufacturing company which operated in Washington, D.C. starting in 1874. Its bricks were machine made and were used extensively across the city in major buildings still standing including the Eisenhower Executive Office Building, Arts and Industries Building and National Building Museum. In 1894, the company becomes the Washington Brick Company.

== History ==
=== The Beginning ===
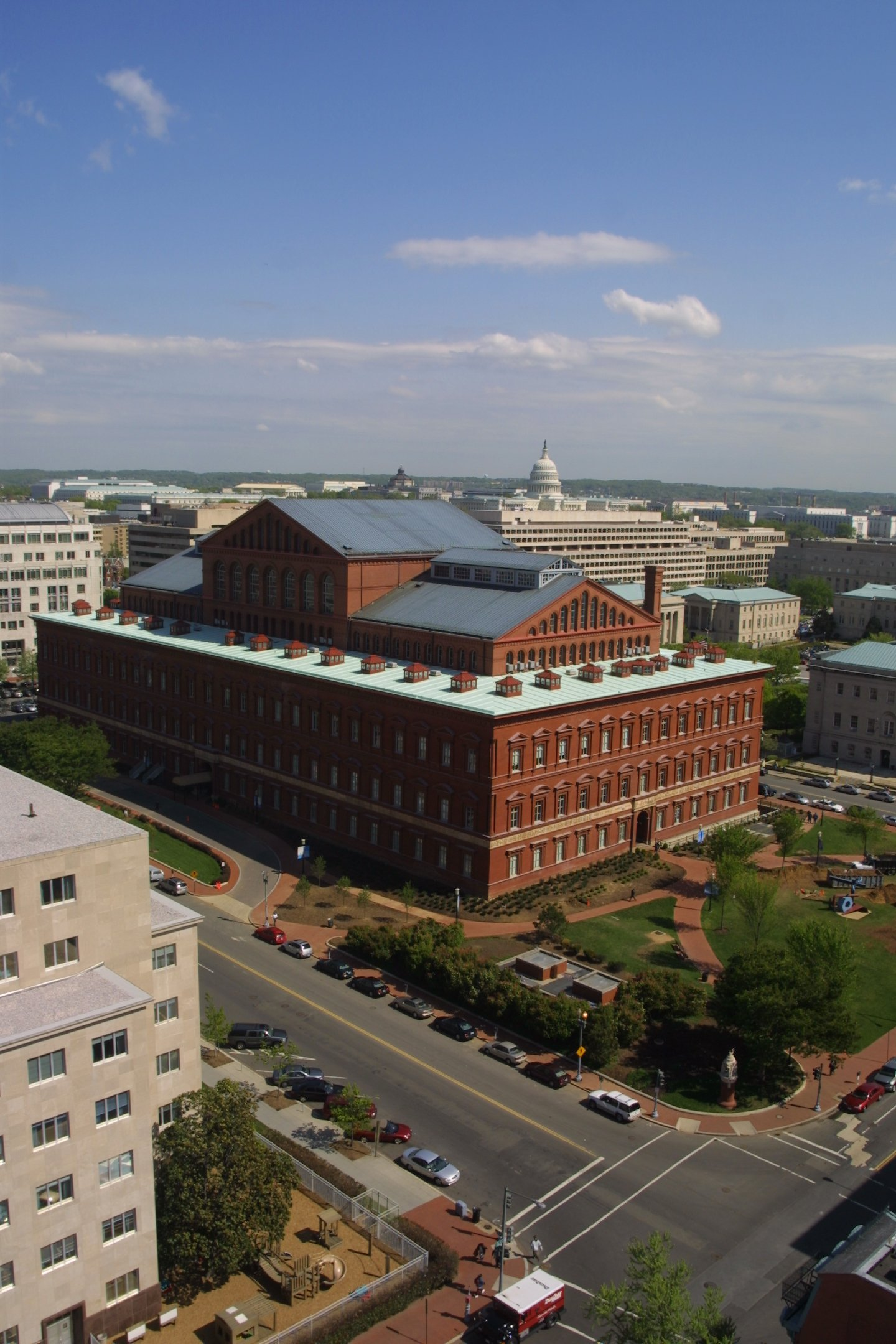
The Pension Office Building built in 1883 (now the National Building Museum), featuring Washington Brick Machine Company bricks.

The company was incorporated in 1874 and was originally named the Washington Brick Machine Company. Operating in the northeastern quadrant of the city, it made bricks using a machine as opposed to the more traditional way of molded by hand. This brought prices down in the period following the Civil War when Washington, DC was growing and modernizing under the leadership of Alexander "Boss" Shepherd and his successor, William Dennison Jr.

For the first decade of its life the company won several big bids with the Federal Government to provide bricks. On September 14, 1876, following a request for bid from the office of General Orville E. Babcock, the company was awarded the contract for 1.5 million burned red bricks to be used for the construction of the east side of State, War and Navy Building. On August 30, 1879, the company is awarded the contract to furnish the bricks for the National Museum designed by Adolf Cluss. On July 6, 1880, the company is awarded the contract for the North Wing of the State, War and Navy Building, having the lowest bid price. On July 4, 1881, Edward Clark, Architect of the Capitol awards the company the extension of the Government Printing Office. The price was $6.93 per thousand. On January 2, 1883, General Montgomery C. Meigs informs the Secretary of the Interior Henry M. Teller that the Washington Brick Machine Company has signed a contract to provide 600,000 pressed bricks at $10.93 per thousand and 9 million common bricks at $7.93 per thousand for the new Pension Office Building (now the National Building Museum) on Judiciary Square.

=== Brick Size Controversy ===
The Washington Brick Machine Company was at the center of a controversy in the early part of 1884 being a major producer of bricks with 80,000 bricks being made each day. The Sealer of the Weights and Measures, Mr. Small started criticizing the manufacturers for their inconsistency in size and weight of bricks. The attacks were targeted primarily at machine-made bricks as he affirmed that they were smaller and weighed more than the traditional hand-made bricks due to a higher density. These bricks, therefore were not in compliance with the law at the time. By then three quarters of the bricks being made in the city were machine-made. The attacks were a reaction to the threat to the artisans' way of life by mechanization.

An October 30, 1820 ordinance setting the size of bricks to 9 1/4 x 4 5/8 and 2 1/4 in clear was not being enforced. The molds were also required to be marked "stamped as correct by the sealer of weight and measures". It appears that this had not been enforced for some time. A committee representing the Federation of Labor joined the debates with the District Commissioners in the interest of the traditional hand-made manufacturers which they represented. They argued that making the smaller bricks affected the workman's wages as well as raised price of bricks for builders. They promised to provide samples to prove their case.

The Washington Brick Machine Company and other brick manufactures brought samples to the Inspector of Buildings Entwisle to have them measures. They were said to come from the standard molds. While they were brought to the wrong office he gave his opinion on the matter stating that the difference in size was due to the nature of the clay. While the machine molds were smaller, they were packed more compactly then the hand made ones leading to a larger brick once fired. On March 12, 1884, the Federation of Labor was told of the possibility of an amendment to the law was being discussed but that it was being reviewed by the Engineer Commissioner Lydecker.

It appears that the underlying reason for this controversy had to do with the unfair competition experienced by the traditional manufacturers. The Washington Brick Machine Company along with A. Richards & Son, William H. West & Brothers, W.T. Walker, Ino P. Appleman and I.P. childs & Son manufactured three quarters of the bricks used in the city. This represented 50 million bricks at the time. The hand-made bricks represented a fraction of sales and the wages were falling as they were not competitive with the machines.

On May 26, 1884, the Committee on Bricks of the Federation of Labor submitted an amendment to the law to Major Lydecker: All bricks sold or offered for sale in the District of Columbia, except cornice or fancy bricks, shall measure not less than 9 inches in length, 4 1/2 inches in width and 2 1/4 inches in thickness. Any bricks sold or offered for sale in the said District under the said size by any brick merchant will subject the said merchant to a penalty of $50 fine or 60 days in jail for the first offense, or both, and $500 fine or one year in Jail, or both, for the second offense; the said fines to be collected the same as other District fines."

=== Wagon Crashes ===
On May 15, 1884, two accidents involving wagons owned by the Washington Brick Machine Company were involved in crashes with children. The first one occurred in an alley between 9th Street NW and 19th Street NW. The driver was named Alfred Robinson and the victim was a 14-year-old boy named Henry York. The wagon was stalled and when the team started, the swingtree knocked the boy down and a wheel rolled over his legs. He survived.

The second one involved brick wagon # 17 driven by Robert Duvall who ran over Charles Hassler, an eight-year-old boy. The crash occurred at the corner of 1st St NE and H Street NE in the heart of Swampoodle. He was taken to his house and died ten minutes later. The driver was arrested by the police. On May 17, Robert Duvall was first charged with reckless driving before was charged with manslaughter and sent to a grand jury. The charge was ignored on June 10, 1884

=== Real Estate Investments ===
Starting in 1884, the company also started diversifying its business. While it was still making bricks, it was also buying land for real estate development. It purchased the tract of land known as Trinidad from Columbian University (now George Washington University) on October 17, 1884. This piece of land represented 150 acres located north of Boundary Street (now Florida Avenue NE) between Kendall Green (now Gallaudet University) and Bladensburg Pike (now Bladensburg Road NE). It had been donated to the university several years before by William W. Corcoran. The university sold it for $100,000. In December of the same year, the university files an injunction against the company accusing them of removing top soil and clay from the lot adjacent to the factory to manufacture bricks a few weeks before. A restraining order was issued by the court. However, on April 1, 1885, it is announced that the company purchased 152 acres (62 ha) east of the Deaf and Dumb Asylum (Gallaudet University) from Columbian University ($85,000) and the children of Mr. Oyster ($20,000).

Later that year on June 10, 1885, it was announced that the company was going to develop a new residential complex on square 1003 between 12th and 13th Street NE and H Street NE and I Street NE. A new 44 feet (13 m) wide street would be laid in the middle of the square and be called Wylie Street with two alleys running on the back parallel to it. It was estimated that the cost to build the street would range from $30,000 to $40,000. 105 lots would be available on the square ranging from 20 to 30 feet (6.1 to 9.1 m) on the front. Houses would be built by the company with between 7 and 10 rooms. However, most of the houses built were not this big.

On September 15, 1894, the company field a deed to transfer all assets from the old company to the Washington Brick Company. This allowed the company to legally change its name by removing the word machine.

== Operations ==
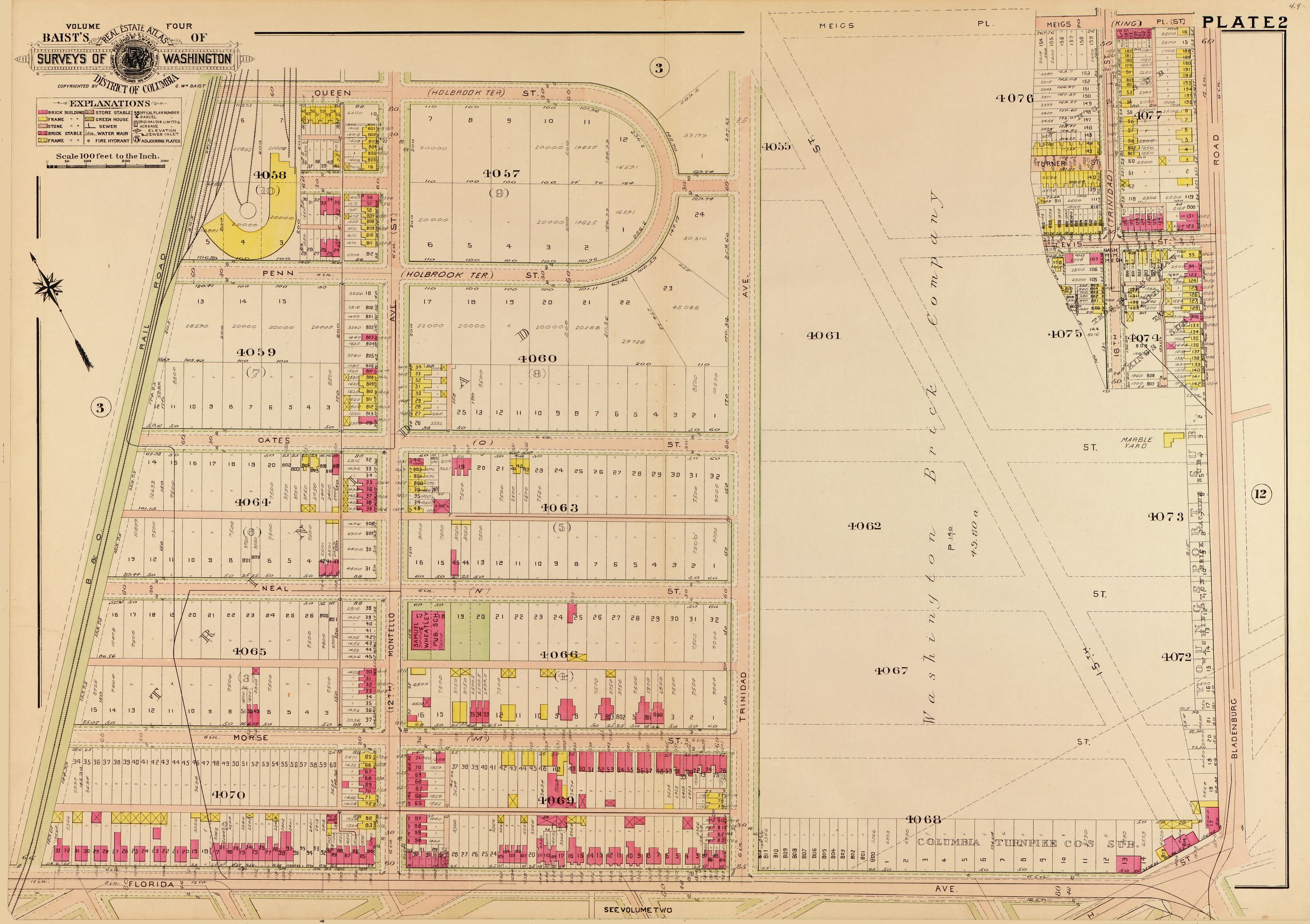
Map showing the Washington Brick Company lot in 1907 in Trinidad

The offices of the company were located at 1420 New York Avenue NW.

The Washington Brick Company operated from the northeast quadrant of the city. Its manufacturing plant was located off of Boundary Street (now Florida Avenue) where it intersects with H Street NE in what is now the Trinidad neighborhood. The plant covered 10 acres of land in what was at the time rural land. Part of the property was used to mine the fine clay used to make the bricks on site. According to the promoters, it could be mined to a depth of 40 feet. On site, visitors could see several low sheds probably used to dry the bricks, a large building containing an engine and the machine room. The kilns used to fire the bricks were also on-site and the company was building ovens to dry the bricks and no longer rely on sunny days to dry the bricks.

It employed 23 men working in various roles focused around a new machine in 1874 which allowed for the manufacturing of bricks to be industrialized. The machine was Graham's patent and introduced to Washington, DC by S. E. Henkins representing the National Brick Machine Company based in New Jersey allowing for the manufacturing of between 40,000 and 60,000 bricks a day. This machine was powered by a forty-horsepower engine (housed in the main building). Barrows of loose clay and stones were thrown in a hopper where they would be crushed by four two feet in diameter rollers. The pulverized clay powder would then drop in a mixing cylinder where it would we steamed. It would then make its way into a vat. A conveyor belt of buckets would collect just enough to form a brick. The wet clay would then fall into a mold before dropping on a conveyor belt. From there they were taken off by men and transported on barrows to a drying room prior to being fired up in the kiln.

== Major Projects ==
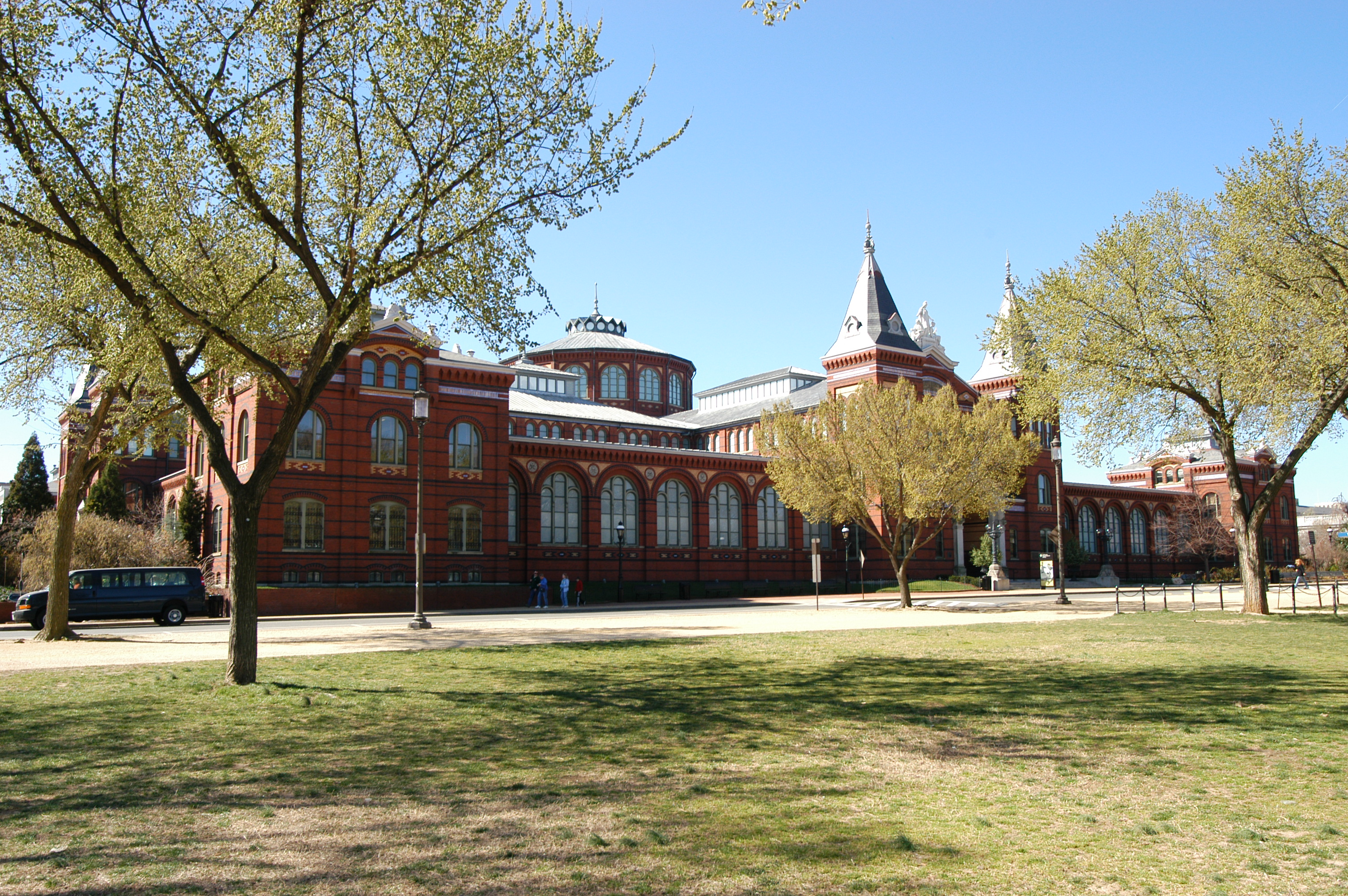
National Museum (now Arts and Industries Building) featuring bricks made by the company

- 1876: State, War and Navy Building (East Side) (now the Eisenhower Executive Office Building)
- 1879: National Museum (now the Arts and Industries Building) designed by Adolf Cluss.
- 1880: State, War and Navy Building (North Wing)
- 1881: Extension of the Government Printing Office Building
- 1883: Pension Office Building (now the National Building Museum).
