= Truck House No. 13 (Washington, D.C.) =

- U.S. National Register of Historic Places
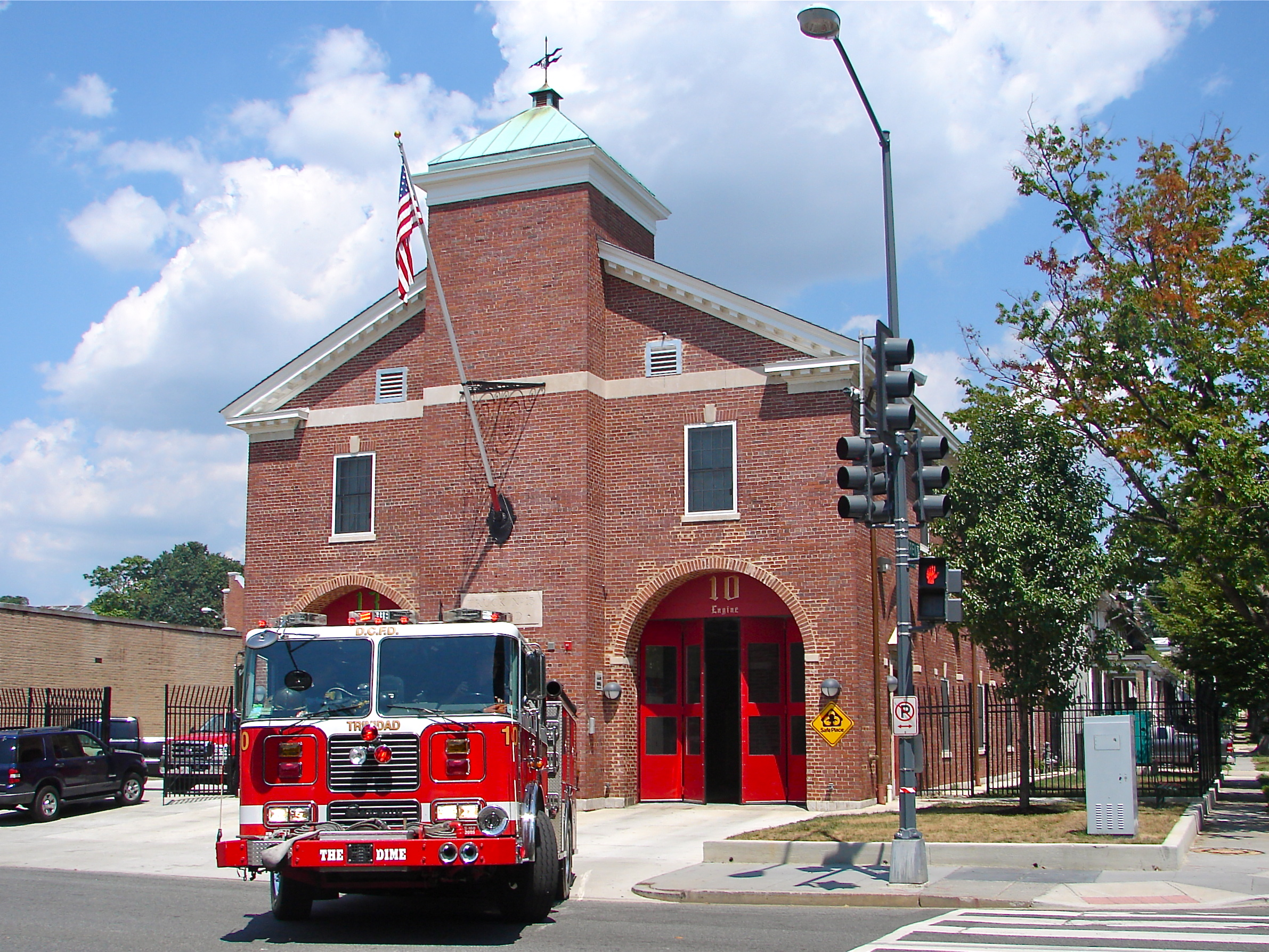
- "The Dime" answering an alarm (2011)

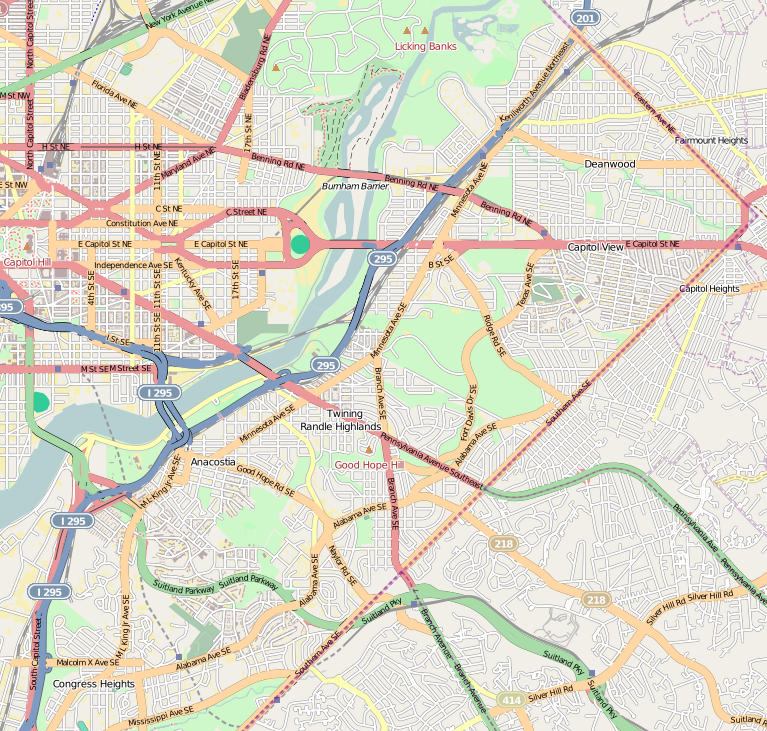
- Location within Washington, D.C. Location within the District of Columbia Location within the United States
- Location: 1342 Florida Ave. NE, Washington, District of Columbia
- Coordinates: 38°54′5″N 76°59′13″W
- Area: less than one acre
- Built: 1925
- Architect: Parks & Baxter
- Architectural style: Colonial Revival
- MPS: Firehouses in Washington DC MPS
- NRHP reference No.: 07000535
- Added to NRHP: June 6, 2007

Truck House No. 13, also known as the Trinidad Firehouse is a historic firehouse located at 1342 Florida Ave. NE, Washington, D.C. It was built in 1925 and added to the United States National Register of Historic Places in 2007.

== History ==
It was built in the Colonial Revival style as a prototype new firehouses in the District of Columbia, though the plan was not repeated. Architect Albert Harris supervised the design, but local architects Parks and Baxter are also often attributed.

Truck Company 13 was organized on December 9, 1925, and has served ever since at this location. Its original equipment was a 1925 Seagrave 75' aerial ladder truck. In 1940 Engine Company No. 10 moved from its old firehouse on Maryland Avenue to this location. Engine 10, known as "the Dime," was the busiest engine company in the nation from 1991 to 2003.
