= League Park (disambiguation) =

League Park, and variations on that name, used as the name of a Major League Baseball park, was a designation frequently applied in the late 19th century to early 20th century to distinguish a professional team's stadium from a public park or other recreational venue. As such, the term may refer to any one of these former baseball parks:

- League Park (Akron) in Akron, Ohio
- League Park in Cleveland, Ohio; the most enduring of the various "League Parks"
- League Park (Cincinnati) in Ohio
- League Park (Houston) in Texas
- League Park (Toledo) in Ohio
- League Park (San Antonio) in Texas
- League Park in St. Louis, Missouri, better known as Robison Field
- American League Park, better known as Hilltop Park, in New York City
- American League Park in Washington, D.C.
- National League Park in Cleveland, Ohio
- National League Park in Philadelphia, Pennsylvania, better known as Baker Bowl
- League Park, in Springfield, Massachusetts, also known as Pynchon Park
- Bain Field, Norfolk, Virginia; formerly League Park (1917–1930)
- League Park in Fort Wayne, Indiana
