= New York Avenue Bridge (Anacostia River) =

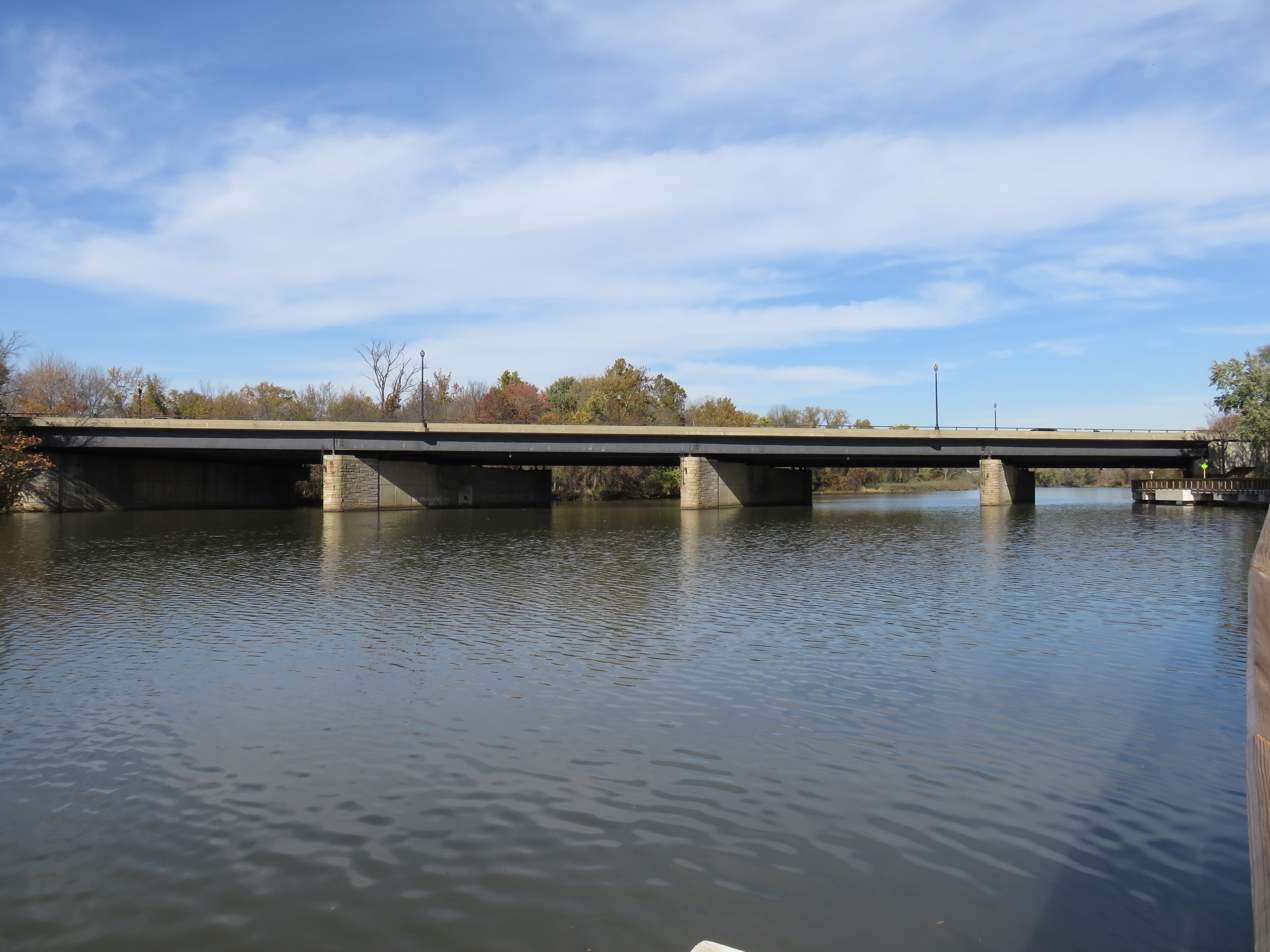
- The New York Avenue Bridge in 2016
- Coordinates: 38.918067°N 76.942534°W
- Carries: US 50 (New York Avenue NE)
- Crosses: Anacostia River
- Locale: Washington, D.C., U.S.
- Maintained by: United States Department of Transportation

Characteristics
- Total length: 450 feet (140 m)

History
- Opened: October 22, 1954

Statistics
- Toll: Free both ways

Location
- Interactive map of New York Avenue Bridge

The New York Avenue Bridge is a bridge carrying U.S. Route 50 and New York Avenue NE over the Anacostia River in Washington, D.C., in the United States. It was completed in 1954 as part of the Baltimore–Washington Parkway project.

== About the bridge ==
=== Early efforts to build the Baltimore-Washington Parkway ===
U.S. Route 1 in the District of Columbia led to U.S. Route 1 in Maryland, and from about 1911 to 1954 was the only major highway from the District of Columbia to Baltimore, Maryland, and Annapolis, Maryland. In the District of Columbia, Route 1 followed Maryland Avenue SW and NE to the intersection with Bladensburg Road and then followed Bladensburg Road to the District boundary with Maryland. In Maryland, U.S. Route 1 was a two-lane, shoulder-less highway that rapidly became clogged with traffic in the 1930s. It was so hazardous, having been constructed at a time when automobiles traveled at much slower speeds, that it earned the sobriquets "Suicide Lane," "Bloody Mary", and "Old Bloody." As early as 1910, however, the Maryland State Roads Commission began planning for a wide, concrete highway to replace Route 1.

Planning for the new road continued through the 1920s but gained momentum when Frederic Adrian Delano, chairman of the National Capital Parks and Planning Commission (NCPPC), took an interest in the route in the late 1920s. But significant opposition to the new highway came from the government of the District of Columbia, which foresaw multimillion-dollar expenditures from being forced to extend New York Avenue, build new bridges, and build an interchange with the parkway.

A bridge carrying New York Avenue over the Anacostia River was first proposed by the District of Columbia Highway Department in 1941. The bridge would also create a grade separation between South Dakota Avenue NE and New York Avenue NE, allowing South Dakota Avenue traffic to pass under New York Avenue and separate the two heavy streams of traffic.

In 1942, President Franklin D. Roosevelt directed that $2 million of National Industrial Recovery Act public works funding be used to obtain a wider right of way along Route 1 from the District line to Fort Meade, Maryland. That highway should enter the District of Columbia and connect with New York Avenue NE appears to have been a noncontroversial and almost unanimously accepted design element. At that time, New York Avenue NE did not extend past Bladensburg Road NE. With the bridge recommendation not finding legislative favor, the Commissioners of the District of Columbia agreed in May 1942 to extend New York Avenue to the District line. But resource demands caused by World War II postponed work on the extension, and by 1946 the city had still not extended New York Avenue past Bladensburg Road.

=== Bridge construction ===
In 1949, a bill was introduced in Congress to complete the Baltimore-Washington Parkway. Hearings on the bill were held in 1950. Gordon R. Young, engineer with the D.C. Highways Department argued for federal funding of the D.C. portion of the project. The cost of connecting the parkway to city streets would be $2.25 million, he said. Constructing an interchange, bridge, and other aspects of the parkway would overwhelm the city's small roads and bridges budget. Young also argued for extension of the parkway south along the eastern banks of the Anacostia River. The parkway would be of little value, he concluded, to intra-District travel, but could serve as a bypass for heavy trucks traveling south. The House Committee on Public Works agreed, and added 0.5 miles (0.80 km) of parkway inside the District of Columbia (between the District line and South Dakota Avenue NE) to federalize the bridge and interchange as Young had requested. President Harry S. Truman signed the bill into law on August 3, 1950.

The New York Avenue Bridge was part of a larger project which included an overpass over the tracks of the Pennsylvania Railroad, an overpass over South Dakota Avenue NE, and extensions of both New York Avenue and South Dakota Avenue. The cost of the railroad overpass was estimated at $200,000, and the South Dakota Avenue overpass at about $300,000. New York Avenue NE ended at an intersection with Bladensburg Road, and no grading or road existed beyond that point. South Dakota Avenue NE extended from Bladensburg Road NE to about 33rd Place NE, but this four block stretch was merely a graded dirt road. The design of the Baltimore-Washington Parkway required New York Avenue NE to have six lanes from the Kenilworth Interchange to South Dakota Avenue NE, and then shift to four lanes between South Dakota Avenue NE and Bladensburg Road NE. South Dakota Avenue NE would have four lanes between New York Avenue NE and Bladensburg Road NE, then drop to the street's existing two lanes beyond that. Grading and paving of New York Avenue NE from Bladensburg Road to the Pennsylvania Railroad tracks was anticipated to cost $150,000, while grading and building New York Avenue from South Dakota Avenue NE to the border of Anacostia Park was estimated at $70,500. (Anacostia Park was federal land, therefore any bridge or roadway through or over the park was a federal responsibility.) The city estimated it would take $160,000 to pave South Dakota Avenue NE from Bladensburg Road to New York Avenue NE. The total cost of the entire project was estimated in November 1950 at $2.38 million.

The architectural firm of Mills & Petticord designed the bridge and overpasses, and the NCPPC approved the New York Avenue Bridge's design in May 1951. The design for the Kenilworth Interchange was approved by the federal government in late March 1951. The interchange was designed to handle 32,000 automobiles per day, with nearly 11,000 of these using the off-ramps to reach New York Avenue.

Excavation work on the two overpasses began about July 1, 1951. By this time, the cost of railroad overpass had risen to $300,000, while the cost of the South Dakota Avenue overpass had fallen to $250,000. By February 1952, delays had caused estimated costs to rise to $2.51 million for the entire project, with work now expected to begin on the overpasses in the summer 1952. They were to be finished in summer 1953.

The New York Avenue Bridge itself did not win design approval until August 1952, when the United States Army Corps of Engineers gave its consent. Construction of the bridge would be handled by the Bureau of Public Roads (BPR). The 450-foot (140 m) long steel bridge was expected to cost $1 million to $1.5 million. The BPR said at that time that contracts would be awarded in October 1952, and work on the bridge was expected to begin in November and last 18 months.

To accommodate construction of the bridge, the United States Department of Justice gave a 10-acre (40,000 m^{2}) strip of land belonging to the National Training School for Boys to the District of Columbia in December 1952. The western approaches and abutments of the New York Avenue Bridge were built on this land. To further aid in construction, a temporary bridge was built over the Anacostia River and used by construction crews in building the new permanent span.

In February 1954, construction on the bridge had advanced to the point where officials believed it would open on time in the fall of 1954. In May 1954, BPR advertised for bids to build the eastern and western approaches to the bridge.

=== Dedication ===
The final cost of the entire road extension, overpass, and New York Avenue Bridge was $2 million to $2.1 million. The cost of the New York Avenue Bridge was reported to be either $1.2 million or $1.4 million.

The New York Avenue Bridge was dedicated and opened along with the rest of the federally-built portion of the Baltimore-Washington Parkway on October 22, 1954.

The New York Avenue Bridge was expected to carry just 11,000 automobiles a day when it opened, but within a week of its dedication it was carrying more than 21,000 automobiles a day. Roughly 18,000 of these vehicles used New York Avenue NE, while about 3,000 used South Dakota Avenue NE.

== See also ==
- New York Avenue Bridge

== Bibliography ==
- Committee on Appropriations (1954). Civil Functions, Department of the Army. Appropriations for 1955. U.S. House of Representatives. 83d Cong., 2d sess. Washington, D.C.: U.S. Government Printing Office. hdl:2027/uc1.b3637291.
- Krakow, Jere L. (1990). Rock Creek and Potomac Parkway, George Washington Memorial Parkway, Suitland Parkway, Baltimore-Washington Parkway. Washington, D.C.: U.S. Department of the Interior, National Park Service. hdl:2027/mdp.39015017705594.
