= New York Avenue Bridge =

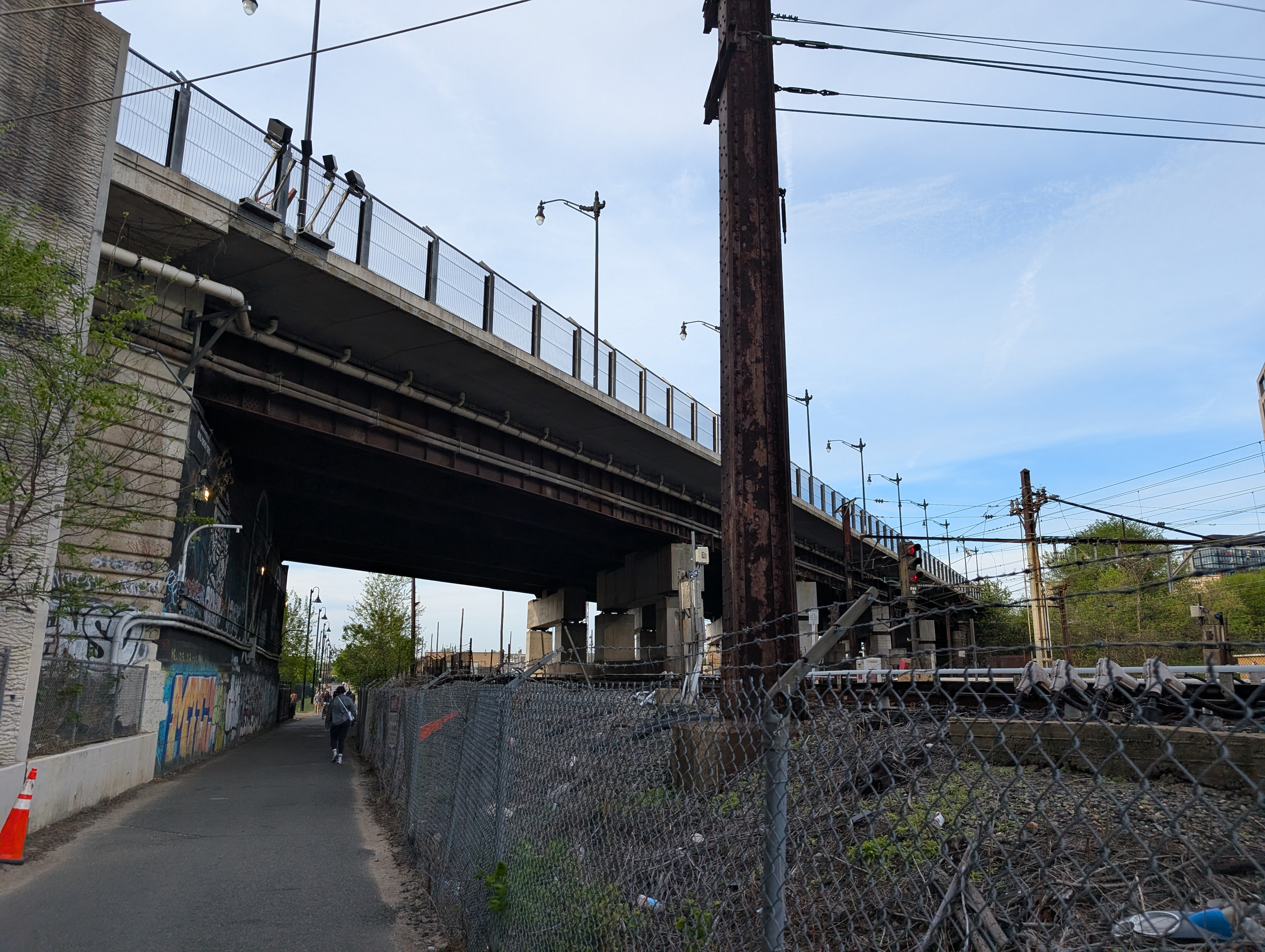
- Coordinates: 38.91°N 77.0015°W
- Carries: US 50 (New York Avenue)
- Crosses: Amtrak, CSX, and WMATA rails
- Locale: Washington, D.C.

Location
- Interactive map of New York Avenue Bridge

The New York Avenue Bridge is a bridge carrying U.S. Route 50 and New York Avenue, NE over the Amtrak, CSX and WMATA rails in Washington, D.C.

In November 2009, the District of Columbia Department of Transportation began a two-year $36.5 million project to repair the underside, deck and roadway of the bridge. Funds for the project were provided through the American Recovery and Reinvestment Act of 2009 (ARRA), and the project was the largest ARRA effort in the District of Columbia.

== See also ==
- New York Avenue Bridge (Anacostia River)
