= American League Park =

Defunct baseball stadium in Washington, D.C.

- American League Park I
- Interactive map of American League Park
- Location: Corner of Florida Avenue NE and Trinidad Avenue NE, Washington D.C.
- Coordinates: 38°54′6″N 76°59′12″W
- Type: Baseball Field
- Surface: Grass

Construction
- Opened: 1901
- Closed: 1903

Tenants
- Washington Senators (AL) (1901–1903); Washington Potomacs (ECL) (1923-1924)

American League Park, known by historians as American League Park I, was a baseball park that formerly stood in the Trinidad neighborhood of Washington, D.C., at the corner of Florida Avenue and Trinidad Avenue NE on land previously belonging to the Washington Brick Company. It hosted the Washington Senators from the 1901 season through the 1903 season.

The ballpark's left-field fence would become Neal Street NE; its third-base line ran along Trinidad Avenue; its first-base line ran along Florida Avenue NE; and its right-field fence ran along present-day Bladensburg Road.

On March 20, 1901, the district commissioners granted permission to the American League to establish a baseball park at the location following an application including plans and specifications for the grand stand and the other supporting structures. Snowden Ashford was the building inspector who handled the case. The land had been previously occupied by the Washington Brick Company in an area sparsely built at the time; the closest buildings were located more than 50 feet (15 m) from the outlines of the grounds. Therefore, it was considered that it would not cause more menace to the area then if a lumber yard was established there. No specific regulations for the establishment of baseball grounds were in place in the District of Columbia at the time. No opposition from nearby landowners was received, therefore permission was granted.

The grandstands were made out of wood as most ballparks of the time. The left-field line ran roughly north–south, with the left field measuring 290 feet (88 m).

1903 Sanborn map showing a portion of the ballpark

Boundary Field, in Northwest DC, had been the preferred site for the American League Senators, but its usage had been blocked by the National League, which still had rights to the site despite no longer having a franchise in Washington. Once peace was reached between the leagues, the Senators moved to that site for the 1904 season, which became known as American League Park II or National Park. The stands from American League Park I were transported to the new location along with the team. By 1907, there was no longer a baseball field on the site.

Preceded by First park	Home of the American League; Washington Senators; 1901 – 1903	Succeeded by Boundary Field
