= Boundary Field =

Baseball park in Washington, D.C., U.S.

- American League Park II; National Park
- Interactive map of Boundary Field
- Location: Georgia Avenue, 5th Street NW, W Street NW and Florida Avenue NW, Washington D.C., U.S.
- Coordinates: 38°55′3″N 77°1′13″W
- Operator: National League
- Type: Baseball field
- Surface: Grass

Construction
- Demolished: March 17, 1911

Tenants
- Georgetown Hoyas football (independent) (1891–1893); Washington Senators (AA/NL) (1891–1899); Washington Senators (I) (AL) (1904–1910)

Boundary Field, also known as American League Park II and National Park, was a baseball ground in Washington, D.C., United States. located on the site currently occupied by Howard University Hospital; bounded approximately by Georgia Avenue, 5th Street, W Street and Florida Avenue, NW. It was just outside what was then the city limit of Washington, whose northern boundary was Boundary Street which was renamed Florida Avenue in 1890.

== History ==
=== The First Team ===
The ground was home to the Washington Senators of the American Association in 1891 and then of the National League from 1892 to 1899 after the League absorbed the Association. The National League contracted after the 1899 season and the Senators folded. From 1891 to 1893, the field was also the venue for home games of the Georgetown football program.

=== The Second Team ===
The field was also the home of the American League's Washington Senators (also known as the Nationals) from 1904 through 1910. When the American League declared itself a major league in 1901 and began raiding National League rosters for talent, the NL decided to retain its lease on the Boundary Field property. This forced the American League's new reincarnation of the Senators to find an alternative home field, and they settled upon a field in Northeast DC with the prosaic name American League Park.

After peace was made between the two leagues in 1903, the Senators moved to the old Boundary Field location, which was subsequently also referred to as American League Park. (Historians use the terms "American League Park I" and "American League Park II" to make the distinction). The club disassembled the wooden grandstand at the first American League Park and moved the lumber a couple of miles northwest on Florida Avenue, to install it as the grandstand at the new park. Initially the diamond was aligned such that home plate through second base pointed eastward, similarly to the previous ballpark.

When the Senators were rebranded as the Nationals, the park was also referred to as National Park or sometimes Nationals' Park. The Senators/Nationals played there through the 1910 season. In 1909, the annual Congressional Baseball Game was begun, and was held at this venue and its successor for the next several decades.

On April 14, 1910, one of baseball's great traditions was born at National Park when President William Howard Taft threw out the ceremonial first pitch. The game involved the Washington Senators against the Philadelphia Athletics which the Senators won 3–0. The Senators' Manager, Jimmy McAleer came up with the idea and catcher Gabby Street was selected to catch the ball instead of star pitcher Walter Johnson after he declined the offer. however, at the last minute, President Taft threw it to Walter Johnson.

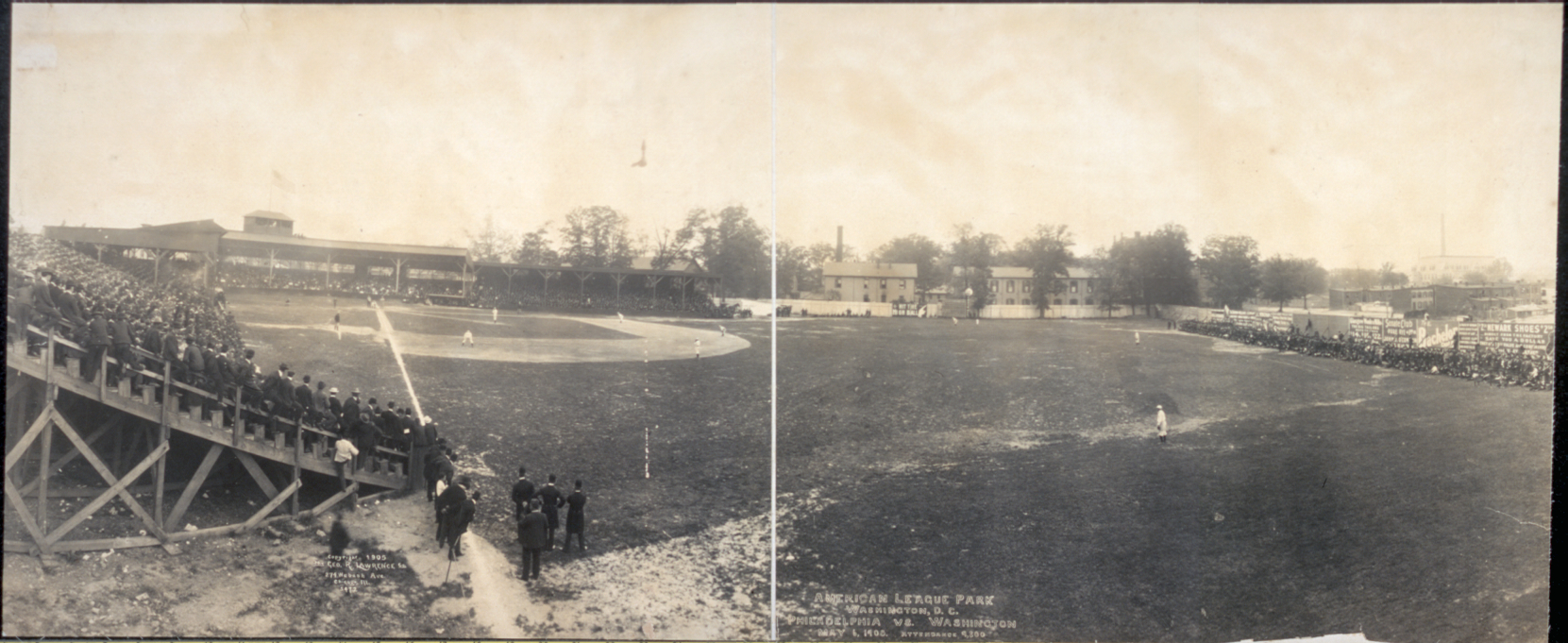
An American League baseball game between the Washington Nationals and the Philadelphia Athletics at Boundary Field in May 1905.

=== The Fire ===
The wooden stands were destroyed by fire on March 17, 1911. Around 11:30 in the morning, the fire started and spread rapidly due to a southwestern wind, threatening to destroy the nearby lumber yard owned by the Eisinger Brothers on 7th and W Street NW. It was detected when a bicycle police officer, T. F. Sweeney of the 8th precinct, James P. O'Dea, superintendent of the park and another man noticed a small curl of smoke coming from under the bleachers as they were standing at the main entrance. The police officer ran to the police telephone box located at 7th Street and Florida Ave NW. No. 7 Engine Company responded to the call while the superintendent attempted to put out the fire by hand, burning himself to the wrist. Upon arrival, it was determined that the fire was beyond the control of a single engine and reinforcement was called from another local police box.

The Fire Deputy Chief, G. J. Sullivan arrived at the scene in the chief's automobile. The nearby lumber yard had suffered significant damage in two previous fires, with the latest only four years prior and damaging the clubhouse and grandstand. Based on those facts and the height of the flames in the air, a general alarm was called. Two lines of hoses were laid through the main entrance but the fire spread in the opposite direction, sweeping around the north side of the grandstand. It reached the outfield bleachers and soon after, the old storehouses in the Freedman's Hospital and used by the lumber yard, causing $25,000 worth of damage. The Fire Department focused on saving the open bleachers on the south field and the main portion of the lumber yard by keeping the piles of lumber wet.

The Fire Chief, Frank J. Wagner, was on a business trip to New York City. He was on his way back to Washington, D.C., when the fire started. His train happened to pass in through the Eckington Yards only a few blocks from the fire and he could see the smoke and flames. He got in a car at Washington Union Station to arrive in time to take charge after his deputy had announced the fire was under control. The fire had attracted large crowds causing 7th, U and 9th Streets NW to be shut down to traffic. The reserves of almost every police precinct needed to be called in to contain the crowds.

=== Aftermath ===
The baseball field suffered $18,000 worth of damage in the half hour fire. The clubhouse in the northeast corner and a portion of the open bleachers in left-field were saved. A meeting of the directors of the club was held that afternoon to discuss the future of the field. The option to start the season on the old Union League grounds or have Boston or New York host the opening series of the games at their parks were considered.

Plans for an extension of the park had been started over a year before the fire. A site located at Florida Avenue and 7th Street NW had been purchased to build a structure similar to Shibe Park in Philadelphia or Forbes Field in Pittsburgh. However, it had been decided to postpone this project until the end of the season.

The structure was rebuilt in steel and concrete as the ballpark that later was known as Griffith Stadium. Exactly four weeks after the Washington fire, New York's Polo Grounds would also be destroyed by fire and rebuilt with steel and concrete, further accelerating the end of the era of wooden major league ballparks.

| Preceded by First park | Home of the American Association/National League; Washington Senators; 1891 – 1899 | Succeeded by Last park |
| Preceded by American League Park | Home of the American League; Washington Senators; 1904 – 1910 | Succeeded by Griffith Stadium |
| Preceded by First park | Home of the United States Congressional Baseball Game; 1909 | Succeeded by Georgetown Field |
