= West Virginia Avenue =

Street in Washington, DC

- West Virginia Avenue NE
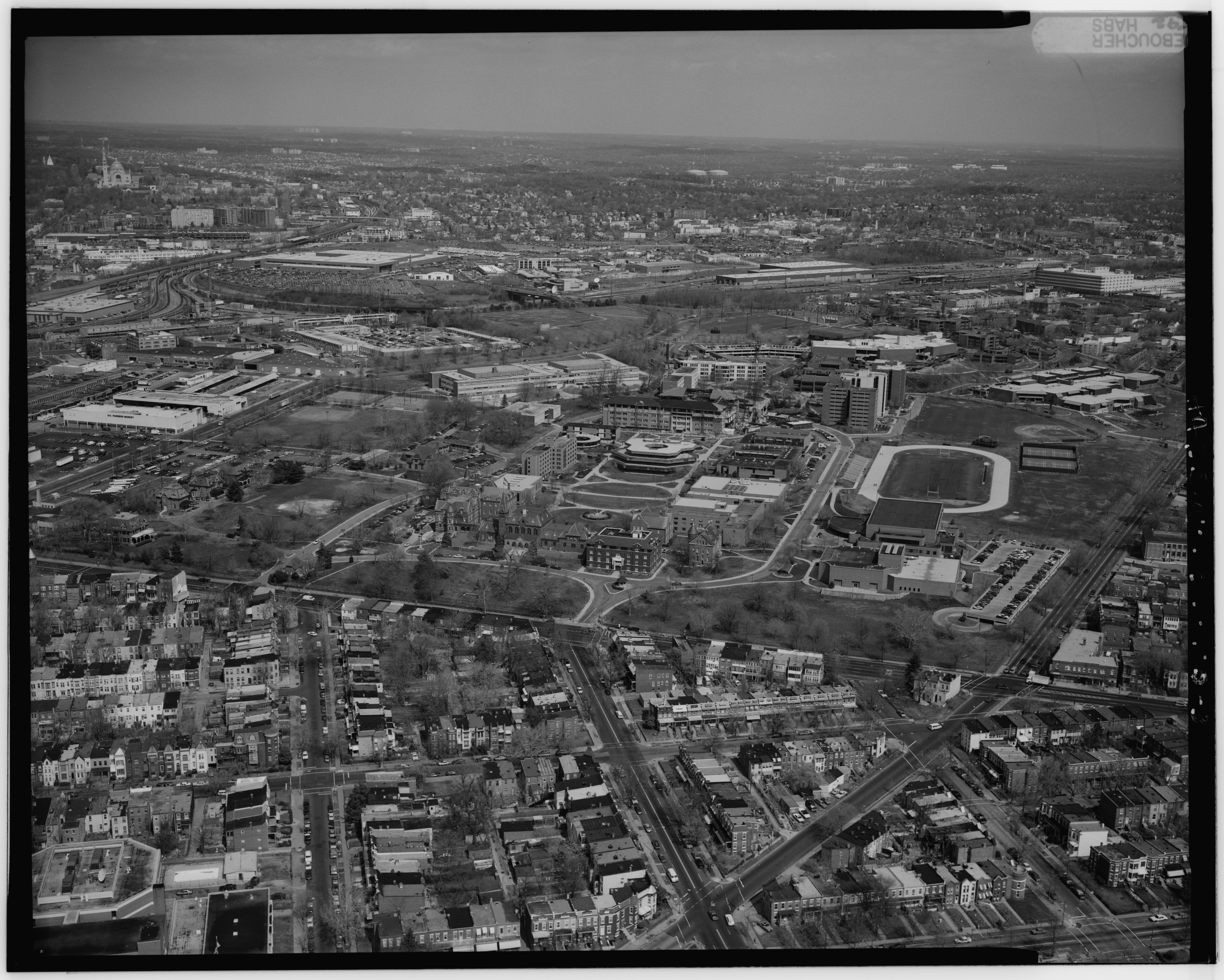
- West Virginia Avenue running on the right of Gallaudet University
- Interactive map of West Virginia Avenue
- Maintained by: DDOT
- Location: Washington, D.C., U.S.
- Coordinates: 38°54′35″N 76°59′10″W
- South end: 8th Street & K Street NE
- Major junctions: Florida Avenue NE; Mount Olivet Road NE
- North end: New York Avenue NE

West Virginia Avenue is an avenue in Washington, DC running from K Street NE to New York Avenue NE. It was named after the State of West Virginia which entered the Union in 1863.

== Geography ==
West Virginia Avenue is located in the northeast quadrant of Washington DC. It runs from K Street NE to New York Avenue NE on a south-west to north-east axis. It intersects Florida Avenue as it exits the original design of Washington, D.C., as designed by L'Enfant. It runs in the northern part of the Near North East neighborhood and is the border for the neighborhoods of Trinidad and Ivy City. It runs adjacent to Gallaudet University and Mount Olivet Cemetery.

== History ==
The avenue was not part of L'Enfant Plan. A large section north of Florida Avenue is located outside of his original design and the southern part cuts into blocks part of the plan. Prior to its installation, the only accesses out of the city were through Delaware Avenue where it crossed Florida Avenue (then known as Boundary Street) and at Maryland Avenue.

The path follows a railway track that ran the same course going from Delaware Avenue NE, down I Street NE and then heading northeast out of the city. The railroad track was owned by the Baltimore and Ohio Railroad and was going to Baltimore. The area north of Boundary Road was made of fields with no significant structure until the late 19th century.

In 1857, the Columbia Institution for the Instruction of the Deaf and Dumb and the Blind (later renamed Gallaudet University) opened on the northern side of the railroad track off and Boundary Street. By 1893, several streets had been developed east of the track where the Trinidad neighborhood stood and the section north of Boundary Street was used to access the neighborhoods of Ivy City and Montello.

In 1907, after many years of negotiations between the federal government, the railway companies and local citizen's groups, Union Station opened. It became the only train station in the city where all trains entered the city. As a result, the previous railway tracks were no longer needed and were abandoned, as the new railway tracks followed Delaware Avenue NE out of the city.

The local community saw an opportunity to build an access road out of the city on that same path. On October 21, 1909, the Northern Suburban Citizens' Association assembled in Langdon Hall passed a resolution to have West Virginia Avenue be improved as a public thoroughfare from 22nd Street NE to Florida Avenue and for sewer pipes to be installed. The following year, the Associations asked the District Commissioners to use the unexpended balances of appropriation to resurface the avenue on the same distance. The Northeast Washington Citizens' Association joined in to request that West Virginia Avenue be a thoroughfare as it would be the only one in that area.

Baltimore & Ohio Railroad's 10,000-foot (3,048 m) right of way was deeded to the United States on February 12, 1901. Of this, 9,000 feet (2,743 m) was made into West Virginia Avenue by 1910, and some of the remainder had been made into parks.

=== The property yard ===
By the end of 1910, a bill was pending in the House to get the remaining. The District Commissioners objected to giving up about 600 feet (183 m) of that right of way that was used as a property yard on square 857 between 6th Street and 7th Street NE. They argued that the land was needed for storage in the area. While they agreed that piles of stones and broken down carts were unsightly they argued that this would one day be hidden with a brick wall. In addition, if it was given up, the traffic from that avenue would end up on I Street that does not have an exit passage at Union Station, unlike K Street which goes under the tracks.

On February 1, 1911, Acting Attorney General William R. Harr announced that the Commissioners had no authority over the piece of land used for the yard. The Department of Justice determined that since the strip of land was vested to the United States, the commissioners only had authority to police it. This decision was forwarded to the Senate District Committee. This was a major victory for the citizens. The Senate gave its approval on the resolution a few days later.

On April 10, 1911, Senator Duncan U. Fletcher of Florida introduced a bill "to construct a West Virginia avenue out of the strip of land extending in a northeasterly direction from the intersection of 6th and I streets northeast to Florida avenue". By May, the ballasts, ties, and rails had been removed from Florida Avenue NE to Mount Olivet Street NE, and the ties and rails were gone from Mount Olivet Street NE onward going north. While it was only a muddy path with no pavement, it was used by wagons to connect the communities north to the city, and it was a straight line looking straight at the Capitol. South of Florida Avenue, the old railway roadbed had been flanked by fences on the back of the properties built on either side.

The Commissioners responded and argued again that K Street NE was the street that should be used, as it was already wide and developed, unlike I Street. They said that extending West Virginia to I Street would have led to the removal of the yard, which would need to be relocated somewhere else in the area at an estimated cost of $50,000 with a waste of $10,000 from the improvements that have already taken place on the lot. They said that would have been a damage to the public.

In the House of Representatives, Adam B. Littlepage of West Virginia introduced a bill for the removal of the yard and the extension of West Virginia Avenue from K Street NE to I Street NE. It was met with the same opposition from the District Commissioners.

== Today ==
The Avenue was not extended to I Street NE. Nevertheless, the block on which the property lot was located between 6th Street NE, 7th Street NE, K Street NE and I Street NE (Square 857) retains traces of the old layout in the patch of the alley on 7th Street NE in the same line as West Virginia Avenue.

Gallaudet University and the Mount Olivet Cemetery are still located in West Virginia Avenue. It is also home to the District of Columbia Department of Public Works Fleet Management Administration Vehicle Maintenance Complex where the 3,000 vehicles of the District of Columbia Government are repaired and services with the exception of police, fire, corrections and schools vehicles. However it fuels all of the 6,000 vehicles.
