= U.S. Route 50 in the District of Columbia =

Highway in Washington, D.C.

U.S. Route 50
- US 50 highlighted in red

Route information
- Maintained by DDOT
- Length: 7.7 mi (12.4 km)

Major junctions
- West end: I-66 / US 50 in Rosslyn, VA
- I-66 in Foggy Bottom; US 1 in Downtown Washington; I-395 in Mount Vernon Square
- East end: US 50 near Cheverly, MD

Location
- Country: United States
- Federal district: District of Columbia

Highway system
- United States Numbered Highway System; List; Special; Divided; Streets and Highways of Washington, DC; Interstate; US; DC; State-Named Streets
← US 29	→ I-66

U.S. Route 50 (US 50) is a major east–west route of the U.S. Highway System, stretching just over 3,000 miles (4,800 km) from Ocean City, Maryland, on the Atlantic Ocean, to West Sacramento, California, nearly to the Pacific Ocean. In Washington, D.C., US 50 passes between Arlington County, Virginia, and Prince George's County, Maryland, predominantly along surface streets, including a part of Constitution Avenue along the National Mall.

== Route description ==
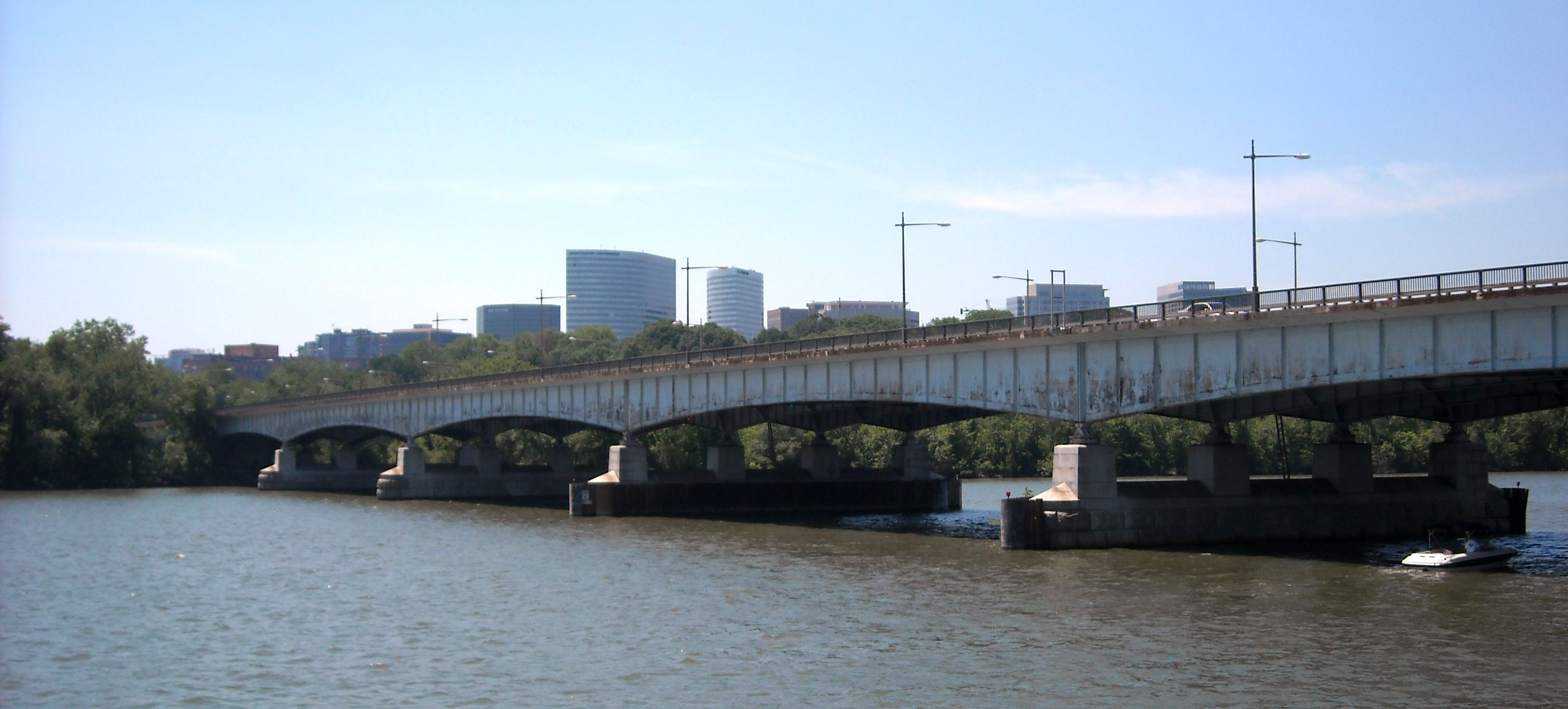
The Theodore Roosevelt Bridge over the Potomac River on I-66 and US 50, with the Rosslyn area of Arlington, Virginia, along the riverbank

US 50 enters Washington, D.C. from Arlington, Virginia, merging with I-66 on the Theodore Roosevelt Bridge over the Potomac River. US 50 traffic exits I-66 onto Constitution Avenue along the north side of the National Mall, passing the Lincoln Memorial, the Vietnam Veterans Memorial, the White House, the World War II Memorial, and the Washington Monument, then traveling between Federal Triangle's office buildings on the north and the Smithsonian Institution's National Museum of African American History and Culture, National Museum of American History, National Museum of Natural History, and a National Gallery of Art sculpture garden to its south.

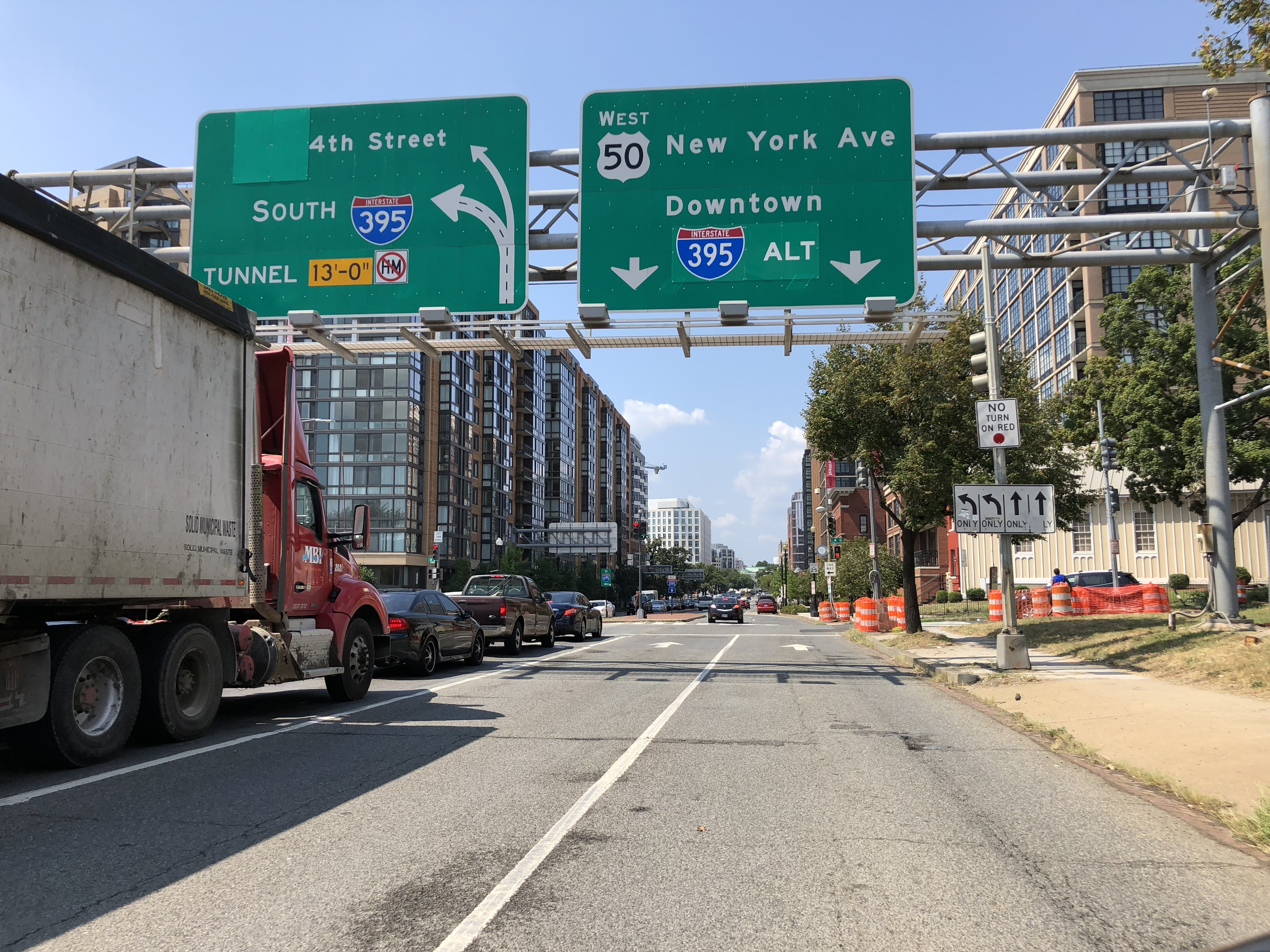
View west along US 50 at I-395

Near the National Gallery of Art, US 50 turns left on 6th Street NW, and after several blocks, right onto New York Avenue NW. The northern terminus of I-395 is at a signaled intersection with New York Avenue and 4th Street NW. At that intersection, traffic from New York Avenue in either direction may turn south onto I-395, but traffic on northbound I-395 may turn only right (east) onto New York Avenue, but not west toward Downtown Washington. US 1 northbound runs concurrently with US 50 along Constitution Avenue NW from 14th Street NW to 6th Street NW, and along 6th Street NW from Constitution Avenue NW to New York Avenue NW.

The route continues northeast on New York Avenue through Northeast Washington, passing the United States National Arboretum. US 1 Alt. is concurrent with US 50 along New York Avenue between 6th Street NW and Bladensburg Road. Beyond the Arboretum, New York Avenue becomes a freeway, with an off-level interchange with South Dakota Avenue in the Fort Lincoln area. US 50 then crosses the Anacostia River and continues into Maryland, where it becomes the John Hanson Highway and interchanges with the Baltimore-Washington Parkway.

== History ==
The New York Avenue Industrial Freeway, if built, would have replaced New York Avenue as US 50 east of I-395.

== Major intersections ==
All exits are unnumbered.

Location	mi	km	Destinations	Notes
Potomac River	0.0	0.0	US 50 west (Arlington Boulevard)	Continuation into Virginia
Potomac River	0.2	0.32	George Washington Parkway north	Westbound exit only
Potomac River	0.2	0.32	I-66 west	Western end of the concurrency with I-66; westbound exit and eastbound entrance
Potomac River	0.2– 0.5	0.32– 0.80	Eastern end of the Theodore Roosevelt Bridge	
Foggy Bottom			Independence Avenue	Eastbound exit and westbound entrance
Foggy Bottom	0.6	0.97	I-66 east / E Street Expressway	Eastern end of the concurrency with I-66; eastbound exit and westbound entrance
Foggy Bottom	0.8	1.3	23rd Street NW	Eastern end of the freeway section
National Mall	1.8	2.9	US 1 south (14th Street NW) to I-395 south	Western end of the concurrency with US 1
National Mall	2.0	3.2	12th Street Expressway	Northern end of the one-way expressway; inbound access only
National Mall	2.2	3.5	9th Street Expressway to I-395	Northern end of the one-way expressway; outbound access only
Downtown	2.5	4.0	US 1 Alt. north (Pennsylvania Ave)	Southern terminus of US 1 Alt.; no direct southbound access
Mount Vernon Square	3.2	5.1	US 1 north (6th Street NW)	Eastern end of the concurrency with US 1
Mount Vernon Square	3.4	5.5	I-395 south (3rd Street Tunnel) / 4th Street NW	Northern terminus of I-395; future I-195; 4th Street NW is a one-way street, southbound access only
NoMa	3.8	6.1	North Capitol Street	Grade-separated interchange (also crosses the New York Avenue Bridge)
Gateway	6.0	9.7	US 1 Alt. (Bladensburg Road) to US 1 north – Bladensburg MD	(also crosses the New York Avenue Bridge)
Gateway	6.7	10.8	36th Place NE	Western end of freeway section; eastbound exit and entrance
Fort Lincoln	7.1	11.4	South Dakota Avenue (EB) South Dakota Avenue, Fort Lincoln Drive (WB)	No westbound entrance
Anacostia Park	7.7	12.4	US 50 east – Annapolis	Continuation into Maryland
1.000 mi = 1.609 km; 1.000 km = 0.621 mi: Concurrency terminus; Incomplete access

U.S. Route 50
Previous state: Virginia	District of Columbia	Next state: Maryland
