= Trinidad (Washington, D.C.) =

- Neighborhood of Washington, D.C.
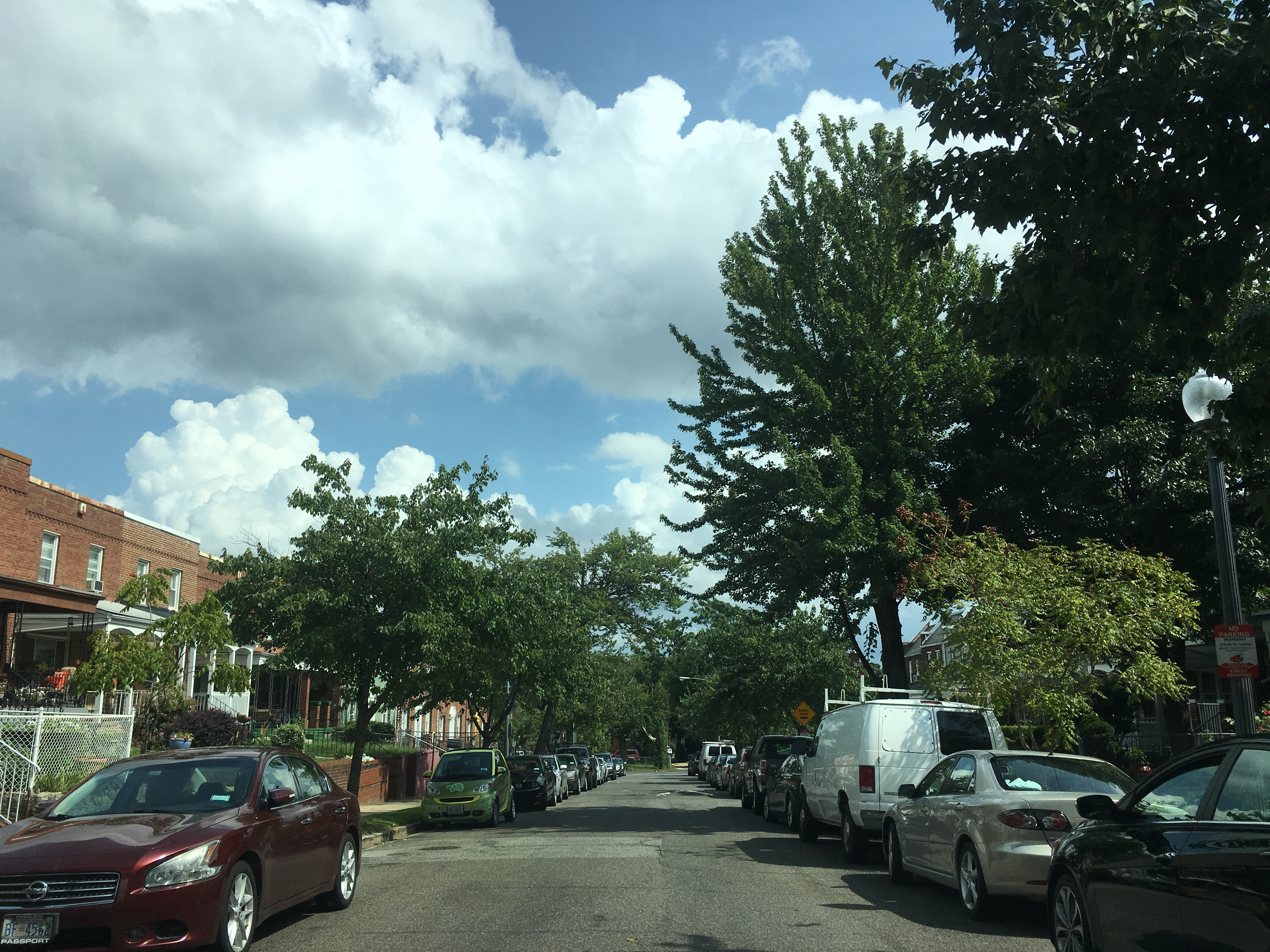
- Etymology: the island of Trinidad
- Interactive map of Trinidad
- Coordinates: 38.9057°N 76.9844°W
- Country: United States
- District: Washington, D.C.
- Ward: Ward 5

Government
  - Councilmember: Zachary Parker
- Postal code: ZIP code

Trinidad is a neighborhood located in Ward 5, in the northeast quadrant of Washington, D.C., and is a largely residential area. It is bounded by West Virginia Avenue NE, Florida Avenue NE, Mount Olivet Road NE, and Bladensburg Road NE.

== Geography ==
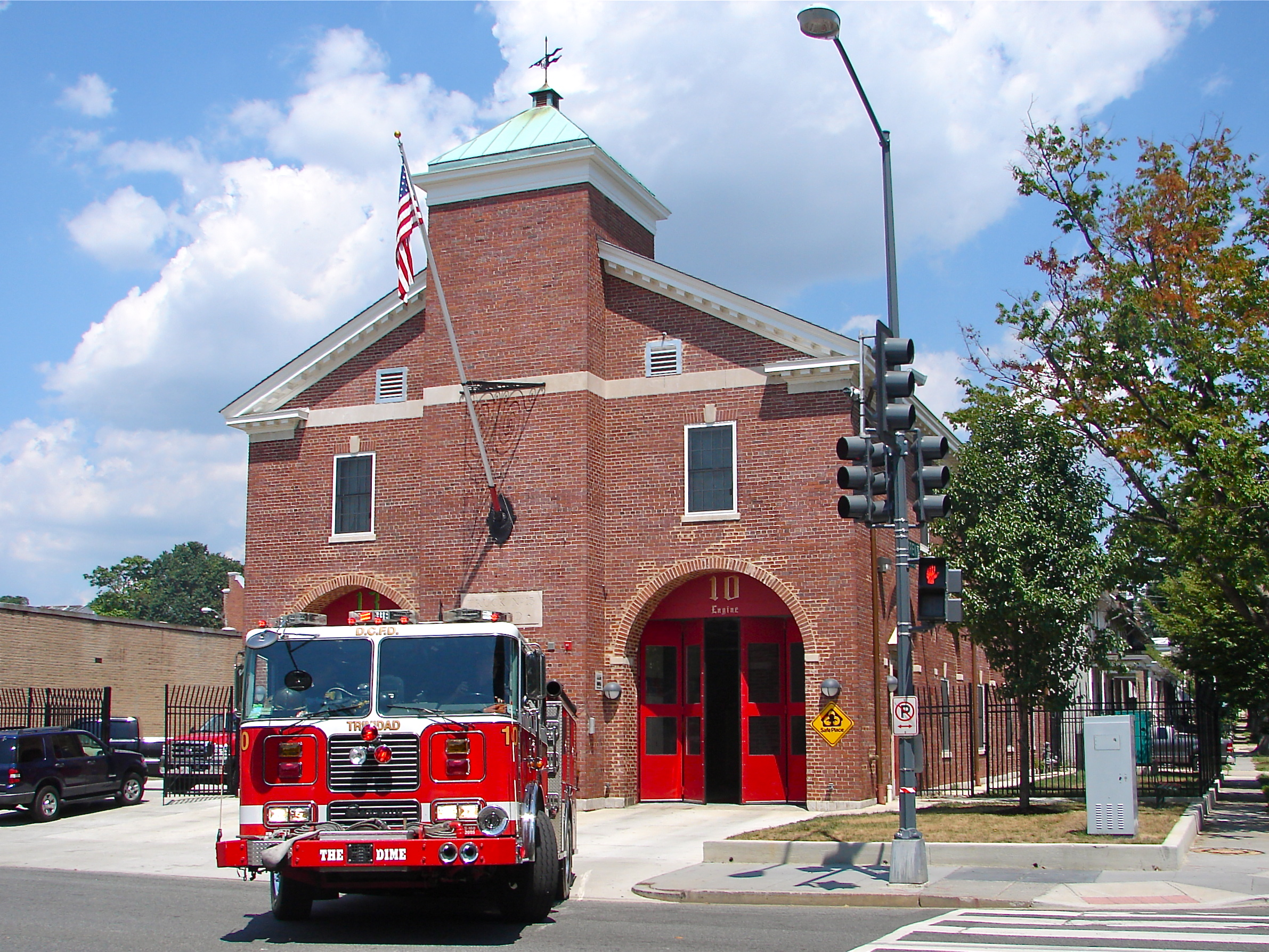
A historic Trinidad firehouse on Florida Avenue, NE

Trinidad is to the east of West Virginia Avenue, north of Florida Avenue, and west of Bladensburg Road. To the north of Trinidad is the more industrial neighborhood of Ivy City. To the west is Gallaudet University and the Florida Market (D.C.'s wholesale food district, also called the Capital City Market or more recently Union Market). To the east lies Carver Langston. To the south of Trinidad is Old City, so named because it was part of Pierre L'Enfant's original plan for the city, and generally referred to as either Near Northeast or Capitol Hill North. Located immediately south of Trinidad is the H Street Corridor. The eastern portion of the H Street Corridor is sometimes referred to as the Atlas District, part of a neighborhood branding campaign centered on the revitalized Atlas Theater.

== History ==
The area got its name from 19th-century speculator James Barry, who had once lived on the Caribbean island of Trinidad. A street in the neighborhood bears the name of Trinidad Avenue NE.

The land passed to and from the Corcoran family, who used it as a country estate, to Columbian College, which later became George Washington University, and then to the Washington Brick Machine Company. The brickworks intended to excavate clay from the land, but not needing all of the land, began selling off parcels, and, in the late 19th century, the first houses in southern Trinidad were built.

The American League Park was located at the corner of Florida Ave NE and Trinidad Avenue NE from 1901 to 1904. It was home to the Washington Senators.

In 2008, Trinidad was at the center of a significant constitutional battle. In response to crime, the Metropolitan Police Department instituted a series of checkpoints to screen those traveling into the neighborhood and turn away anyone without a "legitimate purpose" to be there. The Court of Appeals for the District of Columbia Circuit ruled in 2009 that the checkpoints were unconstitutional and violated the Fourth Amendment's prohibition on unreasonable search and seizure.

== Architecture ==
The first two blocks north of Florida Avenue feature classic Victorian rowhouses similar to those in nearby Capitol Hill. Further north, many of the row houses are built in a flat porch-fronted style (similar to craftsman style) that gained popularity during the 1920s. Northern portions of Trinidad were developed later, some parts as late as the 1940s.

== Education ==
Crummel Elementary School is located in Ivy City.

=== Wheatley Education Campus ===
Wheatley Education Campus is a public school that serves grades PK-8. It is located at 1299 Neal Street NE.

=== Center City PCS Trinidad Campus ===
Center City PCS Trinidad is a public charter school that serves grades PK-8. It is located at 1217 West Virginia Ave, NE. It was the Holy Name School.

=== Joel Elias Spingarn Senior High School ===
Joel Elias Spingarn Senior High School is located at 2500 Benning Road NE.

=== Gallaudet University ===
Gallaudet University is a university for the deaf and hard of hearing. It is located at 800 Florida Avenue NE.

=== KIPP DC College Preparatory ===
KIPP DC College Preparatory goes from 9th to 12th grade and is located at 1405 Brentwood Parkway NE.

== Transportation ==
=== Washington Metro ===
Trinidad is served by the NoMa – Gallaudet University Metro station on the Red Line of the Washington Metro.

=== Metrobus ===
Trinidad is served by Metrobus routes B2, D4 and D8 and X3.

== Crime ==
Crime was a significant problem in Trinidad in the late 1980s and early 1990s. In 2007 and 2008, an abnormal rash of gun violence in the neighborhood resulted in police checkpoints, which were declared unconstitutional by the federal Court of Appeals for the D.C. Circuit in 2009.

== Gallery ==
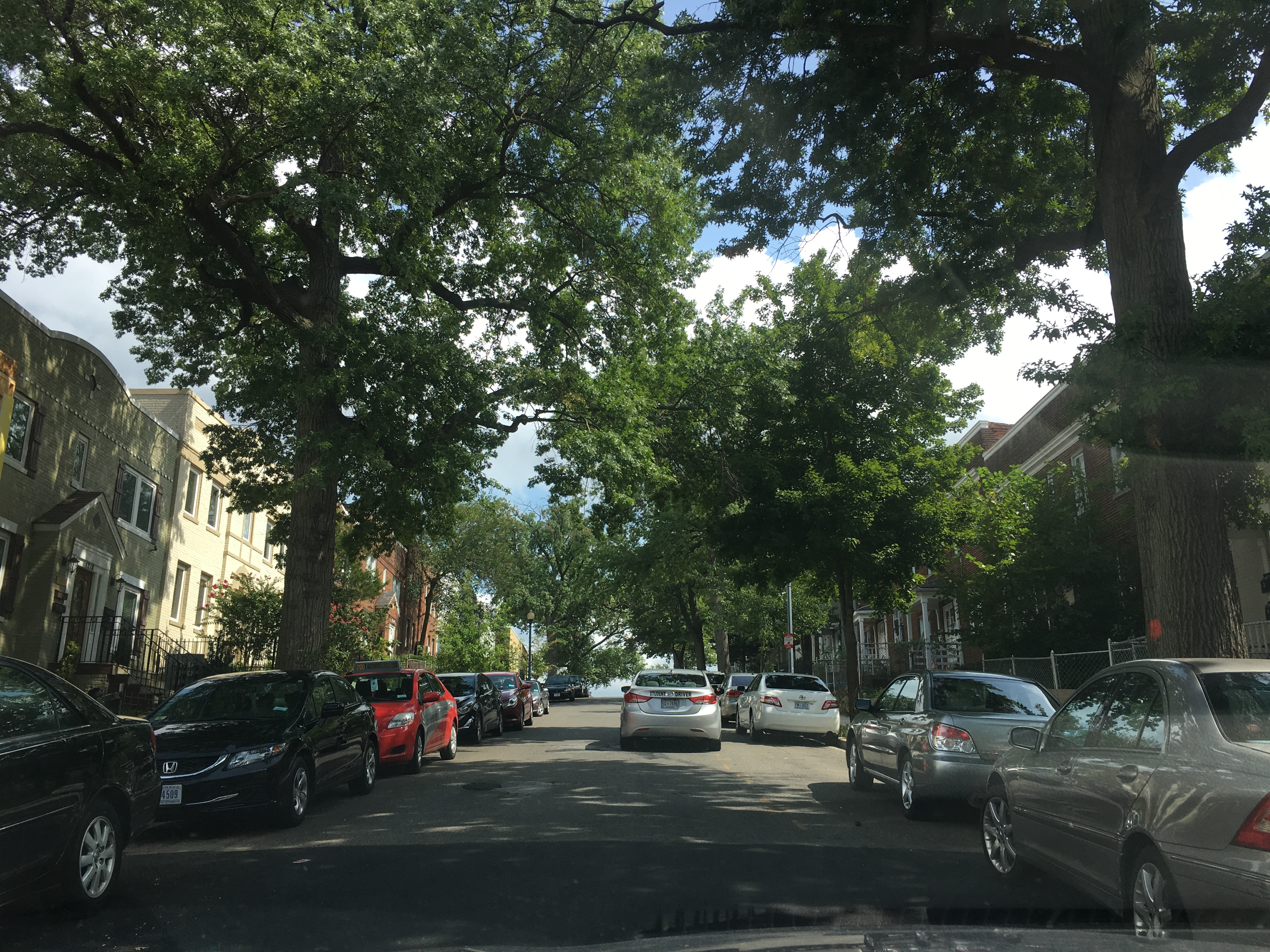
Intersection of Montello Ave. and Queen St. NE (2018)

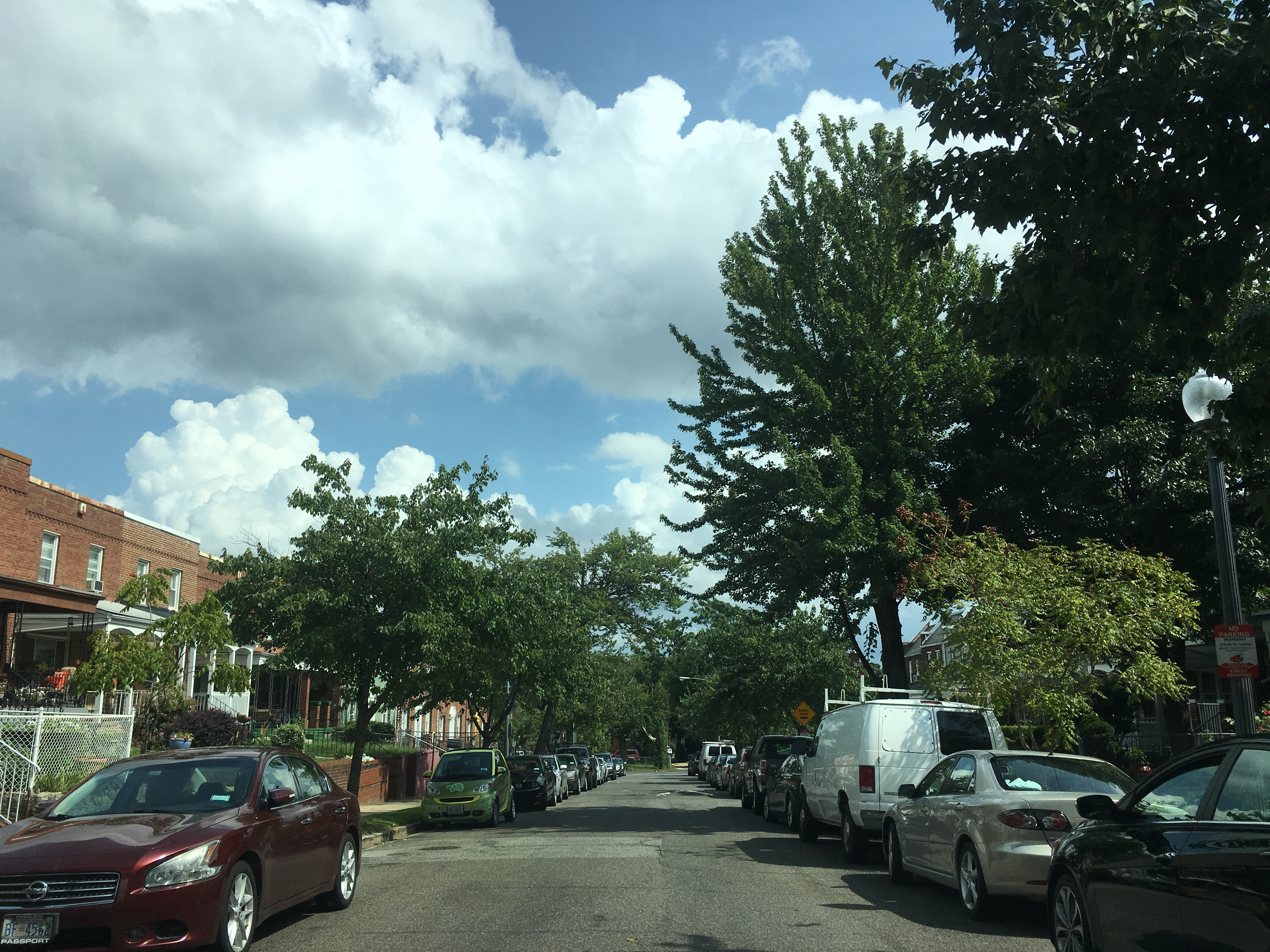
Intersection of Trinidad Ave. and Queen St. NE (2018)
