= New York Avenue (Washington, D.C.) =

Street in Washington, DC

- New York Avenue NE; New York Avenue NW
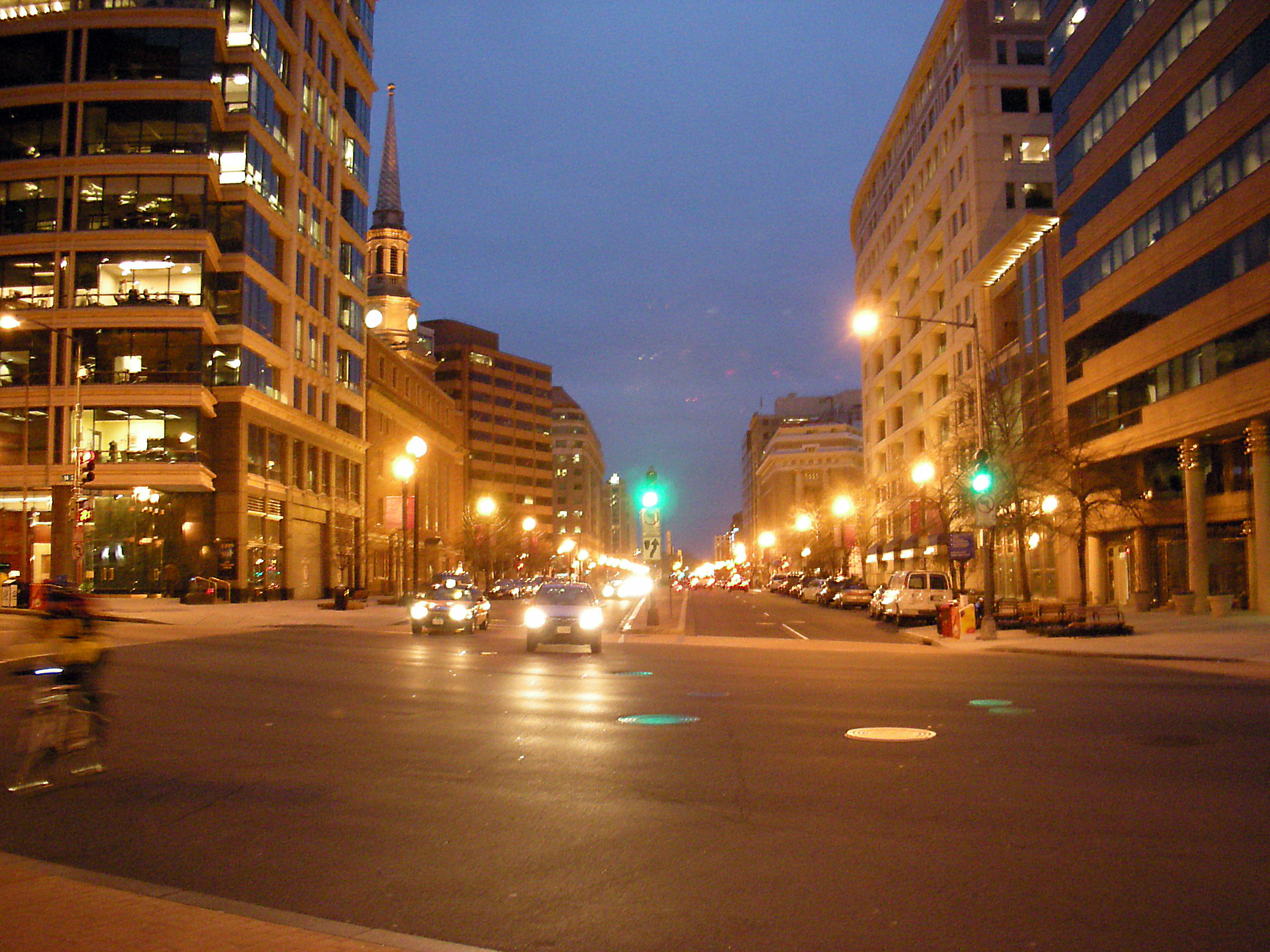
- New York Avenue and 14th Street NW in Washington, D.C.
- Interactive map of New York Avenue
- Maintained by: DDOT
- Location: Washington, D.C., U.S.
- Coordinates: 38°54′12.6″N 77°1′11.6″W
- West end: 18th Street NW
- Major junctions: 14th / H Streets NW; Mount Vernon Square; US 1 / US 50 (6th Street NW); I-395; North Capitol Street; Florida Avenue NE; US 1 Alt. (Bladensburg Road); South Dakota Avenue NE
- East end: US 50 (John Hanson Highway)

New York Avenue is a diagonal avenue radiating northeast from the White House in Washington, D.C. to the border with Maryland. It is a major east–west route in the city's Northwest and Northeast quadrants and connects downtown with points east and north of the city via Cheverly, Maryland, the John Hanson Highway, the Baltimore–Washington Parkway, and eventually, Interstate 95.

== History ==
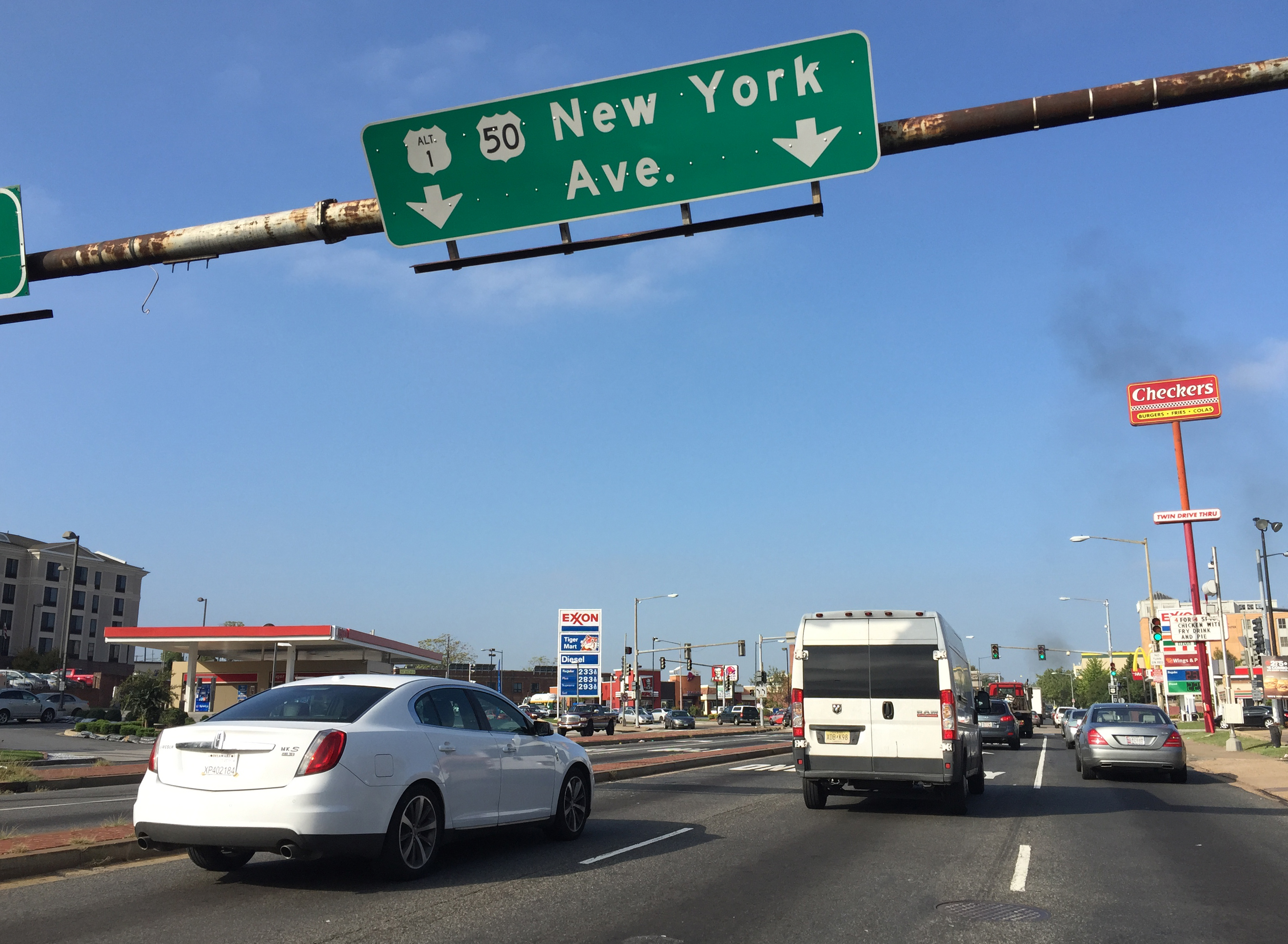
New York Avenue and Bladensburg Road, the first traffic light on New York Avenue after entering Washington, D.C.

New York Avenue was planned as one of the original streets in the L'Enfant Plan for Washington, D.C. It was intended to begin at the Potomac River and extend northeast toward the White House, then continue past the Executive Residence northeast to the city's boundary with Maryland. The portion of the street southwest of the White House was to give the President of the United States an uninterrupted view of the Potomac River. Construction on the State, War, and Navy Building from 1871 to 1888 blocked this view, and it remains blocked to this day. It extended to the grounds of the U.S. Naval Observatory, but the construction of Rawlins Park in 1873 destroyed a block of New York Avenue between 18th and 19th Streets NW.

New York Avenue's consolidation with Triangle Park and three other parklets into a small mall in 1937 consumed another block between 20th and 21st Streets NW. Construction of the United States Department of War Building (now the Harry S Truman Building, housing the United States Department of State), and an associated park (since January 1959, known as Edward J. Kelly Park) from 1940 to 1941 destroyed the lower three blocks of New York Avenue. Construction of the Theodore Roosevelt Building (which now houses the United States Office of Personnel Management) in 1963 eliminated another block between 19th and 20th Streets NW. This left a single block of New York Avenue NW, between 17th and 18th Streets NW, southeast of the White House.

New York Avenue northeast of the White House retains its uninterrupted character. It originally terminated at Boundary Avenue (now Florida Avenue NE, as all city streets did in the L'Enfant Plan. Extensive development occurred beyond Boundary Avenue from 1870 to 1900. Extension of New York Avenue to Bladensburg Road was considered as early as 1899. But no action was taken. The McMillan Plan, a master plan for the capital published in 1901, strongly endorsed extension of the street. But although many portions of the plan were acted on, no road construction occurred. Plans were drawn up in 1903 to extend the street about 1-mile (1.6 km) beyond the "city limits" to reach the Ivy City development, but these, too, fell through. In 1907, as construction of Union Station was under way, the Baltimore and Ohio Railroad (B&O) created a diversion track (beginning at Ivy City) so that its passenger trains could reach the new station. As part of this effort, the B&O was required to build a bridge to carry New York Avenue over its new track route, extending New York Avenue to Fourth Street NE. The B&O built the bridge and extension, but the bridge remained unused for decades.

Extensions to Bladensburg Road were debated again in 1908, and failed. The right of way was purchased in 1914, and property owners along the street route assessed for construction. But no construction occurred. An extension was proposed to South Dakota Avenue NE in 1925 (after land was purchased to found the United States National Arboretum), but these proposals were not acted on. Construction on New York Avenue Extended finally began in September 1930. The $231,000 ($4,348,046 in 2024 dollars) project created a 50-foot (15 m) roadway 2.125 miles (3.420 km) long from Florida Avenue NE to Bladensburg Road NE. There were no intersections with side streets, and only 4th Street NE merged with it. New York Avenue Extended opened on November 2, 1931.

The final section of New York Avenue NE (known as New York Avenue Extended), from Bladensburg Road to the District-Maryland border and the connection with U.S. Route 50, opened in October 1954. The construction of Route 50 was a joint effort of the state of Maryland (which built the northern half) and the federal government (which constructed the southern half). The District of Columbia paid to have New York Avenue extended to the connection. A "gateway" to the city was proposed at this time, but no gateway was built. This section of the avenue was not well-planned. At the bridge over South Dakota Avenue and the railroad track just a few hundred feet westward, New York Avenue narrowed from three lanes to two, creating major back-ups.

The fate of New York Avenue NE was sealed with the cancellation of the Northeast Freeway in 1977, which was intended to provide a more direct route for traffic between downtown Washington and Baltimore along the Interstate 95 corridor. The loss of the Northeast Freeway left New York Avenue NE, U.S. Route 50, and the Baltimore-Washington Parkway as the best route to get in and out of downtown Washington from the northeast. The main advantage of New York Avenue NE is that drivers need only put up with about two-and-a-half miles (4 km) of traffic lights between downtown Washington and the last traffic light at Bladensburg Road, while the distance between downtown Washington and the closest controlled-access freeway is more than twice as far for the two next best alternative routes, MD 650 and MD 500/MD 410.

=== Major reconstructions ===
New York Avenue NW and NE within the boundary of the old Federal City has generally remained in good to excellent condition. The city rebuilt New York Avenue between 9th and 15th Streets NW from 1992 to 1994.

New York Avenue NE beyond Florida Avenue NE, however, has had serious degradation issues. This section of the roadway saw only minor repairs until the mid 1980s, when major portions of the road began to fail. In 1987, a complete reconstruction of New York Avenue NE from Bladensburg Road to South Dakota Avenue occurred. The lower portion of the street did not receive major repairs, and by 1990 was listed by the city (along with South Capitol Street) as one of the worst for potholes.

In 1995, the District of Columbia Department of Transportation (DDOT) estimated that New York Avenue Extended carried 107,000 vehicles each day. By 1997, this had risen to 135,000 vehicles every day. The road was D.C.'s most heavily trafficked; only the 14th Street Bridge and the Southeast-Southwest Freeway (I-395) were more traveled. It was also the city's most-used commercial corridor, as semi-trailer trucks were twice as likely to use New York Avenue to enter the city than any other street.

In the spring of 1998, the city announced a two-year, $24.7 million ($47,650,122 in 2024 dollars) project reconstructed New York Avenue from South Dakota Avenue to the District line. The two bridges which created two-lane traffic jams were replaced and the roadway widened to three lanes in each direction. The ramps connecting South Dakota Avenue with New York Avenue were also replaced. A new roadway design, which incorporated a 10-inch (25 cm) reinforced concrete road surface, was used on this section of the street. The project also installed new street and traffic lighting and improved storm water drainage. Design and delays in obtaining federal funding kept the project on the ground until March 1999. Traffic barriers were used to create reversible lanes, to alleviate rush hour problems. The work proved more difficult than planned, and was not complete until June 2002. For reasons which remain unclear, the bridge over the railroad tracks near South Dakota Avenue NE was not replaced, and the two-lane bottleneck continued.

As the 1999 reconstruction project continued, the section of New York Avenue from South Dakota Avenue to Bladensburg Road was repaved to remove bumpy asphalt. All three inbound lanes were closed at the same time, as the city experimented with what it called a "full-bore approach" in repaving. Fort Myer Construction handled the $700,000 ($1,243,056 in 2024 dollars) job. The new construction method worked, and the avenue reopened on time three days later.

According to a study released in 2005 by the government of the District of Columbia, five of the ten most crash-prone intersections in the city are along New York Avenue. The most crash-prone intersection in the city is at New York Avenue NE and Bladensburg Road NE.

Another major bridge, carrying 9th Street NE over New York Avenue, began replacement in April 2009. The 70-year-old structure carried 26,000 vehicles a day. The two-year, $40 million ($58,625,717 in 2024 dollars) project replaced two-lane, 44-foot (13 m) wide span with a four-lane, 52-foot (16 m) wide structure. Sidewalks were widened from 5-foot (1.5 m) to 9-foot (2.7 m) in width, a median was added, and new crash-resistant railings installed. Delays in other New York Avenue projects allowed the 9th Street NE bridge to begin replacement sooner than expected, and to proceed faster toward completion.

Work on New York Avenue occurred again in the spring of 2010. Single lane closures in both directions occurred as repaving occurred from Bladensburg Road to Florida Avenue. A far more major repair effort began 2011, when the 1907 bridge over the railroad tracks between Florida Avenue NE and Penn Street NE was replaced. The job was a complex one, as the bridge also carried electricity, telecommunication cables, and mechanical equipment critical for railroad operations. The project was ready to begin in 2010, but the complexity of the replacement led to a new replace plan which delayed work a year. Lanes closures in 2011 consisted of a single lane in one direction during rush hour, but expanded to two lanes in each direction in 2012.

== Corridor redevelopment efforts ==
Originally, New York Avenue Extended passed through relatively rural areas, where farms and small, isolated developments were common. But during the road's first 30 years, the area around it transformed into a major industrial corridor. The economic dislocations of the 1970s, however, led to rapid deindustrialization along New York Avenue. By the late 1970s, many industrial businesses along the route were closed or abandoned, and retail was relatively nonexistent. The residents in the surrounding neighborhoods were very poor, unemployment was high, and environmental problems were severe.

In 1980, D.C. Mayor Marion Barry announced a major effort to redevelop the New York Avenue Extended industrial and retail corridor. Little action was taken to implement the plan's goals.

Barry's successor, Sharon Pratt Dixon, announced another redevelopment effort in late 1993. Once more, redevelopment efforts failed to materialize. Barry defeated Dixon in her attempt to win renomination for mayor, and Barry won the general elected held in November 1994.

Barry announced his second effort to redevelop the New York Avenue Extended corridor in July 1995. A more thorough analysis of the corridor found several problems: The roadway was poorly maintained and traffic was far too heavy; the intersection of New York Avenue and Bladensburg Road was a confusing mass of exit and on ramps, medians, and underpasses; poor zoning laws had allowed businesses to erect bright, visually distracting signs; and an excessive number of curb cuts permitted too many motorists to access the road and slow traffic. Barry's plan for the street included plans to induce light manufacturing and blue-collar service businesses to return to the area, adding hundreds of trees to the streetscape to make it more appealing, and reducing traffic congestion. DDOT officials said they were ready to replace the bridge over the railroad tracks near South Dakota Avenue NE but that the city lacked the $16 million ($33,016,816 in 2024 dollars) for the project because federal highway funding had not been forthcoming. DDOT also said it planned to widen the street to four lanes between Bladensburg Road and the District line, and reduce the steepness of the approaches to the overpass over the railroad tracks near Florida Avenue. Business executives said reducing congestion on the road was the key to reviving retail and industry. But once more, little revitalization occurred.

In 2002, D.C. Mayor Anthony A. Williams announced yet another New York Avenue Extended redevelopment initiative. Transportation and economic development officials announced that they were studying plans to reduced congestion on New York Avenue by adding more public transit, such as light rail. They also said they would improve the streetscape by adding bicycle paths, widening sidewalks, and planting more trees and shrubs. The city hired six consulting firms, and paid them $900,000 ($1,573,377 in 2024 dollars) to identify additional problems, survey residents, and propose solutions. The 18-month effort was intended to create a New York Avenue master plan that would guide development in the area for the next 30 to 50 years. The most significant issue immediately identifiable facing the street was the anticipated rise in heavy trucks using the road, due to the presence of the Walter E. Washington Convention Center, Bureau of Alcohol, Tobacco and Firearms headquarters, and several anticipated big-box stores on the street.

In 2004, the New York Ave–Florida Ave–Gallaudet U station opened on the Washington Metro's Red Line, after a group of property owners formed a special assessment district, agreeing to tax themselves to fund construction of the station.

== Route ==
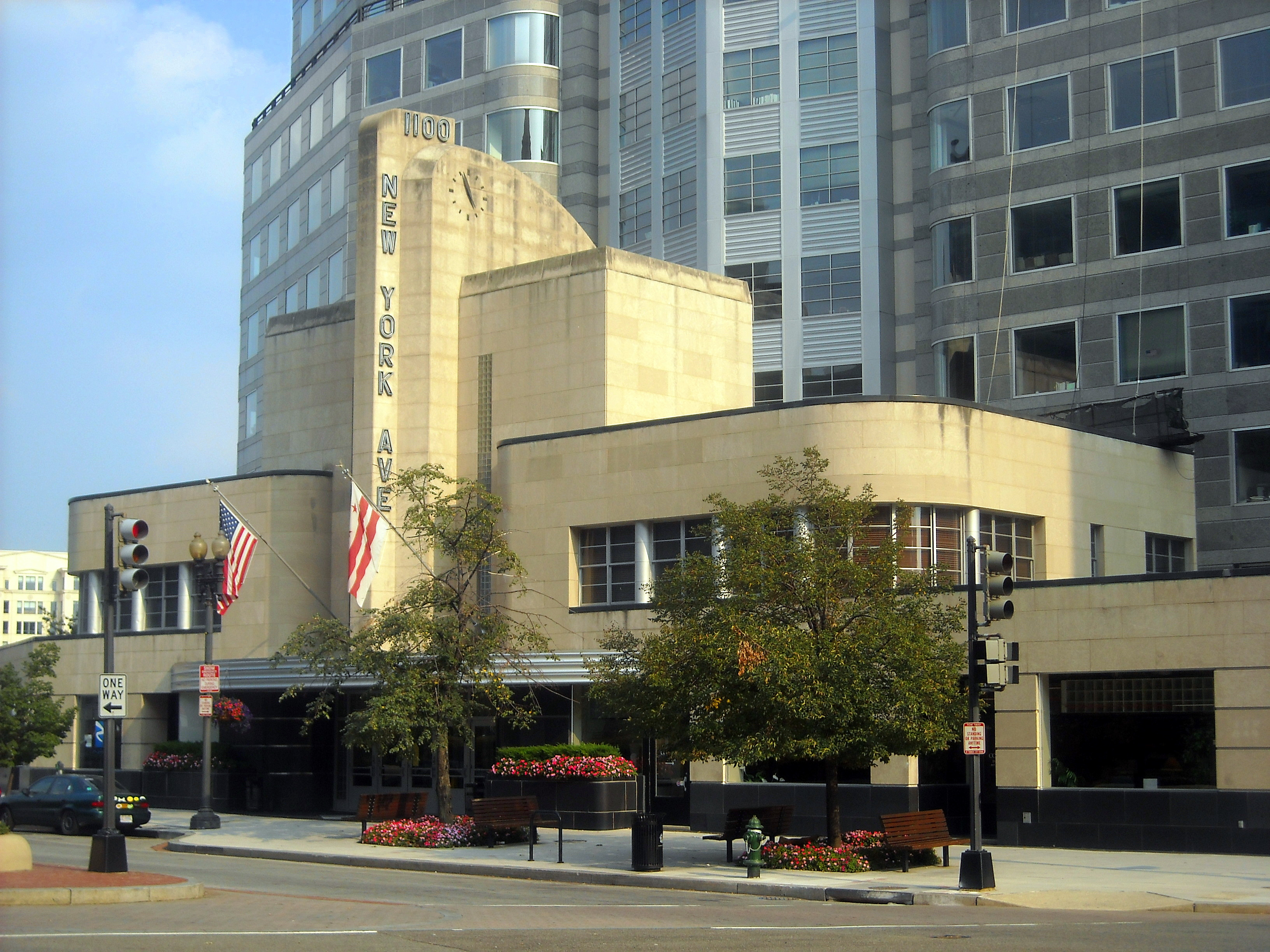
The 1100 New York Avenue building was once a bus depot.

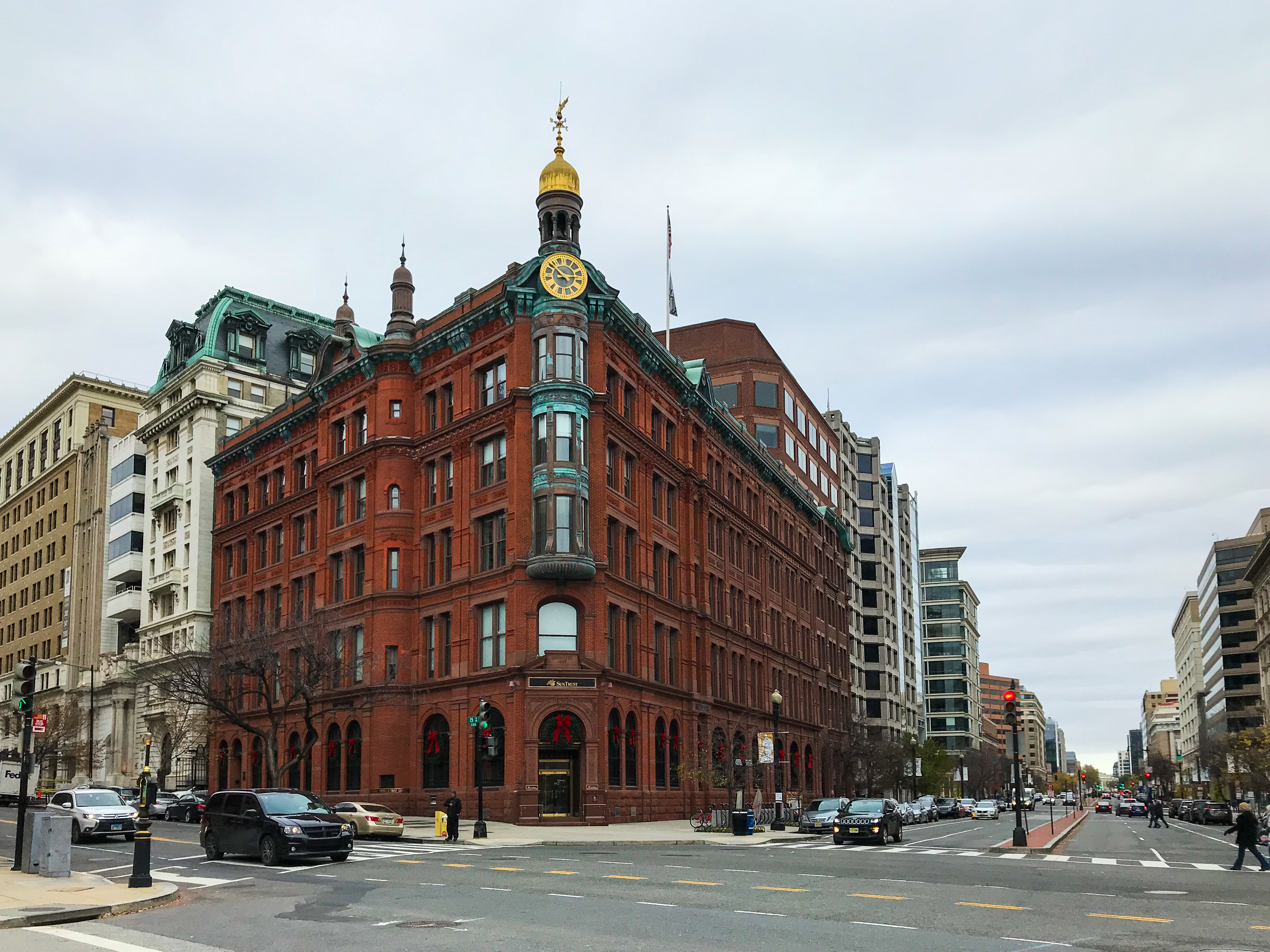
New York Avenue's intersection with 15th Street NW, where the route is interrupted by the Treasury Building and the White House

New York Avenue is U.S. Route 50 from the border with Maryland and into northwest as far west as 6th Street NW. In addition, it is U.S. Route 1 Alternate from Bladensburg Road NE to 6th Street NW. The northern terminus of Interstate 395 is at a signaled intersection with New York Avenue and 4th Street NW. At that intersection, traffic from New York Avenue in either direction may turn south onto Interstate 395, but traffic on northbound Interstate 395 may turn only right (east) onto New York Avenue.

At its eastern end, New York Avenue NE becomes the John Hanson Highway (U.S. Route 50 in Maryland).

On the east side of Mount Vernon Square, New York Avenue crosses 7th Street NW. At Mount Vernon Square, traffic on New York Avenue mixes with traffic on Massachusetts Avenue NW and K Street NW. East of Mount Vernon Square, New York Avenue is part of the National Highway System.

While the main line of New York Avenue extends northeast of the White House, the avenue resumes southwest of the White House to run one block between 17th and 18th Streets NW. At 18th Street NW, New York Avenue joins E Street NW, which leads to the E Street Expressway. That one-block segment of New York Avenue is also part of the National Highway System.

=== Places of interest ===
New York Avenue NE is served by the NoMa – Gallaudet U Station on the Washington Metro. The $103.7 million ($172,632,364 in 2024 dollars) subway stop opened in 2004 as the New York Ave-Florida Ave-Gallaudet U station. Seven years later, Metro gave the stop a new name, NoMa-Gallaudet U, in an effort to broaden the subway station's appeal. (NoMa stands for "North of Massachusetts", an area city officials hoped to transform into a hip arts and retail area.)

Locations of interest on or near New York Avenue include Bureau of Alcohol, Tobacco and Firearms at 99 New York Avenue NE (which opened in 2008), the main entrance of the National Arboretum (including four relocated U.S. Capitol Gateposts and the National Capitol Columns), the Walter E. Washington Convention Center at New York Avenue and 7th Street NW (which opened in 2003), the National Museum of Women in the Arts, the New York Avenue Presbyterian Church, and the Corcoran Gallery of Art.

== Bibliography ==
- Applewhite, E.J. (1993). Washington Itself: An Informal Guide to the Capital of the United States. Lanham, Md.: Madison Books. ISBN 9781461733386.
- Bednar, Michael J. (2006). L'Enfant's Legacy: Public Open Spaces in Washington, D.C. Baltimore: Johns Hopkins University Press. ISBN 9780801883187.
- Miller, Elizabeth J. (1984). "Dreams of Being the Capital of Commerce: The National Fair of 1879". Records of the Columbia Historical Society: 71–82.
