= Ivy City =

Neighborhood in Washington, D.C., U.S.

- Neighborhood
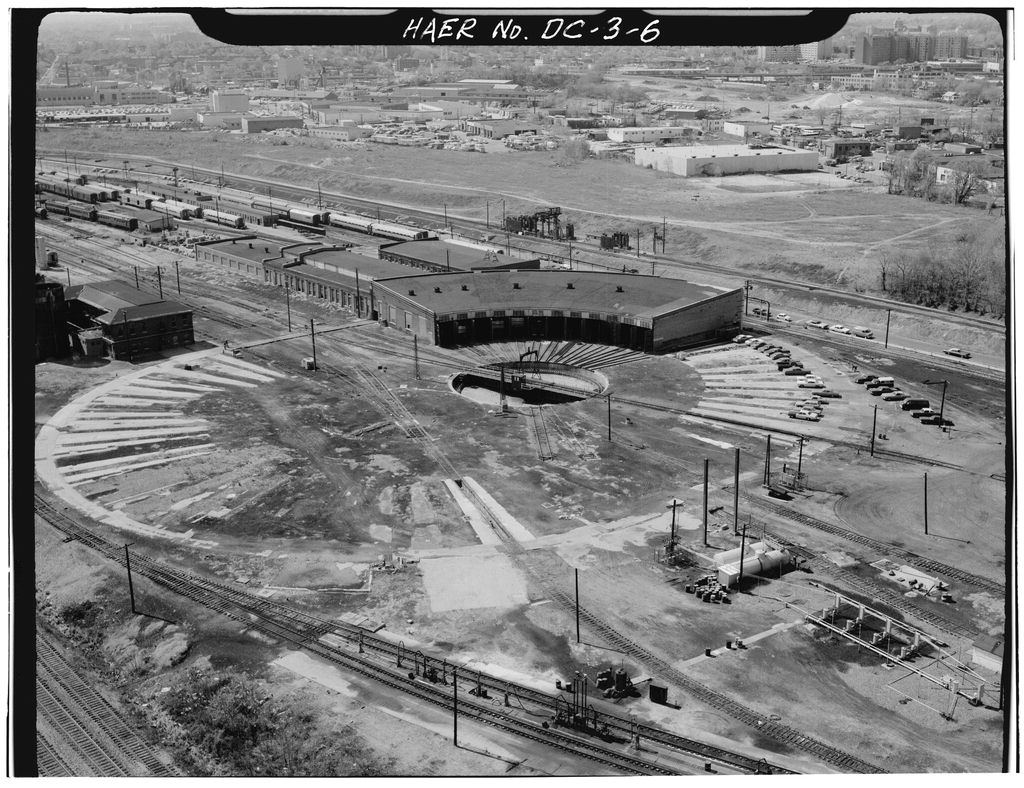
- Ivy City Roundhouse, Washington, D.C., 1977

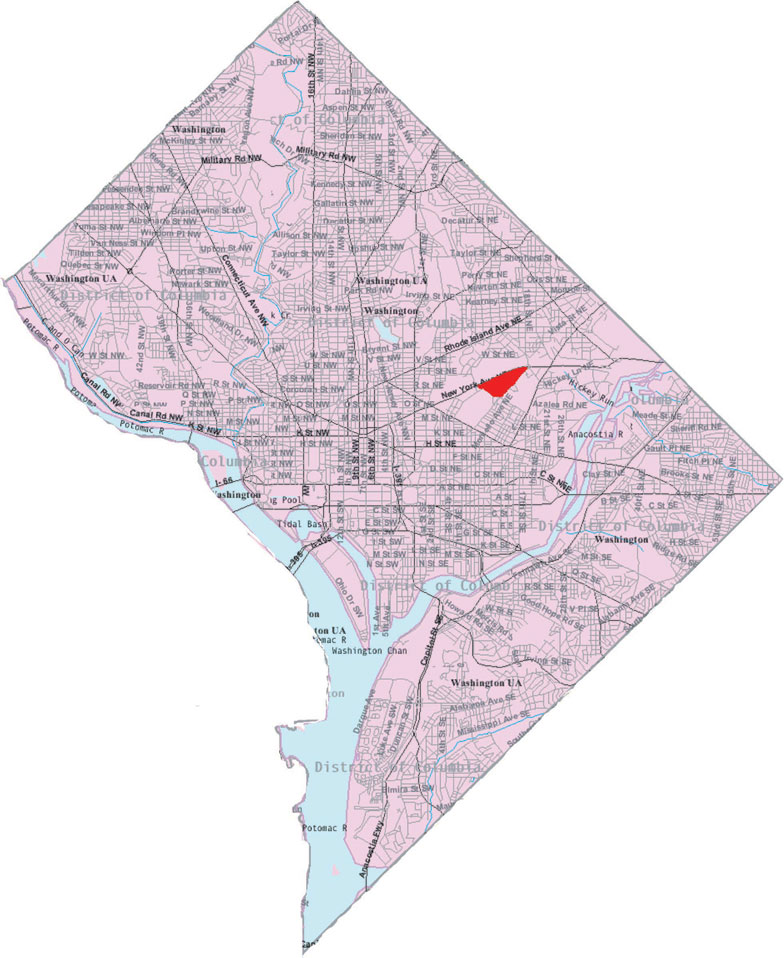
- Ivy City within the District of Columbia
- Coordinates: 38.9099°N 76.9917°W
- Country: United States
- Territory: Washington, D.C.
- Constructed: 1873

Ivy City is a small neighborhood in Northeast Washington, D.C., in the United States. About half the neighborhood is industrial or formerly industrial, dominated by warehouses. The Ivy City Yard, a railroad coach yard and maintenance facility for the passenger railroad Amtrak, is situated northwest across New York Avenue NE.

Ivy City was laid out as a suburban development for African Americans in 1873. Development was slow. From 1879 to 1901, the neighborhood hosted the Ivy City Racetrack, a horse racing facility. Construction on the rail yard began in 1907 and was complete within a year; many of its facilities were demolished in 1953 and 1954 as railroads switched from coal-fired locomotives to diesel-fueled or electric engines. The Alexander Crummell School, a community focal point, opened in 1911. After some years of enrollment decline, it closed in 1972 but has not been demolished.

In the 21st century, the area has undergone some gentrification, although people living in the residential core of Ivy City remain very poor and unemployment is high.

== Geography ==
Ivy City is on a triangular strip of land in the central part of the Northeast quadrant, bounded by New York Avenue to the northwest, West Virginia Avenue to the east, and Mt. Olivet Road to the south. The neighborhood is surrounded by Gallaudet University (across Mt. Olivet Rd.), Mount Olivet Cemetery (across West Virginia Ave.), and Amtrak's Ivy City yard (across New York Avenue).

Ivy City is located in Ward 5. The neighborhood is outside the boundaries of the L'Enfant Plan for the city of Washington within the District of Columbia.

== Founding ==
In 1831, the Baltimore and Ohio Railroad (B&O) received approval for a plan to build its Washington Branch, and passenger train service between Baltimore and Washington began in 1835. The track was built from the District border with Maryland to Boundary Avenue (now Florida Avenue) (Note: Originally, federal officials did not foresee that the city of Washington would expand to fill the boundaries of the entire District of Columbia. The "Federal City", or City of Washington, originally lay within an area bounded by Boundary Street (northwest and northeast), 15th Street Northeast, East Capitol Street, the Anacostia River, the Potomac River, and Rock Creek.) along the route of the then-unbuilt West Virginia Avenue.

Much of the land surrounding the future Ivy City was owned by the Fenwick family. These were descendants of Thomas Notley, the 8th Proprietary governor of the Province of Maryland from 1676 through 1679. Mary Fenwick's father was Notley Young, one of the largest landowners in southern Maryland and who, along with David Burnes, Daniel Carroll, Samuel Davidson, and Robert Peter were later known as the "original patentees" (original landowners) of the District of Columbia. The land that became the District of Columbia was originally given to George Calvert, 1st Baron Baltimore, by King Charles I in 1632 (ignoring claims to the land held by Native Americans). Beginning in 1664, Calvert's heir, Leonard Calvert, began subdividing this claim and issuing title to various sized parcels to buyers. On September 24, 1685, Andrew Clarke purchased from Calvert 500 acres (2,000,000 m^{2}) of land fronting on the Anacostia River. The southern boundary of this "patent" (as title to land was called) began about where East Capitol Street meets the river, and ran north-northwest to about Trinidad Avenue NE. Clarke called this patent Meurs. In 1734, Thomas Evans purchased 414 acres (1,680,000 m^{2}) of Meurs from Clarke, and renamed the patent Chance. Notley Young purchased 217 acres (880,000 m^{2}) of Chance in 1771, and then purchased 158.5 acres (641,000 m^{2}) of a 1717 patent known as The Gleaning in 1786. Young combined Chance, The Gleaning, and several other smaller purchases (parts of Allison's Forest Enlarged, Allison's Forest Enlarged Resurveyed, and The Inclosure) into a single new tract—which he called Youngsborough—in 1793. Over time, others purchased small portions of Youngsborough from the Notleys and Fenwicks.

On February 21, 1871, the District of Columbia Organic Act of 1871 expanded the City of Washington so it encompassed the entire District of Columbia. This brought the Youngsborough tract under the jurisdiction of the city. (Note: The national capital was organized into a legal entity on February 27, 1801, with enactment of the District of Columbia Organic Act of 1801. The act recognized three incorporated cities: Alexandria, Georgetown, and the Federal City (or "City of Washington"). Unincorporated territory consisted of two counties: the County of Washington on the northeast bank of the Potomac, and the County of Alexandria on the southwest bank.)

On April 3, 1871, landowners George Oyster and Edward Fenwick sold their property to Frederick W. Jones, a director of the Georgetown Savings Bank and a local real estate developer. (Note: Adjacent landowners included a Mr. Derrington, Benjamin I. Fenwick, and a Mr. Mangum.) (Note: Jones died in 1891 at the age of 57.) Jones had the land platted, and the Ivy City Subdivision was recognized by the city on May 12, 1873.

== History ==
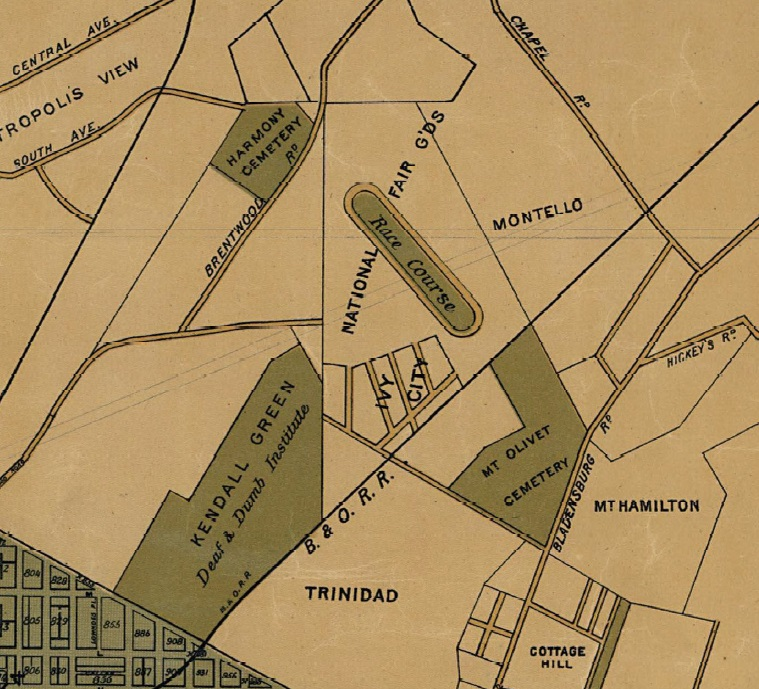
Map showing the growing Ivy City in 1887

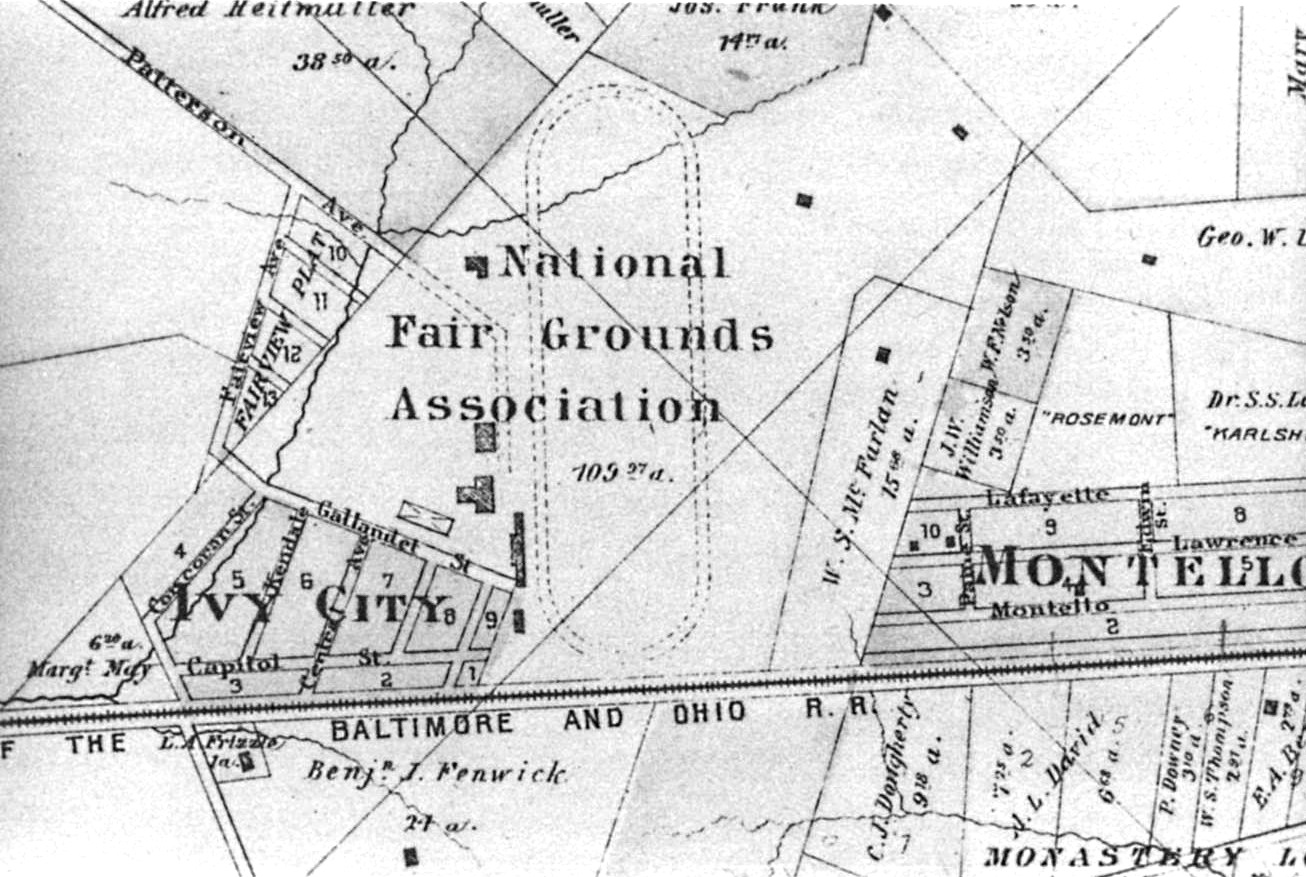
Ivy City in 1887, showing Patterson Avenue and Gallaudet Street

Jones laid out 205 lots in Ivy City. He envisioned the subdivision as a bucolic, rural community catering exclusively to African Americans. (Note: Racial segregation in housing was legal and routinely enforced in the District of Columbia until 1948.) Many streets in the area were named for adjacent landlords (Corcoran, Kendall, Fenwick, Gallaudet). Lots were priced at $100 each ($2,700 in 2025 dollars), and the earliest publicly acknowledged land sale occurred in December 1873 when F.P. Blair purchased Lot 9 for $150. A major auction of lots occurred in May 1875, but while many lots sold there was little building. Nearly all the residents were African-American, and structures consisted primarily of wooden shacks with no heat, electricity, natural gas, or sewer. The city provided drinking water from public pipes. Lots, however, were quite large compared to many of those in the Federal City.

=== The Ivy City horse-racing track ===
In 1878, the National Fair Grounds Association was incorporated with the purpose of hosting a "national fair" and building a horse racing track in the District of Columbia. On August 30, 1879, the NFGA bought parcels of land next to Ivy City from Charles Stewart and Mrs. Louis Fethervitch. Two days later, President Rutherford B. Hayes broke ground for a horse racing track on the site. About September 14, NFGA purchased Lots 1, 2, and 3 in Square 1 and Lots 1 through 10 in Square 9 in Ivy City from the Freedman's Savings and Trust Company. This allowed the track to extend southwest into Ivy City proper. On September 15, NFGA cut Gallaudet Street and Patterson Avenue (the latter no longer exists) to provide access to the track. The firm also sought permission from Gallaudet University to cut Mount Olivet Road NE from Brentwood Road to the tracks of the B&O Railroad, which built a siding, a 1,747-foot (532 m) platform, and a small telegraph office on the property.

The facility opened with a National Fair on October 28, 1879. Hayes declared a city holiday so workers could attend, and he spoke at the opening to a crowd estimated to be between 10,000 and 15,000. Buildings on the ground housed hundreds of exhibits featuring local products, services, and foods, and artworks. Sporting events were held every day. The fair closed on November 8.

In the spring of 1880, the NFGA operated the horse racing track. The B&O removed its passenger platform in 1886, reducing public access until a 700-foot (210 m) platform was built the following year. Heavy debts and competition from racetracks in Maryland forced the company into bankruptcy. It sold the property at public auction to James Lansburgh, one of its directors, in July 1890 for $133,500 ($4,780,000 in 2025 dollars). On January 7, 1891, Lansburgh sold 109.53 acres (443,300 m^{2}) of the parcel to Howard P. Marshall for $180,000 ($6,450,000 in 2025 dollars), who sold it for the same sum on September 10 to the Ivy City Brick Company. (Note: Ivy City Brick Co. went out of business in 1900.)

On March 2, 1891, Congress enacted legislation prohibiting lotteries and bookmaking within 1 mile (1.6 km) of the original limits of the Federal City.

Ivy City Brick did not immediately tear down the track and grandstand. In February 1893, a syndicate of New York City investors, led by Representative Timothy J. Campbell, (D–New York), attempted to revive racing at Ivy City. The clubhouse was destroyed by fire on February 23, and the B&O refused to run special trains to accommodate racegoers, hindering attendance. After just three weeks, the racing effort collapsed on March 17. Racing at Ivy City resumed on May 14, 1893, under the auspices of the Chevy Chase Hunt Club. New Jersey racetrack owners George Engeman and Albert Gleason leased the Ivy City track in August 1893 with the aim of having a 25-day "winter season" of racing in November. Engeman was initially opposed by the Washington Jockey Club, which was in the process of opening a racetrack in the Benning neighborhood east of the Anacostia River. Racing began on November 22 at both tracks,

Both city and federal officials declared the resumption of horse racing at Ivy City in violation of the 1891 law. At issue was whether the Ivy City track was within the one-mile limit. The city argued that distance to the track should be measured in a straight line, while track officials said it should be measured by the shortest route possible (which put it just outside the prohibited area). The Ivy City track obtained a one-month racing license while the issue was decided, but betting was prohibited during this period. Eager to provide betting, track officials set up a tent outside the one-mile limit, and accepted bets there. This was not a success, and bookmaking resumed at Ivy City. Federal officials threatened a police raid, and Engeman halted racing until a court could rule on the issue. U.S. District Attorney Arthur A. Birney refused to allow a "test case", and demanded that racing end. Racing and betting resumed on December 26. But police arrested bookmakers after the first race, and no further betting occurred. The December 26 races were the last for the season.

Although jockeys continued to race for their own enjoyment over the next several weeks, a grand jury indicted Engeman and several bookmakers on December 29, 1893. Trial began before Judge Cole of the D.C. Criminal Court on January 4, and on January 16 the court convicted all the defendants. The sentences were appealed, but the appellate court declined to overturn them in 1895.

The Ivy City stables and track continued to be used for stabling, training, and training races for horses running at the Benning racecourse for the next several years. In 1899, Lansburgh sold the rest of his land to developers. The Ivy City track continued to be used for stables and racing at least into the spring 1901 season. Their last known use was for the winter 1901 racing season, when they were ready for use but not needed due to the few number of horses running at Benning.

=== Rail yard ===
By 1903, only a single small brick building and the path of the racetrack still existed. It is not known when the grandstands or track were actually demolished. However, by 1903 the city was already planning to extend S, U, V, and 15th Streets NE and New York Avenue NE through the former racetrack site.

Federal legislation granting the B&O access to its right of way was not due to expire until 1910. But with development rapidly expanding in the area and the need for streets pressing, Congress enacted legislation on December 3, 1900, requiring the railroad to give up the right of way by 1905. The act allowed the B&O to purchase land in the Eckington neighborhood for a large rail yard, and for construction of a new passenger terminal in downtown Washington. The 1900 act drew strenuous objection from citizens of Eckington. The railroad subsequently won passage of an amendment on February 12, 1901, extending the time for relocation of its track to February 1906, and allowing it to move its rail yard to Ivy City.

On February 28, 1903, Congress passed legislation authorizing various railroads in the city to unite to build a new "union" passenger terminal to replace the four existing terminals scattered about downtown. This legislation led to the construction of Union Station, completed in 1908. This gave added importance to the new Ivy City rail yard, because the tracks to the new station would begin at Ivy City. By this time, the former racetrack site at Ivy City had significantly declined. The track had subsided, and rains filled the old track—turning it into a deep pond. In June 1903, a local African American boy drowned in the pond. Initially, city officials declined to order landowner Daniel McCarthy to fill in the pond, as McCarthy argued that construction on the rail yard would fill in the pond. But when another boy drowned there in July 1906, McCarthy was ordered to immediately fill in the depression. There were also numerous housing lots in Ivy City on which no construction had occurred. As excavation began on Union Station, these unoccupied lots were taken over by the B&O and used for a tent city to house workers. More than 110 men lived at the tent city, where living conditions were very poor. Most of the workers were Italian, and one worker died from pneumonia in October 1903. This led to an extensive investigation into living conditions in the tent city. Although sanitation, sewage, and trash were severe problems, the men generally were found to be well-fed and the tents warm enough to withstand winter conditions.

With the arrival of the rail yard, some living conditions in Ivy City improved as infrastructure was upgraded to accommodate the railroad. In December 1905, the city approved construction of the first sewer main to serve the neighborhood. Construction on the rail yard began in 1907. The B&O began dismantling its rail yard at New Jersey Avenue NW and D Street NW, and began moving the equipment to Ivy City. The new rail yard, located about 1 mile (1.6 km) outside the Federal City limits, included two 100-foot (30 m) long roundhouses, each surrounded by 25 short tracks leading to train sheds where engines could be stores or worked on. Each shed had a pit below the track, allowing the engine to be worked on from below. The rail yard also contained a "coal wharf", a coal storage facility which could load an engine's tender in under 30 seconds, and two gigantic water spouts which could fill an engine's water tank from above in less than a minute. The tracks throughout the rail yard were lined with numerous inspection pits (where workers in a pit low the tracks could inspect the lower and underside portions of an engine quickly) and ash pits (pits where engines could quickly dump their coal ash for later retrieval and disposal). The Ivy City rail yard also contained a coal-powered steam generating plant. This plant provided steam heat for railroad buildings at Ivy City as well as the B&O's Eckington rail yard more than 0.5-mile (0.80 km) away. Steam was also used to prime locomotive engines and preheat passenger cars before use. The plant generated a large amount of smoke and ash, which polluted the Ivy City neighborhood.

Unbuilt land in Ivy City became the site of another tent city in the summer of 1908. This time, machinists overhauling locomotives for the B&O went on strike for higher wages (they demanded 32 cents an hour) on July 10. The railroad immediately locked them out and hired strikebreakers and permanent replacements. The striking workers set up a large meeting tent at Ivy City, and surrounded it with smaller sleeping tents for the men. Dubbing their tent city "Camp Wine View", the men armed themselves with clubs and began picketing the new B&O rail yard at Ivy City. There was no violence, and the strike largely ended by July 17 as workers went back to work without a contract.

A portion of the Ivy City rail yard was electrified in 1934, reducing the amount of smoke coming from coal-fired locomotive engines. Even so, by the mid-1940s, the Ivy City rail yard was handling 200 coal-fed locomotives a day.

In 1947, Ivy City residents made a concerted effort to complain to the city about the amount of soot, smoke, and noise coming from the rail yard. After an investigation, the city fined the B&O in February 1948 for violating anti-smoke laws.

=== Alexander Crummell School ===
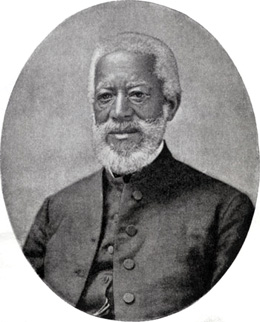
Alexander Crummell

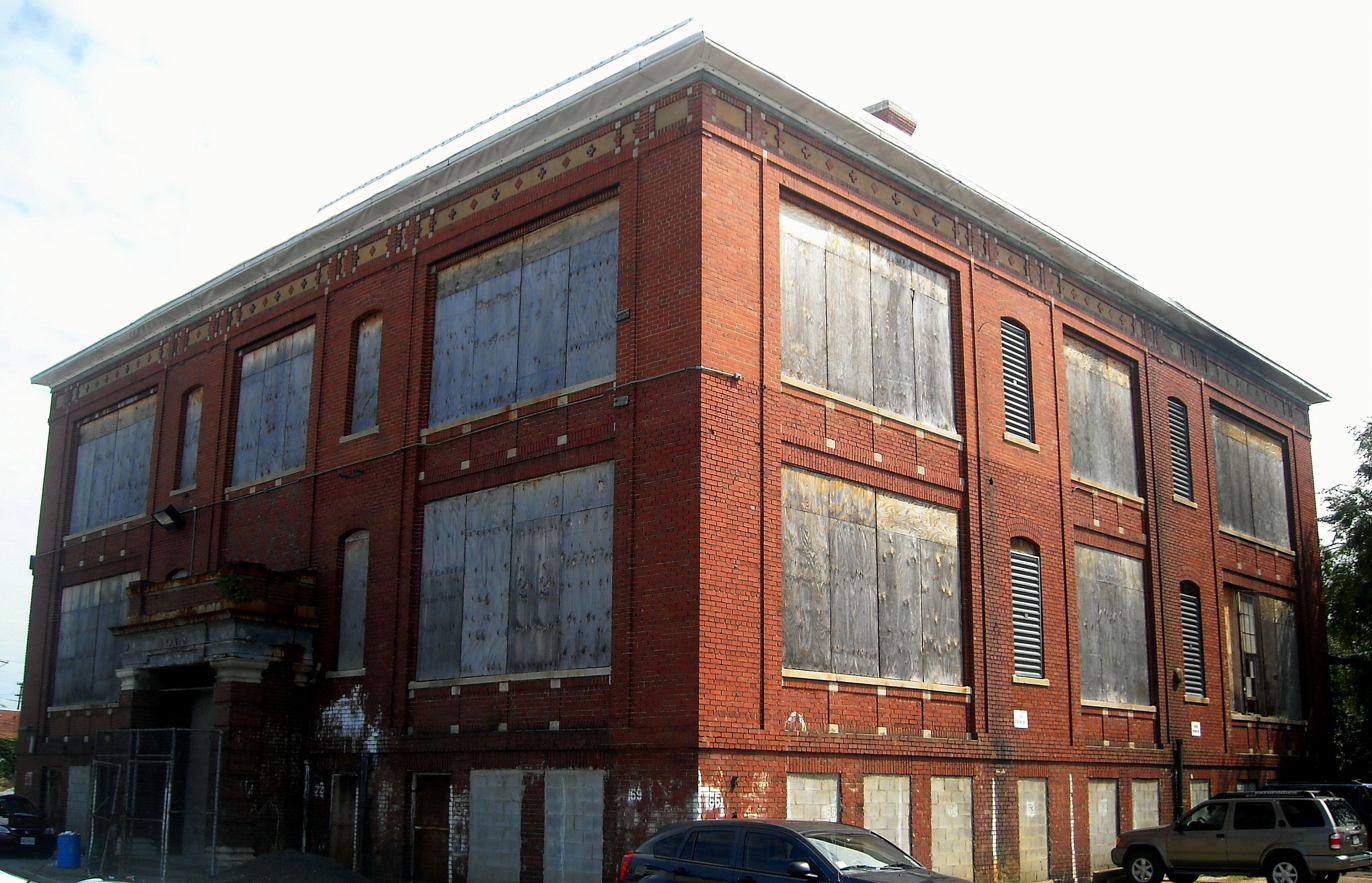
The Alexander Crummell School in 2008

Ivy City residents began asking that the city build an elementary school in their neighborhood in 1893. As most of the residents were African American, and racial segregation in public education was required by law at the time, the school would have served African American children only. The need for a school was urgent, as the nearest school for black children was located in the Benning neighborhood, nearly 4 miles (6.4 km) distant. Just over a year later, the District of Columbia Public Schools board of trustees approved plans to spend $4,500 ($161,200 in 2025 dollars) to purchase land at 1900 Gallaudet Street NE and build a two-room schoolhouse. At that time, Congress had complete control over the city's budget, and it cut the estimated cost of the school to $4,000 ($154,800 in 2025 dollars) in June 1895. The land for the school was purchased from George McKinlay in August 1895, and the George W. Barkman & Son construction company began construction on the building (whose cost was budgeted at $2,390 ($92,500 in 2025 dollars)) in September. The Ivy City School was completed in early February 1896.

As Ivy City continued to grow, there were repeated calls to enlarge the school and make improvements to it. A two-room addition was proposed by local residents in 1902, and constructed in 1903. The Ivy City School was the launching point for the career of African American educator Alfred Kiger Savoy, who was first appointed a teacher at the school in 1903. Kiger eventually became assistant superintendent of the D.C. public school system, and oversaw all African American elementary schools in the city. He retired in 1953. At his death in 1964 at the age of 80, he was lauded as one of the most capable and effective leaders the D.C. Public Schools had ever had.

The 1903 addition did little to alleviate overcrowding, however, and in 1906 the city leased a room in a home 100 yards (91 m) away as a classroom. DCPS proposed purchasing an addition 25,000 square feet (2,300 m^{2}) of land and erecting a new four-room elementary school at a cost of $35,000 ($1,254,000 in 2025 dollars) in 1908, but Congress refused to approve the expenditure. A year later, DCPS again proposed construction of a four-room elementary school, although by this time the school's size had expanded to six rooms and the amount of the required land to 32,000 square feet (3,000 m^{2}).

This time, Congress approved the new school. The DCPS board of trustees agreed in November 1910 to name the school the Alexander Crummell School, after the prominent Episcopal priest who was a prominent advocate of Pan-Africanism and who founded St. Luke's Episcopal Church—the first independent black Episcopal church in the city. It was the first school in the city to be named for an African American. Plans for the new school were ready by February 1, 1911, and ground was broken on March 20. (Note: On May 24, 1911, a bricklayer plunged 25 feet (7.6 m) headfirst from the half-finished second story wall to the basement in front of dozens of horrified onlookers. Amazingly, he did not die. He received a severe cut on the head and was dazed for a few moments but suffered no other injuries.) The school was designed by Snowden Ashford, the Municipal Architect for the city, and the total cost of land and construction was $44,000. The two-story structure was in the Renaissance Revival style, and was constructed of stone with stucco-covered walls. Large windows admitted extensive amounts of natural light, and extensive tiling decorated the interior. The school opened on October 22, 1911, even though it was not finished.

Expansion of the Alexander Crummell School was proposed several times over the next six decades, to no avail. A six-room, $100,000 addition was approved the DCPS in 1924, but cut by Congress every time it was proposed from 1924 to 1927. By 1930, the school was no longer in good condition. The building was constructed on a low spot on the site, which meant that water (sometimes 3 feet (0.91 m) deep) ponded on the property when it rained. The old coal heating system failed to keep the school warm in winter, and covered the walls in soot. The playground was far too small to accommodate the school's growing enrollment, and there was no gymnasium or assembly hall. A $36,000 two-room addition was proposed in 1931, a $25,000 two-room addition in 1932, and a $10,800 doubling of the school's size in 1933. No action was taken on these proposals. The Great Depression and World War II limited funding for school construction. Ivy City continued to grow in the 1930s and 1940s, and in 1949 local residents asked the city to build an eight-room addition and pool for the school as well as expand the playground. A similar request was made in 1950, with residents also demanding an assembly hall and gymnasium. An addition was proposed in 1954 and a 12-room addition, auditorium, and modernization of the heating and lighting requested in 1957. These requests were also turned down.

By 1971, the Alexander Crummell School had 397 students, but enrollment was declining rapidly as residents fled the decaying neighborhood. The school closed in 1972. The Washington Urban League leased the school in 1973 for use as a day care center, private school, and recreation center, but extensive vandalism and several burglaries caused the organization to close these programs down. By October 1976, the Alexander Crummell School was completely vacant, and DCPS voted to close the building and seek no tenants for it in January 1977.

Over the next few years, the school parking lot and land were used for a number of uses, including a parking lot for city vehicles. From 1997 to 2003, trailers for a homeless men's shelter sat on the site. In 1999, the Accucrete construction company offered to buy the property, but the city could not work out a deal and the offer was withdrawn in 2001. The Crummell School was added to the National Register of Historic Places in 2003. The Washington Animal Rescue League offered to lease the school for use as an animal shelter in early 2004, but this proposal was not accepted. Community residents long pressed the city to turn the school into a community center, but city officials said the structure needed at least $7 million in renovations (but was only worth $1.65 million).

Ivy City elementary students were assigned to Ruth K. Webb Elementary School at 1375 Mt. Olivet Road NE, which was erected in 1958.

=== Streets ===
Access to lots at Ivy City was initially limited to dirt tracks. The cutting of streets was limited until developers felt enough lots had been sold to warrant better access. For example, as late as 1895, the area's roads were ungraded ruts lacking sidewalks and street lights, there was no storm water drainage, and fresh drinking water was provided by wells (not the city water system).

Although lots at Ivy City began to be sold in 1873, it was not until September 1879 that the first street, Gallaudet Street, was cut. Central Avenue followed about 1888, Corcoran Street about 1890, a portion of Kendall Street about 1891, (Note: The northern terminus of Kendall Street then was Gallaudet Street.) Okie Street about 1892, (Note: The western terminus of Okie Street then is the same as it is now.) Olivet Street (later Mt. Olivet Road) about 1892, Providence Street about 1895, and Fenwick Street about 1898. At some point, S Street NE was cut through the area from the west, and 15th Street NE cut in a U shape on the southeast side of West Virginia Avenue NE beginning at Fenwick Street.

In January 1907, after the B&O Railroad removed its tracks from the right of way, the District government announced plans to cut and pave West Virginia Avenue NE from Florida Avenue to 16th Street NE (near the northeastern tip of Ivy City). (Note: West Virginia Avenue already existed within the Federal City, extending from Florida Avenue NE southwest to K Street NE (between 7th and 8th Streets NE). It should have extended through Square 857 to the southwest corner of Square 857, to the intersection of I and 6th Streets NW, but the city appropriated Square 857 for use as a property yard and dumping ground and the street was never extended. West Virginia Avenue inside the Federal City was but a graded dirt road at least until 1910.) Grading of part of the street occurred by 1911, but it is unclear just when the street was graded or paved.

Other street changes occurred as well. After a study, the city eliminated S Street SE in Ivy City and closed but did not eliminate 15th Street SE. The city allowed a new street (probably the eastern half of Okie Street NW) to be cut parallel to New York Avenue NE to straighten the street lines within the development. Another change added the northernmost block of Kendall Street NE, which was cut and paved in 1933, allowing the street to connect with New York Avenue NE. In April 1941, city engineers proposed a master plan for improving roads and interchanges in the city. The master plan proposed widening West Virginia Avenue NE (two lanes to three) between Mt. Olivet Road and Montana Avenue NE; widening Mt. Olivet Rd. (two lanes to four) from Bladensburg Road to New York Avenue NE; realigning Brentwood Road into an S-curve so it meets Mt. Olivet Road at New York Avenue NE, with a major new intersection and grade separation from the railroad tracks there; and a major new interchange where West Virginia Avenue, Montana Avenue, and New York Avenue NE meet. The Brentwood Road realignment (essentially, the creation of 9th Street NE and Brentwood Parkway NE, to connect Brentwood Road NE with 6th Street NE Extended) was complete in September 1942 with the opening of the 9th Street NE Bridge.

=== Receiving Home for Children ===
Ivy City became the location of the District of Columbia Receiving Home for Children in 1949. The city began operating a facility for the temporary housing of mentally ill, violent, abandoned, addicted, or criminal children in 1928. The Receiving Home was charged with taking temporary care of individuals under the age of 18 who had become wards of the state. Long-term housing and care, defined as anything longer than a few weeks, was provided by the agency to which the child was assigned (such as St. Elizabeths Psychiatric Hospital, the city youth detention center, or a foster home). Originally located on the 800 block of Potomac Avenue SE, the Receiving Home moved several times over the next two decades. The agency generally leased former homes, office buildings, or warehouses for use, renovating them as needed, but the city recognized that such efforts were only temporary and that a custom-built structure, with good security as well as treatment facilities, was needed for children assigned temporarily to the Receiving Home.

After extensive debate among city officials and members of Congress, the D.C. Receiving Home for Children was opened in January 1949 at 1000 Mt. Olivet Road NE. Although $335,000 ($4,489,000 in 2025 dollars) was spent constructing the facility, the cost of the Receiving Home proved much greater than the amount budgeted and the facility was only partially completed. As built, the two-story, three-wing structure contained a kitchen, several serving pantries, laundry room, recreation room, and medical treatment room. A maximum of 46 individuals could be accommodated. The medical room was only able to render first aid, and no medical staff were assigned to the Receiving Home. Security was minimal, and escapes were frequent.

In 1954, Congress appropriated $550,000 ($6,594,000 in 2025 dollars) to finish the Receiving Home for Children. But the city refused to spend the money, arguing that the structure had so deteriorated since 1949 that it should be condemned and a far greater sum of money spent on building a much larger facility elsewhere. This meant the Receiving Home for Children continued to be used, and continued to provide substandard housing and care for its wards. By 1955, an average of 100 to 110 children were staying in the Receiving Home each night.

The facility continued to exist into the 2010s. Now known as the Youth Services Center, the facility had expanded to 88 beds, although it still often housed more children than intended.

== Development ==
=== Industrialization and decline of the railroad ===
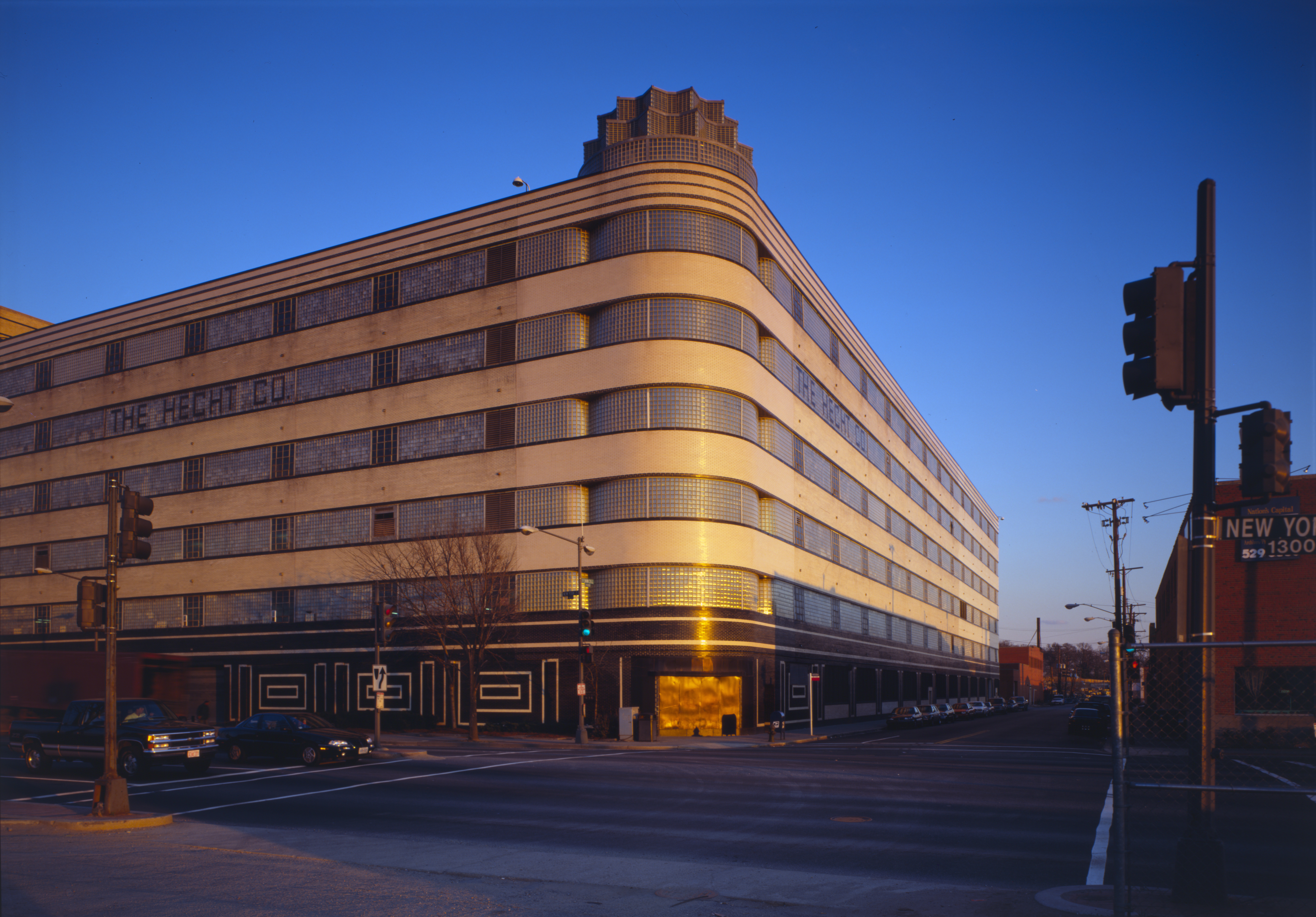
The Hecht's Warehouse in the 1990s

After the establishment of the B&O rail yard, Ivy City attracted a large number of rail yard workers as residents. This allowed the neighborhood to thrive. Nonetheless, Ivy City received few services from the city. In the 1920s, there was a single fire alarm callbox in the entire neighborhood, and the city had installed only a second main sewer line. But residents were dismayed when the city built a trash incinerator in 1928 at the junction of Mt. Olivet Road and West Virginia Avenue NE. As of 1931, only a single road (West Virginia Avenue NE) gave access to Ivy City.

Industrial development in Ivy City began in the 1930s. The District of Columbia was only the second municipality in the United States (after New York City) to adopt a zoning code. With the Zoning Act of March 1, 1920, Congress authorized the District government to establish zoning and created a District of Columbia Zoning Commission to oversee zoning rules, regulation, implementation, and enforcement. The New York Avenue Corridor and Ivy City were zoned for combined use, which meant residential, retail, and industrial uses were all permitted. Once New York Avenue NE was paved in 1931, numerous filling stations quickly lined the street. Over the next three years, a number of industrial concerns opened in the neighborhood: a Washington Milk Bottle Exchange cleaning facility and glass factory on Fenwick Street south of New York Avenue; the offices of Mitchell & Unsinn, a construction firm, at 2006 Fenwick Street; the offices of R.E.A. Cleaning, an industrial cleaning firm, at 1925 New York Avenue; and the Nehi bottling plant at 1923 New York Avenue. In mid-1934, the F.P. May Co., a hardware retailer, opened a large warehouse at New York Avenue and West Virginia Avenue. By the end of the year, Greyhound Bus Lines had constructed a bus station at 1900 New York Avenue NE, occupying 400 feet (120 m) of the street. The Youngsborough Syndicate, a group of real estate investors, also purchased a large number of parcels along New York Avenue, Fairview Avenue, Gallaudet Street, and Fenwick Street with the intention of creating an industrial park. The Miller Casket Co., a coffin manufacturer, also opened a factory on New York Avenue between Kendall Street and Fenwick Avenue. In 1937, the Hecht Company constructed a warehouse at 1401 New York Avenue NE. Described by The Washington Post as the pinnacle of industrial design, the 400,000-square-foot (37,000 m^{2}) structure was built in the Streamline Moderne architectural style. The six-story building made extensive use of glass brick along its exterior walls, culminating in a seventh-story glass brick tower which was brilliantly lit at night.

During World War II, Ivy City became a backwater. Little attention was paid to the neighborhood, and the war effort meant that the railroad's needs took precedence over that of the average resident. Industrial buildings, warehouses, vehicle storage lots, and junkyards proliferated in Ivy City. As World War II came to a close, Ivy City's infrastructure was also beginning to deteriorate. Residents complained about poorly-paved streets, a lack of sidewalks, no street lighting, crumbling and trash-filled alleys and a complete lack of stormwater drainage. (Until the 2000s, Ivy City continued to be particularly hard-hit by stormwater flooding. The intersection of West Virginia Avenue NE and Mt. Olivet Road NE was inundated every time there was significant rainfall.)

In 1949, the railroad announced a $1.2 million ($16 million in 2025 dollars) project to add a new roundhouse for diesel locomotives at Ivy City and improve repair shops. The project also provided for transfer of the coal-fired steam generating plant to Eckington, alleviating much of the smoke and ash problem at Ivy City.

Ivy City began a significant decline in 1953. American railroads, which until this time had used coal-fueled locomotives, began switching to diesel fuel or using overhead electrical wires for powering engines. By the end of the year, almost no coal-fed locomotives were using the Ivy City rail yard. Although coal-fueled engines required frequent refueling, a diesel train could go for as many as three days without needing more diesel fuel. Steam-powered locomotives required almost daily tune-up and repair, but diesel-fueled engines rarely did. Significant layoffs at the Ivy City Yard occurred, deeply affecting Ivy City itself where many of these workers lived. The eastern roundhouse and a number of tracks were demolished in early 1954, and by 1956 the coal wharf and ash pits were also gone. As the railroad laid off workers, Ivy City also declined as a neighborhood.

=== The proposed Inner Loop ===
As unemployed residents began leaving Ivy City and housing stock declined due to disrepair, city planners considered the neighborhood expendable. In 1959, the government of the District of Columbia proposed building an interstate highway through the center of the neighborhood. This was the Inner Loop—three concentric highways centered on the National Mall. The first was planned to run in a rough oval about 1 mile (1.6 km) from the Mall. The second was projected to run from the Lincoln Memorial, along Independence Avenue SW and Maine Avenue SW to the Washington Channel, where it would follow the riverbank to East Capitol Street before cutting north and then northwest (in part following Mt. Olivet Road) through the Trinidad and Ivy City neighborhoods. It would follow the rail line north to Missouri Avenue NW, then cut west along Military Road NW before reaching Nebraska Avenue NW. Then it would turn south down Nebraska Avenue NW and New Mexico Avenue NW before terminating in Georgetown. The third highway would encircle the District of Columbia at various points some miles outside the city limits. (Note: This third encircling highway, now known as the Capital Beltway, was the only element constructed in its entirety. Portions of the "Middle Loop", as the second encircling freeway was informally called, were built, including the Whitehurst Freeway through Georgetown; a portion of Interstate 66 from the Whitehurst Freeway south through the Foggy Bottom neighborhood and West Potomac Park, and across the Theodore Roosevelt Bridge; Interstate 395 (the "Southwest Freeway") across the 14th Street Bridge, through East Potomac Park and cutting east and then north through downtown D.C.; and Interstate 695 (the "Southeast Freeway") from the junction with I-395 to Barney Circle.) Two additional highways were included in this plan. One was the "Center Leg", a new segment of Interstate 95 (now signed Interstate 395) to begin at about E and 2nd Streets SW and continue north through the city before joining with I-95 in Maryland. The other was the New York Avenue Industrial Freeway, four northbound and five southbound lanes of limited-access highway running along New York Avenue NE from the proposed junction with I-395 at Florida Avenue NE and running to the District-Maryland line. New bridges across the Potomac River (such as the proposed Three Sisters Bridge) would feed traffic into the system.

The Whitehurst Freeway portion of the Middle Loop was first proposed in 1941. The Middle Loop plan, including its passage northwest through the center of Ivy City, was first proposed in 1946 in a study of the D.C. highway system conducted by the J. E. Greiner Company for the city government. Subsequent studies by the Federal Highway Administration (FHA) (1959), Clarkson Engineering Co. (1961), National Capital Planning Commission (NCPC) (1961), National Capital Transportation Agency (NCTA) (1962), J. E. Greiner Co. (1964), NCPC (1965), and J. E. Greiner Co. (1966) appeared between 1959 and 1966. Similar studies, by the J. E. Greiner Co. (1946), by the FHA (1959), Clarkson Engineering Co. (1960), NCPC (1961), NCTA (1962), J. E. Greiner Co. (1964), NCPC (1965), and J. E. Greiner Co. (1966), appeared during the same time period, laying out and reiterating support for the New York Avenue Industrial Freeway. By 1966, however, opposition from local residents had not only led to serious restudy of the proposed route, but had brought construction of almost all highways and interstate freeways in the city to a halt.

The Inner Loop alone would have displaced 350 families and 26 businesses in Ivy City. But unlike residents in most neighborhoods, those interviewed by The Washington Post in 1967 were happy to see Ivy City destroyed by the highway. The housing was too dilapidated and the crime too severe, these residents said. Nevertheless, protests and pressure on Congress to end the program continued until the entire all unbuilt highways were cancelled in 1977.

=== Rapid decline, 1960s and 1970s ===
By the mid-1960s, Ivy City was one of only a few industrially zoned spaces left in the District of Columbia. Just a few years later, even light industry was leaving the area. The large ironworks at 1240 Mt. Olivet Road had closed, and was now a camera repair shop. Ivy City was in steep decline. In the past several years, only three new structures had been built in the neighborhood (one of them being Bethesda Baptist Church), and home ownership in the area was very low. Most residents rented their homes, which consisted of small apartment building, industrial structures converted to tenements and cramped rowhouses. The neighborhood was noisy at all times of the day and night, and fighting in the streets was common.

By the 1970s, Ivy City had declined so strongly that District officials targeted it for Model City reconstruction. The Model Cities Program was a federally funded effort which allowed local residents to redesign, revitalize, and reconstruct neighborhoods most severely affected by poverty. The D.C. government focused its Model City efforts on the neighborhoods of Ivy City, Trinidad, Shaw, and Stanton Park. The goal was to renovate distressed housing and turn it into federally subsidized low-income housing. Ivy City was chosen because the neighborhood had seen a severe decline of 20,000 residents since 1960, leaving just 80,000 people living there. This meant there was a good deal of unoccupied housing to renovate. Low-income housing was desperately needed there, as the birth rate in Ivy City was a shockingly-high 49.4 per 1,000, with most households led by a single mother. Residents in Ivy City were also extremely poor, with 22,000 of the neighborhood's residents earning less than $3,000 ($23,800 in 2025 dollars) a year. In 1971, the crime rate in Ivy City was among the highest in the District of Columbia.

On June 21, 1970, the Penn Central Railroad, which had inherited the B&O tracks and was one of the largest private companies in the United States, declared bankruptcy. With the railroad still in bankruptcy in 1972, the District government considered condemning the former B&O rail yard at Ivy City and using the land to construct an industrial park. But nothing came of this proposal.

Ivy City continued its steep decline through the 1970s. The neighborhood was increasingly poor: Median household income was just $5,333 ($34,800 in 2025 dollars), compared to $9,738 ($63,600 in 2025 dollars) elsewhere in Ward 5. While just 12 percent of individuals living in Ward 5 were poor, almost all of them lived in either Ivy City or adjacent Trinidad. Despair was a major issue for residents there. By 1979, almost no Ivy City residents turned out to vote in city elections.

=== Redevelopment proposals of the 1980s and 1990s ===
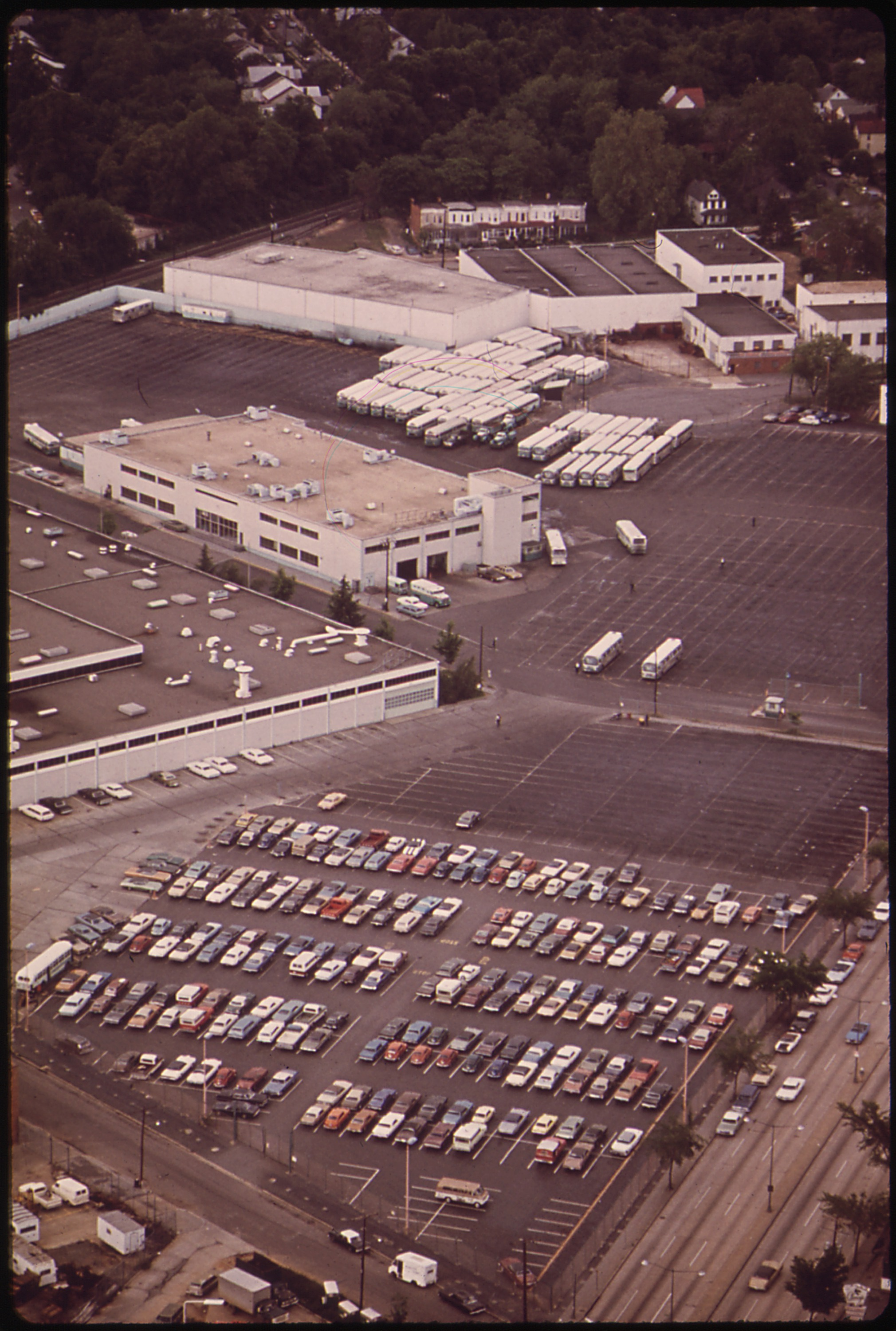
Bus parking lots off New York Avenue NE in Ivy City in the 1970s

By 1981, Ivy City had shed another 75,000 residents, leaving just 5,000 people living there. D.C. Mayor Marion Barry, attempting to alleviate the economic distress caused by the early 1980s recession, announced in early 1984 that he had targeted Ivy City for a major revitalization effort. The neighborhood was still overwhelmingly industrial, with the city having located its animal shelter and a vehicle inspection lot in the area. The area skyline was dominated by the chimney of the now-dormant trash incinerator. There was an extensive amount of abandoned property, and what housing remained was often overcrowded and in extreme disrepair. At 12 percent, the home ownership rate in Ivy City was the worst of any neighborhood in the District (where the rate of home ownership was about 33 percent). The Ivy City population was highly transient, and the rate of drug and alcohol addiction was high. Fifty percent of all households in Ivy City were led by a single mother, a large percentage of the Ivy City population were high school dropouts, and unemployment was extremely high. About 20 percent of Ivy City residents received public assistance, and infant mortality was 38.3 per thousand, double that of the rest of the District of Columbia. Ivy City was also a food desert, with the nearest supermarket more than 2 miles (3.2 km) away (an hour's bus ride) and only a single convenience store. Ivy City also became notorious for its open air drug markets. The District of Columbia National Guard even used arc lamps to illuminate streets and alleys in Ivy City at night in order to discourage drug dealers.

The Barry administration's revitalization plan for the 16-block community focused on public housing. Since about 1980, the District of Columbia Housing Authority (DCHA) had constructed 64 apartment units on Mt. Olivet Road. Now DCHA began construction on the Western Mews, a publicly owned housing rowhouse project on Capital Avenue. It was also ready to begin construction on 24 townhouses, each with two to four bedrooms, on Capital Avenue as well. But the construction of public housing did not alleviate the problems in Ivy City. The population had crashed to just 2,000 residents over 12 blocks. Ivy City was one of just three neighborhoods in the District with combined zoning, which hampered its residential and retail nature, and most people who lived there worked for either the railroad or for trash hauling firms. In August 1986, D.C. City Council member William Spaulding (who represented Ward 5) was booed off the stage at an Ivy City block party by residents angry at the lack of progress in Ivy City. (Mayor Barry, forewarned of the neighborhood's mood, declined to appear.) Leaders of Mandala Inc., a nonprofit long active in the community, denounced Barry and Spaulding and decried the terrible housing conditions still extant in the neighborhood. At least 40 percent of property in Ivy City, they said, was either vacant or should be condemned. Mayor Barry reacted to the incident by announcing a few weeks later the formation of a task force to oversee Ivy City's revitalization.

In 1986, families of those placed at the Receiving Home for Children sued over the poor conditions there. A federal court found that the facility had violated the constitutional rights of the children there by housing an average of 71 individuals a night at the Receiving Home. Staffing ratios were 1 staff person for 10 children, and on particularly bad days could worsen to 1 to 15. The court ordered the city to house no more than 38 children, ordered a fine of $1,000 a day for every day the facility held more than 38 children.

By the early 1990s, Ivy City was suffering from a proliferation of liquor stores and illegal dumping. The neighborhood once more hosted an incinerator, this one operated by Browning-Ferris Industries. The plant, located at the corner of New York Avenue NE and Fenwick Street NE, accepted several truckloads of biomedical waste each day and burned it. Nor had conditions at the Receiving Home improved.

On May 18, 1994, Vincent Orange launched his first run for the Ward 5 city council seat in Ivy City. Orange, making his third run at the council (he'd previously campaigned for council chair in 1991 and 1993), sought to unseat incumbent Harry Thomas Sr., who had represented Ward 5 since 1987. Orange lost the race, but easily won a rematch in 1998.

In 1996, Mayor Barry proposed a second plan to revitalize Ivy City. This plan emerged from a 37-member task force set up to study the District's traffic and transportation problems. In particular, the panel studied New York Avenue NE, which carried 100,000 vehicles a day (the city's second-busiest street after Kenilworth Avenue NE). New York Avenue, the group argued, should be the preferred route for Marylanders accessing the Washington Convention Center and MCI Center downtown, and needed to be improved and traffic speeded up along the route so that tourists and business travelers would feel comfortable using the street and U.S. Route 50 to access Baltimore–Washington International Airport. Their $2 billion plan included construction of a light rail line along the street from the Mount Vernon Square Metro station to the Fort Lincoln neighborhood; construction of a tunnel beneath New York Avenue, with only limited access points, to carry commuter traffic between Florida Avenue and the Maryland line; a commuter rail station at Ivy City to separate commuter rail from other railroad traffic at congested Union Station; a "relief road" paralleling New York Avenue from South Dakota Avenue NE to North Capitol Street to get local commercial traffic off the avenue; and use of the air rights over the Ivy City Yard for the construction of a platform that would provide parking, office space, and an entertainment venue. The plan was an immediate non-starter, however, as the cost was prohibitive.

Ivy City's problems appeared to worsen in March, 1997 when American Environmental Solutions, a trash hauling firm, opened a trash collection and transfer station at 1000 Kendall Street NE. Residents of Ivy City were outraged, and their anger worsened when they discovered in May that the city did not require a permit for trash transfer facilities in combined-zoning neighborhoods. City officials, however, agreed to sue American Environmental Solutions on behalf of Ivy City residents. In August 1997, a D.C. Superior Court judge held that the city could order the trash transfer station closed under general nuisance and public health laws.

In 1998, just 12 years after its construction, the city tore down the Western Mews public housing complex. Western Mews had been poorly run, rarely maintained, and had become so dilapidated and infested with rodents and insects that it could not be salvaged and had to be demolished. West Virginia Avenue NE, still the only major route into Ivy City, was still in serious disrepair as well.

A serious environmental issue occurred in Ivy City in 1999. In March, the city accused Hartford Knox Street Associates, owner of six apartment buildings in Southeast D.C., of illegally dumping 110 bags filled with asbestos-laden insulation in an alley in Ivy City. District of Columbia Department of Public Health officials said the company had removed the insulation without proper safety procedures from its buildings, and then dumped them in an area where residents could come into contact with the cancer-causing asbestos.

=== Early 2000s controversies ===
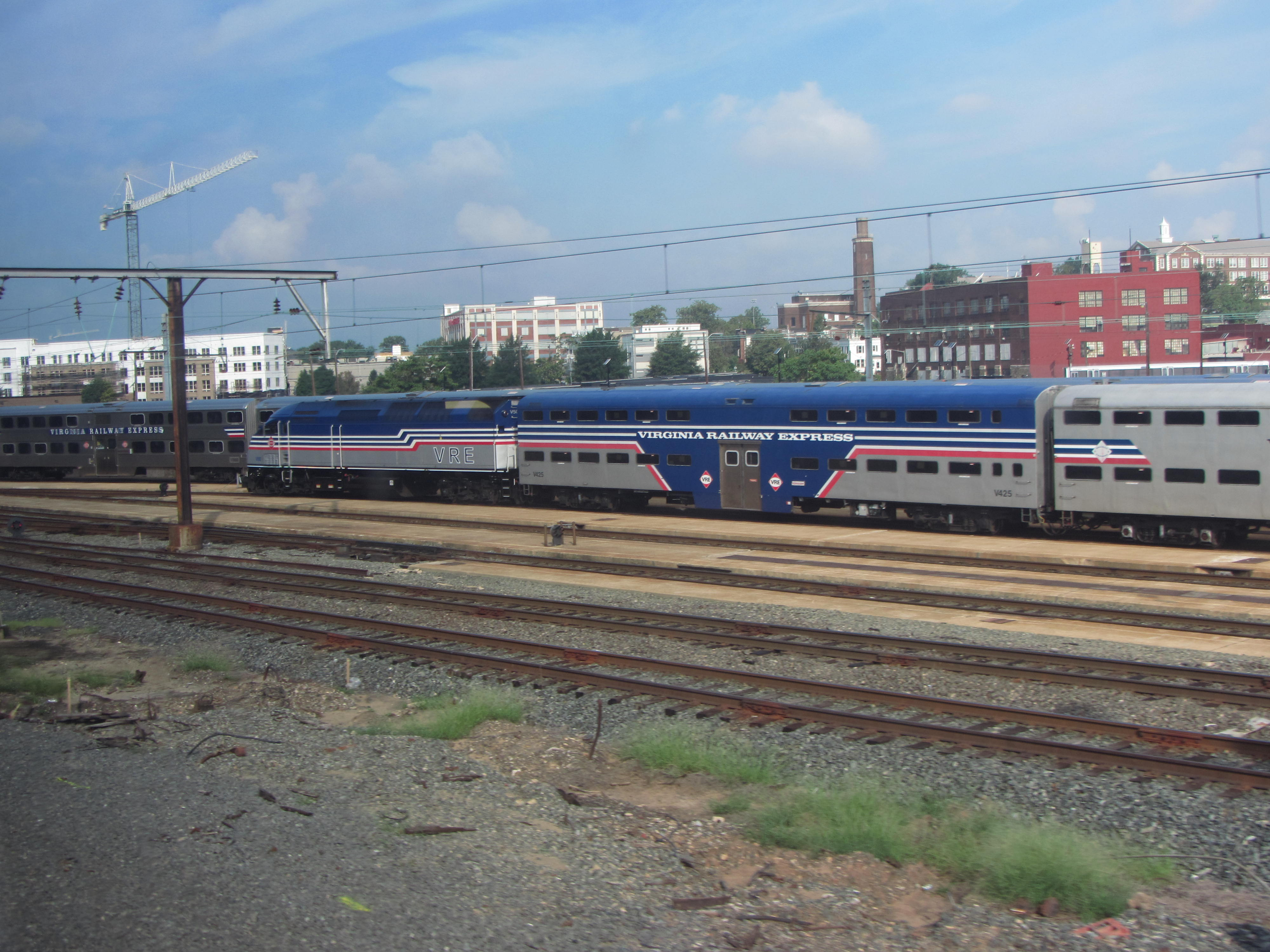
A VRE train parked in the Ivy City rail yard. VRE purchased this part of the rail yard in the early to mid 2000s.

Ivy City remained an industrial area into the 2000s. Fast food restaurants, commercial printers, automobile repair shops, and used auto parts stores were common in the neighborhood. Much of the 1300 block of New York Avenue NE was used as a parking lot for city school buses, and the former playground of the Crummell School was used as a District of Columbia Department of Public Works vehicle storage yard. The number of people living in the area during the 1990s had declined by one-third, leaving numerous abandoned and vacant properties.

In November 2001, club owner Marc Barnes opened a new, large, luxurious nightclub, Dream, at 1350 Okie Street NE. The four-story club had several extensive dance floors, semi-private space for patrons who paid for it, a number of bars, and catered to a wide range of races and age groups as well as people with musical tastes ranging from 1980s New Wave to hip-hop to Hi-NRG electronic dance music. (Note: The first floor of the nightclub had wall-to-wall deep, soft carpeting; a large bar in an island in the center of the room; a concierge desk; a coat-check lounge; raised VIP seating areas, and a DJ booth. A large central stairs led to the second floor, which was mostly occupied by a dance floor. A stage here provided a performance space, which was used almost every weekend by hip-hop acts. On the third floor was the Red Room, a lounge with walls and furniture lined with crimson velvet. Dream also featured an outdoor deck, which overlooked the neighborhood. More than 3 million people attended the club between its opening in 2001 and August 2005.) The extreme popularity of Dream created several problems for Ivy City residents, including excessive traffic and parking problems, loud noise from patrons and automobiles, public urination, street fights, and even stabbings and gunfire. In an attempt to alleviate the parking problems, Dream began offering valet parking. To do so, it illegally closed the two blocks of Okie Street NE every night the club was open. Even individuals who lived on Okie Street had to pay $15 to park where they were legally entitled to do so. The club also illegally commandeered the loading dock at the shuttered Hecht's warehouse for parking. The club changed its name to Love in 2005, underwent a significant renovation, and opened a fourth floor.

In 2002, D.C. Mayor Anthony A. Williams announced yet another revitalization plan for Ivy City. This plan envisioned the purchase of existing but abandoned housing units, rehabilitating them, and either selling them or renting them at subsidized rates to low-income families. DCHA began purchasing distressed properties in Ivy City and offering them to developers. Developers could renovate the homes (at a profit), while DCHA would retain ownership and rent the improved property to low-income residents. To ensure that the renovated homes met the needs of existing residents, DCHA established the Ivy City Home Again Task Force, which arranged for meetings between existing DCHA tenants in Ivy City and potential developers. Residents gave their input as to which developer they preferred, opinions DCHA was bound by regulation to take into account when choosing which developer to work with.

That same year, Virginia Railway Express (VRE), a commuter rail line, began negotiations to purchase 2.3 acres (9,300 m^{2}) of the Ivy City rail yard from the yard's current owner, CSX Transportation, for use as a train storage yard. VRE succeeded in purchasing the land and began using it to store passenger coaches.

Ivy City residents discovered in September, 2003 that the District government intended to establish a homeless shelter at a warehouse at 1355–1357 New York Avenue NE. The move came about as the city announced the closure of its existing homeless shelter in the Gales School, a closed elementary school at 65 Massachusetts Avenue NW, in order to establish a center for abused children there. The city already leased the warehouse and had converted it into a halfway house for criminal offenders. After attempting to purchase the land, the city exercised eminent domain over it and seized it at a cost of $3.35 million ($5,458,000 in 2025 dollars). Ivy City residents were angered that their neighborhood, which already suffered from a high level of vagrancy, would attract a large number of homeless people. Despite extensive protests from Ivy City residents, the homeless shelter opened in mid-December 2003. The 200-bed facility also had a kitchen, laundry, and office space. A month later, the District government announced it was building two group homes for mentally disabled adults on the 1800 blocks of Kendall Street NE and Corcoran Street NE. The city also began construction on an 80-bed juvenile detention center at 1000 Mount Olivet Road NE. Many Ivy City residents denounced both plans, arguing that the city was using the neighborhood as a "dumping ground" for the city's problems.

By 2004, conditions in Ivy City had not materially improved since the 1980s, and in some cases had worsened. Almost one-third of the neighborhood's 6,000 residents lived below the poverty line, with a neighborhood median income of just $27,871 ($48,000 in 2025 dollars), more than 40 percent lower than the citywide median income of $44,180 ($75,000 in 2025 dollars). The city appeared to hold out little hope for Ivy City. In late 2004, Deborah Crain, and official in the Office of the Deputy Mayor for Planning and Economic Development, argued that all residents of Ivy City should be relocated, and the entire area razed for new commercial or industrial development.

In 2005, the Office of Planning in the D.C. Mayor's Office commissioned a $100,000 study, Northeast Gateway: Many Neighborhoods, One Community, which once more laid out an argument for rapid and intense revitalization of Ivy City. The report recommended that the city redevelop a portion of the neighborhood into a site suitable for a 50,000-square-foot (4,600 m^{2}) big-box store, and that the city encourage the various auto repair and auto parts stores to work together to build an "auto mall" where these businesses could operate in one place (rather than scattered about the neighborhood). The report also recommended that the city build a recreation center and improve the amount of affordable housing in the area.

=== Mid-2000s housing bubble and the adult club controversy ===
Economic conditions in Ivy City began to improve in 2005 as the United States housing bubble began to strengthen. By July 2005, land values in the area had risen appreciably. High-income home buyers began purchasing properties in the neighborhood, driving up prices. By November 20 percent of all home buyers in Ivy City had an income of $75,000 ($124,000 in 2025 dollars) or more. Rents rose sharply as property values rose, driving out elderly people on fixed incomes. Developers began flipping older properties and turning industrial buildings into condominiums. By mid-2006, the housing bubble was still going strong, and home prices in Ivy City were still surging. Some new homes sold for as much as $400,000 ($621,000 in 2025 dollars) or more.

In February 2006, a major controversy erupted over the relocation of several strip clubs, nearly all of them catering to gay patrons, to Ivy City. The clubs were being forced to move from their long-time locations in the Navy Yard district (a run-down, industrial and warehouse area) due to redevelopment and the construction of Nationals Park, the new home of the Washington Nationals major league baseball team. (Note: Beginning in the 1960s, a red-light district 10 blocks long—beginning at H Street NW near the White House—formed along 14th Street NW. This red-light district was redeveloped out of existence about 1988. Strip clubs in the city remained in two areas: Clubs catering to heterosexual clients tended to congregate in a few blocks of the western part of the Downtown area, while clubs targeting gay patrons clustered primarily in the western part of the Navy Yard. The D.C. City Council enacted a moratorium on new strip club licenses in 1994. The moratorium also barred these clubs from moving from their current locations. In 2001, redevelopment in the Navy Yard area pushed five strip clubs, most of them gay clubs, out of their long-time locations. D.C. City Council member Jim Graham, elected to office in 1998, subsequently proposed legislation in 2001 which would allow any strip club to move if it lost its location to redevelopment. Alarmed that strip clubs could move into their neighborhoods, other City Council members amended Graham's bill. The legislation passed in January 2001. Strip clubs were now only permitted in commercial- or industrial-zoned areas; must be at least 600 feet (180 m) from any school, community center, or residence; and must receive approval from the District of Columbia Alcoholic Beverage Control Board (ABC Board). Local residents were also given the right to essentially veto strip club relocation in ABC scoring procedures. In 2004, when the Washington Nationals major league baseball team relocated to the District of Columbia, the site of the team's new baseball stadium was almost directly atop the gay strip clubs. The stadium's construction forced all the city's gay strip clubs to relocate. Ward 5 proved to be the only ward in the city where the gay strip clubs could relocate, under the rules adopted in the 2001 legislation. One gay club, Edge/Wet, and two straight clubs, Club 55 and Big Chill, were denied relocation by Ivy City residents under the 2001 rules. Under legislation adopted in June 2007, only two clubs were permitted to move into a given ward. Due to opposition from local residents, only one club—the Glorious Men's Health Club—was able to relocate. All seven other clubs went out of business.) The controversy erupted after openly-gay D.C. City Council member Jim Graham announced he was sponsoring legislation to allow all eight strip clubs displaced by stadium construction to move to any location zoned for commercial or industrial use so long as it met already-established rules regarding location (e.g., not near schools or residences). Graham's bill temporarily lifted a city requirement that such moves be approved by the District of Columbia Alcoholic Beverage Control Board (ABC Board). Vincent Orange, the council member representing Ward 5, immediately called a meeting of local residents to inform them about Graham's bill. The tone of the meeting, held at a local church, became angry when gay businessman Bob Siegel announced he was considering purchase of a warehouse for use by a gay strip club at 1216 Mount Olivet Road NE. Residents decried the effect that nudity would have on the morals of local youth, and the gay clubs were accused of bringing bestiality into the neighborhood. One resident, noting that gay strip clubs often distributed condoms and personal lubricant free to customers, denounced the clubs as "pleasure pit[s]". Kathryn Pearson-West, a Ward 5 community activist, accused Graham of "picking on" a new council member (Thomas was in his year as Ward 5 council member) and low-income people. Some Ivy City residents argued that racism was at issue and that the city would never have considered putting a cluster of gay strip clubs in a white neighborhood. The club owners said that homosexuality was the real reason for the opposition. Philip Pannell, formerly the liaison to the LGBT community for Mayor Williams, later went much further, angrily denouncing opposition to the clubs as "sheer homophobia", saying that many Ivy City residents "don't fear gay people, they just hate them." Siegel did not purchase the property on Mt. Olivet Road, but did purchase 2120 West Virginia Ave NE and 2046 West Virginia NE. Two other properties were also purchased by gay strip club owners. In May 2007, 50 residents of Ivy City personally lobbied D.C. City Council members against Graham's bill. Over the next month, Ivy City residents held neighborhood rallies and distributed fliers to local residents to drum up opposition to the clubs.

In 2006, the Hecht's Warehouse was added to the National Register of Historic Places.

On June 5, 2007, the D.C. City Council passed the Graham bill, but with a key new restriction: The bill allowed no more than two adult businesses to move into a given ward. (Note: The legislation permitted clubs to stay in the Navy Yard district if they found space within 5,000 feet (1,500 m) of Nationals Park. One such club, the gay strip club and drag queen revue Secrets/Ziegfeld's, was able to do so. The bill also required strip clubs to be no closer than 1,200 feet (370 m) to one another, and required strip clubs to be no closer than 600 feet (180 m) from a church, school, library, or playground. Although the legislation permitted strip clubs to relocated without ABC Board approval, clubs were required to "build a relationship with civic leaders" before relocating.) With one adult business already situated in Ivy City (the Skylark Lounge, a strip club for heterosexuals located at 1943 New York Avenue NE) only one additional club could enter Ward 5. With Siegel already having purchased property for his 2120 Club (a gay strip club), that prohibited any other adult clubs, gay or straight, from relocating to Ward 5. But in June 2007, the 2120 Club was shuttered by city officials after the D.C. Zoning Commission discovered that Siegel had listed his property as "office space" rather than an adult business. (A gay adult bookstore and sex club, Glorious Health Club and Art Gallery, moved into the location shortly thereafter.)

Council member Harry Thomas Jr. later significantly altered his opposition to strip clubs in July 2011, when he endorsed heterosexual strip clubs in Ward 5—so long as they were "upscale". That year, the ABC Board approved an alcohol license for a new straight strip club, Club AKA 555, located at 2046 West Virginia Avenue NE. Ivy City residents, who remained largely unaware of the club's application, accused the ABC Board of turning Ivy City into a "dumping ground" for strip clubs and attempting to make the neighborhood "an unofficial red light district". A new citizens' group, the Ivy City Neighborhood Improvement Association, filed suit with the ABC Board to have the club's license revoked. The case remained unresolved as of August 2015. (Thomas later became the first sitting D.C. City Council member to be charged with a felony on January 4, 2012. He was convicted of embezzling more than $350,000 ($491,000 in 2025 dollars) in government funds and filing false tax returns. He was sentenced to 38 months in a federal prison and three years of probation.)

The housing bubble burst in late 2007, leading to the Great Recession of 2007 to 2009. Home mortgage foreclosures in Ward 5 were the highest in the city. As property values plunged in Ivy City, D.C. Mayor Adrian Fenty announced a new program in which four developers would transform 37 city-owned distressed properties (apartments and houses) in a six-block area of Ivy City into market-rate and subsidized housing for low-income families. In 2009, the District began implementing the Neighborhood Stabilization Program, which was part of the Emergency Economic Stabilization Act of 2008 (signed into law on October 3, 2008). This program provided $3.92 billion to help stabilized neighborhoods deeply affected by the subprime mortgage crisis. The District of Columbia spent $2.8 million ($4 million in 2025 dollars) to help low-income residents purchase homes or save their home from foreclosure.

=== Controversies and revitalization in the 2010s ===
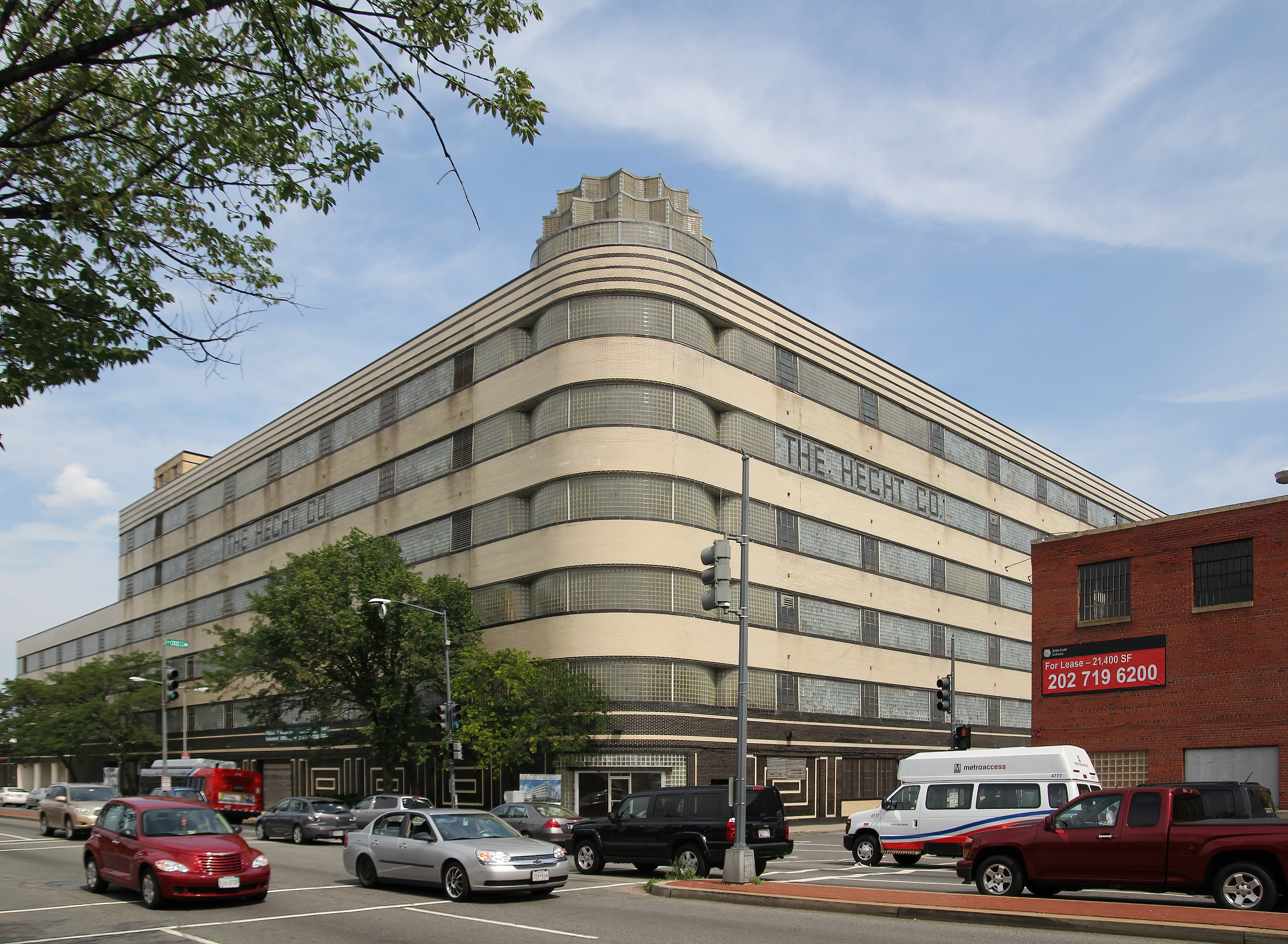
The Hecht's Warehouse in 2012, as it was about to undergo renovation

Housing prices in Ivy City remained substantially depressed into 2010. In October, Habitat for Humanity began building or renovating 38 townhouses in Ivy City. All the properties would be sold to low-income residents.

The Ivy City rail yard saw new activity beginning in March 2012, when MARC Train, the Maryland regional commuter train line, began construction on three tracks at the rail yard at a cost of $21.3 million ($30 million in 2025 dollars). The tracks were built to store MARC trains during midday layovers, reducing the time needed to get trains to Union Station during morning and afternoon rush hours. Amtrak still maintained some offices at the Ivy City rail yard as of 2013.

After the outcry against adult clubs in Ivy City, there was little opposition to the city's decision to allow medical marijuana to be grown in the neighborhood. The D.C. City Council adopted legislation permitting the cultivation of marijuana for medicinal use in the District of Columbia, and the law took effect in July 2010. Six companies were licensed to grow marijuana for this purpose, and the city granted a license to Holistic Remedies to open a cultivation facility on the 1800 block of Fenwick Street NE in March 2012.

Residents did become angry, however, when D.C. Mayor Vincent C. Gray announced a plan in June 2012 to build a temporary parking lot on the ground of the Crummell School to accommodate 65 intercity passenger buses while a bus terminal near Union Station was being rebuilt. Area activists claimed they had not been consulted before the plan was announced, and they objected to the noise, exhaust fumes, and traffic that they said would plague their neighborhood. When Michael Durso, a staff member in the office of the Deputy Mayor for Planning and Economic Development, met with residents in September 2012, he was verbally assaulted by Ivy City residents. When Mayor Gray declined to reconsider the plan, the citizens sued in D.C. Superior Court. The Washington Post columnist Courtland Milloy argued that Gray's action occurred because Ward 5 council member Harry Thomas Jr. had recently gone to prison and his successor, Kenyan McDuffie, had only been in office a few months. At trial, Deputy Mayor for Planning and Economic Development Victor L. Hoskins admitted that the city did not know what environmental or health laws or regulations it had to meet to relocate the bus parking, and that the cost of the temporary parking lot had never been estimated. Durso testified that at least six sites were considered for the bus parking lot, but only the Ivy City site had the proper zoning, access and space. D.C. Superior Court Judge Judith N. Macaluso, however, ruled on December 10 that the city had "deliberately disregarded" its own laws requiring local neighborhood consultation and that the city had "evaded environmental screening by mischaracterizing the project" on zoning and business occupancy documents. The injunction was temporary, however, and a series of court hearings occurred over the next two years as the city fought to build the parking lot at the Crummell School. In an attempt to stop the parking lot relocation, Ward 3 Councilmember Mary Cheh and Ward 5's Kenyan Duffie worked to secure $1.925 million ($3 million in 2025 dollars) in the city's 2015 budget to fund a community center at the Crummell School. The budget deal also included $7 million ($10 million in 2025 dollars) to renovate the structure in 2016. The court lifted its injunction in March 2014, after it found that the city was able to justify construction of the bus parking lot at the Crummell School under city and federal health and environmental laws. On April 1, 2014, Gray was defeated in the Democratic primary by D.C. City Council member Muriel Bowser, who went on to win the general election on November 5, 2014. On July 30, 2015, Mayor Bowser announced an end to the city's attempt to put a bus parking lot at the Crummell School. Instead, the city would disperse the buses to parking lots at Buzzard Point, Robert F. Kennedy Memorial Stadium and at curbside spaces around town.

Ivy City still remained in a deep economic depression by 2012. The unemployment rate among neighborhood residents was nearly 50 percent. Although the city planned to turn the Crummell School into a job training center, those plans were put on hold when the temporary parking lot announcement was made. Ivy City's economy was built around the three liquor stores, two take-out restaurants, Love nightclub and D.C. government agencies (the group home, school bus and public works vehicle parking lots, halfway house, and Youth Services Center). The neighborhood had no library, no playground, no day care facility and no community center.

Beginning in late 2012, however, Ivy City began to become a center for craft beer and distilled beverages. In December 2012, Atlas Brew Works announced it would open a craft beer brewery at 2052 West Virginia Avenue NE. Later that month, Green Hat Gin opened a distillery at 1832 Fenwick Street NE. A third distillery, One Eight Distilling, opened at 1135 Okie Street NE in January 2015, producing gin, vodka, and whiskey.

Ivy City's long-standing stormwater drainage problems began to be addressed in 2013. The solution went back to 2005, when the United States Environmental Protection Agency (EPA) sued the District of Columbia Water and Sewer Authority (DWSA) for extensive violations of the Clean Water Act. The District of Columbia had a combined sewer system. This meant that when stormwater and sewage were both dumped into the same sewer lines. Whenever precipitation was heavy, such as during a thunderstorm, the system became overwhelmed. The system then dumped mixed water (containing raw sewage and stormwater) into local rivers and streams untreated. This happened so frequently, and in such large amounts, EPA argued it violated federal clean water laws. Under a consent decree, DCWSA agreed to spend $2.6 billion ($4 billion in 2025 dollars) to construct six deep storage and conveyance tunnels to control combined sewer overflows into the Anacostia River, Potomac River, and Rock Creek watersheds: The Anacostia River Tunnel, the Blue Plains Tunnel, the First Street Tunnel, the Northeast Boundary Tunnel, the Potomac River Tunnel and the Piney Branch Tunnel (also known as the Rock Creek Tunnel). Meetings with Ivy City residents on the Northeast Boundary Tunnel construction, due to begin in 2017, began to be held in October 2013.

In 2014, a major redevelopment occurred in Ivy City when the Hecht's warehouse began to be renovated into apartments and retail space. The project began to move in December 2007, when Patriot Properties, a real estate development firm based in Philadelphia, purchased the warehouse for $78.5 million ($122 million in 2025 dollars). Patriot Properties said it would convert the property into a big-box store. But the Great Recession forced these plans to be rescinded. The bank foreclosed on the property in early 2011, and the loan was purchased by Douglas Development, a privately held local real estate development firm. In January 2014, Douglas Development president Douglas Jemal announced plans to convert the warehouse into a 300-unit apartment building. Jemal said his company would also construct more than 1,000 new parking spaces and add 250,000 square feet (23,000 m^{2}) of retail space to the ground floor. Construction began on the parking garage in January 2014, and MOM's Organic Market became the retail space's first anchor tenant. A second major anchor tenant, local bicycle shop BicycleSPACE, moved into the retail space in February 2015, Nike, Inc. opened its first store in D.C. in the retail space on April 3, and Planet Fitness became the fourth anchor on April 20, 2015. Jemal also won a commitment from Mindful Restaurants owner Ari Gejdenson to open three restaurants (one of them serving Italian cuisine) in a 7,000-square-foot (650 m^{2}) space at Hecht's. The redevelopment of the Hecht's Warehouse and addition of retail led Compass Coffee, a local coffee bean roaster with its own small chain of coffee shops, to build a new coffee roasting factory at 1401 Okie Street NE in April 2015. In May 2015, restaurant and bar entrepreneur Joe Englert and real estate investor Langdon Hample purchased 1240 Mount Olivet Road NE for $1.1 million ($1 million in 2025 dollars). They announced plans to demolish all existing structures on the site and build a $1 million ($1 million in 2025 dollars), 12,000-square-foot (1,100 m^{2}) building that would house a Rocky Mount Bouldering Corp. sporting gear shop and gymnasium (which will include a 40-foot (12 m) high, 8,000-square-foot (740 m^{2}) bouldering climbing wall), a 3,500-square-foot (330 m^{2}) coffee shop, and a 1,000-square-foot (93 m^{2}) beer garden with an outdoor patio.

The development was welcome news in Ivy City. But while the industrial sections along the neighborhood's eastern and western ends and along New York Avenue NE were improving, much of the residential area remained distressed. Nevertheless, property values began to soar significantly, with one home going for $410,000 ($556,900 in 2025 dollars)—double the average home price in the area in 2013. In July 2015, the city began holding meetings with Ivy City residents to seek input on what needs the Crummell School redevelopment should meet.

In May 2016, the city's first women-owned distillery, Republic Restoratives, opened at 1369 New York Avenue NE. The tasting room and distillery, located in a former warehouse, produced vodka, but would produce bourbon by 2018.

== About the neighborhood ==
No public school exists within Ivy City itself. The Wheatley Education Campus at 1299 Neal Street NE (about 0.75 miles (1.21 km) to the south in the Trinidad neighborhood) provides both elementary and middle school education. Dunbar High School at 101 N Street NW (about 1.5 miles (2.4 km) to the southeast in the Truxton Circle neighborhood) provides high school educational services for local students.

Ivy City is relatively isolated from the Washington Metro. The closest Metro station is the NoMa-Gallaudet U station on the Red Line, located about a block and a half from the intersection of New York Avenue NE and Florida Avenue NE (about a 30-minute walk from Ivy City). The D3, D4, and E2 Metrobus lines serve New York Avenue NE and West Virginia Avenue NE, with the D8 line serving Mt. Olivet Road NE. Ivy City is easily reached by automobile via New York Avenue NE.

== Pollution ==
In the 2020s, community activists mobilized to protest National Engineering Products, Inc. (NEPI), whose plant at Fenwick Place NE and Capitol Place NE produces various emissions. NEPI has since the 1930s manufactured chemical sealants for naval use, protected under "grandfathered" zoning laws that predate modern environmental regulations. Recent investigations revealed elevated levels of formaldehyde and other pollutants around its facility, raising concerns about long-term health impacts on nearby residents. Community organizer Sabrena Rhodes of advocacy group Empower DC had discovered the extent of NEPI's emissions after a 2018 fire linked to the plant.

Ivy City residents have since mobilized alongside Empower DC, which leads the DC Environmental Justice Coalition and serves as the D.C. lead for EPA Region 3's Thriving Communities Technical Assistance Center, to demand accountability from city officials and agencies. Some question whether their chronic health issues are linked to prolonged exposure to the plant's emissions.

Ivy City's Ward 5, one of the city's eight wards, contains half of D.C.'s industrial development. 64% of its residents are people of color or of other marginalized groups.

In 2023, Ward 5 Councilmember Zachary Parker introduced the Environmental Justice Amendment Act of 2023, which sought to strengthen oversight by creating an environmental justice commission and requiring cumulative impact assessments for polluting facilities. In general, this seeks to address the longstanding environmental inequities in Washington, D.C. First, it strives to establish a cumulative impact review through the Cumulative Impact Statements (CIS) for proposed projects or policies in overburdened communities. Second, it empowers cities to deny permits for projects that would significantly increase the environmental burdens and hazards. Third, it forms the new Energy and Environmental Justice Division within the DOEE to empower community participation. Fourth, it allows the mayor to fine or revoke permits that fail to meet mitigation requirements. Finally, it increases transparency of the cumulative impact assessments and mandates hearings and council approval for projects found to disproportionately harm vulnerable communities. In 2024, the council considered Ivy City Climate Resilience Hub Eminent Domain Authority Act of 2024, which would enable the D.C. mayor to remove NEPI from its current location.

Despite these efforts, D.C.'s Department of Energy and Environment (DOEE) has failed to enforce regulations. NEPI operates without a valid air permit. Organizers say justice demands legal consequences for polluters and better protections for the communities they affect. EPA testing has not found immediate threats. Further air sampling is ongoing.

The environmental injustice at Ivy City is also tied to its gentrification. For example, the Crummell School in Ivy City, a historically Black neighborhood in Washington, D.C., has become a symbolic battleground for environmental justice and equitable development. In 1977, the school was closed. Since then, it has been neglected and classified as a brownfield because of contamination from pollutants such as arsenic, lead, and chromium. A proposal to turn the Crummell site into a diesel bus lot was blocked because of existing environmental hazards.

Instead, two redevelopment proposals were made. First, Empower DC proposed 100% affordable housing, a health clinic, a community center, and a public park. This public park is crucial because of the urban heat island effect: areas without green space have higher temperatures because materials such as pavement and concrete absorb and hold more heat. Having a public park would not only contribute to mitigating the urban heat island effect but also clean the air and provide a space for physical activity and social cohesion. The second proposal was made by Ivy City's Partners, which envisioned a corporate expansion, notably the Profish seafood distributor. This plan appeals to the economic development and job access in Ivy City, which has high unemployment rates and poverty. Once neglected by city officials, Ivy City is now the focus of new investment and revitalization projects, as evident in Ivy City's Partners's plan. While its plans promise economic growth and job creation, many residents fear they will lead to displacement and the erasure of the neighborhood's cultural identity.

== Bibliography ==
- Baltimore and Ohio Railroad Company (1880). Annual Report of the President and Directors to the Stockholders of the Baltimore and Ohio Railroad Company for the Year Ended 30th of September, 1880 (Report). Baltimore, Md.: Press of Isaac Friedenwald.
- Baltimore and Ohio Railroad Company (1886). Sixtieth Annual Report of the President and Directors to the Stockholders of the Baltimore and Ohio Railroad Company for the Year Ended 30th of September, 1886 (Report). Baltimore, Md.: Press of John Cox's Sons.
- Baltimore and Ohio Railroad Company (1887). Sixty-First Annual Report of the President and Directors to the Stockholders of the Baltimore and Ohio Railroad Company for the Year Ended 30th of September, 1887 (Report). Baltimore, Md.: Press of John Cox's Sons.
- Bednar, Michael J. (2006). L'Enfant's Legacy: Public Open Spaces in Washington, D.C. Baltimore, Md.: Johns Hopkins University Press. ISBN 0801883180.
- Belmessous, Saliha (2014). "The Problem of Indigenous Claim-Making in Colonial History". In Belmessous, Saliha (ed.). Native Claims: Indigenous Law Against Empire, 1500-1920. New York: Oxford University Press. ISBN 9780199386116.
- Benedetto, Robert; Donovan, Jane; Du Vall, Kathleen (2003). Historical Dictionary of Washington, D.C.. Lanham, Md.: Scarecrow Press. ISBN 0810840944.
- Clark, Allen C. (1935). "Origin of the Federal City". Records of the Columbia Historical Society: 1–97.
- Committee on the District of Columbia (February 6, 1911). Reservation of Square No. 857, Washington, D.C., For Use As An Avenue. U.S. Senate. 61st Cong., 3d sess. S.Rept. 1073 (Report). Washington, D.C.: Government Printing Office.
- Committee on the District of Columbia (February 8, 1913). Reservation of Square No. 857, Washington, D.C., for Use as an Avenue. U.S. House of Representatives. 62d Cong., 3d sess. H.Rept. 1482 (Report). Washington, D.C.: U.S. Government Printing Office.
- Congressional Quarterly (2013). CQ Press Guide to Congress. Thousand Oaks, Calif.: CQ Press. ISBN 9781452235325.
- Cumfer, Cynthia (2007). Separate Peoples, One Land: The Minds of Cherokees, Blacks, and Whites on the Tennessee Frontier. Chapel Hill, N.C.: University of North Carolina Press. ISBN 9780807858448.
- Dilts, James D. (1996). The Great Road: The Building of the Baltimore and Ohio, the Nation's First Railroad, 1828–1853. Palo Alto, Calif.: Stanford University Press. ISBN 9780804726290.
- Fitzmaurice, Andrew (2014). "Powhatan Legal Claims". In Belmessous, Saliha (ed.). Native Claims: Indigenous Law Against Empire, 1500-1920. New York: Oxford University Press. ISBN 9780199386116.
- Gilmore, Matthew B.; Harrison, Michael R. (2002–2003). "A Catalog of Suburban Subdivisions of the District of Columbia, 1854–1902". Washington History: 26–55.
- Hagner, Alexander (1904). "Street Nomenclature of Washington City". Records of the Columbia Historical Society: 237–261.
- Hawkins, Don Alexander (Spring–Summer 1991). "The Landscape of the Federal City: A 1792 Walking Tour". Washington History: 10–33.
- Henning, George C. (1913). "The Mansion and Family of Notley Young". Records of the Columbia Historical Society: 1–24.
- McNeil, Priscilla W. (Spring–Summer 1991). "Rock Creek Hundred: Land Conveyed for the Federal City". Washington History: 35–51.
- Miller, Elizabeth J. (1984). "Dreams of Being the Capital of Commerce: The National Fair of 1879". Records of the Columbia Historical Society: 71–82.
- Otis, Lara (2012). "Washington's Lost Racetracks: Horse Racing from the 1760s to the 1930s". Washington History: 136–154.
- Prince, Sabiyha (2014). African Americans and Gentrification in Washington, D.C.: Race, Class and Social Justice in the Nation's Capital. Burlington, Vt.: Ashgate. ISBN 9781409446125.
- Romero, Victor M. (2014). "The Criminalization of Undocumented Migrants". In Lorentzen, Lois Ann (ed.). Hidden Lives and Human Rights in the United States: Understanding the Controversies and Tragedies of Undocumented Immigration. Santa Barbara, Calif.: Praeger. ISBN 9781440828478.
- Sternberg, George M. (December 17, 1908). "Report of Committee on Building Model Houses". Reports Relating to Affairs in the District of Columbia. Committee on the District of Columbia. U.S. Senate. 60th Cong., 2d sess. Senate Doc. No. 599 (Report). Washington, D.C.: Government Printing Office.
- Subcommittee on Surface Transportation (March 16, 1979). Authorize Funds for Completion of Northeast Corridor Improvement Project . Committee on Commerce, Science, and Transportation. U.S. Senate. 96th Cong., 1st sess (Report). Washington, D.C.: U.S. Government Printing Office.
- United States Congress (1901). Statutes of the United States of America Passed at the Second Session of the Fifty-Sixth Congress, 1900–1901. Washington, D.C.: U.S. Government Printing Office.
