= Snowden Ashford =

American architect (1866–1927)

- Ashford c. 1903
- Born: 1866; Washington, D.C., U.S.
- Died: 1927 (aged 60–61); Washington, D.C., U.S.
- Education: Lafayette College
- Occupation: Architect

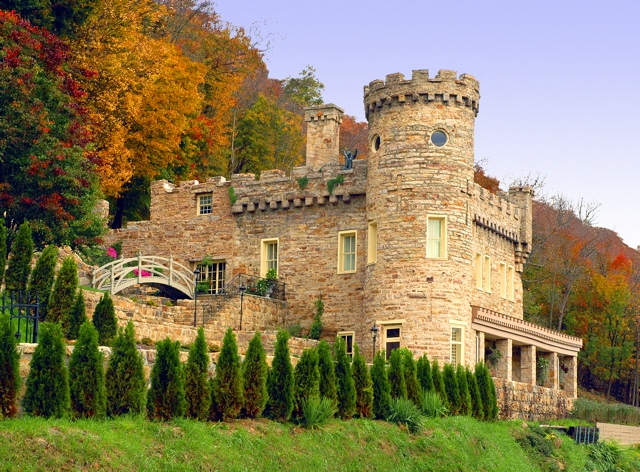
Berkeley Castle

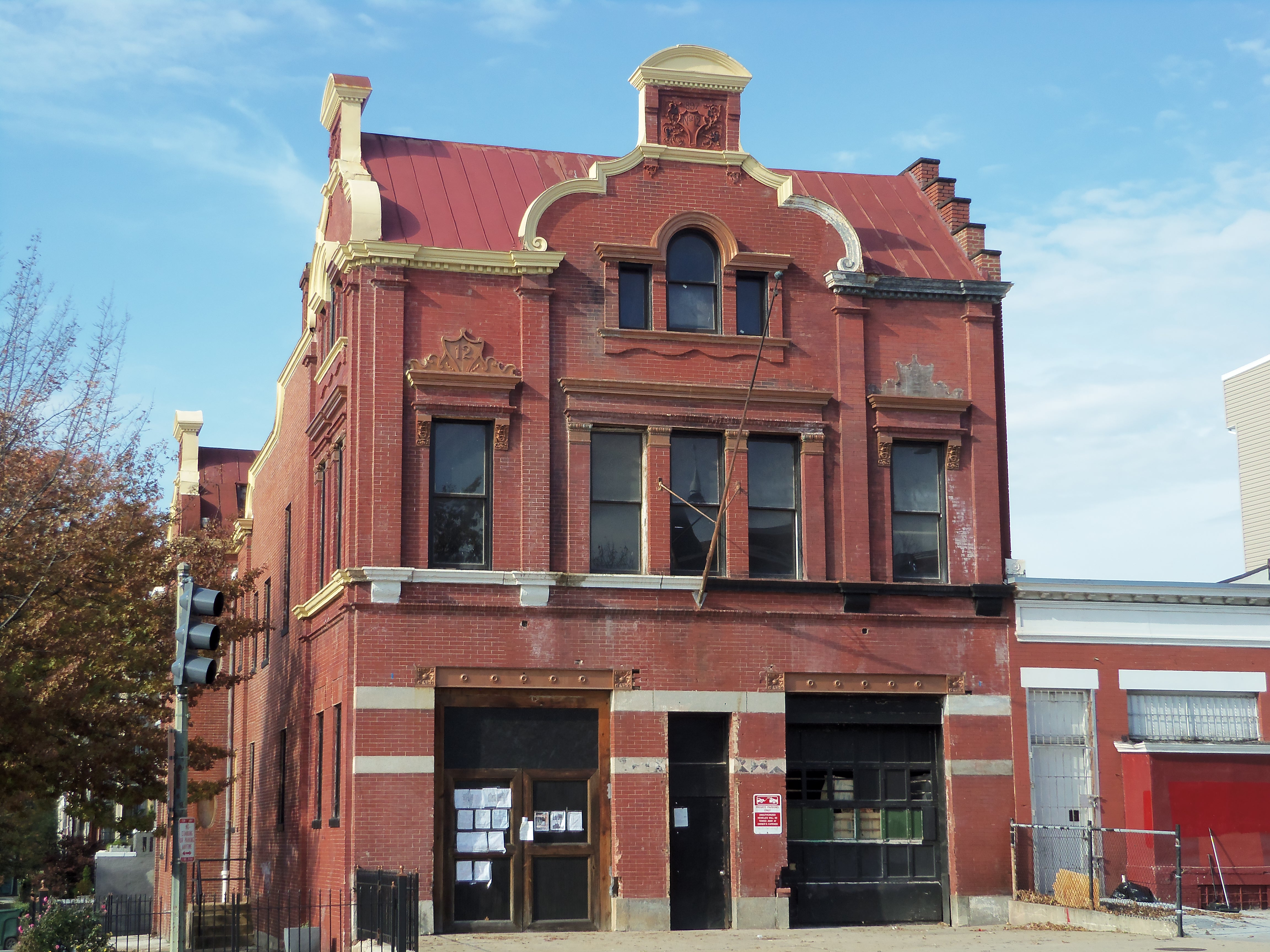
Engine Company 12, Washington, D.C.

Snowden Ashford (1866–1927) was an American architect who worked in Washington, D.C., his native city. Born on January 1, 1866, Ashford was educated at Rittenhouse Academy and at the Christian Brothers Roman Catholic school. He studied architecture at Lafayette College and, upon graduation, entered the office of Alfred B. Mullett, who had formerly been supervising architect of the United States Treasury. Ashford entered the District service in 1895 and became Washington's first municipal architect. The Washington Post characterized him as "Architect of the Everyday", and noted: "Ashford designed or supervised everything the District built between 1895 and 1921, including the North Hall at the Eastern Market. But he was most proud of his schools."

A number of his works are listed on the National Register of Historic Places (NRHP).

== Works ==
Works include:

- Samuel Taylor Suit Cottage, also known as the Berkeley Castle
- Eastern Market, Washington, D.C., 1908 expansion (North Hall)
- Alexander Crummell School, designed 1910, built 1913, Kendall and Gallaudet Streets, NE, Washington, D.C., NRHP-listed
- Military Road School, 1375 Missouri Ave., NW, Washington, D.C., NRHP-listed
- Jesse Reno School, designed 1903
- Normal School for Colored Girls, 2565 Georgia Ave., NW., Washington, D.C., NRHP-listed as the Miner Normal School, built 1913
- Park View School, Washington, D.C., school built 1916, NRHP-listed
- Dunbar High School, Washington, D.C., original building 1916 (demolished 1977)
- Municipal Fish Market completed in 1918
- Nathaniel Parker Gage School, addition designed by Ashford
- Duke Ellington School of the Arts (formerly Western High School), Washington, D.C.
- Eastern High School, Washington, D.C.
- Engine Company 12, 1626 N. Capitol St., NW, Washington, D.C., NRHP-listed
- Engine Company 17, 1235 Monroe St. NE, Washington, D.C., NRHP-listed
- Engine Company 23, 2119 G, NW Washington, D.C., NRHP-listed
- Engine Company No. 25, 3203 Martin Luther King Jr., Ave SE, Washington, D.C., NRHP-listed
- Margaret Murray Washington School, 27 O St., NW, Washington, D.C., NRHP-listed
