= Engine Company 17 =

- U.S. National Register of Historic Places
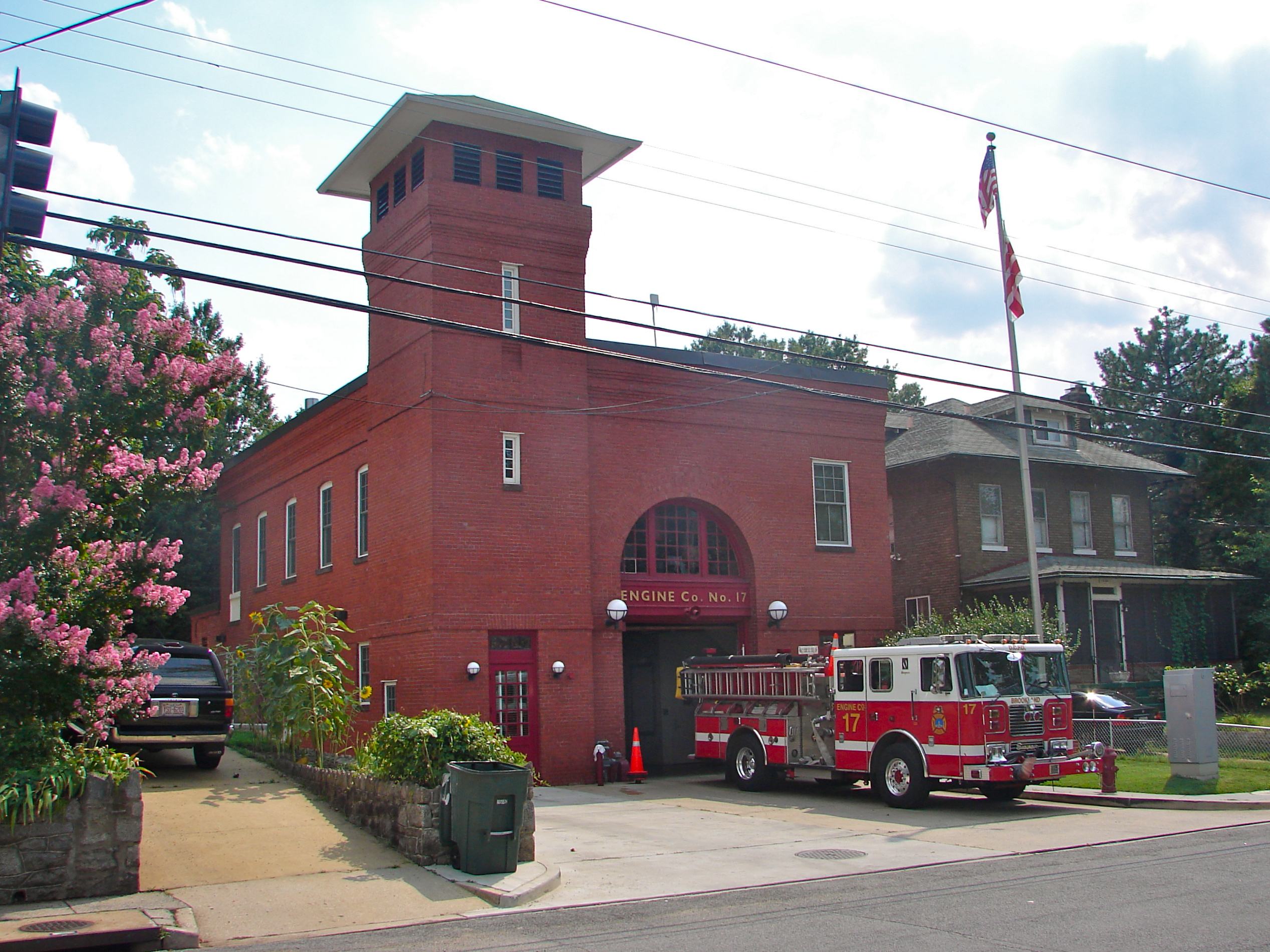
- Firehouse in 2010

- Location within District of Columbia
- Location: 1235 Monroe St. NE, Washington, District of Columbia
- Coordinates: 38°56′3″N 76°59′23″W
- Area: less than one acre
- Built: 1902
- Architect: Snowden Ashford
- Architectural style: Italianate
- MPS: Firehouses in Washington DC MPS
- NRHP reference No.: 07000538
- Added to NRHP: June 6, 2007

Engine Company No. 17 also known as Chemical Company No. 4 and the Brookland Firehouse, is a historic firehouse located at 1227 Monroe Street, NE, Washington, D.C. It was constructed in 1902 and housed an early “chemical company” which fought fires in outlying districts using large soda-acid extinguishers rather than using steam pumpers on the unreliable municipal water supply. The firehouse was innovative at the time of its construction, having a built-in electrical system, and it was designed to make use of the new call box system installed in the neighborhood. It was officially designated Engine Company 17 in 1905.

It is built in the Romanesque Revival style with an asymmetrical design with both load-bearing masonry and structural iron. It was likely designed by Municipal Architect John B. Brady. In 2007 the building was listed on the National Register of Historic Places as part of the Firehouses of Washington DC MPS.
