= Samuel Taylor Suit Cottage =

Historic house in West Virginia, United States

- U.S. National Register of Historic Places
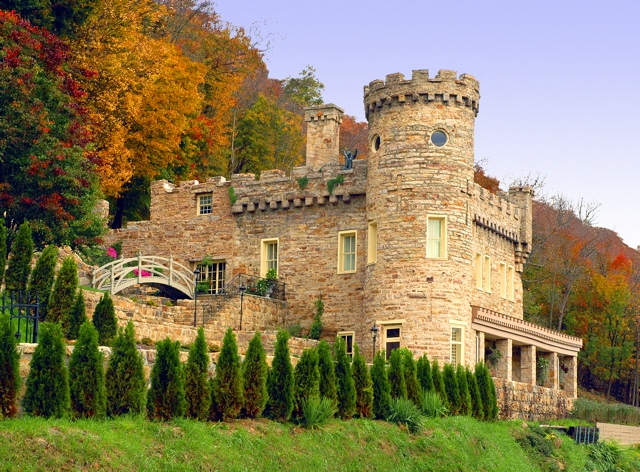

- Location within Eastern Panhandle of West Virginia Location within West Virginia Location within the United States
- Location: 276 Cacapon Road, Berkeley Springs, West Virginia
- Coordinates: 39°37′38″N 78°13′49″W
- Built: 1885
- Architect: Mullett, A.B. and Ashford, Snowden
- Architectural style: Late Victorian
- NRHP reference No.: 80004035
- Added to NRHP: November 28, 1980

The Samuel Taylor Suit Cottage, also known as the Berkeley Castle or Berkeley Springs Castle, is located on a hill above Berkeley Springs, West Virginia, United States.

== History ==
The castle-like house was built for Colonel Samuel Taylor Suit of Washington, D.C. as a personal retreat near the spa town, beginning in 1885. It was not complete by the time of his death in 1888 and was finished in the early 1890s for his young widow, Rosa Pelham Suit, whom Suit had first met at Berkeley Springs, and their three children. The post-1888 work is of noticeably inferior quality.

The fifteen-room interior features a ballroom 50 feet (15.2 m) wide and 40 ft (12.2 m) long. The design is attributed to Washington architect Alfred B. Mullett, who is alleged to have drawn a rough sketch of the plan on a tablecloth at the Berkeley Springs Hotel. The design may have been based on elements of Berkeley Castle in Gloucestershire, United Kingdom. Detailed design and construction supervision was carried out by Snowden Ashford, who designed Washington's Eastern Market, apprenticed for Mullett and is also credited as an architect. Mrs. Suit entertained lavishly at the house until her money ran out and the property was sold in 1913.

== Purchase by the VDARE Foundation ==
In February 2020, the property was purchased by the VDARE Foundation, a tax-exempt affiliate of anti-immigration organization VDARE, which publishes writings by white nationalists.

The purchase was met with resistance from residents and leaders in Berkeley Springs.

VDARE founder and editor Peter Brimelow stated "We absolutely will not be having rallies, marches or demonstrations. We've never been involved in anything like that, and we never will be," and "We just want to be quiet, good neighbors. The only public events we're anticipating right now are the local charitable functions that we understand the castle has traditionally hosted. We hope to have some private meetings and functions, but don't have plans for any public VDARE events."

VDARE purchased the house for $1.4 million and the source of the money is unknown. New York Attorney General (NYAG) Letitia James alleged that VDARE had violated New York law by misusing non-profit resources while residing on the castle grounds since March 2020.

In March 2024, a New York state judge found the VDARE Foundation in civil contempt for failing to turn over evidence related to the investigation. The organization is required to pay a $250-per-day fine until it complies with a subpoena issued by the NYAG in 2022. In July, it was announced that VDARE would be suspending operations, with Brimelow resigning as president of the VDARE Foundation. A spokesperson for the attorney general's office said that the website's closure would not affect their investigation.
