= Samuel Taylor Suit =

American businessman (1832–1888)

Samuel Taylor Suit (1832–1888) was a Maryland politician and landowner. Suit was born in Bladensburg, Maryland, the son of innkeeper Fielder Suit. At age 14, he left home and traveled first to Keokuk, Iowa, and then to Louisville, Kentucky. In Kentucky, Suit became involved in distilling whiskey, eventually owning a distillery and making his fortune. During this time, he became an honorary Kentucky colonel and was known as Colonel Suit from that time onward. While in Kentucky, he married his first wife, Sarah Ebenezer Williams, who died in childbirth at age 19.

In August 1862, Suit donated a set of regimental flags to the Chicago Board of Trade, which were presented to what became the First Board of Trade Regiment, or 72nd Illinois Infantry. The flags were labeled "Presented by S T Suit, of Louisville KY, to the First Board of Trade Regiment", and were carried by the regiment through the war, it is believed they were burned in the Chicago Fire. Suit left Louisville and moved to New York City, where he obtained a seat on the New York Stock Exchange. In New York he met Aurelia Wilmarth, daughter of Home Life Insurance Company of New York president Arthur Wilmarth, and they were married in 1859. A son was born in 1861, but the marriage proved contentious.

In 1867, Suit moved back to Maryland with his family, and purchased a more than 300-acre (1.2 km^{2}) estate near Washington, D.C. The property, which became known as Suitland, is now the town of Suitland, Maryland. Suit set up a new distillery nearby under the name "S.T. Suit" and invested in railroads. He imported rare birds such as canaries and swans to his property and was known for his orchard of fruit trees.The estate was visited by U.S. Presidents Ulysses S. Grant and Rutherford B. Hayes, and was the scene of negotiations to settle the Alabama Claims.

From 1873 to 1877, Suit was a Maryland state senator. In 1876 the Suitland mansion was destroyed by fire, causing Suit to declare bankruptcy. While Suit recovered his properties and finances, the Suitland house was never rebuilt. In 1878 Aurelia left, and they were divorced by 1879.

At about this time, Suit met Rosa Pelham at the spa in Berkeley Springs, West Virginia. She was the daughter of U.S. Representative Charles Pelham of Alabama. They were married in 1883, when Samuel was 51 and Rosa was 22. They soon had three children.

The Suits were regular visitors to Berkeley Springs. In 1885, they started construction of their own private residence there: the Samuel Taylor Suit Cottage or "Berkeley Castle". The family took up residence in August 1887.

Suit died on October 1, 1888, at his residence on New Jersey Avenue in Washington. He is buried in St. Barnabas Cemetery, Temple Hills, Maryland. In his will, Suit left $500 to St. Barnabas Church and bequeathed the rest to his family.

"Berkeley Castle" was not complete at the time of Samuel's death, but Rosa completed the house in the 1890s. She sold the Suitland estate in 1902 to pay debts. The castle was sold in 1913. It is now the headquarters of a white supremacy group, the VDare Foundation.
