= Engine Company 12 =

- U.S. National Register of Historic Places
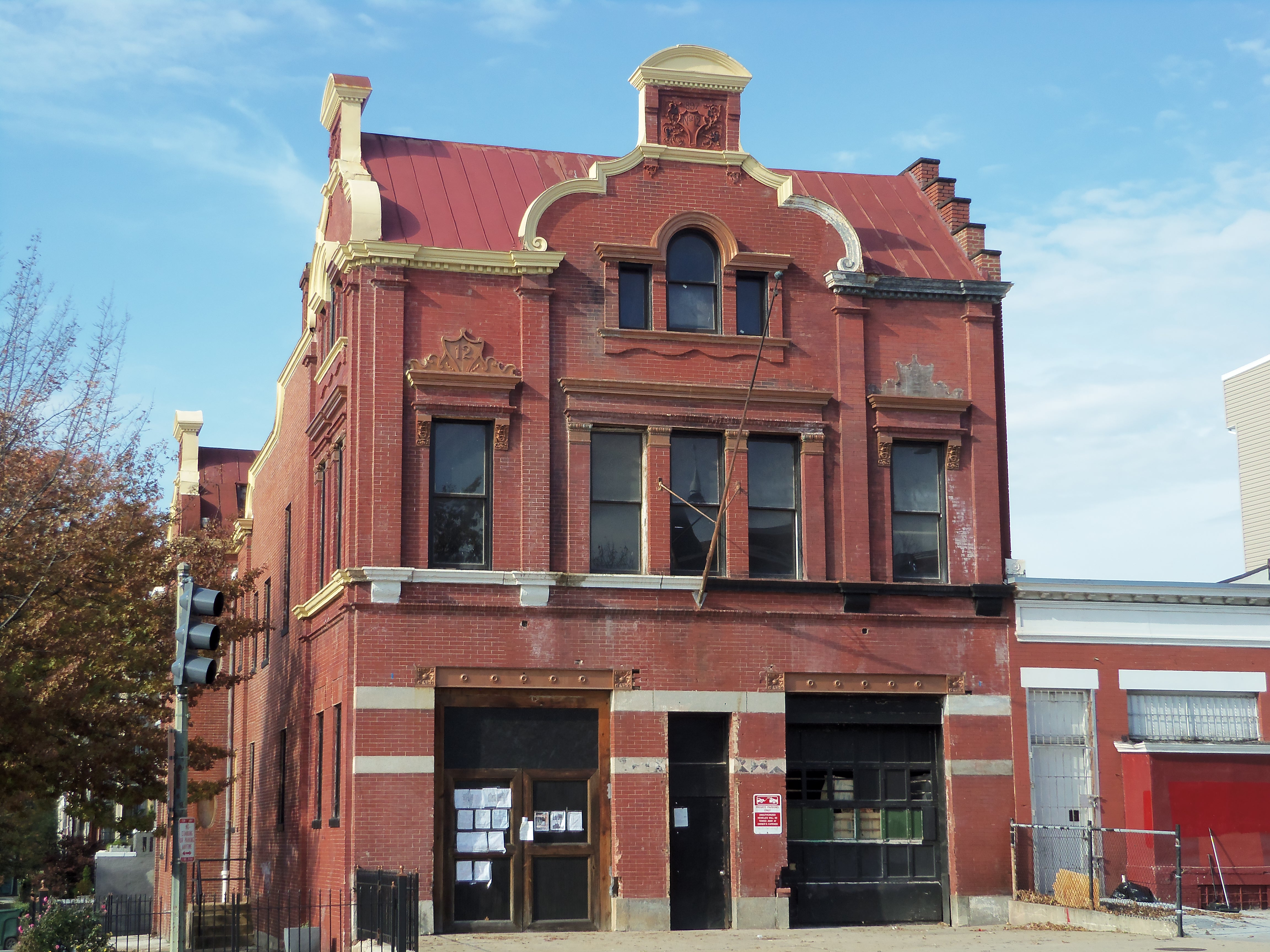
- Engine Company 12 building (2012)

- Location within District of Columbia
- Location: 1626 N. Capitol St., NW; Washington, D.C.
- Coordinates: 38°54′43.1886″N 77°0′34.038″W
- Architect: Snowden Ashford
- Architectural style: Colonial Revival
- MPS: Firehouses in Washington DC MPS
- NRHP reference No.: 07000537
- Added to NRHP: June 6, 2007

Engine Company 12 is a former fire station and a historic structure located in the Bloomingdale neighborhood and on North Capitol Street in Washington, D.C. The engine company was established on July 1, 1897, with an 1884 Clapp & Jones 450 GPM steam fire engine and an 1887 E. B. Preston hose reel carriage. The three-story brick building was designed by Washington architect Snowden Ashford in the Colonial Revival style. It was listed on the National Register of Historic Places in 2007.

The building was damaged by a three-alarm fire in December, 2023.
