= Alexander Crummell School =

- U.S. National Register of Historic Places
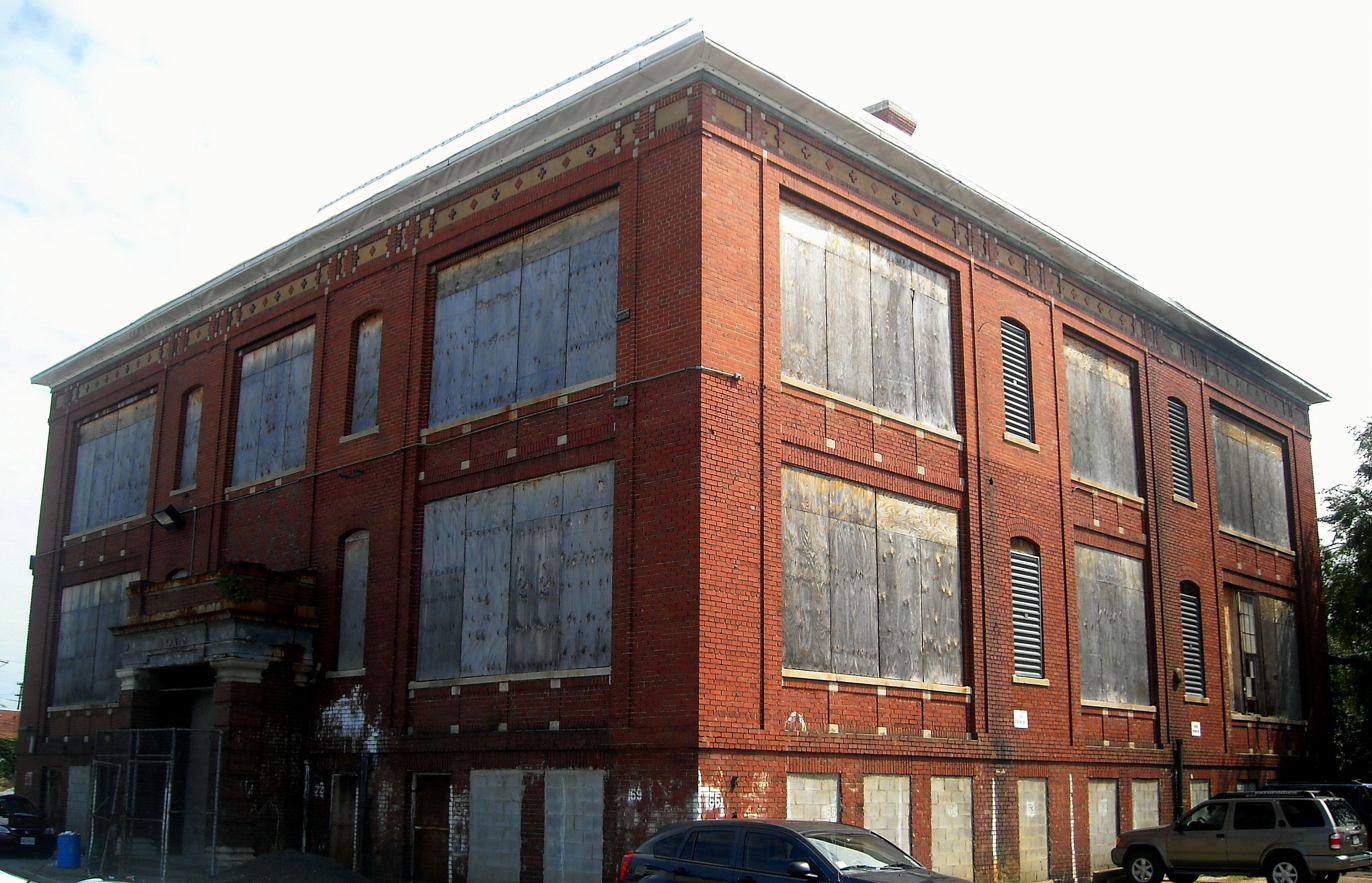
- Alexander Crummell School in 2008

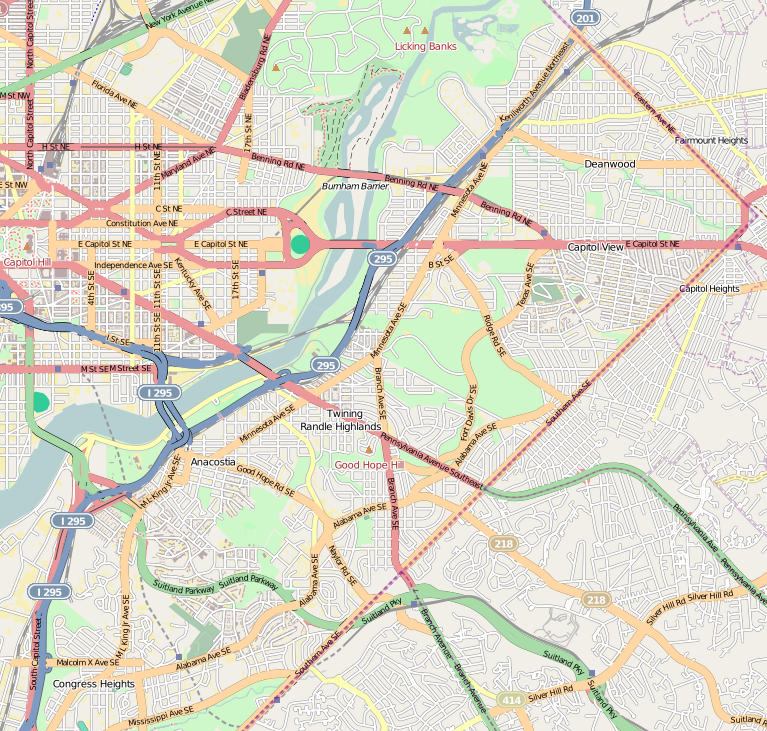
- Location within Washington, D.C. Location within the District of Columbia Location within the United States
- Location: NE., Washington, D.C.
- Coordinates: 38°54′49″N 76°59′10″W
- Built: 1910
- Architect: Snowden Ashford
- Architectural style: Elizabethan Revival
- NRHP reference No.: 03000671
- Added to NRHP: July 25, 2003

The Alexander Crummell School is an Elizabethan Revival school building, located at 1900 Gallaudet Street and Kendall Street, Northeast, Washington, D.C., in the Ivy City neighborhood.

== History ==
It was designed by Snowden Ashford in 1910, and named for educator and Episcopal priest the Rev. Alexander Crummell. It was built in 1911 by Allan T. Howlson for $44,987.00. It was dedicated on November 23, 1911. It was closed in 1977. A community group used the school as a preschool, library, job training center, and daycare center. During the 1990s, the property was used by an automobile auctioneer.

In 2012, the District government, under Mayor Vincent Gray, decided to relocate tour bus parking from Union Station to the Crummell School, paving the schoolyard, fencing in the property, and adding pylons to protect the historic building from buses running into it. Empower DC sued the DC government, and won injunctions preventing the city from actually using the historic schoolyard, dedicated to the teaching of African Americans, as a parking lot. The city, blocked from using it as a tour bus parking lot, dropped the tour bus plan in 2016, instead putting an RFP out for private developers to bid on.

The D.C. Historic Preservation Review Board listed it on May 23, 2002. It was listed on the National Register of Historic Places, in 2003. The DC Preservation League placed it on its endangered list.

In 2016, it was part of a redevelopment plan. As of November 2020, the building is still vacant.

== See also ==
- National Register of Historic Places listings in Washington, D.C.
