= Engine Company 23 =

- U.S. National Register of Historic Places
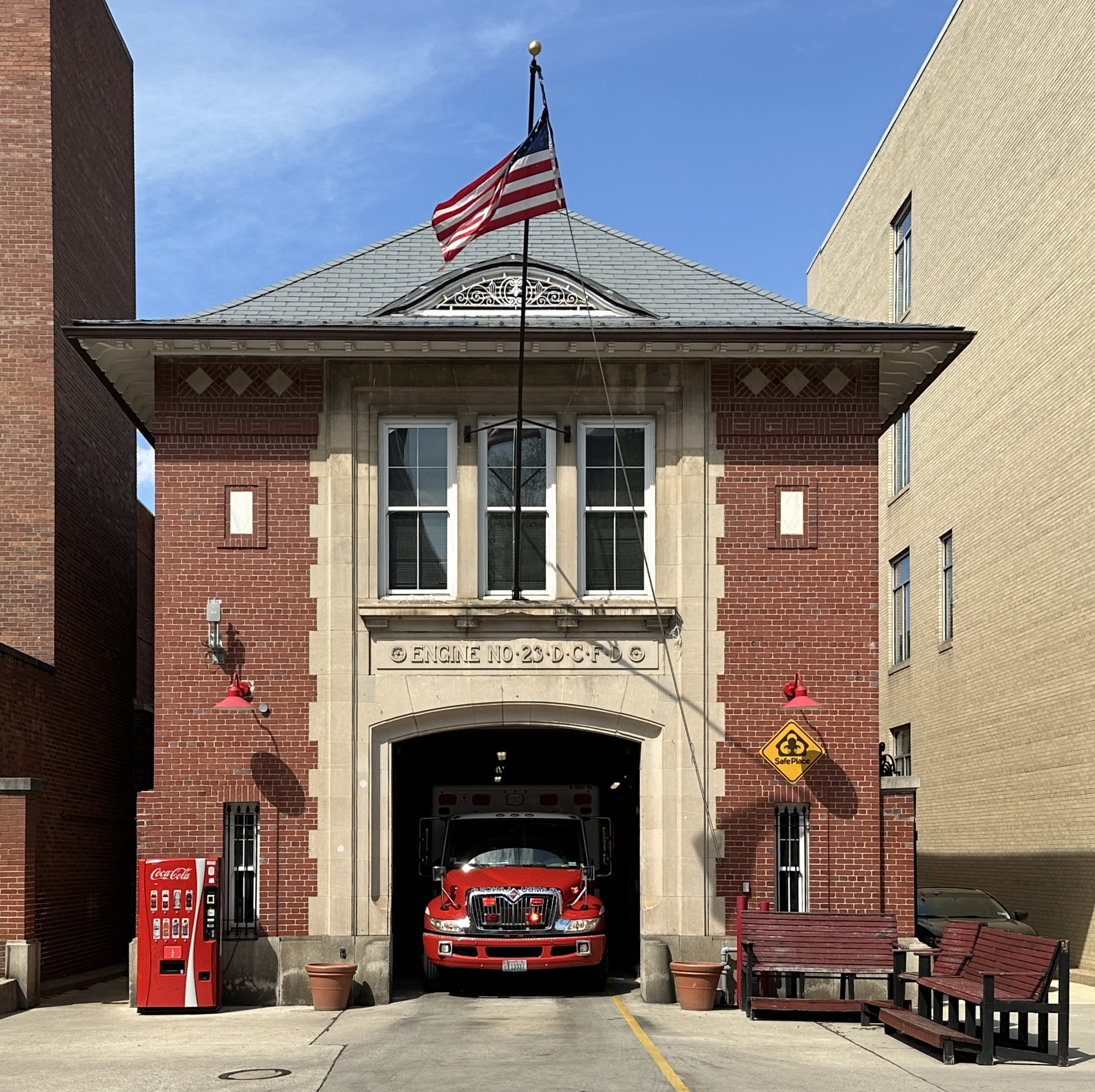
- Engine Company 23 in 2026

- Location within District of Columbia
- Location: 2119 G St., NW; Washington, D.C.
- Coordinates: 38°53′54.798″N 77°02′51.518″W
- Built: 1910
- Architect: Snowden Ashford
- Architectural style: Italianate
- MPS: Firehouses in Washington DC MPS
- NRHP reference No.: 07000540
- Added to NRHP: June 6, 2007

Engine Company 23 is a fire station and a historic structure located in the Foggy Bottom neighborhood of Washington, D.C. The two-story Italianate style building was a collaboration of the Washington, D.C. architectural firm of Hornblower & Marshall and District of Columbia Municipal Architect Snowden Ashford. It was built in 1910. The exterior of the structure features segmental-arched vehicle openings and quoined limestone frontispiece. It was listed on both the District of Columbia Inventory of Historic Sites in 2005 and on the National Register of Historic Places in 2007. The building sits on the campus of the George Washington University near Kogan Plaza.
