= North Capitol Street =

Street in Washington, D.C.

- North Capitol Street NE; North Capitol Street NW
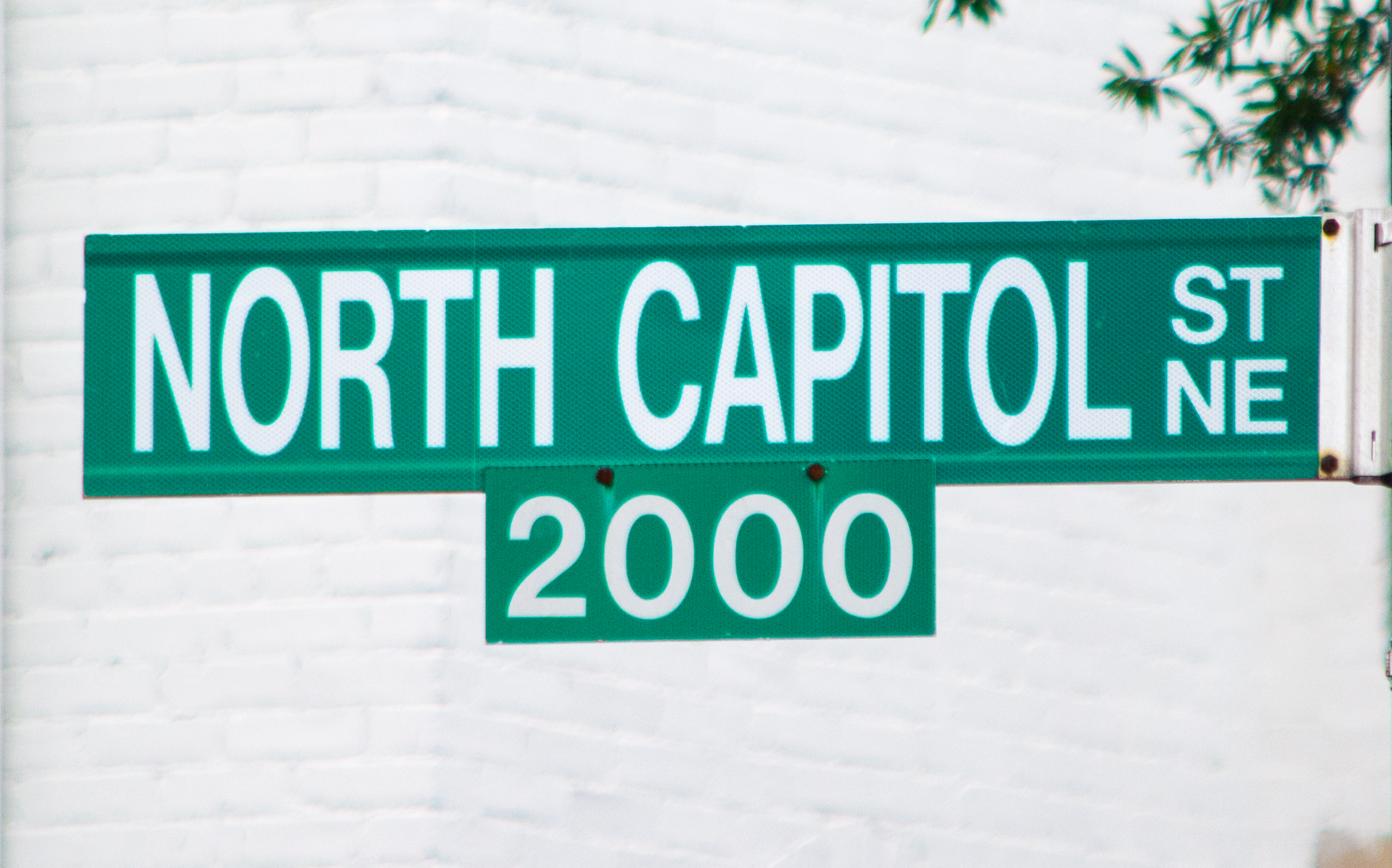
- North Capitol Street sign
- Interactive map of North Capitol Street
- Maintained by: DDOT
- Location: Washington, D.C., U.S.
- South end: D Street
- Major junctions: Massachusetts Avenue; H Street; US 50 (New York Avenue); Florida Avenue; US 1 (Rhode Island Avenue); New Hampshire Avenue
- North end: Eastern Avenue

North Capitol Street is a street in Washington, D.C., United States, that separates the Northwest and Northeast quadrants of the city.

== Route description ==
North Capitol Street begins at D Street in Lower Senate Park, between Louisiana and Delaware Avenues north of the United States Capitol. It continues in a straight line northward until it reaches Michigan Avenue, where it curves eastward and then westward around the Washington, D.C., VA Medical Center and the Armed Forces Retirement Home. For the 1.1 miles (1.8 km) between Irving Street and Clermont Drive, North Capitol Street is a limited-access road. North Capitol Street ceases to exist after Harewood Road. For 0.4 miles (0.64 km), it is named Clermont Drive. Beginning at Allison Street, Clermont Drive becomes Hawaii Avenue. Just after passing Buchanan Street, Hawaii Avenue reverts back to being North Capitol Street. North Capitol Street ceases to exist again at McDonald Place, and becomes Blair Road (which veers north-northeast). About 2,185 feet (666 m) due north of this transition, on Chillum Place just north of Kansas Avenue, North Capitol Street reappears. It continues to exist until it reaches Eastern Avenue, which marks the D.C.-Maryland border.

== Current state ==
North Capitol Street divides the Northwest and Northeast quadrants of the District of Columbia and includes many Washington D.C. neighborhoods including Bloomingdale, Eckington, NoMa, and Truxton Circle. The corridor is separated in two police districts (5D and 3D). Since the 1980s, North Capitol Street has suffered as one of highest crime areas in the District of Columbia, being ravaged by crack cocaine and the effects of drug lords Rayful Edmond and Tony Lewis who ran drug operations in Near Northeast and the unit block of Hanover Place NW. The impact of this destruction is still seen throughout the community today. While North Capitol Street services commuters as a thoroughfare, it is also a community of local residents, school children, and businesses.

== History ==
By 1887, North Capitol Street ended at T Street. The Commissioners of the District of Columbia decided to build a new segment of North Capitol Street from Boundary Street (now Florida Avenue) through Prospect Hill Cemetery in 1887. The plan was protested by about 400 German-Americans who owned cemetery lots at Prospect Hill Cemetery. A committee of the U.S. House of Representatives investigated the matter. The Commissioners ended up building North Capitol Street discontinuously, with one section running from Florida Avenue to T Street and another section going from Adams Street to the Armed Forces Retirement Home, in order to not go through the cemetery.

In 1892, the House of Representatives considered extending North Capitol Street to the Armed Forces Retirement Home. After continued oppositions of German-Americans living in the area, the House of Representatives passed a bill to extend North Capitol Street through the Prospect Hill Cemetery and continuing to the Armed Forces Retirement Home. When fences were put up as part of the street extension, the directors of the Prospect Hill Cemetery tore down the fences. Landowners filed a lawsuit to prevent the condemnation of land between T Street and Florida Street, which was owned by the Balbour family, and to prevent the condemnation of land in Prospect Hill Cemetery. The court examined the will of David Balbour, who had died ten years earlier, over who had inherited the land between T Street and Florida Avenue. The court decided that the District could not simply acquire the cemetery's land through condemnation and that the land could only be purchased based on its worth for cemetery purposes. Congress passed a bill to appropriate money to buy the land from the cemetery, and President Grover Cleveland signed the bill in 1897.

== Landmarks on North Capitol Street ==
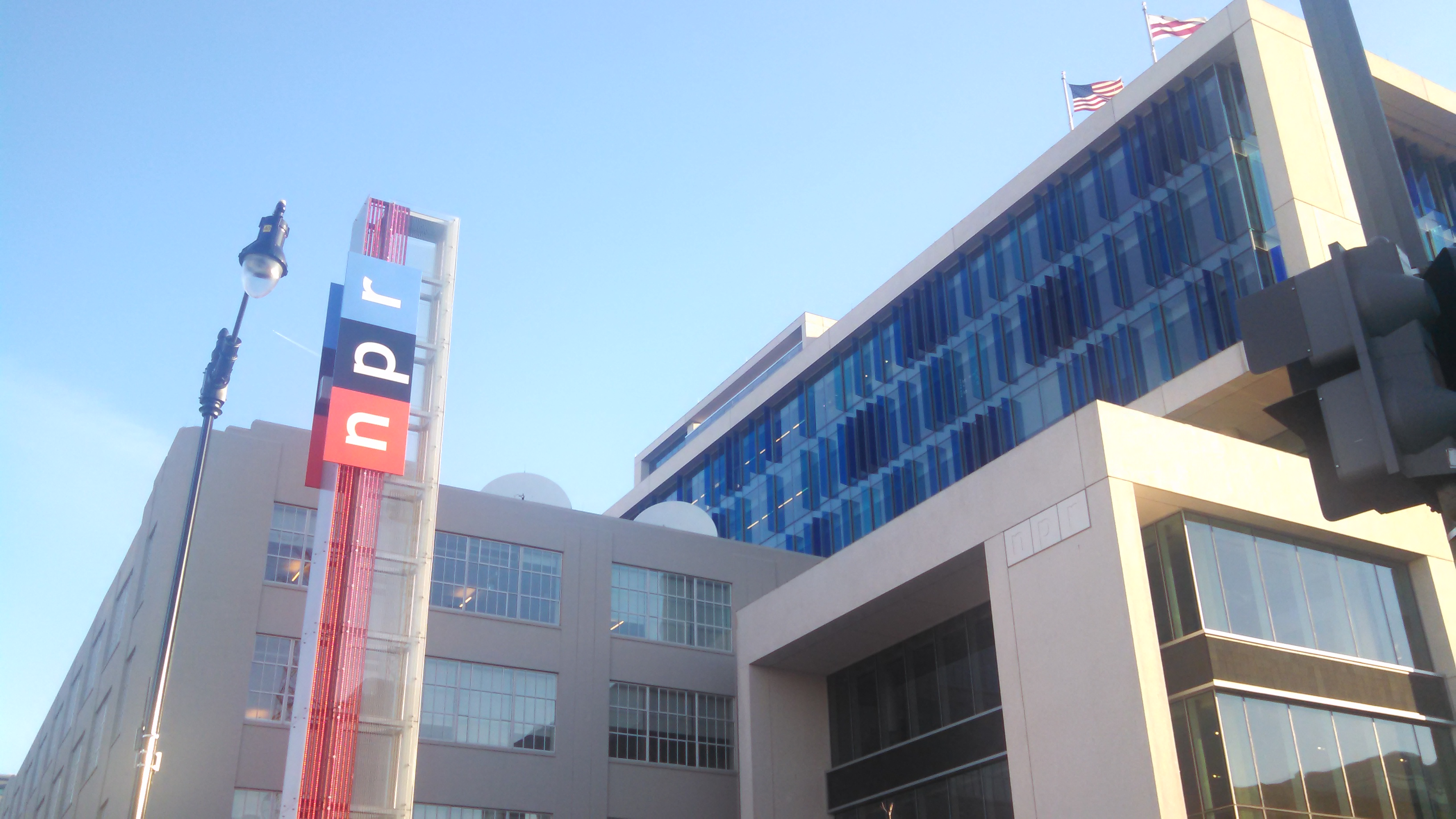
NPR building at the corner of L Street and North Capitol Street

- Engine Company 12
- Lower Senate Park (at the southern terminus of North Capitol Street, at Louisiana Avenue NW)
- C-SPAN (400 North Capitol Street)
- Holodomor Memorial
- National Postal Museum (at North Capitol Street and Massachusetts Avenue NW)
- United States Government Publishing Office headquarters (732 North Capitol Street)
- Gonzaga College High School (at North Capitol Street and K Street NW)
- NPR (1111 North Capitol Street)
- Prospect Hill Cemetery (2201 North Capitol Street)
- McMillan Sand Filtration Site (between Channing Street and Michigan Avenue)
- Washington, D.C., VA Medical Center (between Michigan Avenue and Irving Street)
- Armed Forces Retirement Home (between Irving Street and Harewood Road)
- United States Soldiers' and Airmen's Home National Cemetery (between Harewood Road and Allison Street)
- Rock Creek Cemetery (between Hawaii Avenue and Farragut Place)
