= District of Columbia Fire and Emergency Medical Services Department =

Fire department in the District of Columbia, in the United States

Operational area
- Country: United States
- Federal district: District of Columbia

Agency overview
- Established: July 1, 1804; 222 years ago
- Annual calls: ~212,459 (2019)
- Employees: 2,153 (2019)
- Annual budget: $258,502,000 (2019)
- Staffing: Career
- Fire chief: John A. Donnelly, Sr.
- Mayor of Washington, DC: Muriel Bowser
- EMS level: Advanced Life Support (ALS) and Basic Life Support (BLS)
- IAFF: 36

Facilities and equipment
- Battalions: 9
- Stations: 34
- Engines: 33
- Tillers: 15
- Platforms: 1
- Rescues: 3
- Ambulances: 43
- HAZMAT: 2
- USAR: 1
- Airport crash: 1
- Wildland: 1
- Fireboats: 4
- Light and air: 2

Website
- Official website
- IAFF website

The District of Columbia Fire and Emergency Medical Services Department (also known as DC FEMS, FEMS, DCFD, DC Fire, or DC Fire & EMS), established July 1, 1804, provides fire protection and emergency medical service for the District of Columbia, in the United States. An organ of the devolved district government, Fire & EMS is responsible for providing fire suppression, ambulance service and hazardous materials containment for the federal district.

== History ==
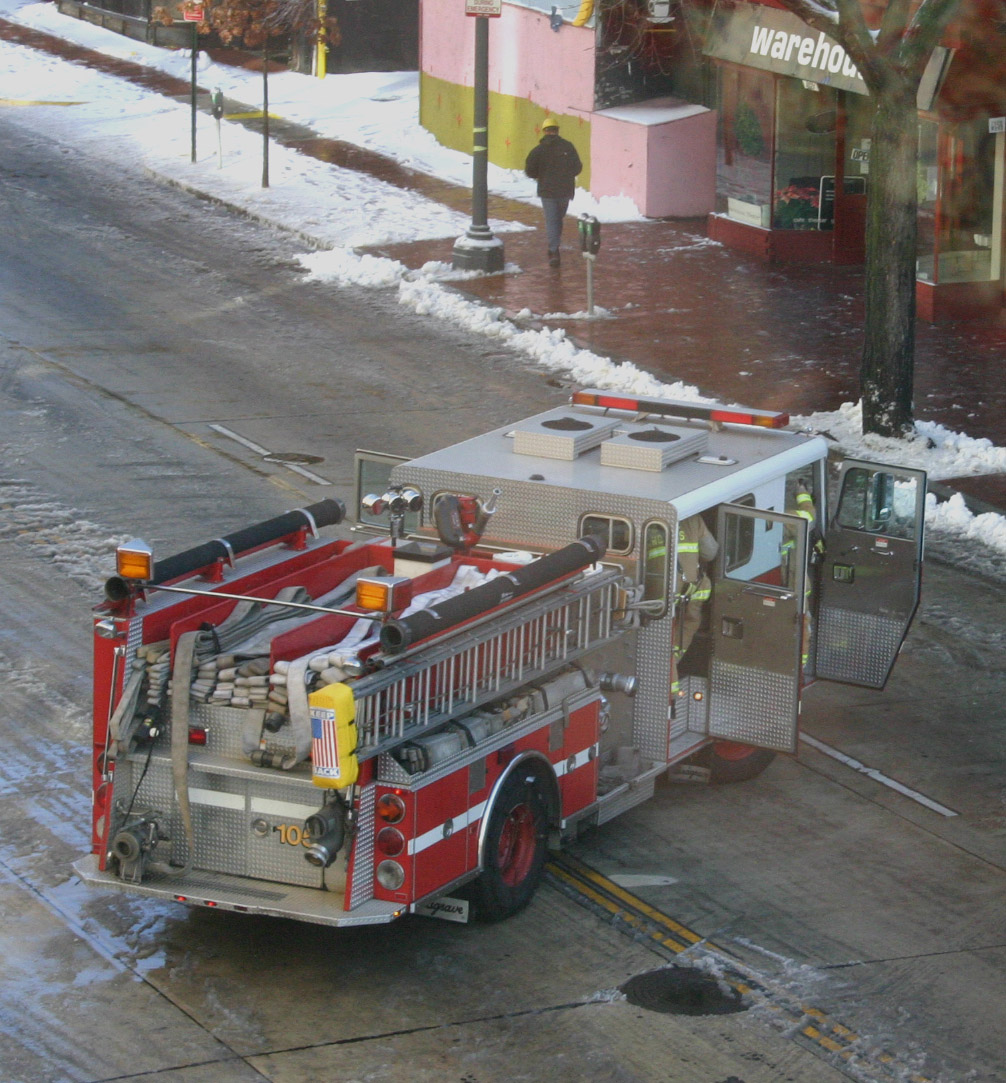
A DCFD fire engine in December 2005.

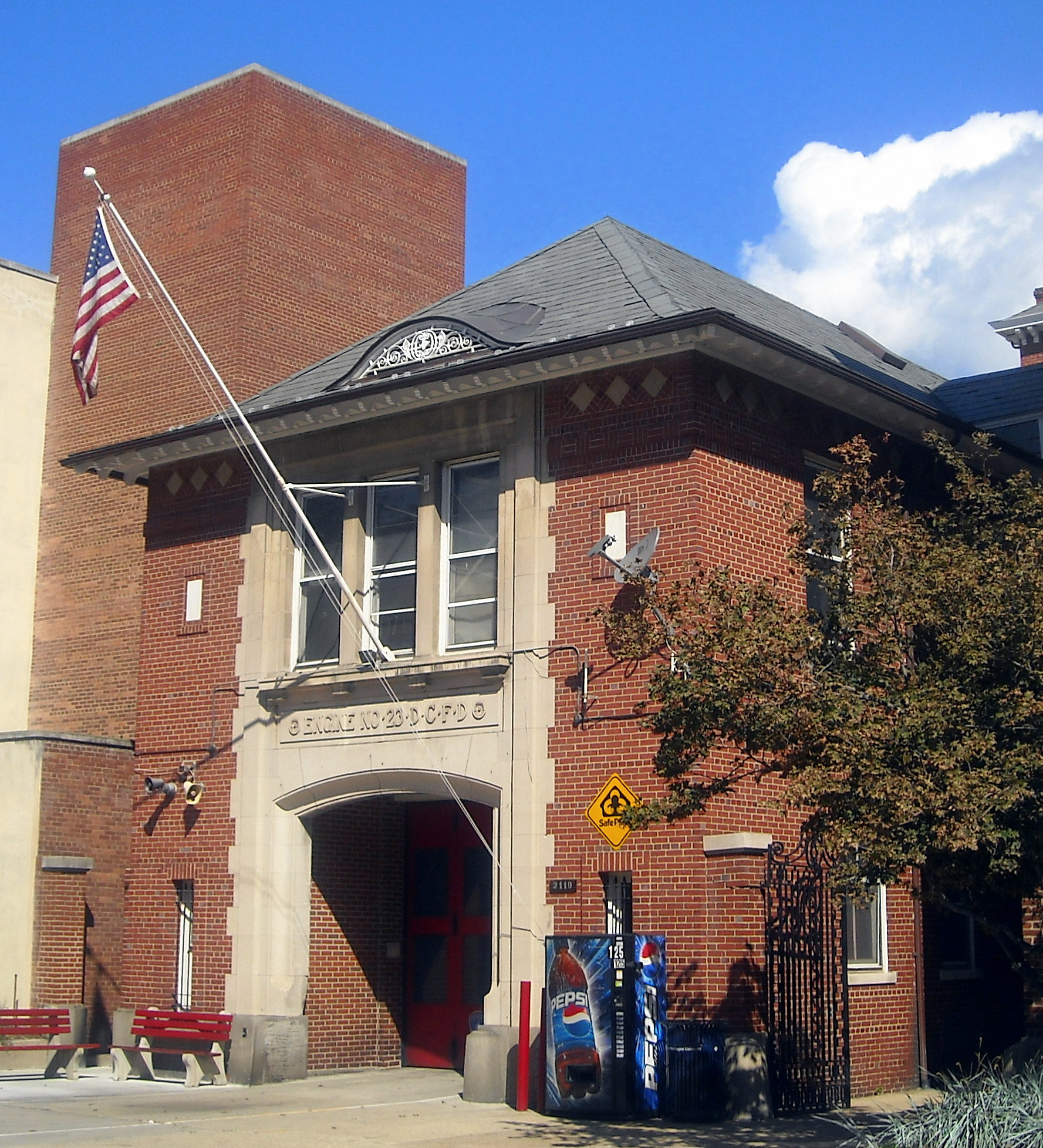
DCFD Engine Company #23 (Foggy Bottom Firehouse)

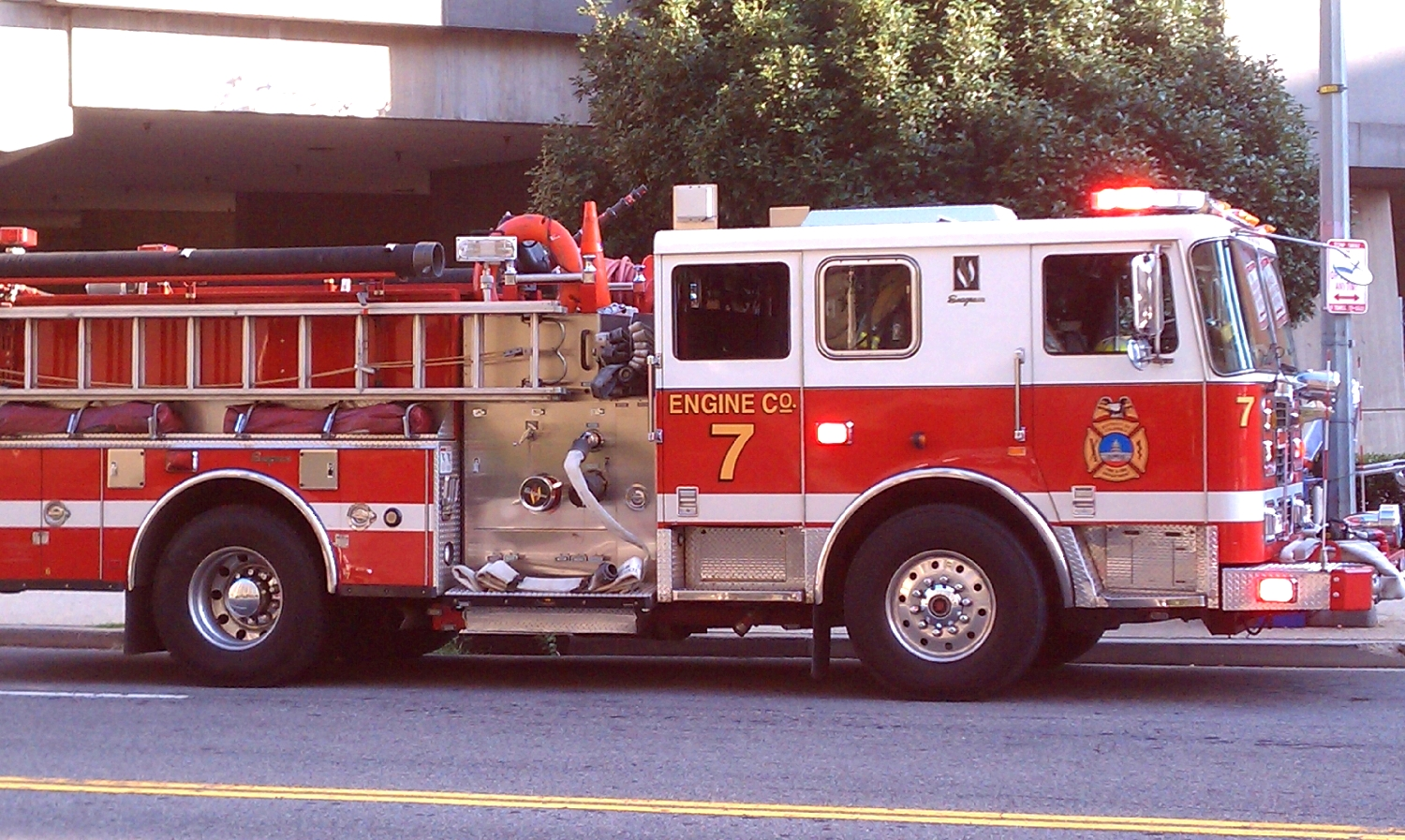
DCFD Engine 7

On January 13, 1803, District of Columbia passed its first law about fire control, requiring the owner of each building in the district to provide at least one leather firefighting bucket per story or pay a $1 fine per missing bucket.

The first firefighting organizations in the district were private volunteer companies. To end the problems created by rivalries between these companies, District of Columbia approved in 1864 an act to consolidate them and organize a paid fire department. Seven years passed before it was implemented on September 23, 1871, creating the all-professional District of Columbia Fire Department (DCFD) with a combination of paid and volunteer staff. The department had seven paid firefighters and 13 call men to answer alarms, manning three engines and two ladders.

By 1900, the DCFD had grown to 14 engine companies, four ladder companies, and two chemical companies.

In 1968, the entire DCFD was mobilized during the riots that followed the assassination of Martin Luther King Jr. The four days of disorder saw widespread civil unrest, looting and arson, which ultimately required help with 70 outside companies to battle over 500 fires and perform 120 rescues.

In the 1970s and 1980s, the department was rife with racial tension, as the nearly all-white department became much more racially integrated and African Americans sought upper-level supervisory and management positions.

=== September 11, 2001 Pentagon Attack ===
During the September 11 Attacks, an aircraft was flown into the west side of the Pentagon in Arlington County, Virginia. While the Arlington County Fire Department had primary jurisdiction for the response and aftermath of the attack, DCFD units responded to the Pentagon to provide mutual aid. At approximately 09:46 AM EST, the Fire Communications center dispatched several units to the White House for a reported plane crash into the structure. After an investigation, this alleged White House attack was unfounded. At approximately 09:48 AM EST, the Fire Communications Center sent several more units to the Pentagon to assist Arlington County Fire Department. In the end, DCFD sent over 40 units (fire suppression, ambulances, and other specialized fire vehicles) to assist with the Pentagon response, and countless more personnel over the course of several days to assist with the aftermath and cleanup of the site.

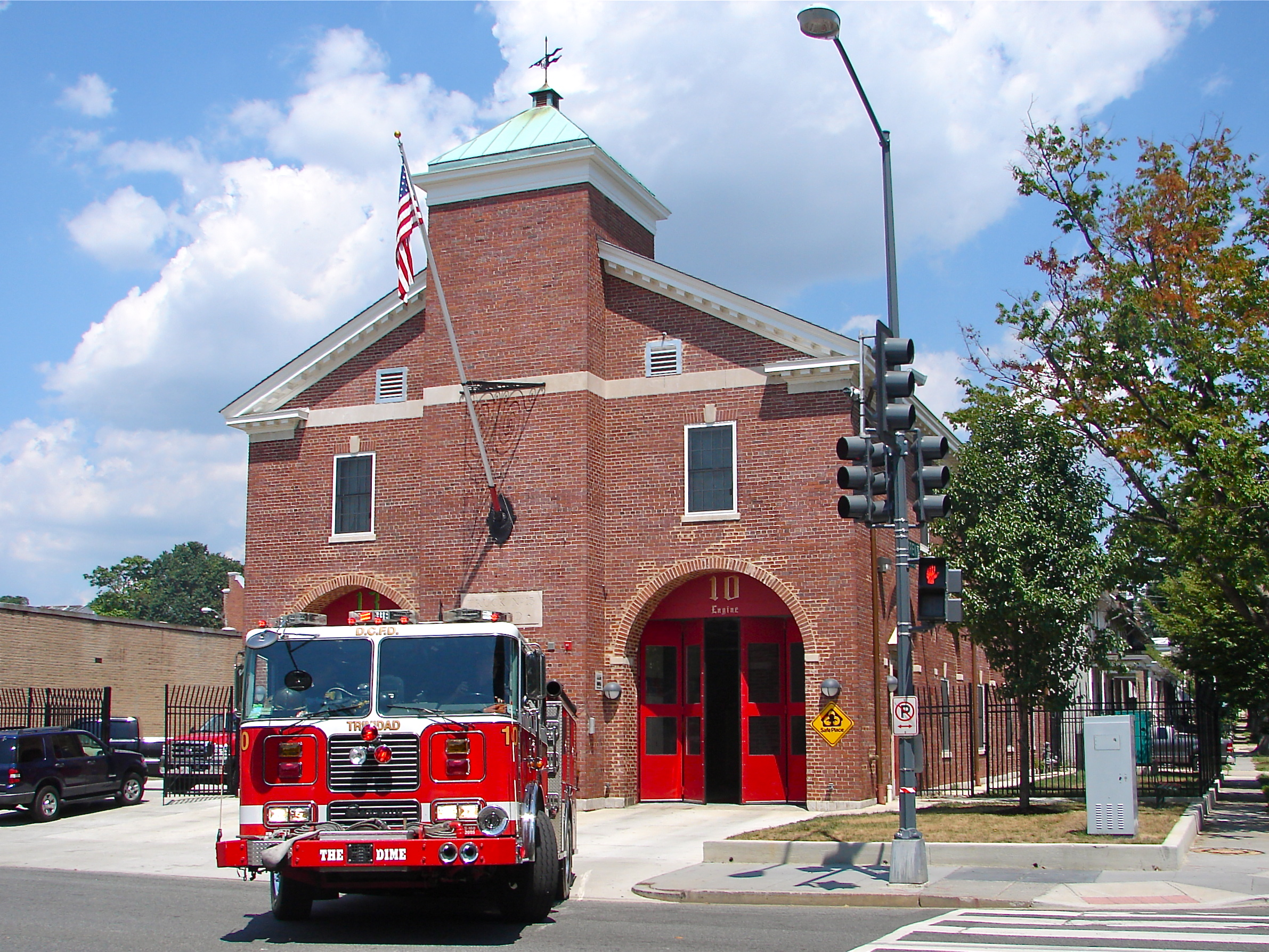
Engine 10 and Truck 13's quarters in Trinidad.

=== 2010s Budget and Maintenance Problems ===
In January 2010, The Washington Examiner reported that, in a major management failure, the agency failed to budget for seniority pay in its fiscal 2010 budget, causing a $2 million shortfall. After a hiring freeze left 130 positions unfilled, the department was projected to spend $15.4 million in fiscal 2010 (2.5 times the budgeted amount). More than 75 percent of the agency's budget goes to salaries and fringe benefits.

Problems with vehicle maintenance also worsened after 2010. The department lost track of the location of reserve vehicles, and sometimes listed fire engines as available for duty when they had been stripped for parts and sent to the junkyard. In 2012, the agency hired a consultant at a cost of $182,000 to create an accurate database of vehicle status and location. Both the D.C. Council and the District of Columbia's inspector general have strongly criticized the department's record. The District of Columbia Firefighters Association, Local 36, and the International Association of Firefighters (IAFF) have argued that the problem lies with poor management, while DCFEMS has said the problems either cannot be accounted for or are the result of rank-and-file incompetence or neglect.

In July 2013, more than 60 DCFEMS ambulances were out of commission due to maintenance issues, and the department was forced to hire a private ambulance service to provide staffing at a Major League Baseball game. On August 8, 2013, a DCFEMS ambulance ran out of fuel while part of President Barack Obama's motorcade, and ended up stranded on the South Lawn of the White House (EMS personnel said they reported a broken fuel gauge months ago, while DCFEMS said workers failed to fill the vehicle with gasoline.) On August 13, 2013, two DCFEMS ambulances caught fire—one while delivering a patient to MedStar Washington Hospital Center, the other while responding to an emergency call at an apartment building on Benning Road SE (another ambulance was dispatched to take the patient to the hospital.)

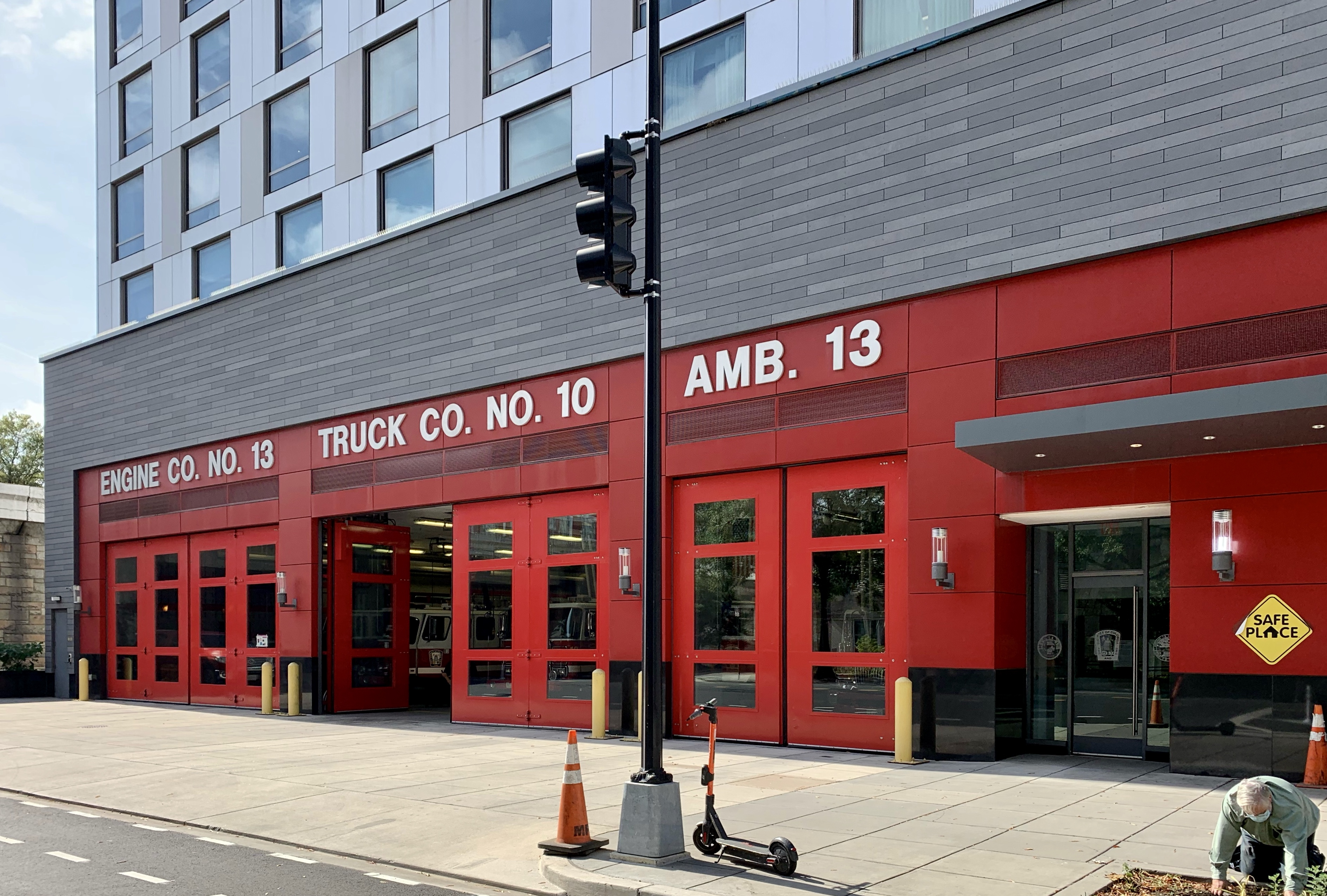
Firehouse 13 in L'Enfant Plaza

=== Mayor Muriel Bowser and Chief Gregory Dean ===
Muriel E. Bowser was sworn in as the seventh Mayor of the District of Columbia on January 2, 2015. On March 2, 2015, Mayor Bowser named Gregory Dean as Chief of the District of Columbia Fire and Emergency Medical Services Department. Dean previously served for 10 years as the Fire EMS Chief for Seattle, Washington.

Chief Dean's primary focus would be stabilizing emergency medical services, boosting the department’s understaffed ranks, addressing the increasing call volume, improving training for patient care, improving vehicle fleet reliability and improving operational safety.

In June 2015, Dr. Jullette M. Saussy was selected to serve as the Medical Director of DC Fire and EMS. On January 29, 2016, just months after her appointment, she announced her resignation from that position in a letter to Mayor Muriel Bowser. In her letter, she called the department's culture "highly toxic to the delivery of any semblance of quality pre-hospital medical care."

Dr. Robert P. Holman was appointed as the Interim Medical Director effective on February 16, 2016. Dr. Holman would ultimately be retained as the permanent Medical Director and is currently the Department’s longest-serving Medical Director.

Chief Dean communicated his vision, the Department's progress and it's challenges to the community in a letter published in the Washington Post on February 19, 2016 - A changing D.C. Fire and EMS Department will make the city safer.

Starting in March 2016, the Fire and Emergency Medical Services Department (FEMS) began using American Medical Response (AMR), now renamed Global Medical Response (GMR), to supplement patient transport services. AMR-GMR provides BLS patient transport services upon request from FEMS first responders.

Dr. Holman immediately went to work on improving EMS training, improving and expanding the EMS Continuous Quality Improvement (CQI) Office, and led the transition to criteria-based dispatching.

Dr. Holman would go on to establish the nation's largest 911 Nurse Triage Line (NTL), institute quarterly paramedic training symposiums, re-organize and reestablish the Department's Public Health / Street Calls Mobile Integrated Health Team, and improve the Department's Controlled Medication Program.

Dr. Holman was also responsible for the co-development of DC's Sobering and Stabilization Center which opened for operation in October 2023.

Most recently, in April 2024, the Department implemented a program to provide whole blood transfusions in the field. This program was implemented with support of the American Red Cross and the George Washington University Hospital’s blood bank. DC Fire and EMS is using “universal: low-titer type-O whole blood when it transfuses eligible patients suffering from hemorrhagic shock. Transfusion of patients by DC Fire and EMS increases the chance of surviving a devastating blood loss injury - more than doubling the odds of surviving and making it home from the hospital.

=== January 6 United States Capitol Attack ===
On January 6, 2021, supporters of then-U.S. president Donald Trump, attacked the United States Capitol, after his defeat in the 2020 presidential election. DCFD had a significant response to the attack, treating hundreds of people for injuries, both police officers and rioters. DCFD also had a role in the high-profile EMS response to the shooting of rioter Ashli Babbitt by a United States Capitol Police officer. This response was deemed somewhat unsafe for DCFD personnel by many working in the fire department as many responders were treated in a hostile manner by rioters.

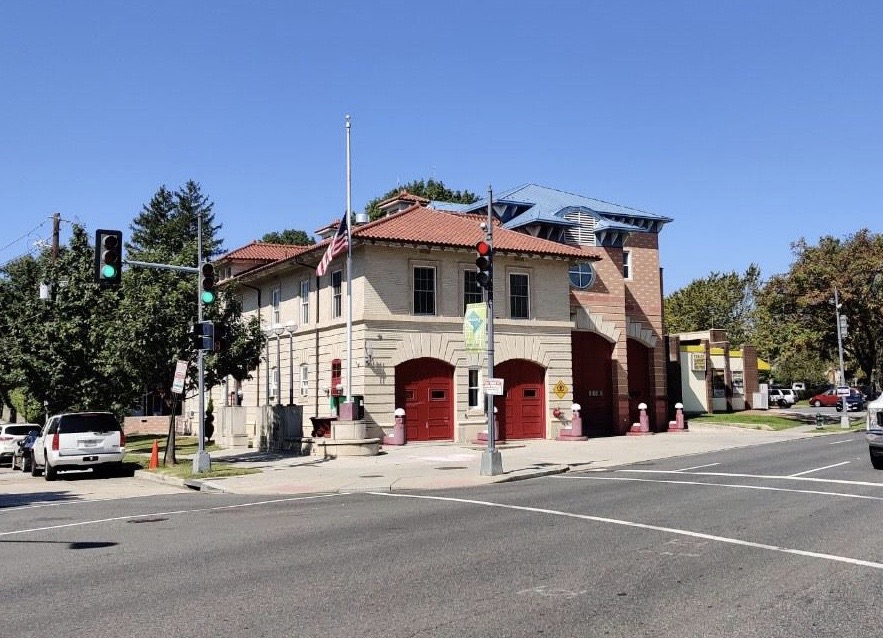
Engine 20 and Truck 12's quarters in Tenleytown

== Stations and Apparatus ==
These are the DCFD's stations and equipment.

Firehouse Number	Neighborhood	Engine Company	Truck Company	Rescue Squad Company	Ambulance or Medic Unit	Specialized Unit	Command Unit	Battalion
1	West End	E01	T02		M01; A01; A66	TAU2		Battalion 6
2	Chinatown	E02		R1	M02	MCU; CSU6	BC6; EMS6	Battalion 6
3	Columbia	PE03			M03; A03			Battalion 6
4	Pleasant Plains	E04			A04	AR1; MD1; CSU4	BCSO; SAFBC; EMS7	Battalion 4
5	Georgetown	E05			M05	CT1; RB		Battalion 5
6	Shaw	E06	T04		A06; A61	CSU1		Battalion 1
7	Navy Yard	PE07			M07			Battalion 2
8	Lincoln Park	PE08			M08; A08	AR2; MD2	BC2; EMS2	Battalion 2
9	U Street	PE09	T09		M09			Battalion 4
10	Trinidad	PE10	T13		M10			Battalion 1
11	Columbia Heights	PE11	T06		A11		BC4; EMS4	Battalion 4
12	Edgewood	E12			M12	G1; HM1; HM2; HMSU	BC1; EMS1	Battalion 1
13	L'Enfant Plaza	PE13	T10		A13	F1; F2; TAU1		Battalion 6
14	Fort Totten	E14			M14; A14			Battalion 1
15	Anacostia	PE15		R3	A15	CI; CISU; CSU3	BC3; EMS3	Battalion 3
16	Franklin Park	PE16	TW3		A16	COMM1	DFCOP; BCEMS	Battalion 6
17	Brookland	E17			M17			Battalion 1
18	Capitol Hill	PE18	T07		A18			Battalion 2
19	Randle Highlands	PE19			M19; A19; A63			Battalion 3
20	Tenleytown	PE20	T12		A20		BC5; EMS5	Battalion 5
21	Adams Morgan	E21			M21	BX1		Battalion 5
22	Brightwood	PE22	T11		A22; A64			Battalion 4
23	Foggy Bottom	E23			A23			Battalion 6
24	Petworth	E24		R2	M24	MAB1; MAB2; TR1; WRECKER	FM	Battalion 4
25	Congress Heights	PE25			M25; A25	MD3		Battalion 3
26	Brentwood	PE26	T15		A26			Battalion 1
27	Deanwood	PE27			M27; A27; A62			Battalion 2
28	Cleveland Park	E28	T14		A28			Battalion 5
29	Palisades	PE29	T05		A29	G2		Battalion 5
30	Capitol View	PE30	T17		M30; A30; A30B			Battalion 2
31	Chevy Chase	PE31			M31; A65	CT2; CSU5		Battalion 5
32	Garfield Heights	PE32	T16		A32			Battalion 3
33	Highlands	PE33	T08		M33; A33	MAB3		Battalion 3
Marine Fire and Rescue Station	Southwest Waterfront				FBT1; FB2; FB3; FB4			
Training Academy	The School	E34; E35; E36; E37	T34; T35		A34		BC8; BC9 (Emergency Mobilization)	Battalion 8 Battalion 9

Abbreviations:

- Ambulance - A
- American Medical Response - AMR
- Air - AR
- Brush - BX
- Boat - FB
- Battalion Chief - BC
- Battalion Chief of EMS - BCEMS
- Battalion Chief of Special Operations - BCSO
- Cave-In (Collapse) Unit - CI
- Cave-In Support Unit - CISU
- Canteen - CT
- Communications - COMM
- Community Support - CSU
- Deputy Fire Chief of Operations - DFCOP
- Engine - E
- EMS Supervisor - EMS
- Fire Marshal Investigations Unit - FM
- Foam - F
- Gator - G
- Hazmat - HM
- Hazmat Support Unit - HMSU
- Heavy Rescue Wrecker - WRECKER
- Medic - M
- Medical Ambulance Bus - MAB
- Mass Casualty Support- MCS
- Mobile Command Unit - MCU
- Mass Decontamination - MD
- Paramedic Engine-PE
- Rehab - RB
- Rescue - R
- Safety Battalion Chief - SAFBC
- Truck - T
- Tower - TW
- Twin Agent Unit - TAU
- Tunnel Rescue - TR

== See also ==
- Government of the District of Columbia
- Fireboat John H. Glenn Jr.
- Benjamin C. Grenup Monument built to honor the first D.C. firefighter killed in action
