= Fireboats of Washington DC =

Largest Fire Boat

Washington DC has maintained a fleet of fireboats since 1905. Its largest fireboat is the John Glenn.

The city's first two fireboats were both named "Firefighter". The first Firefighter served from 1905, until 1948. The second Firefighter served from 1948, until 1978.

In 1978 Washington acquired the John Glenn, formerly operated by the Fire Department of New York.

The Fire Department does not name its smaller fireboats, they are, instead, numbered. As of 15 September 2017 Fireboat 3 its most recent fireboat, is 29 feet (8.8 m) long. The city expects a new Fireboat 2 in late September 2017.

In September, 2017, Fireboat 3 sank at her moorings, due to a hidden leak.
