= Fire Station No. 22 =

Fire Station No. 22, and variations such as Engine House No. 22, may refer to:

- Fire Station No. 22 (Birmingham, Alabama)
- Steam Engine Company No. 22, Louisville, Kentucky
- Engine Company 22, Washington, D.C.

== See also ==
- List of fire stations
