= Raleigh Hotel (Washington, D.C.) =

Historic hotel built 1893, demolished 1964

The Raleigh Hotel
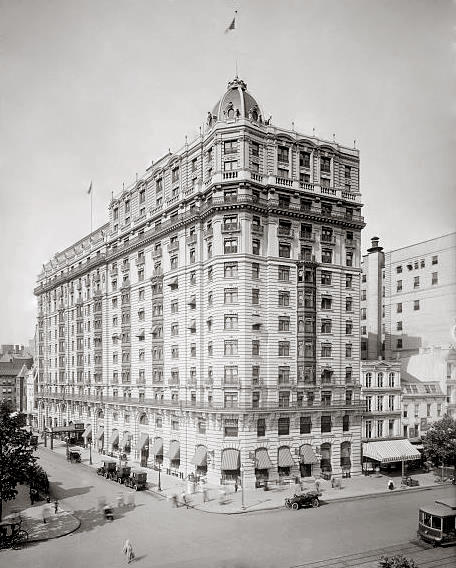

- Location within Central Washington, D.C.

General information
- Type: Office
- Location: Washington, D.C., United States
- Coordinates: 38.895304°N 77.027684°W
- Completed: 1893
- Demolished: 1964

Height
- Roof: 160 feet (49 m)

Design and construction
- Architects: Leon E. Dessez; Henry Janeway Hardenbergh

The Raleigh Hotel (built as the Shepherd Centennial Building) was a historic high-rise office and then hotel building in downtown Washington, D.C., United States. It stood on the northeast corner of 12th Street NW and Pennsylvania Avenue.

== History ==
The site, on the northeast corner of 12th Street N.W., and Pennsylvania Avenue, was originally occupied by the Fountain Inn, erected in 1815 after the burning of Washington. This structure was razed and in 1847 the four-story Fuller Hotel opened. Renamed the Kirkwood House, it was the residence of Vice President Andrew Johnson; he took the oath of office of the president of the United States there in April 1865 after the assassination of President Abraham Lincoln. Kirkwood House was razed in 1875.

It was replaced with the Shepherd Centennial Building, a seven-story office building in the Second Empire style that opened in 1876. The upper floors were rented by the Pension Office until 1885, as they apparently had to use multiple private office buildings until their new Pension Bureau building was ready. The ground floor on the Pennsylvania Avenue side was rented by the Palais Royal department store from 1877 until 1893, when the building was converted into the Raleigh Hotel under architect Leon E. Dessez.

In 1911, the building was razed and rebuilt by architect Henry Janeway Hardenbergh as a 13-story Beaux Arts hotel with a rusticated brick, white limestone, and terra cotta exterior. Congress changed the height limit for buildings on Pennsylvania Avenue NW from 130 feet (40 m) to 160 feet (49 m) in 1910 in order to accommodate the Raleigh Hotel. In 1936, there was a major interior renovation. Curt Schliffeler managed the hotel from 1936 to 1954. In 1964, the Raleigh was demolished.

The site is now occupied by 1111 Pennsylvania Avenue, an office building.

== See also ==
- List of tallest buildings in Washington, D.C.
