= Engine House No. 10 (Washington, D.C.) =

- U.S. National Register of Historic Places
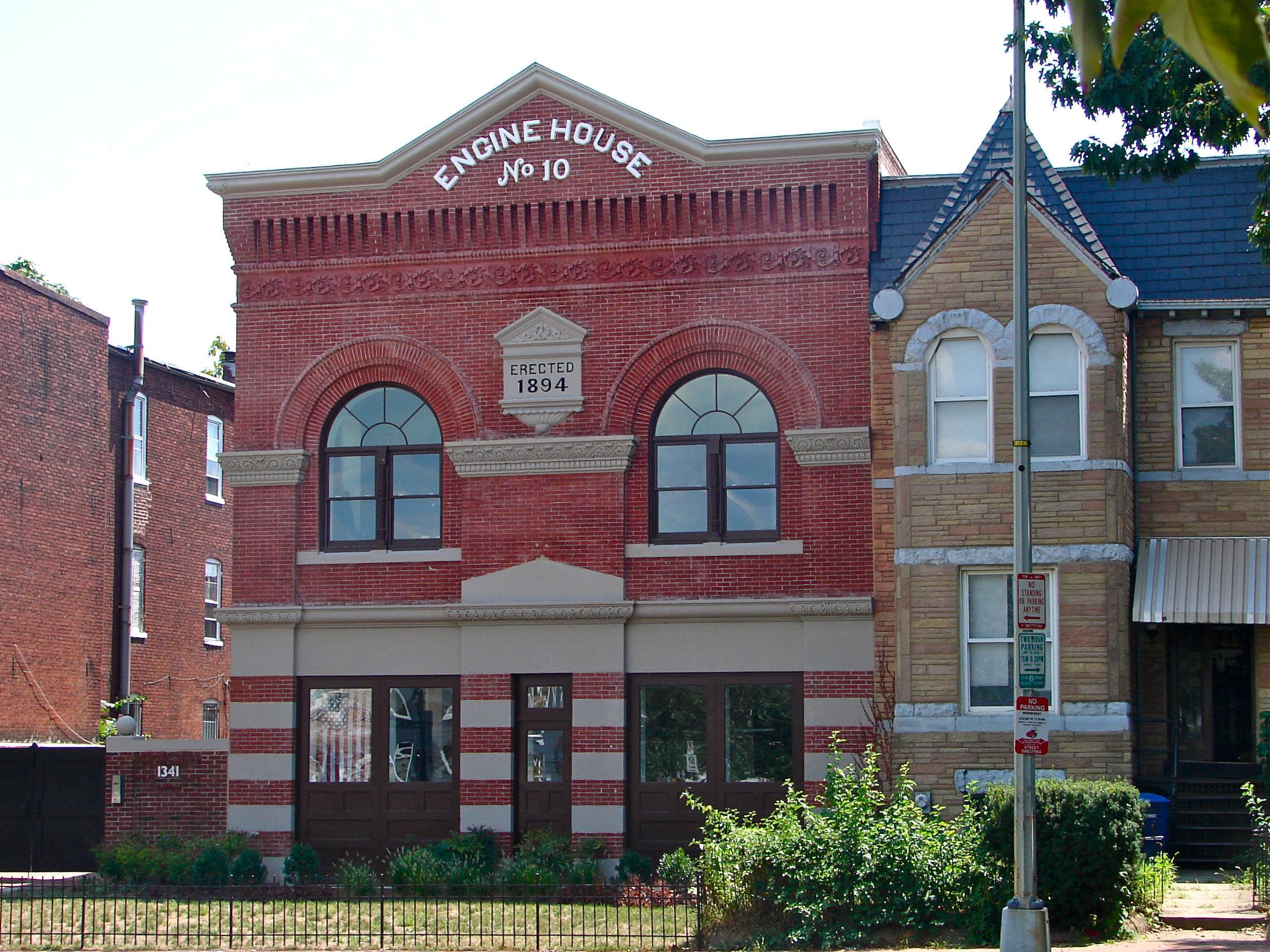
- Engine House No. 10 (2011)

- Location within District of Columbia
- Location: 1341 Maryland Ave., NE., Washington, D.C.
- Coordinates: 38°53′54″N 76°59′13″W
- Area: less than one acre
- Built: 1895
- Architect: Leon E. Dessez
- Architectural style: Queen Anne
- MPS: Firehouses in Washington DC MPS
- NRHP reference No.: 08001063
- Added to NRHP: November 19, 2008

Engine House No. 10 is a historic firehouse located at 1341 Maryland Ave., NE., Washington, D.C., in the Stanton Park neighborhood, just north of Capitol Hill.

== History ==
It was built in 1894–95. It was listed on the National Register of Historic Places in 2008.

The firehouse is one of eight designed by Leon E. Dessez in Washington.

Engine Company 10 was formed on July 2, 1895, at this firehouse and was equipped with an 1884 Clapp & Jones 450 GPM steam fire engine and an 1895 McDermott Bros. hose reel carriage. In 1940 it moved to a firehouse on Florida Avenue.
