= Truck Company F =

- U.S. National Register of Historic Places
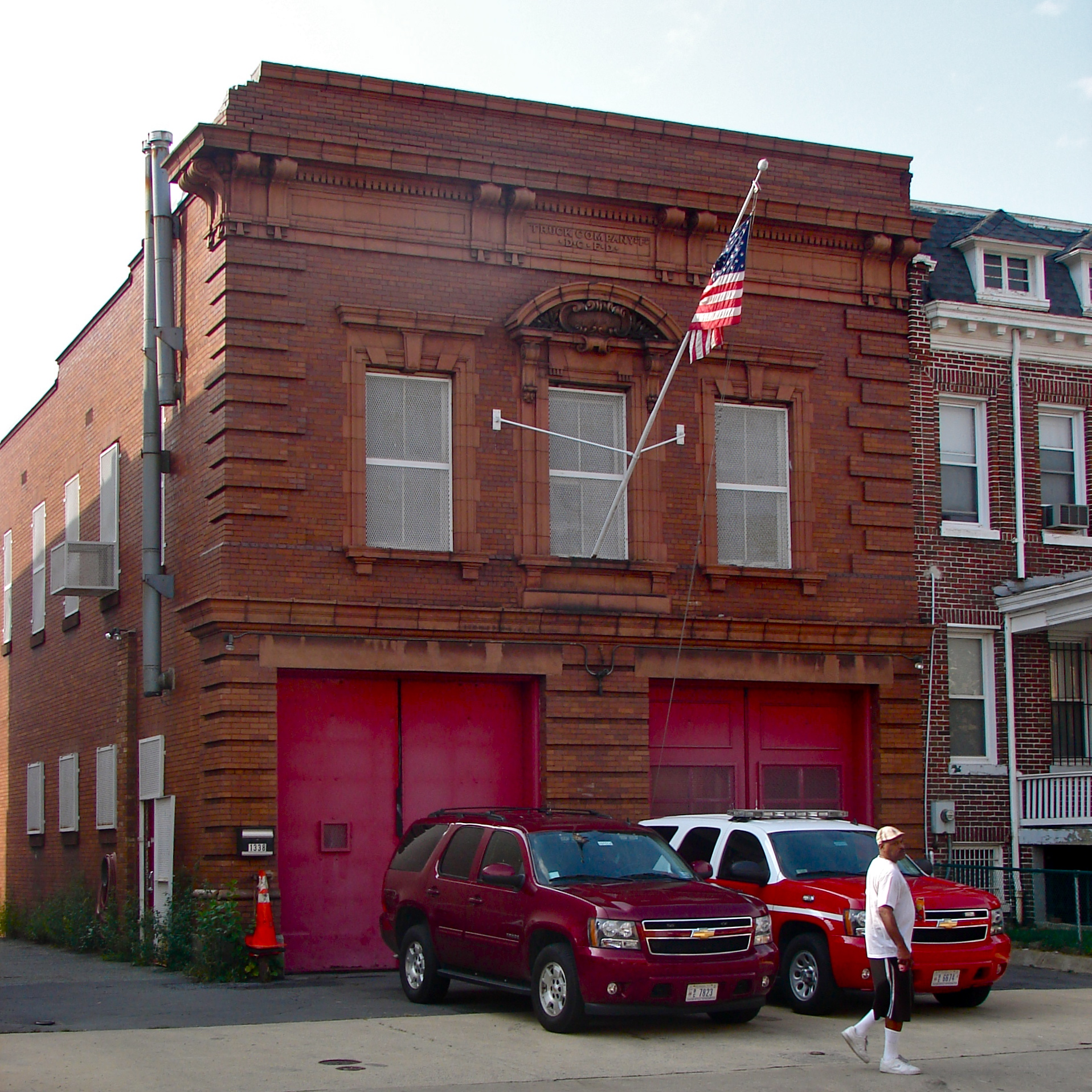

- Location within District of Columbia
- Location: 1336-1338 Park Rd. NW, Washington, District of Columbia
- Coordinates: 38°55′49″N 77°01′54″W
- Area: less than one acre
- Built: 1900
- Architect: Leon E. Dessez
- Architectural style: Renaissance
- MPS: Firehouses in Washington DC MPS
- NRHP reference No.: 07000539
- Added to NRHP: June 6, 2007

Truck Company F, at 1336-1338 Park Rd. NW in Washington, D.C., was built in 1900. It was listed on the National Register of Historic Places in 2007. The listing included two contributing buildings.

It was designed by architect Leon E. Dessez in the Renaissance style.

It has also been known as Truck Company 6, Old Engine Company 11, and the Old Columbia Heights Firehouse.

It was designated a historic landmark in Washington, D.C., on July 22, 2004. According to the DC Office of Planning,

Truck Company F was built in 1900 to serve the emerging neighborhood of Columbia Heights. It was one of the first of a new series of high-style firehouses created in the eclectic period between the late 1890s and World War I, as an expression of civic pride and as a testament to the importance of the Fire Department. The superb Italian Renaissance Revival design by local architect Leon Dessez is executed with a high degree of finish and formality, using Roman brick and glazed terra cotta detailing. The rear stable, similar in design, also remains. The firehouse was built for Truck Company F (whose designation is inscribed in the terra cotta frieze), it was renamed Truck Company 6 in 1906, and merged with Engine Company 11 in 1940. The building was decommissioned when Engine Company 11 relocated in 1982.
