= Jullette M. Saussy =

Jullette M. Saussy is a medical doctor and the former head of emergency medical services for New Orleans, Louisiana, and Washington, D.C.

Saussy started in emergency medical services in 1984 as an emergency medical technician and received her paramedic training in 1986 from the University of South Alabama. After graduating from Tulane University, she worked as a paramedic for the New Orleans Health Department EMS Service on the night shift. Later, she graduated from medical school at Louisiana State University Health Sciences Center New Orleans. Saussy performed her internship and residency at Charity Hospital (New Orleans).

In 2004, Saussy became was the director and medical director of New Orleans Emergency Medical Services in New Orleans, and directed operations when Hurricane Katrina flooded the city the following year. She resigned on October 1, 2010.

In June 2015, Saussy was named the medical director of the District of Columbia Fire and Emergency Medical Services Department in Washington, D.C. On January 29, 2016, she announced her resignation from that position in a letter to Mayor Muriel Bowser. In her letter, she called the culture of the DC Fire and EMS Department "highly toxic to the delivery of any semblance of quality pre-hospital medical care."
