= Number One Observatory Circle =

Official residence of the vice president of the United States

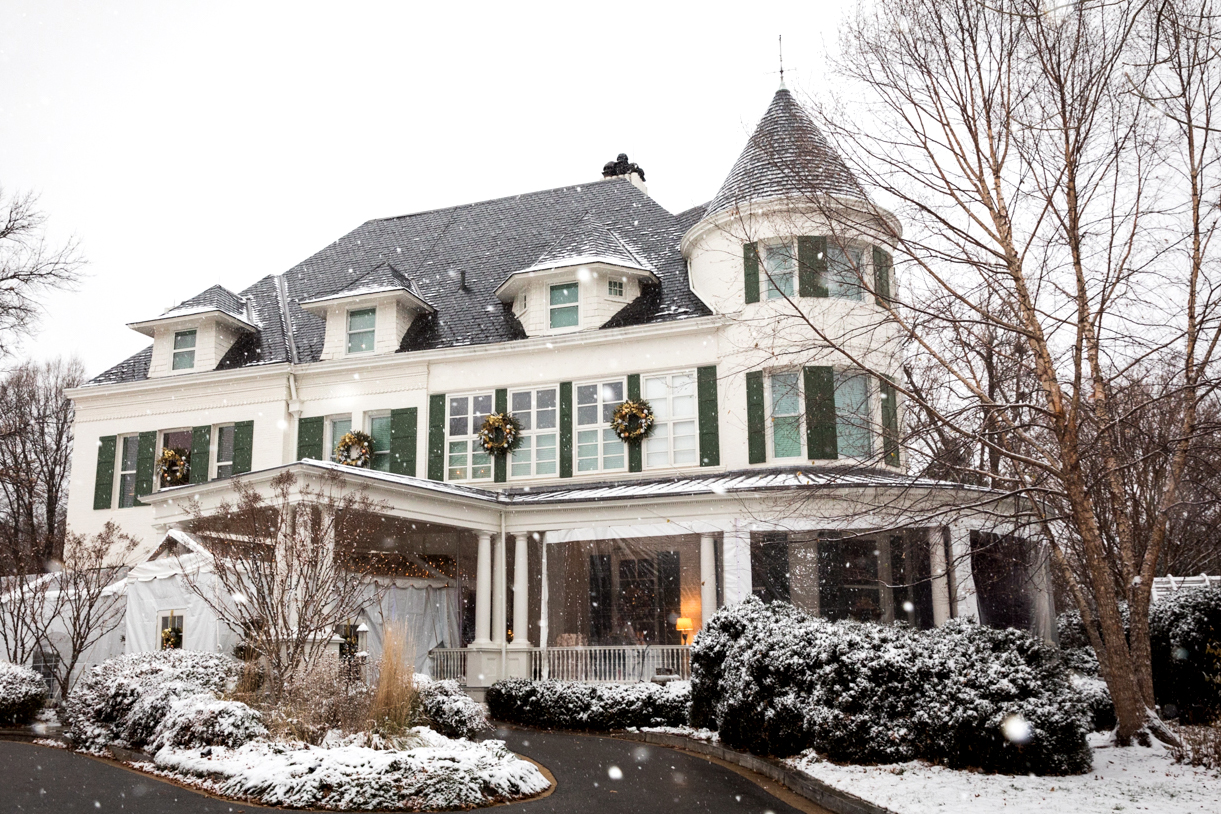
- The Vice President's Residence in 2017
- Interactive map of the Number One Observatory Circle area
- Alternative names: The Vice President's Residence

General information
- Architectural style: Queen Anne
- Location: 1 Observatory Circle NW, U.S. Naval Observatory, Washington, D.C. 20008-3619, U.S.
- Coordinates: 38°55′23″N 77°03′56″W
- Current tenants: JD Vance, Vice President of the United States and the Second Family
- Completed: 1893

Technical details
- Size: 33 rooms

Design and construction
- Architect: Leon E. Dessez

Number One Observatory Circle is the official residence of the vice president of the United States. Located on the grounds of the U.S. Naval Observatory in Washington, D.C., it is sometimes informally referred to simply as "the Naval Observatory". The house was built in 1893 for the observatory's superintendent. The U.S. Navy's chief of naval operations (CNO) liked the house so much that in 1923 he took over the house from the superintendent for himself. It remained the residence of the CNO until 1974, when Congress determined that it would be easier and less expensive to provide security in a government-provided residence, and authorized its transformation to the first official residence for the vice president, though a temporary one. It is still the "official temporary residence of the vice president of the United States" by law. The 1974 congressional authorization covered the cost of refurbishment and furnishing the house.

Although Number One Observatory Circle was made available to the vice president in 1974, more than two years passed before a vice president lived full-time in the house. Vice President Gerald Ford became president after Richard Nixon gave his resignation speech before he could use the house. His vice president, Nelson Rockefeller, primarily used the home for official entertainment as he already had a well-secured residence in Washington, D.C., though the Rockefellers donated millions of dollars' worth of furnishings to the house. Walter Mondale was the first vice president to move into the house. Every vice president since has lived there.

== History ==
=== Early history ===
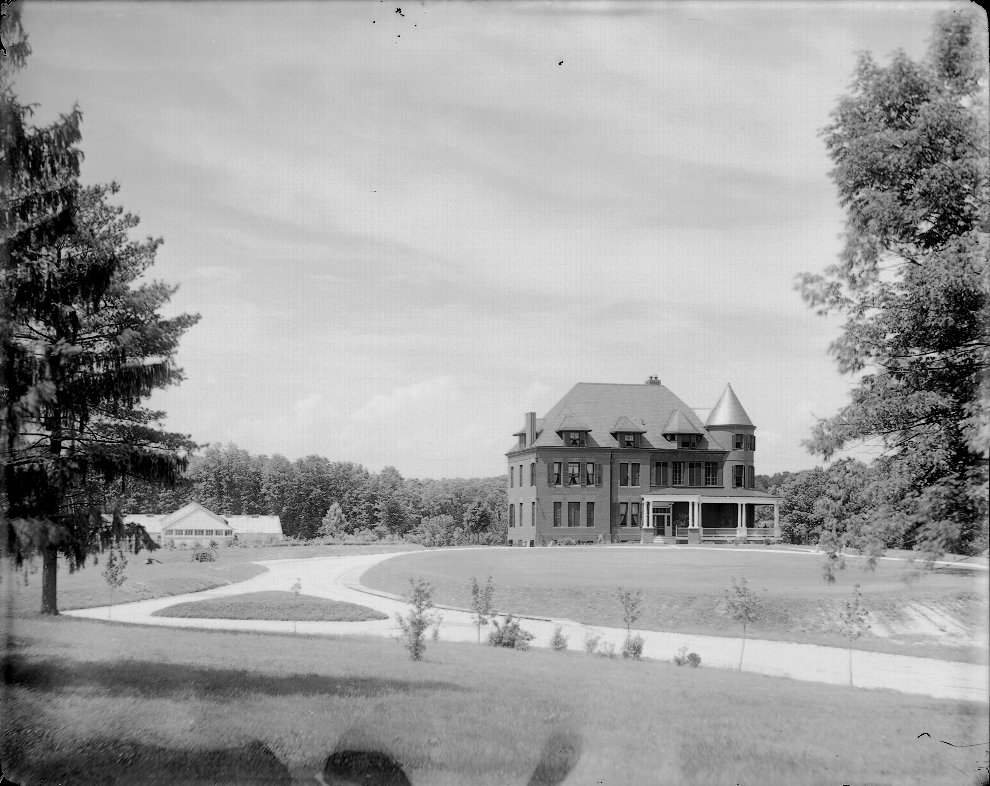
The Queen Anne style house in 1895; built of terracotta brick, it was unpainted until 1960

The house at One Observatory Circle was designed by architect Leon E. Dessez and built in 1893 for $20,000 (equivalent to $716,667 in 2025) for the use of the superintendent of the Naval Observatory who was the original resident. It was built on 13 acres (5.3 ha) of land which had originally been part of a 73-acre (30 ha) farm called Northview, which the Navy purchased in 1880. Northview had been the property of widow Margaret Barber, who at the time of the abolition of slavery in the District in 1862 was one of its largest slaveholders.

The Naval Observatory is located 2.5 miles (4 km) from the White House and directly to its south is the British Embassy. The observatory was moved from Foggy Bottom to its present location the same year the house was completed and 12 observatory superintendents lived in what was then known as The Superintendent's House. In 1928, with the passage of Public Law 630, Congress appropriated it for the chief of naval operations, and in June 1929, Charles Hughes became the first resident of what became known as Admiral's House. For the next 45 years, it served as the home of admirals such as Richard Leigh, Chester Nimitz, and Elmo Zumwalt.

=== Previous vice presidential residences and legislation ===
Number One Observatory Circle
- Long title: Joint Resolution designating the premises occupied by the Chief of Naval Operations as the official residence of the Vice President, effective upon the termination of service of the incumbent Chief of Naval Operations.
- Enacted by: the 93rd United States Congress
- Effective: July 12, 1974

Citations
- Public law: Pub. L. 93–346
- Statutes at Large: 88 Stat. 340

Legislative history
- Introduced in the Senate as S.J. Res. 202 by Hugh Scott (R–PA) on April 3, 1974; Committee consideration by Senate Armed Services; Passed the Senate on May 16, 1974 (unanimous consent); Passed the House on June 12, 1974 (380–23) with amendment; Senate agreed to House amendment on June 26, 1974 (unanimous consent) with further amendment; House agreed to Senate amendment on June 28, 1974 (unanimous consent); Signed into law by President Richard Nixon on July 12, 1974

Previously, serving vice presidents had lived in hotels or their own private homes. In 1923, to honor her late husband, Senator John B. Henderson's widow offered to provide their newly built home as an official residence. President Calvin Coolidge, who lived in a hotel when he served as vice president from 1921 to 1923, wrote in his autobiography that an "official residence with suitable maintenance should be provided for the Vice-President", and that the office "should have a settled and permanent habitation and a place, irrespective of the financial ability of its temporary occupant."

After the assassination of John F. Kennedy in 1963, the new president Lyndon B. Johnson had to continue living at his private home in the Spring Valley neighborhood of northwest Washington for two weeks, until Kennedy's widow and children could move out of the White House. This provoked security concerns, and in 1964, Johnson proposed the establishment of an official vice-presidential residence in a location with high security. In addition to the Naval Observatory, Fort McNair and Blair House were considered as potential sites.

In 1966, the House Public Works Committee approved the construction of a three-story vice presidential residence at the Naval Observatory. However, it was criticized as an extravagant expense by Republican congressmen, prominently including House Minority Leader Gerald Ford, who would later become vice president and then president himself. A month later, President Johnson suspended construction until the economy improved; construction never restarted.

The exact location was to be determined later by the GAO and the Navy. Construction was to commence on the residence when funding was available once the Vietnam War was over. In the interim, the Secret Service paid for expensive upgrades to the private homes of vice presidents Hubert Humphrey, Spiro Agnew, and Gerald Ford. Agnew lived in his house for only three months in 1973 before resigning; shortly after, he sold it at a large profit, in part because of the upgrades (additional quarters for the Secret Service, fences and a new driveway for example), paid for by the government. This resulted in a minor scandal. A subsequent investigation showed that it would be cheaper to immediately set up the new vice presidential residence rather than secure private homes.

=== Rockefeller and Mondale ===
In July 1974, Congress passed a new law to make Admiral's House the "official temporary residence of the vice president of the United States" effective upon the termination of service of the incumbent chief of naval operations. Work began on preparing Admiral's House to be the temporary vice president's residence later that fall, after Richard Nixon's resignation and move of the CNO to Quarters A at the Navy Yard. The decision was largely made as it was increasingly expensive to add security and communicative equipment to each new vice presidential residence. Elmo Zumwalt was the last chief of naval operations to live in Number One Observatory Circle before it became the official residence of the vice president. For Zumwalt, not pleased with the choice, this was reason enough to challenge Virginia senator Harry F. Byrd Jr. in the 1976 Senate election.

The 1974 renovation replaced and updated building systems and increased the size of several rooms by removing internal walls. As a part of this renovation, the interior trim was painted white, and the walls had a palette of mostly neutral colors. Little consideration was given to historic preservation with interior or exterior spaces. No attempt was made to restore any interior space to its appearance at the period of construction or early use. The 1961-era white paint on the exterior was retained. Second-floor shutters, which appear in an 1895 photograph, were reinstalled.

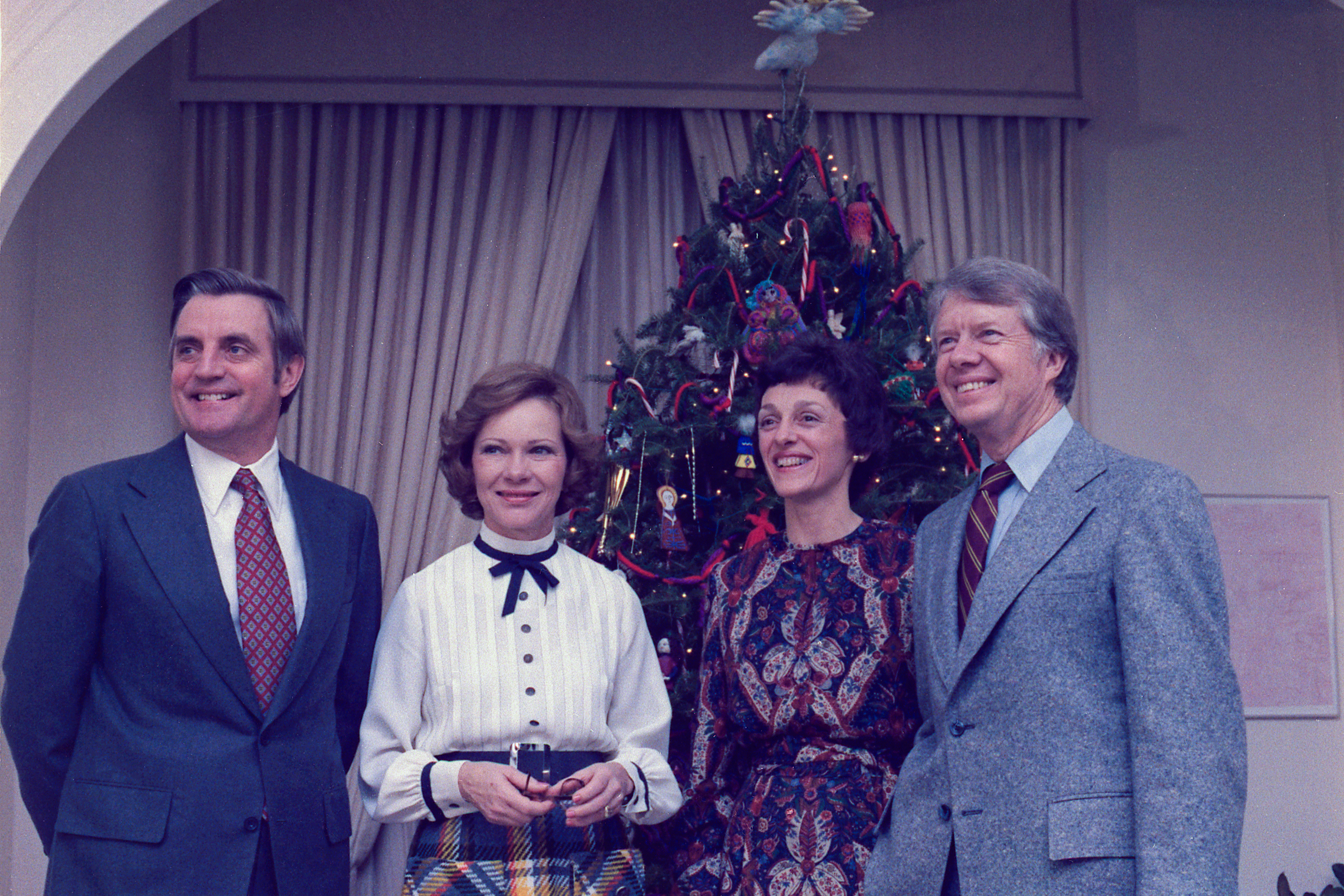
Vice President Walter Mondale and Second Lady Joan Mondale host President Jimmy Carter and First Lady Rosalynn Carter in 1977

The house formally opened as the vice presidential residence in September 1975. Vice President Gerald Ford would have been the first resident if President Richard Nixon had not resigned, leaving the White House to Ford. The new vice president Nelson Rockefeller chose to live in his larger private home instead and used Admiral's House only for entertaining. In January 1977, Walter Mondale became the first vice president to live in the house, and it has served as the home of every vice president since.

=== Later vice presidents ===
Instead of building a new vice presidential residence, One Observatory Circle continued to have extensive remodels. In 1976, the Navy spent $276,000 to replace 22 window units with steam heat and central air conditioning; the leaky roof was replaced in 1980 with slate. In 1981, George H. W. Bush and Second Lady Barbara raised $187,000 for carpeting, furniture, and upholstery when they moved in. The next year, the Navy spent $34,000 to repair the porch roof. Repairs to interior and exterior walls damaged by water seepage amounted to $225,000, and $8,000 more was spent to build a small master bedroom. Bush also constructed a horseshoe pit and quarter-mile track around the residence. During his eight years at the residence, Vice President Bush hosted over 900 parties.

Dan Quayle delayed his move-in by a month in 1989 for an extensive $300,000 remodeling that included a rebuilt third floor with bedrooms suitable for children, a wheelchair-accessible entrance, and an upgraded bathroom off the vice president's room. In 1991, a non-profit organization, the Vice President's Residence Foundation, was established to raise further funds to redecorate the residence. (Note: Then-Vice President Joe Biden showed great appreciation for Quayle's addition. In 2010, he called Quayle his "favorite vice president" due to the pool, and, after leaving the house in 2017, told the incoming Pences, "you’re gonna love the pool".) A 525-square-foot (49 m^{2}) sky-lit exercise room was added to the rooftop around that time, and numerous security enhancements were also performed.

The Navy, responsible for upkeep on the residence, decided in 1991 that Congress would never build a permanent vice president's residence (ostensibly next door to Admiral's House) and opted instead to remodel and repair the house substantially. Al Gore agreed to delay his move into the house by nearly six months in 1993 to allow for the largest renovation of the house since 1974. The $1.6 million repair job replaced the heating, air conditioning, plumbing, removed asbestos, rewired the house, replaced the ventilation systems, restored the porch, and upgraded the family quarters on the second floor. Unlike prior additions, these habitability-focused renovations were carried out with taxpayer funds. Second Lady Tipper Gore built an electronic inventory of all the official household items passed down from administration to administration.

Vice President Dick Cheney and Second Lady Lynne Cheney's changes to the residence included renovating the upstairs exercise room, redoing the kitchen pantry, and decorating the house in neutral colors.

Vice President Kamala Harris and her husband Douglas Emhoff moved into Number One Observatory on April 7, 2021. They temporarily resided at Blair House during the renovations as they agreed to move in once the $3.8 million upgrades to the residence had been completed. The repairs consisted of replacing chimney liners, heating, air-conditioning, and plumbing systems. Harris was responsible for having the kitchen remodeled and the hardwood floors refurbished. On October, 2021, Emhoff affixed a white mezuzah to the right-hand side of the doorway of the residence's wooden entryway, which marked the first time an executive home in American history has carried the abiding sign of sanctity of a Jewish home. On November 28, 2021, Harris and Emhoff became the first second couple to light a menorah in the window of the official residence in celebration of the first night of Hanukkah. On April 15, 2022, Harris and Emhoff became the first known second family to host a Passover Seder at the vice president's residence.

In 2024, Harris and Emhoff did not invite Vice President-elect JD Vance and the incoming second family to visit the home before moving in. Incoming second lady Usha Vance unsuccessfully sought information about the home from Harris's staff before communicating with Naval officials. Vance was concerned about childproofing the house to accommodate the couple's three young children, all under the age of 7, when they moved into the home in January 2025.

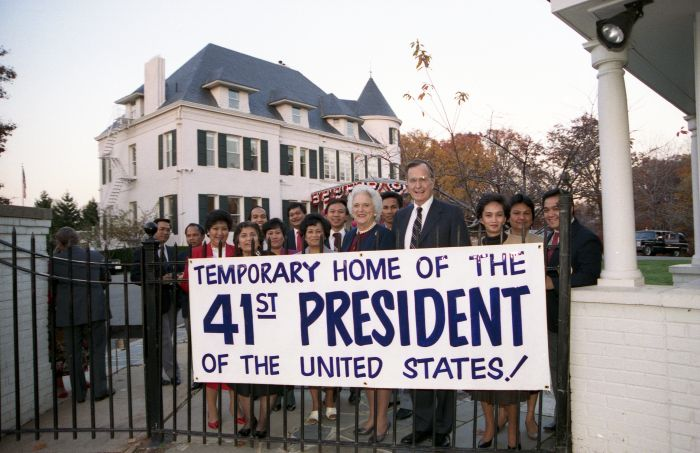
President-elect George H. W. Bush and First Lady-designate Barbara, after he was elected president on November 9, 1988

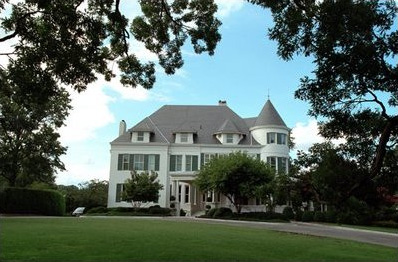
Number One Observatory Circle in 2001

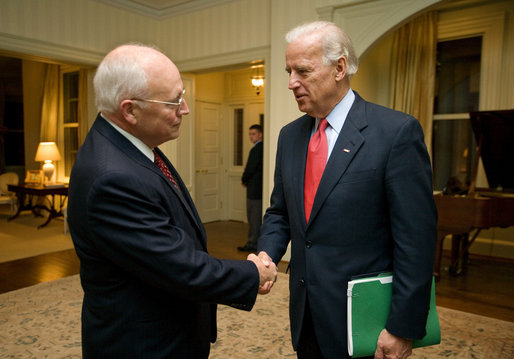
Vice President Dick Cheney meeting with Vice President-elect Joe Biden, on November 13, 2008

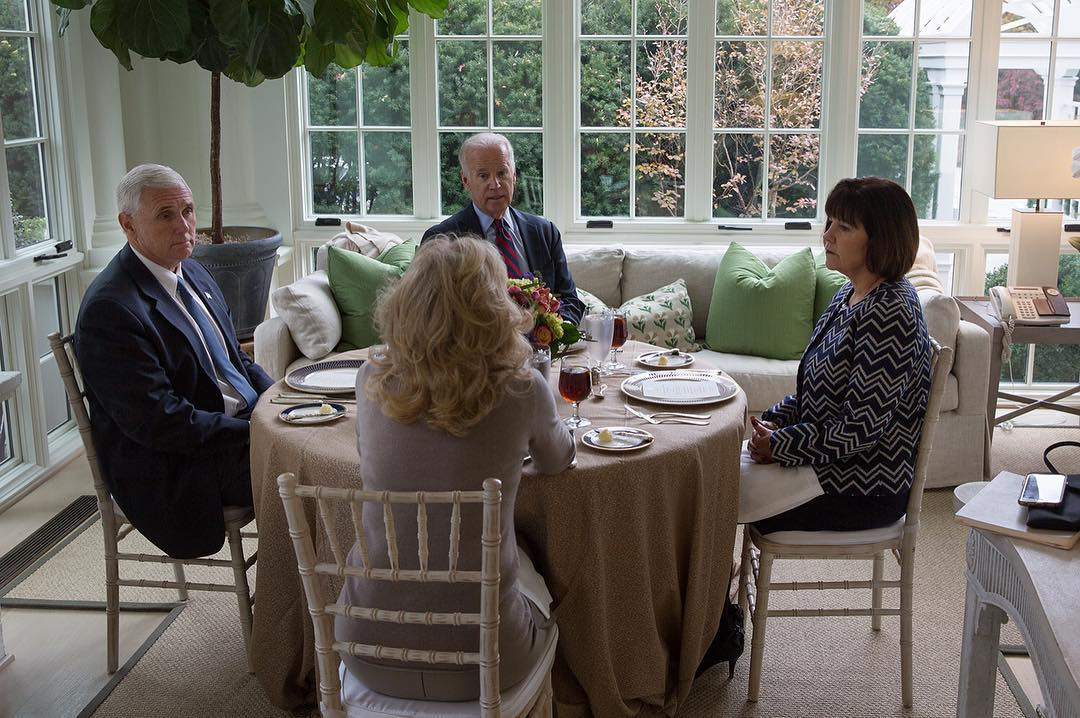
Vice President Joe Biden and Second Lady Jill meeting with Vice President-elect Mike Pence and Second Lady-designate Karen, on November 16, 2016

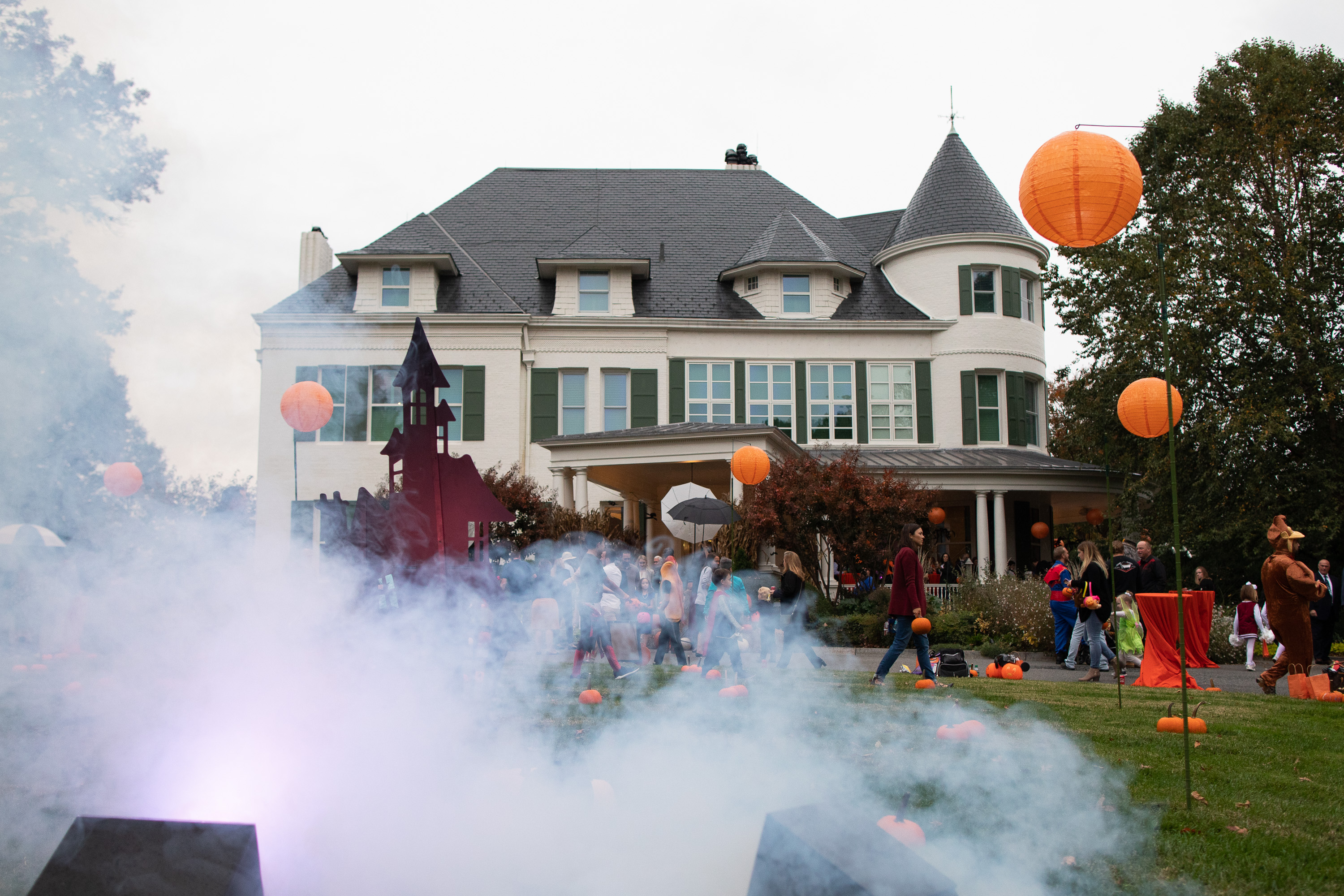
Halloween festivities during the tenure of Vice President Mike Pence in 2019

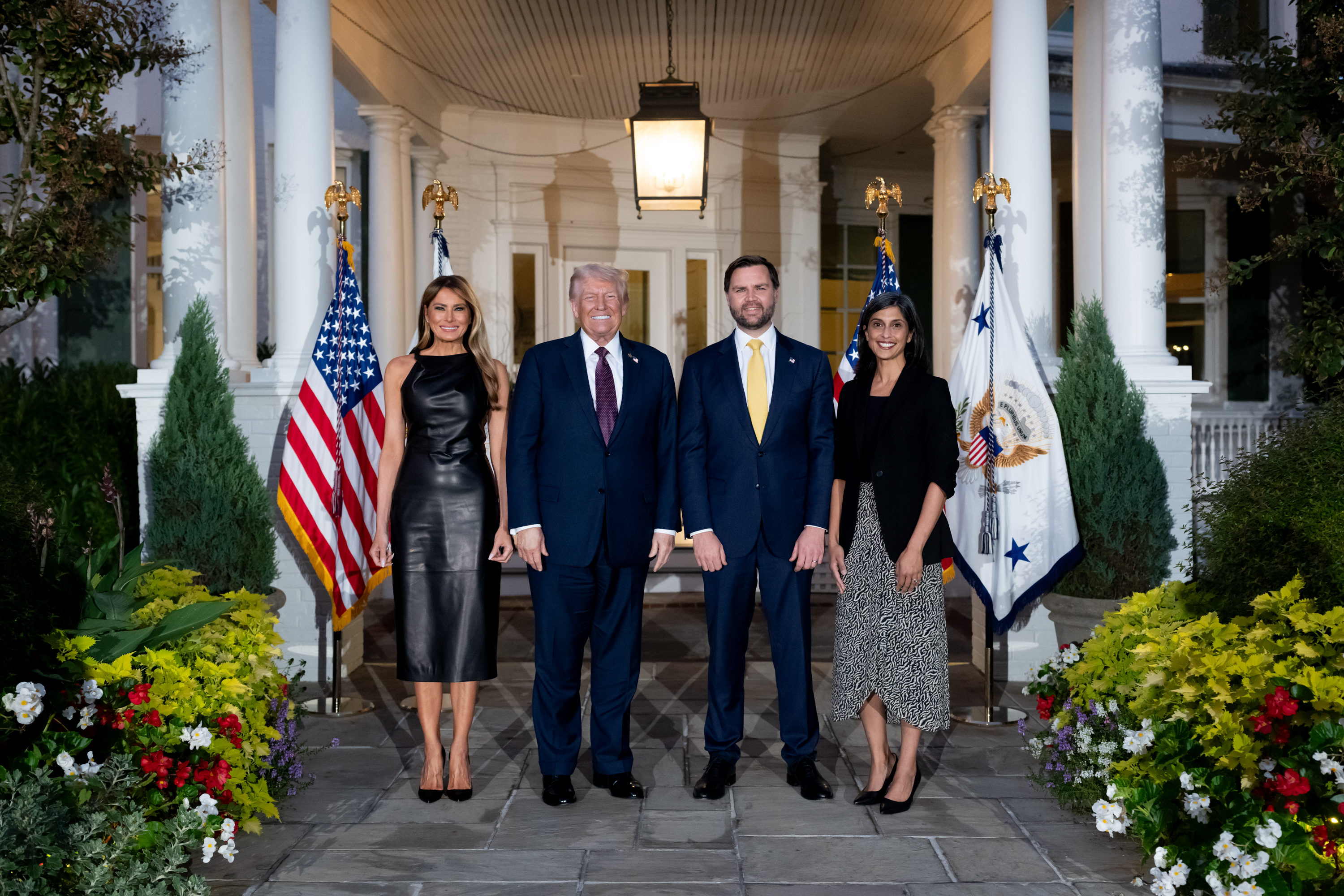
Vice President JD Vance and Second Lady Usha Vance host President Donald Trump and First Lady Melania Trump, on October 2, 2025

== Architecture and decoration ==
=== Queen Anne style ===
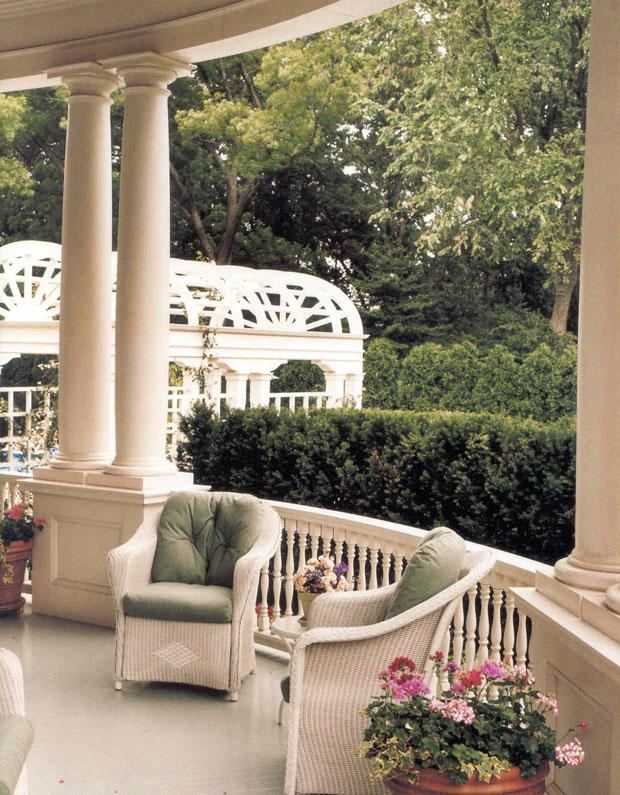
A broad porch wraps around the front of the house, photographed during the tenure of Vice President Al Gore

The house is built in the Queen Anne style prevalent in the last quarter of the nineteenth century. Hallmarks of the Queen Anne style are an asymmetrical floor plan, a series of rooms opening to each other rather than a common central hall, round turret rooms, inglenooks near fireplaces, and broad verandas wrapping the ground floor, all of which are found at Number One Observatory Circle.

When the house was constructed, its exterior was faced with terracotta brick. The wood trim was painted in a warm putty-gray, and the wooden porch in a combination of putty-gray and white. Window frames and mullions were painted the same gray, and shutters were painted olive green. The interior was furnished mostly with the personal furnishings of the Naval Observatory superintendent and later those of the chief of naval operations. Period photographs of the interior show middle-class nineteenth-century furnishings in various styles, including Eastlake. Walls were covered in patterned wall papers.

By the first decade of the twentieth century, Victorian-style architecture had begun to fall out of fashion. Many houses that were initially built in brick or wood with complex paintings were simplified and "colonialized" by being painted white. This frequently happened inside as well as outside. Substantial wood millwork of mahogany, quarter-sawn oak, American chestnut, and walnut were often painted over in white to "lighten" rooms and make them feel more contemporary. The home's exterior was originally dark red brick until 1960 when it was painted "feather" gray. It was changed to white with black shutters in 1963, and by 1993 was cream-colored.

=== Layout ===
The house is 9,000 square feet (836 m^{2}) and includes 33 rooms. The house's first floor has a dining room, garden room, living room, lounges, pantry kitchen, reception hall, sitting room, and veranda. The second floor contains the main bedroom suite, an additional bedroom, a den, and a study. The attic, once the servants' quarters, now houses four bedrooms. The main kitchen is located in the basement.

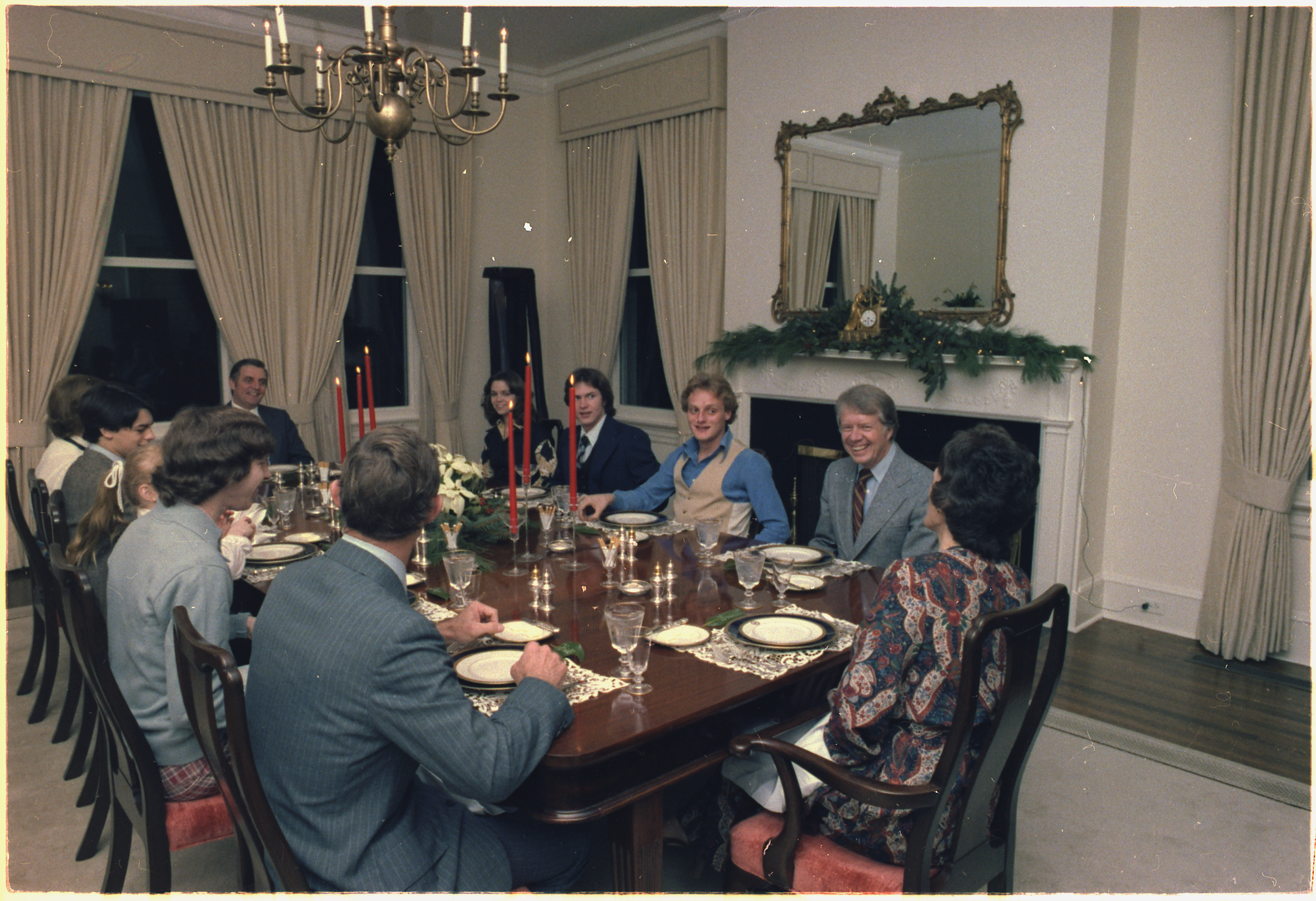

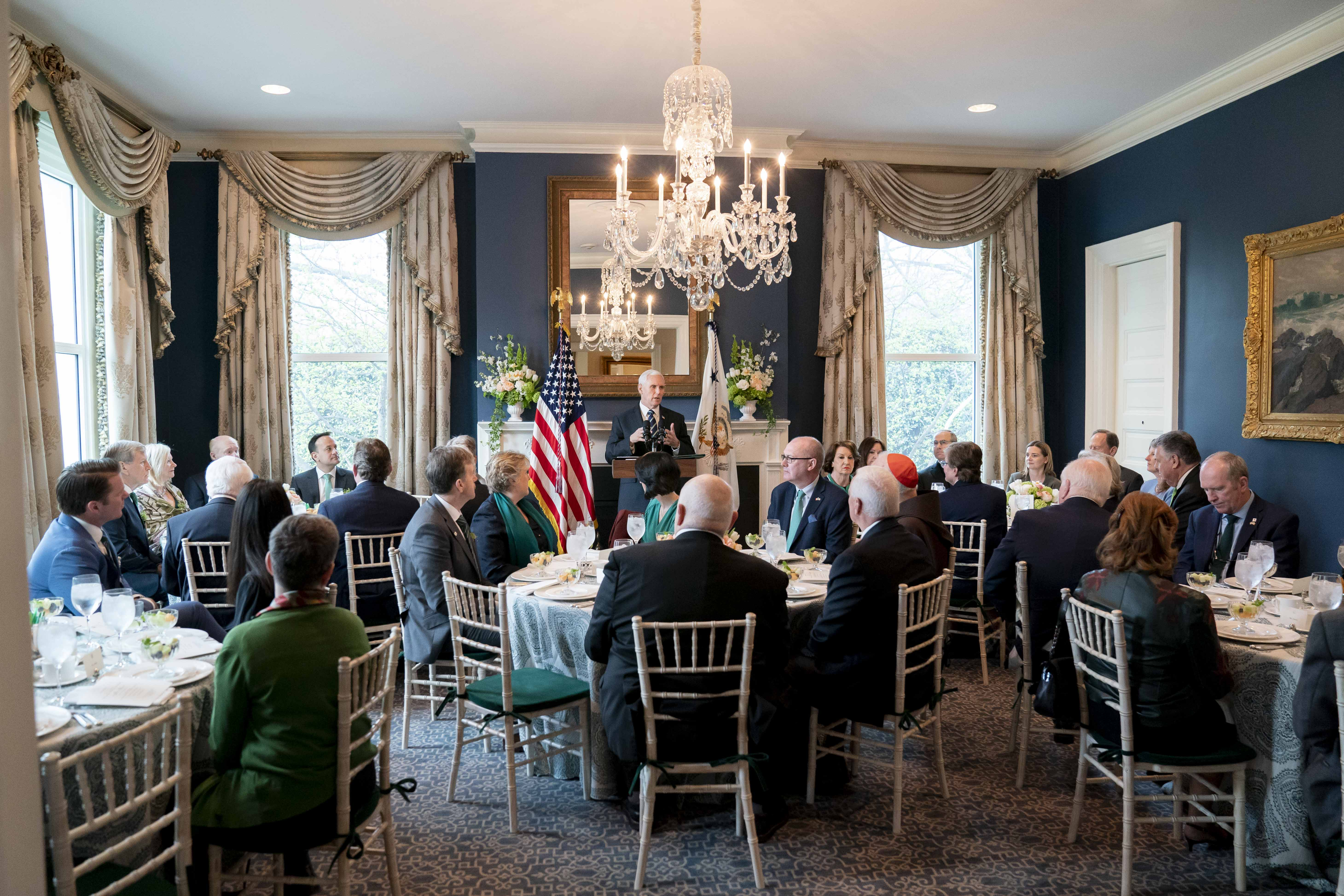
The residency's furnishings can be seen while Vice President Walter Mondale hosts President Jimmy Carter (top in 1977) and while Vice President Mike Pence hosts Irish Taoiseach Leo Varadkar (bottom in 2020).

=== Interior furnishings ===
Most of the furnishings placed in the house following the 1974 renovation were twentieth-century copies of either colonial or Federal style pieces. A notable exception was a bed placed in the house by Nelson Rockefeller. The bed was designed by surrealist artist Max Ernst. Called the "cage" bed, the headboard had the form of a Greek pediment, and the baseboard a lower version of a pediment. The Rockefellers twice offered the bed permanently to the house but it was turned down both by Vice President George H. W. Bush and Vice President Dan Quayle. On visiting Barbara Bush at the house, Mrs. Rockefeller offered her the bed, and Mrs. Bush responded, "you are always welcome in this house, but there's no need to bring your own bed." The Rockefellers did leave a lithograph called "The Great Ignoramus", several antique Korean and Japanese chests, and nearly a dozen other pieces.

Vice Presidents often bring their own furnishings, often for the upstairs rooms, and redecorate to suit their tastes. When the Mondales occupied the house, Joan Mondale introduced more saturated upholstery and wall colors and contemporary art. Like the Rockefellers, the Mondales brought some Asian antiques into the house. The Bush family, working with interior decorator Mark Hampton, used a palette of celadon, lime green, and light blue. The Quayles removed the lime green and used off-white. The Gores oversaw a complete redecoration, the addition of a new dining-room table, new furniture for the library, and a substantial renovation of the grounds and porches to make them more suitable for outdoor entertaining. Immediately before the Cheneys moved in, some needed work on the air conditioning and heating was performed and the interiors were repainted. The Cheneys brought several pieces of contemporary art into the house. Before Vice President Kamala Harris moved in, the Navy refinished the wooden floors and relined the chimneys.

=== Garden and grounds ===
The home is surrounded by a garden planted with cherry trees, Japanese magnolias, tulips and daffodils. In 1989, Dan Quayle installed a putting green. In 1991, Quayle added a pool, hot tub, and pool house. In 2010, Vice President Joe Biden added a tree swing to the grounds as a Valentine's Day present for Second Lady Jill Biden. The grounds include the Family Heritage Garden dedicated in 2012 by the Bidens. The garden contains stones commemorating the vice presidential families who have lived in the house, including pets. The Family Heritage Garden is accented by an arbor, a fountain, and hydrangea plants. Vice President Mike Pence and Second Lady Karen Pence added a beehive to the grounds in 2017 as well as a new basketball court. In 2018, Second Lady Karen Pence lit up the garden to pay tribute to former Vice President and President George H.W. Bush following his passing. In 2024, Vice President Kamala Harris planted a pomegranate tree at the residence to commemorate the 2023 Hamas-led attack on Israel. Vice President JD Vance added a chicken coop to the grounds in 2026. The 73-acre property is bordered by a dense forest, shielding it from the noise of Massachusetts Avenue.

== Privacy and security ==
=== Privacy ===
Unlike the White House, Number One Observatory Circle and the surrounding Naval Observatory do not offer any public tours.

=== Underground bunker ===
In December 2002, following the September 11 attacks, neighbors of the Number One Observatory Circle, then inhabited by Vice President Dick Cheney, complained of loud "blasts" and construction noises. Occurring several times and lasting up to five seconds, the vibrations were able to knock mirrors off the walls of some nearby residences. Neighbors who complained about the construction received a letter from the observatory's superintendent reading, "Due to its sensitive nature in support of national security and homeland defense, project-specific information is classified and cannot be released." It was widely speculated that a nuclear bunker was being constructed.

In 2009, recently inaugurated Vice President Joe Biden reportedly revealed the existence of an underground "9/11" bunker beneath the house. Elizabeth Alexander, Biden's press secretary, explained the following day, "What the vice president described in his comments was not—as some press reports have suggested—an underground facility, but rather, an upstairs work space in the residence, which he understood was frequently used by Vice President Cheney and his aides." The Christian Science Monitor suggested that Biden was actually referring to a tunnel which leads to one of the Navy-operated telescopes on the grounds.

== See also ==
- White House – the official residence of the president of the United States
- Camp David – country retreat for the president of the United States

- Rapidan Camp – the predecessor to Camp David

- Blair House – the official state guest house for the president of the United States
- Tingey House - Chief of Naval Operations' official residence since 1974
