= 1111 Pennsylvania Avenue =

Postmodern office building in Washington, D.C

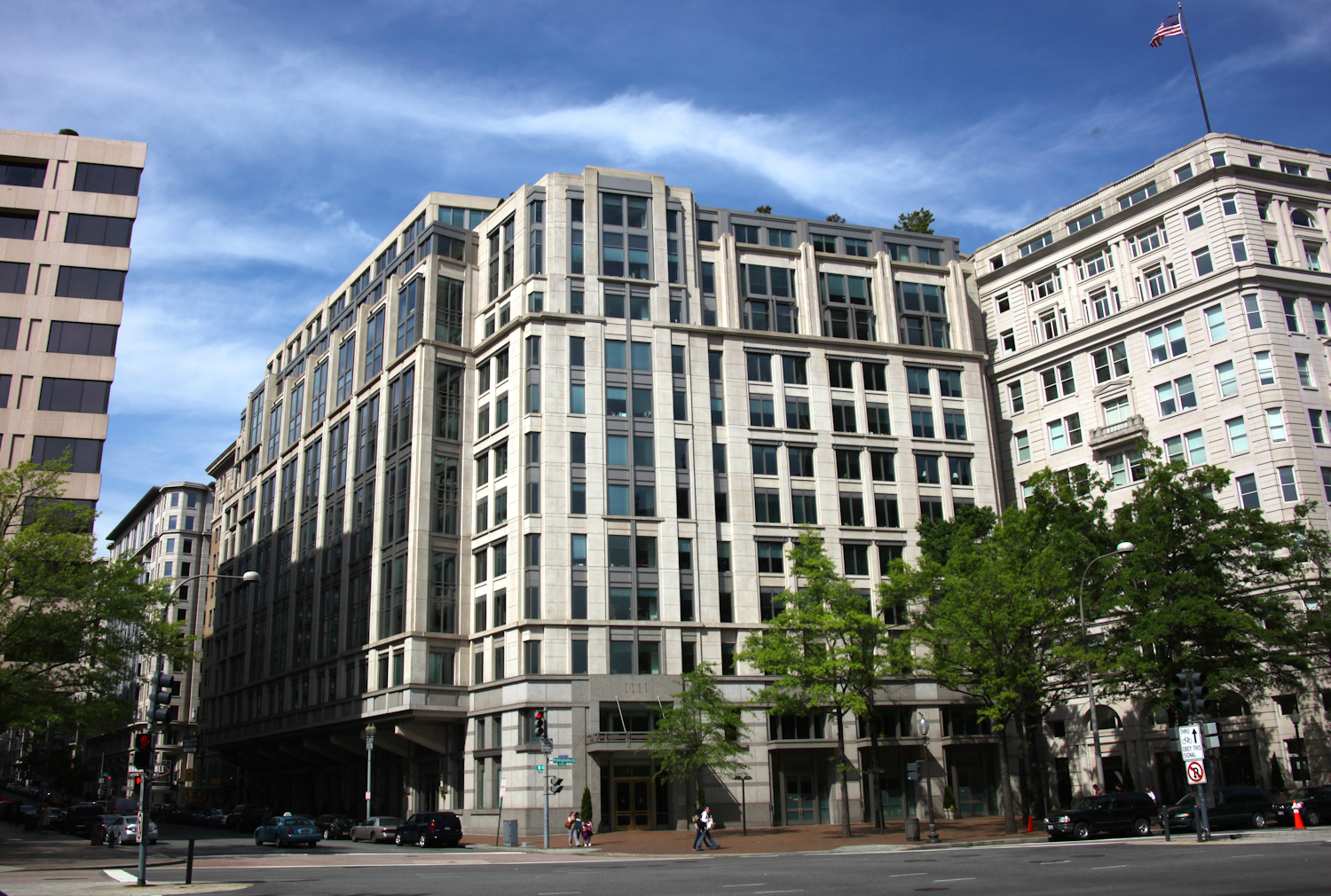
- 1111 Pennsylvania Avenue NW in May 2010
- Interactive map of the 1111 Pennsylvania Avenue area

General information
- Type: Office
- Location: Washington, D.C., United States
- Coordinates: 38.8953041°N 77.0276839°W
- Completed: 1968
- Management: Shorenstein Company, LP

Height
- Roof: 135 feet (41 m); 180 feet (55 m) (renovation)

Technical details
- Floor count: 14
- Floor area: 253,000 square feet (23,500 m^{2}); 334,000 square feet (31,000 m^{2}) (renovation)

Design and construction
- Architects: Edmund W. Dreyfuss & Associates; Shalom Baranes Associates (renovation)
- Developer: Jerry Wolman

1111 Pennsylvania Avenue is a mid-rise Postmodern office building located in Washington, D.C., in the United States. It is 180 feet (55 m) tall, has 14 stories, and has a four-story underground parking garage. It is a "contributing" resource to the Pennsylvania Avenue National Historic Site.

== History of the site ==
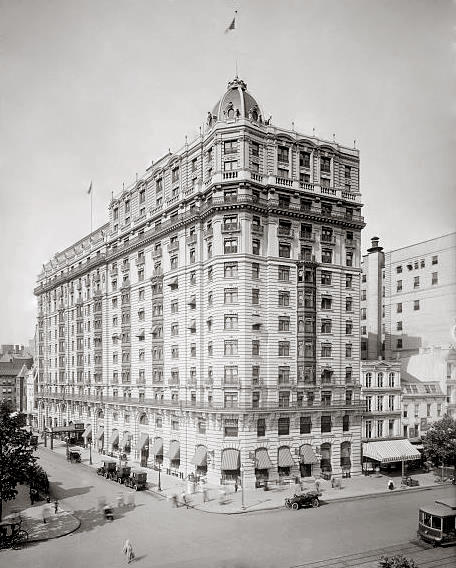
The Raleigh Hotel in 1920.

The site, on the northeast corner of 12th Street NW and Pennsylvania Avenue NW, was originally occupied by the Fountain Inn, erected in 1815 after the burning of Washington. This structure was razed and in 1847 the four-story Fuller Hotel opened. Renamed the Kirkwood House, it was the residence of Vice President Andrew Johnson; he took the oath of office of the president of the United States there in April 1865 after the assassination of President Abraham Lincoln. Kirkwood House was razed in 1875 and replaced with the Shepherd Centennial Building, a seven-story office building in the Second Empire style (it opened in 1876). The Shepherd Centennial Building was converted into a hotel in 1893 by architect Leon E. Dessez and renamed the Raleigh Hotel. The Raleigh Hotel was razed in 1911 and rebuilt by architect Henry Janeway Hardenbergh as a 13-story Beaux Arts hotel with a rusticated brick, white limestone, and terra cotta exterior. Congress changed the height limit for buildings on Pennsylvania Avenue NW from 130 feet (40 m) to 160 feet (49 m) in 1910 in order to accommodate the Raleigh Hotel.

== Current structure ==
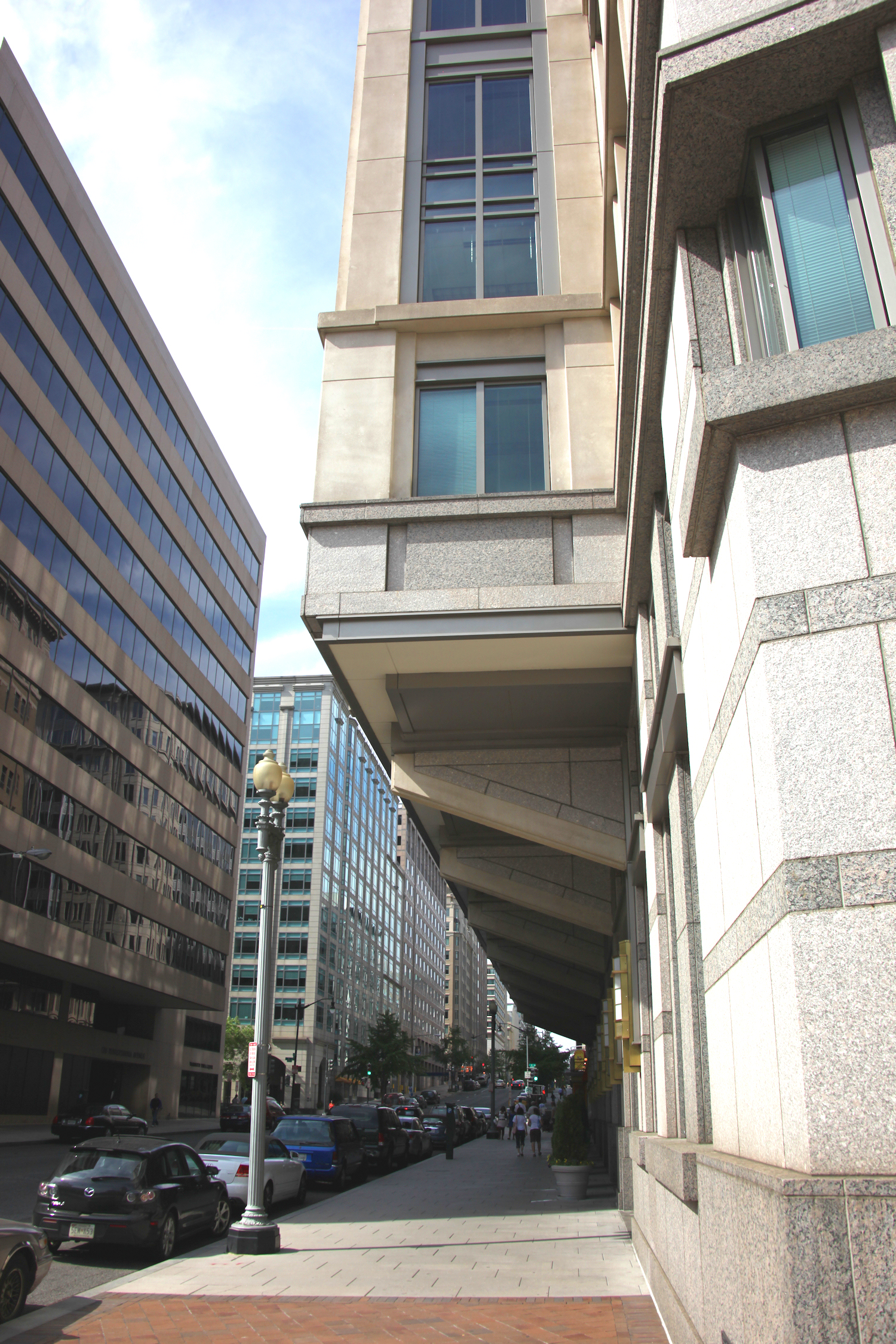
12th Street NW side of 1111 Pennsylvania Avenue NW, depicting the cantilever over the sidewalk.

The Raleigh Hotel closed in 1954, and by 1965 developer Jerry Wolman had purchased the site and proposed building the current structure. It was one of the first structures built under the Pennsylvania Avenue redevelopment plan approved in 1964, and the first private building to be built. Because of restrictions imposed by the Pennsylvania Avenue National Historic Site legislation, Wolman agreed to move the building line back from Pennsylvania Avenue by 50 feet (15 m) and keep the building's height to 135 feet (41 m), although in exchange for the loss of interior square footage District of Columbia zoning officials gave him permission to cantilever the building over the sidewalk on 12th Street at a height about 30 feet (9.1 m) above the street. Named the Presidential Building (or the Presidential Office Building), the structure was designed by Edmund W. Dreyfuss & Associates in the Brutalist style. Dreyfuss worked closely on the building with John Woodbridge, a staff architect for the President's Council on Pennsylvania Avenue and a member of the firm Skidmore, Owings and Merrill. The President's Council chairman was Nathaniel A. Owings, a partner in that firm. The building was completed in mid-1968, and originally had 253,000 square feet (23,500 m^{2}) of interior space. Its address at this time was 415 12th Street NW. The District of Columbia Public Schools leased seven of the floors in the building, with other District government offices renting the remaining space.

=== 2002 renovation ===
Purchased by local surgeon Laszlo Tauber, one of the richest men in the D.C. area, the structure underwent a $40 million renovation between 2000 and 2002. It was the last private building on Pennsylvania Avenue to be renovated under the Pennsylvania Avenue Development Corporation's 1974 redevelopment plan. The facade was replaced with a Postmodern style more in tune with the nearby Evening Star building addition next to it on Pennsylvania Avenue, and two stories were added. The total interior space increased from 253,000 square feet (23,500 m^{2}) to 334,000 square feet (31,000 m^{2}). The front entrance was moved from 12th Street NW to Pennsylvania Avenue NW, and the address changed to 1111 Pennsylvania Avenue NW. The architect of record for the structural renovations was Shalom Baranes Associates. Studios Architecture designed the interiors.

An 8-foot-wide space (2.4 m) existed between the renovated structure and the Evening Star building addition to the east. In order to create natural light in the office windows facing the Evening Star building, Studios Architecture built a light pipe—a 120-foot-long (37 m), 6.5-foot-wide (2.0 m), 5-short-ton (4.5 t) prism designed to convey natural sunlight down to all floors and into all offices. On cloudy days and at night, the light pipe is artificially illuminated with a rainbow of colors.

The law firm of Morgan, Lewis & Bockius leased the entire building in 2002, and signed a long-term lease renewal in 2014.

== See also ==
- List of tallest buildings in Washington, D.C.
