= Engine Company 27 (Washington, D.C.) =

- U.S. National Register of Historic Places
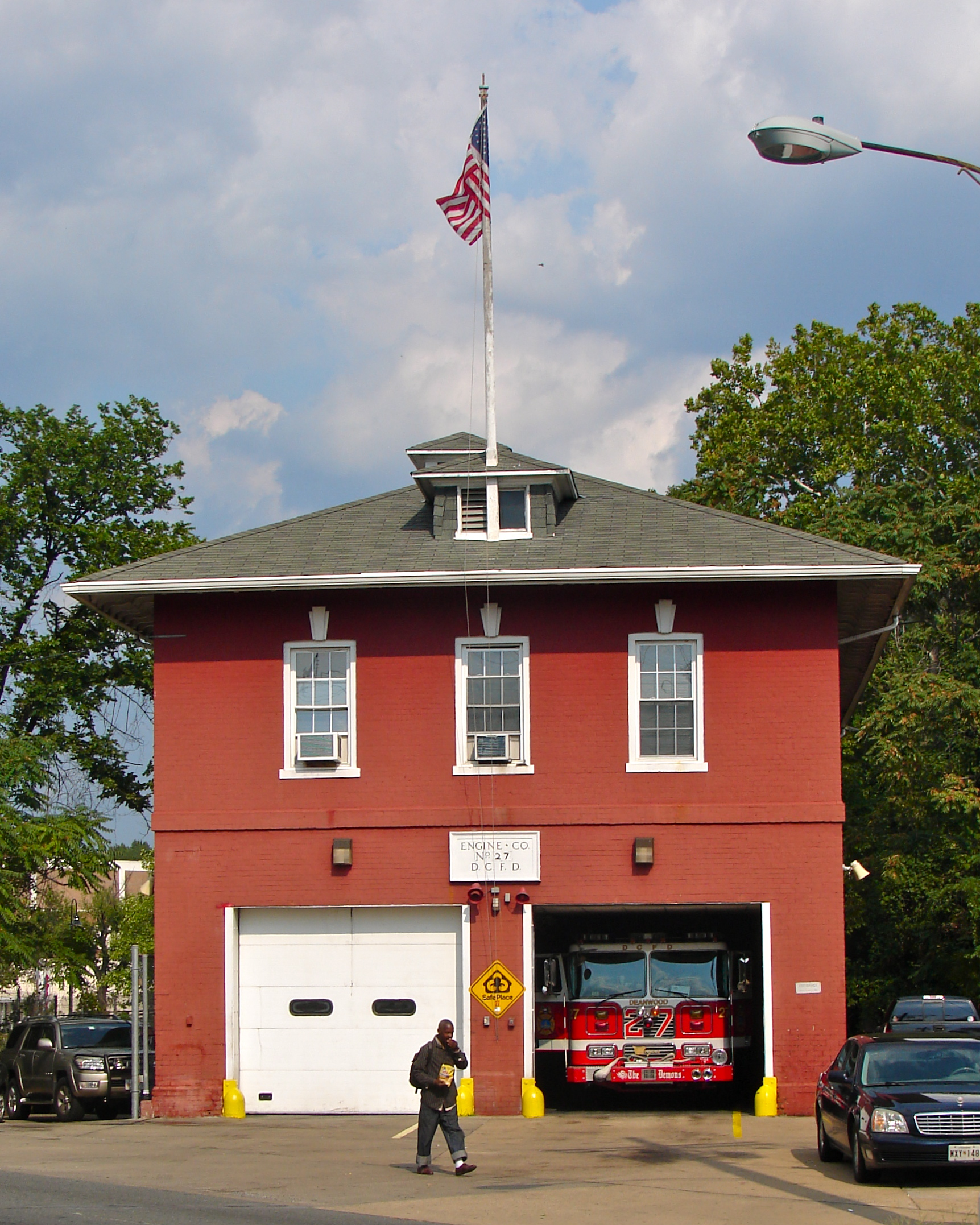
- Engine Company 27 building (2011)

- Location within District of Columbia
- Location: 4409 Minnesota Ave, NE, Washington, District of Columbia
- Coordinates: 38°54′04″N 76°56′36″W
- Area: less than one acre
- Built: 1908
- Architect: Leon E. Dessez
- MPS: Firehouses in Washington DC MPS
- NRHP reference No.: 11000284
- Added to NRHP: May 18, 2011

Engine Company 27 also known as the Deanwood Firehouse is a historic firehouse located at 4409 Minnesota Ave., NE, Washington, D.C.

== History ==
It was designed by Leon E. Dessez and completed in 1908. It originally housed Chemical Company 1, which served areas not yet connected to fire hydrants. On June 15, 1914, this company was replaced by Engine Company 27 which went in service with a 1906 American LaFrance Metropolitan 500 GPM steam fire engine and a 1903 American LaFrance 70 gallon double tank combination chemical/hose wagon.

At 6:00 PM on May 4, 1945, Engine Company 27 became the second firehouse in the District to be staffed entirely by African Americans, the first having been Engine Company 4. Joseph A. Briscoe was promoted from lieutenant to captain and served as the first station commander, Rafael Smith was promoted from sergeant to lieutenant, and Clarence J Short was promoted from private to sergeant.

The building was listed on the National Register of Historic Places in May, 2011 as part of the Firehouses in Washington DC multiple property submission.

In 2021, Engine 27 moved to a newly-built firehouse one-quarter mile north at 4409 Minnesota Ave NE.
