= Engine Company 16-Truck Company 3 =

- U.S. National Register of Historic Places

- Location within District of Columbia
- Location: 1018 13th St., NW; Washington, D.C.
- Coordinates: 38°54′12″N 77°01′47″W
- Built: 1932
- Architect: Albert L. Harris
- Architectural style: Federal
- MPS: Firehouses in Washington DC MPS
- NRHP reference No.: 11000281
- Added to NRHP: May 18, 2011

Engine Company 16-Truck Company 3 is a fire station and a historic structure located in the Downtown area of Washington, D.C. It was listed on both the District of Columbia Inventory of Historic Sites and on the National Register of Historic Places in 2011. The three-story brick building was designed by Albert L. Harris and built in 1932.
