= John H. Glenn Jr. (fireboat) =

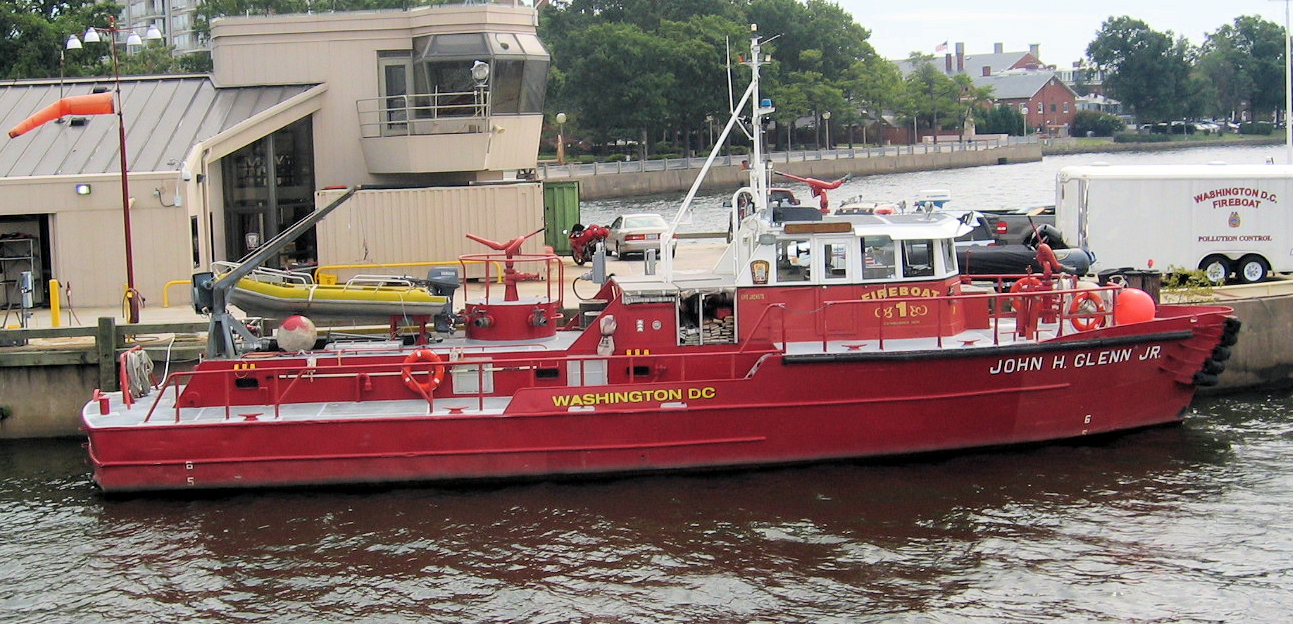
- The John H. Glenn Jr. docked in Washington, D.C., on September 16, 2010.

History
- Name: John H. Glenn Jr.
- Namesake: John Glenn, astronaut
- Owner: New York City Fire Department
- Launched: 1962-09-22
- Fate: Sold to DCFD, 1977

History

- Owner: District of Columbia Fire and Emergency Medical Services Department
- Acquired: 1977
- Status: Active

General characteristics
- Class & type: Fireboat
- Displacement: 84 tons
- Length: 71 ft (22 m)
- Beam: 21 ft (6.4 m)
- Draught: 5 ft (1.5 m)
- Installed power: 3 × 450 hp (340 kW)
- Speed: 20 knots (37 km/h)
- Crew: 4
- Notes: Pumping capacity: 3,000 US gallons (11,000 L) / min. (initial design); 5,000 US gallons (19,000 L) / min. (during FDNY service); 7,000 US gallons (26,000 L) / min. (during DCFD service)

The John H. Glenn Jr. is a fireboat stationed on the Potomac and Anacostia rivers in Washington, D.C. Her bow was reinforced in 1984, allowing her to also serve as an icebreaker during the winter.

The vessel served the New York City Fire Department for her first fifteen years before being sold to the District of Columbia Fire and Emergency Medical Services Department in 1977. When she was built, she was both faster than her older fleet-mates, and had a shallower draft, making her well-suited to be stationed in a region of the Hudson River with areas of shallow water.

In 2012, Washington, D.C.'s Inspector General published a report that the John Glenn's maintenance had been dangerously neglected. The report noted that, in addition to not implementing a program of general inspection, the city had neglected to plan or budget for a replacement for the fifty-year-old vessel. The report listed hundreds of other municipalities who had been able to replace or upgrade their fireboats through FEMA Port Security Grants, but that Washington DC had not applied for a grant. The report estimated that it would cost $7 million to replace the John H. Glenn Jr. with an equivalent, modern vessel. In October 2014 the Washington City Paper noted that, rather than respond to the report city government had merely left the vessel at her moorings. Similarly, budget problems had forced the fire department to take half its fleet of firetrucks out of service, because it could not afford to keep them in running order.

== Incidents ==
In 1982, the John H. Glenn Jr. and the city's other vessels tried to rescue people when an Air Florida airliner collided with the 14th Street Bridge. Ice impeded their efforts. Seventy people died in the incident. Subsequently, the John Glenn was retrofitted with an icebreaking bow.

On January 31, 2009, the excursion vessel Spirit of Washington smashed into the dock shared by the fire department and police department's boats, damaging the John H. Glenn Jr.
