= Engine Company 22 =

- U.S. National Register of Historic Places
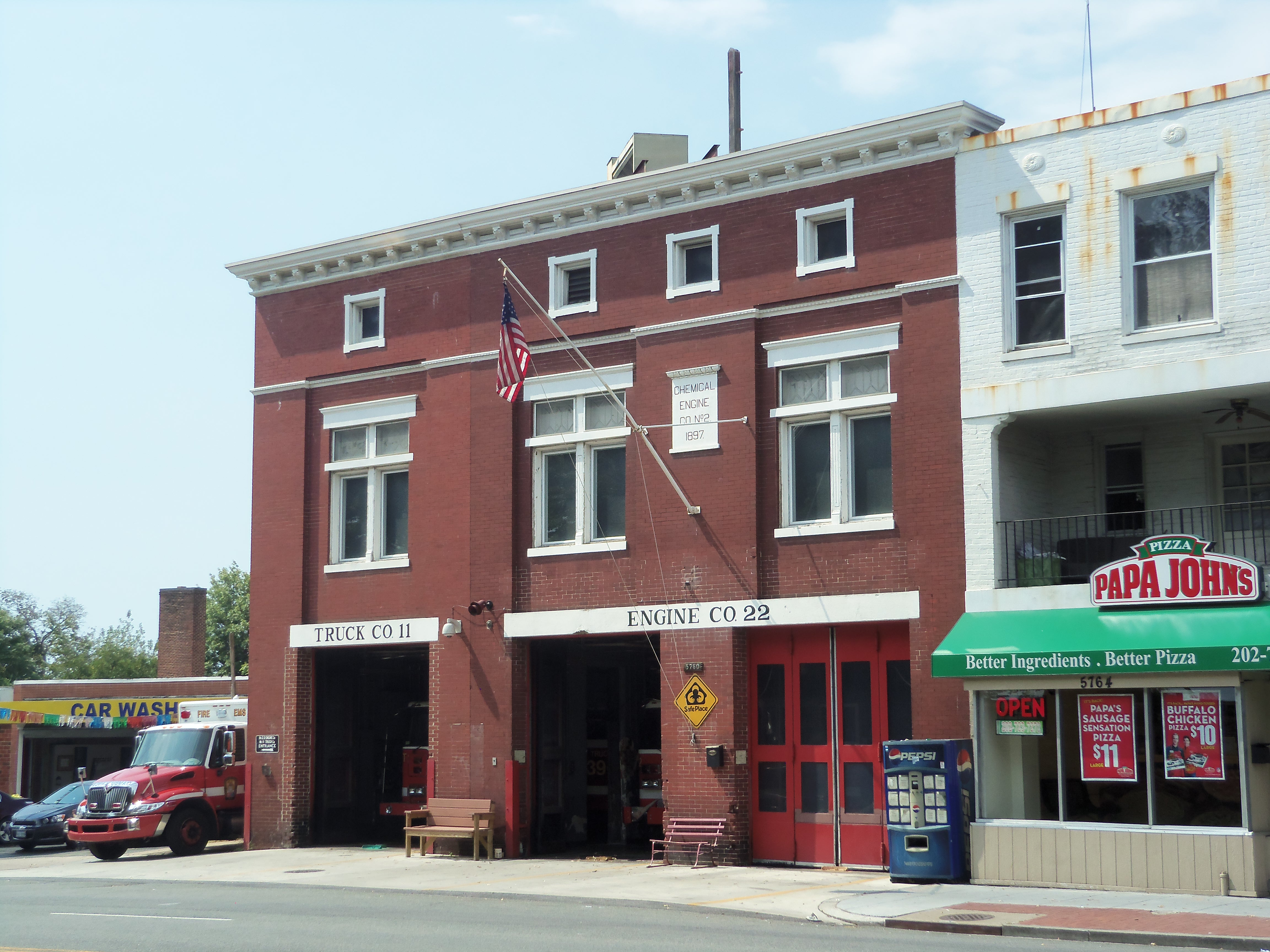
- Engine Company 22 building (2011)

- Location within District of Columbia
- Location: #5760 Georgia Ave., NW; Washington, D.C.
- Coordinates: 38°57′36″N 77°01′42″W
- Built: 1897, 1907–1911
- Architect: Leon E. Dessez
- MPS: Firehouses in Washington DC MPS
- NRHP reference No.: 11000282
- Added to NRHP: May 18, 2011

Engine Company 22, also known as the Brightwood Firehouse, was a fire station at 5760 Georgia Ave NW and it is also a historic structure located in the Brightwood Park neighborhood in Washington, D.C., United States. It was listed on both the District of Columbia Inventory of Historic Sites and on the National Register of Historic Places in 2011. The two-story brick building was designed by Leon E. Dessez and built in stages. It was initially completed in 1897 and then enlarged between 1907 and 1911. The current address of DCFD Engine Company 22 and Truck Company 11 is 6825 Georgia Ave NW.
