= Engine Company 25 (Washington, D.C.) =

- Engine Company No. 25
- U.S. National Register of Historic Places
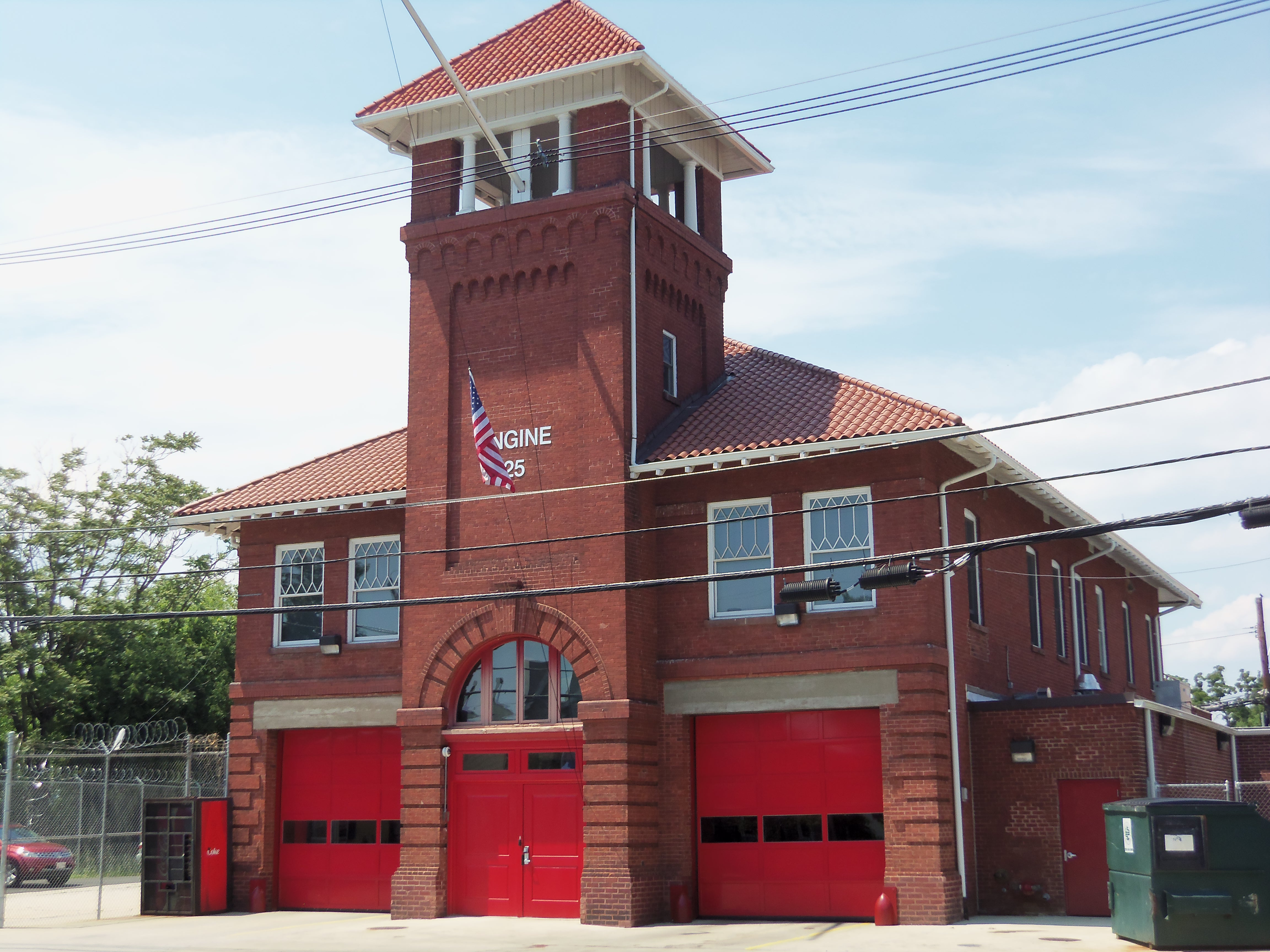
- Engine Company 25 building (2011)

- Location within the District of Columbia Location within the United States
- Location: 3203 Martin Luther King Jr., Ave SE, Washington, District of Columbia
- Coordinates: 38°50′35″N 77°0′3″W
- Area: 0.2 acres (0.081 ha)
- Built: 1901
- Architect: Snowden Ashford
- Architectural style: Mediterranean Revival
- MPS: Firehouses in Washington DC MPS
- NRHP reference No.: 07000593
- Added to NRHP: June 27, 2007

Engine Company No. 25 is a historic firehouse located at 3203 Martin Luther King Jr., Ave SE, in Congress Heights, Washington, District of Columbia.

== History ==
It was built in 1901 and, starting in 1903, served by Chemical Company 5, which served in areas where water hydrants were not yet available. Its original equipment was a 1903 American LaFrance double tank 170 gallon chemical engine. In July 1913 Company 5 was disbanded and Engine Company 25 occupied the firehouse. Its original equipment was a 1913 Ahrens Fox 700 GPM motor pumper.

Two of the stations firefighters have been killed in the line of duty. Private Edward F. Laughton on March 2, 1927, and Private Lloyd A. Irwin on December 4, 1947.

In 2007 the firehouse was listed by the National Register of Historic Places as part of the Firehouses in Washington D.C. Multiple Property Submission.

== Dispatches from Eng. Co. 25 ==
April 19, 1981 The Washington Post Magazine completed a full magazine spread about the rich history and heroic actions performed by the men of Engine Company 25. In 1980, Engine company 25 was the busiest company in the District with 2,533 alarms.

In 1981, Firehouse magazine published “A Firehouse Exclusive”. An informal survey to compare alarm responses of fire departments throughout the United States and Canada. Engine Company 25 was ranked tenth overall for run responses with 2,695 alarms.

== Past engines ==
- 1903 American La France
- 1913 Ahrens Fox
- 2000 Seagrave (S-135)
- 2006 Seagrave Marauder II (S-167)
- 2014 Pierce Arrow (S-190)
