= Leon E. Dessez =

American architect

Leon Emil Dessez
- Born: April 12, 1858; Washington, D.C., US
- Died: December 25, 1918 (aged 60)
- Occupation: Architect
- Known for: Architect, First resident of Chevy Chase, Maryland

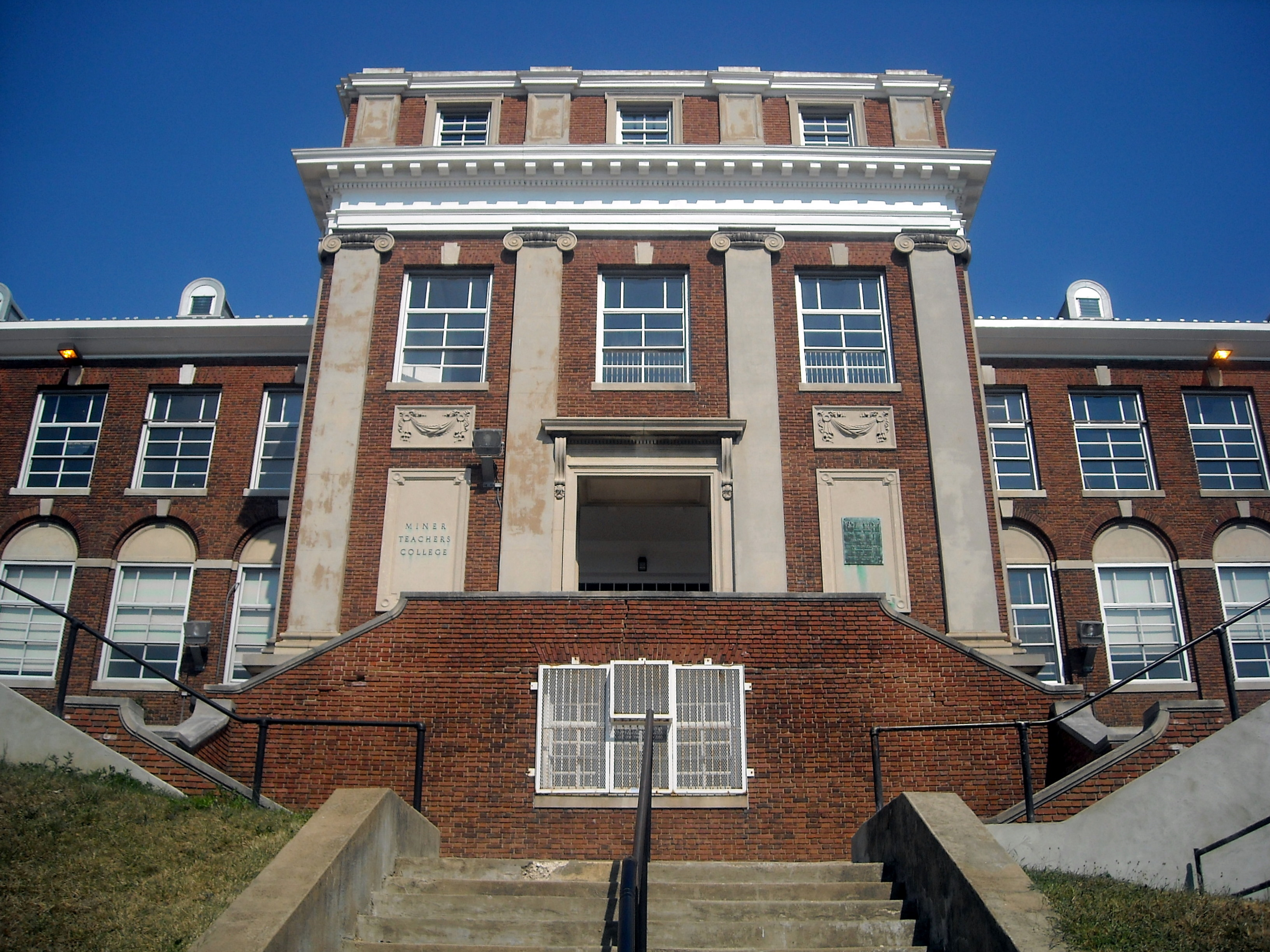
Normal School for Colored Girls (which became Miners Teachers College), a Colonial Revival Architecture style building

Leon Emil Dessez (April 12, 1858 – December 25, 1918) was an American architect in Washington, D.C. He designed public buildings in the District of Columbia, and residences there and in Maryland, and Virginia, including some of the first in Chevy Chase, Maryland, where he was the community's first resident. His D.C. work includes the 1893 conversion of the Shepherd Centennial Building into the Raleigh Hotel and the Normal School for Colored Girls (1913), designed with Snowden Ashford.

== Early life ==
Dessez was born in Washington, D.C., on April 12, 1858. He was the son of Jean Baptiste and Maria Wilhelmina (Gebhardt) Dessez, French immigrants. It was a large family of five sons and three daughters. His father was a civic engineer and worked as a military engineer to build fortifications for the Battle of Richmond.

He married Elizabeth "Bessie" Semmes in 1885 and had two children.

== Career ==
Dessez began his career employed under Colonel Thomas Lincoln Casey on plans for the Washington Monument and spent three years as an architectural and engineering draftsman in the Navy Yard at Washington. He and Lindley Johnson of Philadelphia designed the first four houses in Chevy Chase, Maryland, and Dessez became its first resident.

Dessez was elected to the American Institute of Architects as a fellow in 1896. The following year, he helped charter AIA's Washington, D.C., chapter. He served on a committee for the restoration of the Octagon House, now the AIA headquarters. He also worked pro bono to develop Washington's building codes and investigated school building construction and design.

He died in Washington on December 25, 1918.

The National Register of Historic Places includes several buildings he designed, including: Lucinda Cady House, 7064 Eastern Ave., NW. Washington, D.C.; Engine House No. 10, 1341 Maryland Ave., NE. Washington, D.C.; Miner Normal School, 2565 Georgia Ave., NW. Washington, D.C.; and Truck Company F, 1336-1338 Park Rd. NW Washington, D.C.

== Other works ==
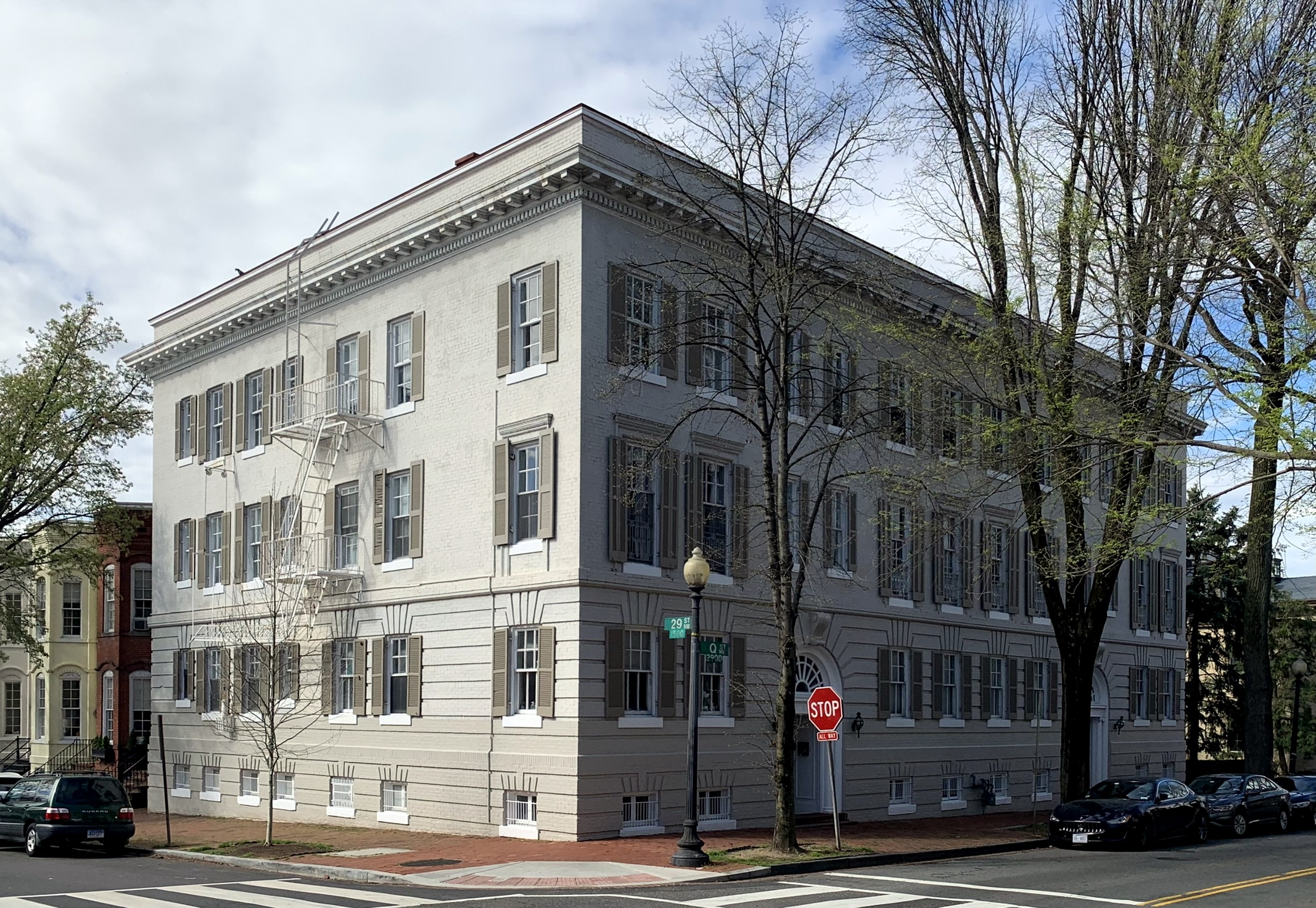
The Stoddert (1899)

- G.E. Hamilton Residence
- 628 E. Capitol St. NE (1885)
- Official residence for the vice president at the Naval Observatory, known as the Admiral's House (1893) on Observatory Circle, at Massachusetts Ave. at 34th St. NW. A Late Victorian red brick building (since painted over) the porched home was built with a turret and dormers.
- 926 F Street Northwest, a three-story brick building for law firm Wold and Cohen.
- Gallinger Hospital which became District of Columbia General Hospital
- Workhouse at Occoquan, now the Lorton Reformatory, 1909 The planning "revolutionized the architecture of penal institutions" with its open air design.
- The Stoddert (1899), 2900 Q Street NW; Apartment building in Georgetown
- House ("residence") for E.J. Stellwagen (1899 plans), Baltimore (i.e., Biltmore) Street and Columbia Road (lot 2, block 2), N.W., Cliffbourne, Washington, D.C.
- Corby Mansion (C. 1893) 9 Chevy Chase Circle, was Senator Francis G. Newlands house from 1893 to 1898, remodeled in 1911
- St. James Episcopal Church 1891–1897 14 Cornwall St, Leesburg, Virginia, later additions were added (1931?)
- Kappa House (1908) 1708 S Street, NW. Originally a residence, it became the Washington DC Alumni chapter of Kappa Alpha Psi fraternity since June 4, 1949. Georgian architecture style
- Garfield Memorial Hospital, replaced by Washington Hospital Center
- Soldiers' Home, Washington, D.C., now the Armed Forces Retirement Home
- D.S. Porter House (plans) 1894 9 East Lenox Street, Chevy Chase. Craftsman and Colonial Revival architectural styles
- Powell Junior High School (1910) demolished
- Fairmont Field Club (1912) Destroyed by fire 2008
