= District of Columbia Public Library =

Library system serving Washington, D.C., United States

- Location: Washington, D.C., U.S.
- Established: 1896; 130 years ago
- Branches: 26

Access and use
- Population served: 700,000

Other information
- Budget: $58 Million
- Director: Richard Reyes-Gavilan
- Website: www.dclibrary.org

The District of Columbia Public Library (DCPL) is the public library system for Washington, D.C., United States. The system includes 26 libraries including Martin Luther King Jr. Memorial Library, DCPL's central library.

== History ==
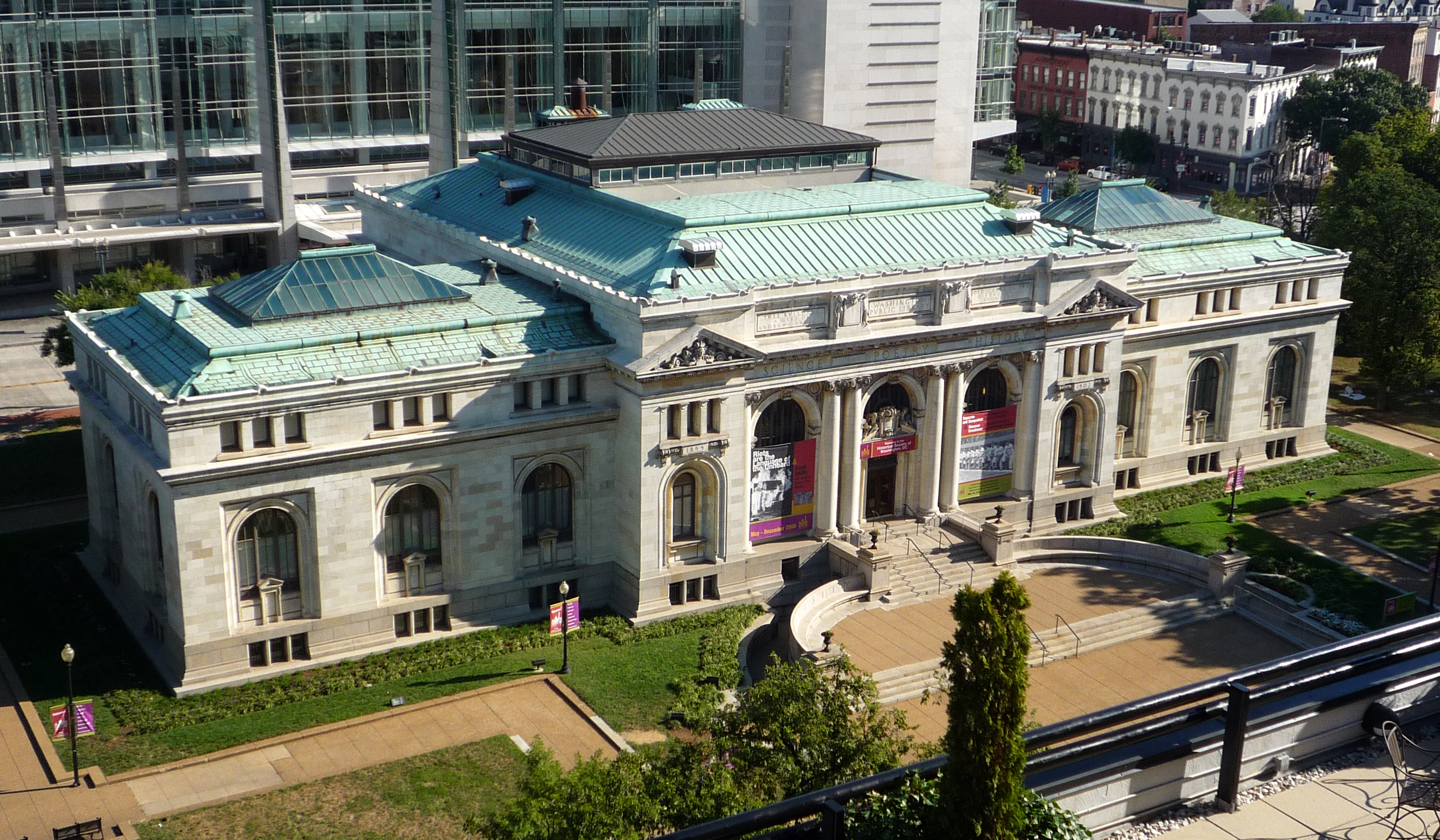
Carnegie Library of Washington D.C. formerly served as the DCPL's Central Public Library.

In October 1895, in preparation for the library's establishment, founders rented two rooms in the McLean Building at 1517 H Street NW to begin acquiring and processing materials to be used in what would then be called the Washington City Free Library.

The library was founded in 1896 by an act of Congress after a lobbying effort by Theodore W. Noyes, editor of the Washington Evening Star newspaper. Noyes served on the library's board of trustees for 50 years.

The first library branch after congressional authorization was located in a home at 1326 New York Avenue NW, with a collection of 15,000 donated books and an appropriation of $6,720 for its maintenance. It would in 1903 be replaced by a far grander structure.

Around 1900, local banker and developer Brainard Warner was serving as vice president of library board of trustees when he "seized on a chance meeting with Andrew Carnegie" to ask him to fund public libraries in the city. Carnegie ultimately funded four, starting with the central library at Mount Vernon Square. Opened in 1903, the library was the city's first desegregated public building. President Theodore Roosevelt attended its dedication. Today the building houses the Historical Society of Washington, D.C., and an Apple Store. Three branch libraries, all still in use, were also built with funds donated by Carnegie.

In 1972, the main library was replaced by a Ludwig Mies van der Rohe-designed building dedicated as a memorial to Martin Luther King Jr.

The first neighborhood branch was the Takoma Park Neighborhood Library. As of 2024, the last new full-service branch to open (and not replace a previous building) was the Rosedale Neighborhood Library, which opened in 2012 in Kingman Park. The most recent rebuilt library to open was the Lamond-Riggs/Lillian J. Huff Neighborhood Library, which opened in 2022 in Queens Chapel.

In 2023, library officials announced that they were considering whether to close the Juanita E. Thornton/Shepherd Park Neighborhood Library and move it further south to fill a service gap. In 2024, construction started on a two-year renovation project for the Southeast Neighborhood Library on Capitol Hill, while the city started the process of replacing the Chevy Chase Neighborhood Library with a new building that would include a library and affordable housing.

== Governance ==
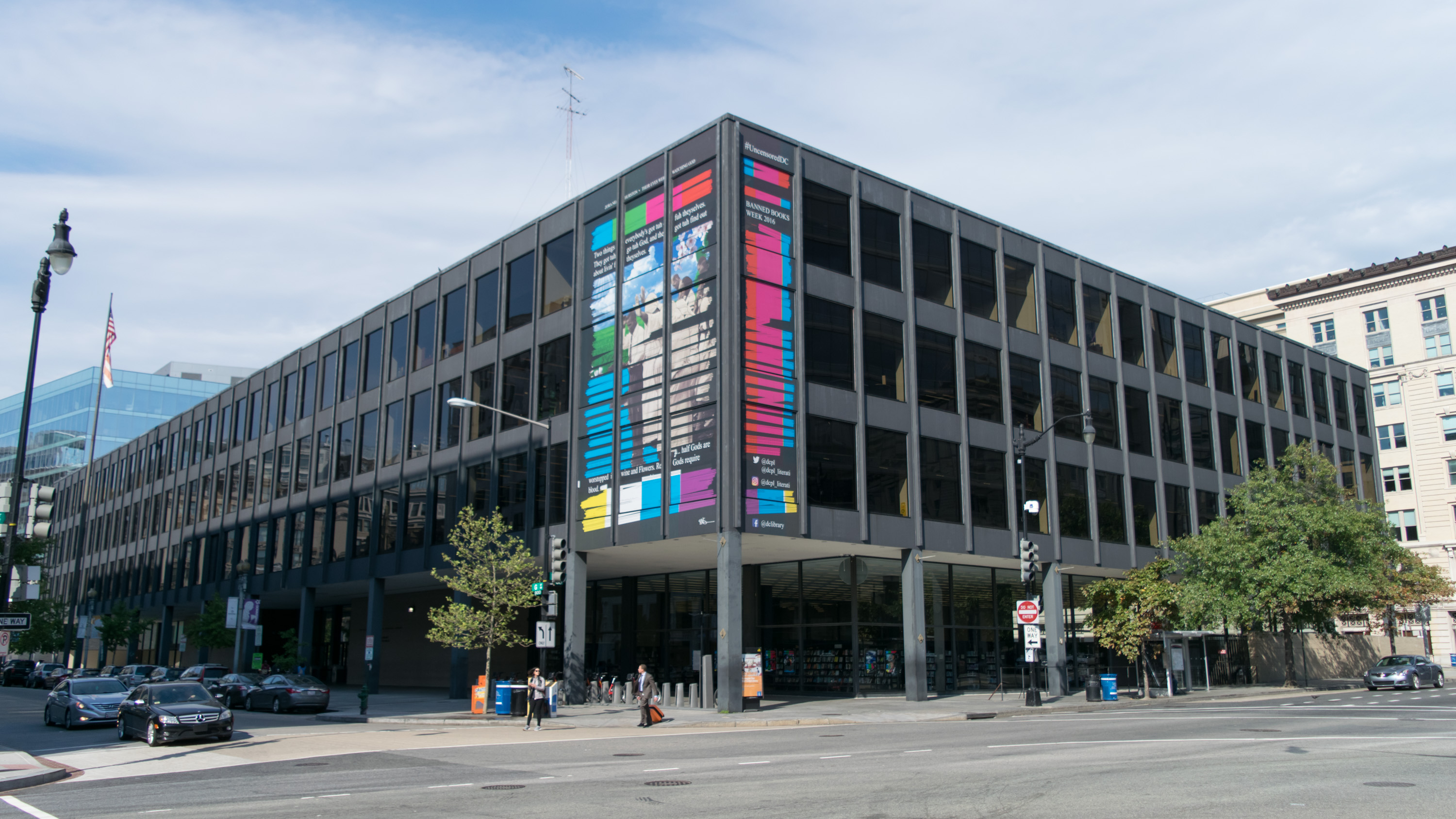
Martin Luther King Jr. Memorial Library, the DCPL's central library

DCPL is an independent agency of the District of Columbia government, managed by a Chief Librarian that is selected and reviewed by a Board of Library Trustees. The Board of Library Trustees are appointed by the Mayor of the District of Columbia, subject to review and approval by the Council of the District of Columbia. The budget is also determined by the Council of the District of Columbia based on a request submitted by the Mayor as part of the annual budget process for the entire government. The United States Congress also has to approve of the District's budget as a part of their oversight of the District of Columbia as the nation's capital.

The Chief Librarian is often invited to attend the Mayor's Cabinet meetings and works closely with the District Administrator on how to execute the DCPL budget. The District's Chief Financial Officer provides a fiscal officer from that office to ensure that financial practices within DCPL meet with District requirements. DCPL also has independent procurement authority, allowing them to execute contracts for books, electronic resources, furniture, equipment, and construction services.

In addition to the Board of Library Trustees, the Council of the District of Columbia provides oversight for DCPL via a Council Committee on Recreation, Libraries and Youth Affairs. Previously, libraries were managed by the Committee on Education. The DC Council routinely has Performance Oversight and Budget hearings for the D.C. libraries annually.

== Police ==
The DCPL has its own small police force, the District of Columbia Public Library Police. The Library Police's duties and mission is similar to District of Columbia Protective Services Division: to protect government property, staff, and the public. The types of incidents that occur are thefts, assaults, destruction of property, and so on.

== Branches ==
Some of DCPL's branch libraries

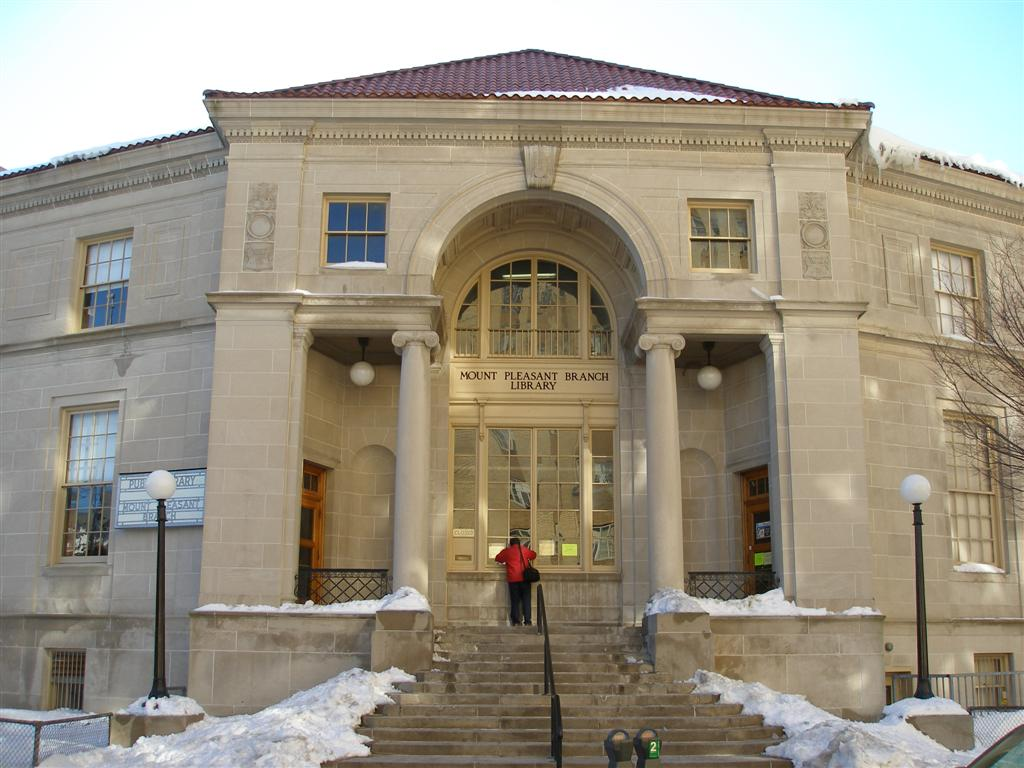
Mount Pleasant Library

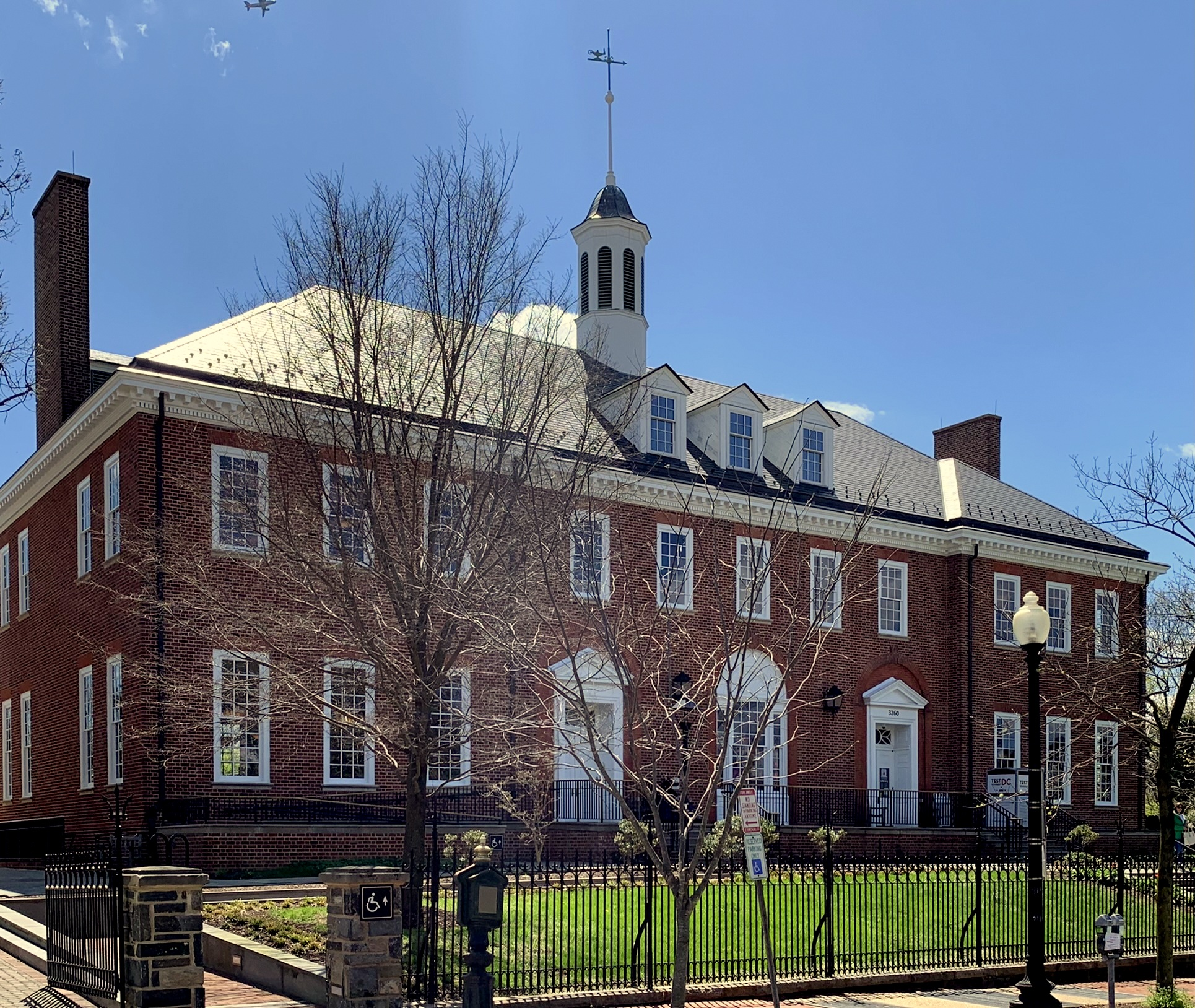
Georgetown Library

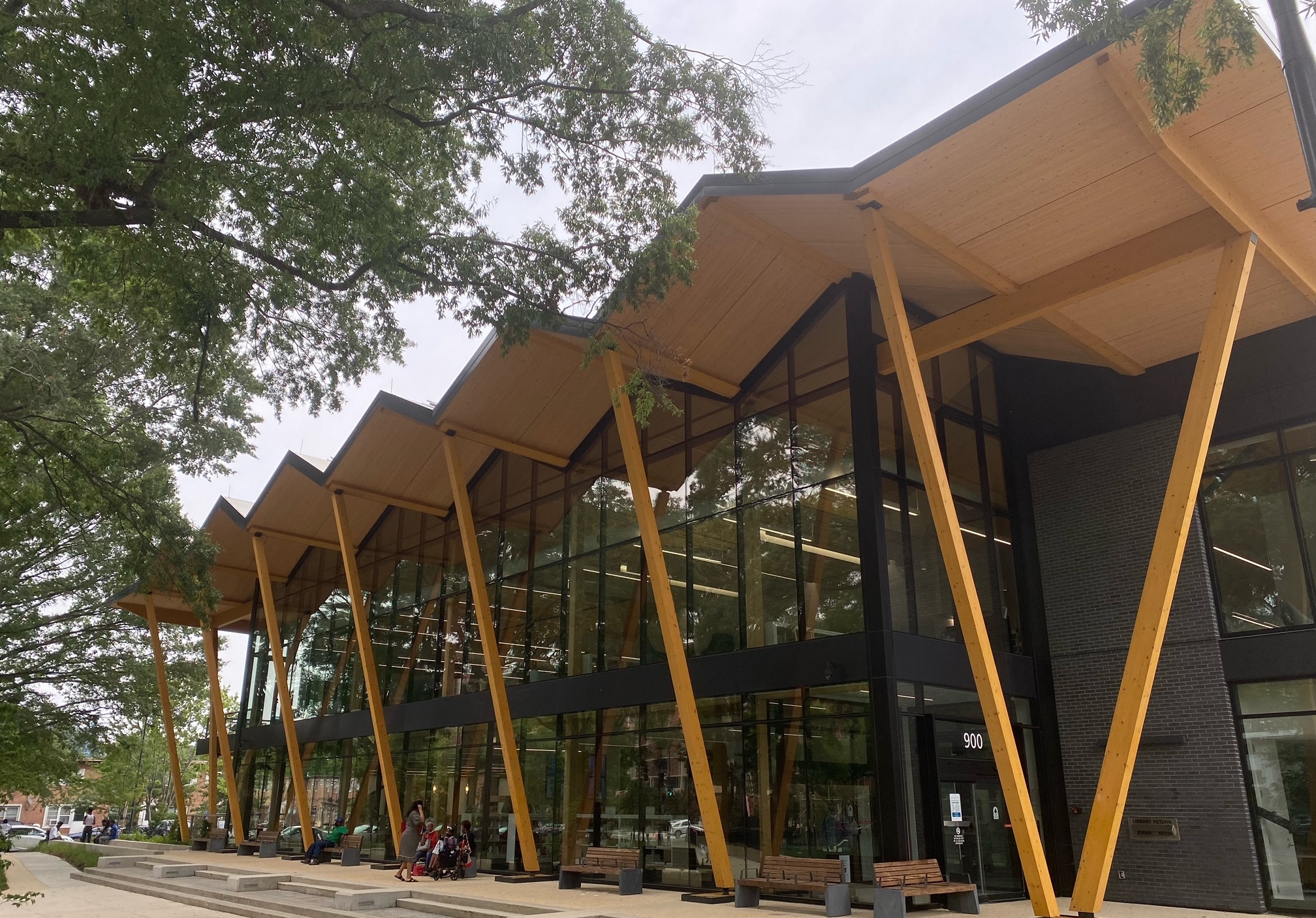
Southwest Library

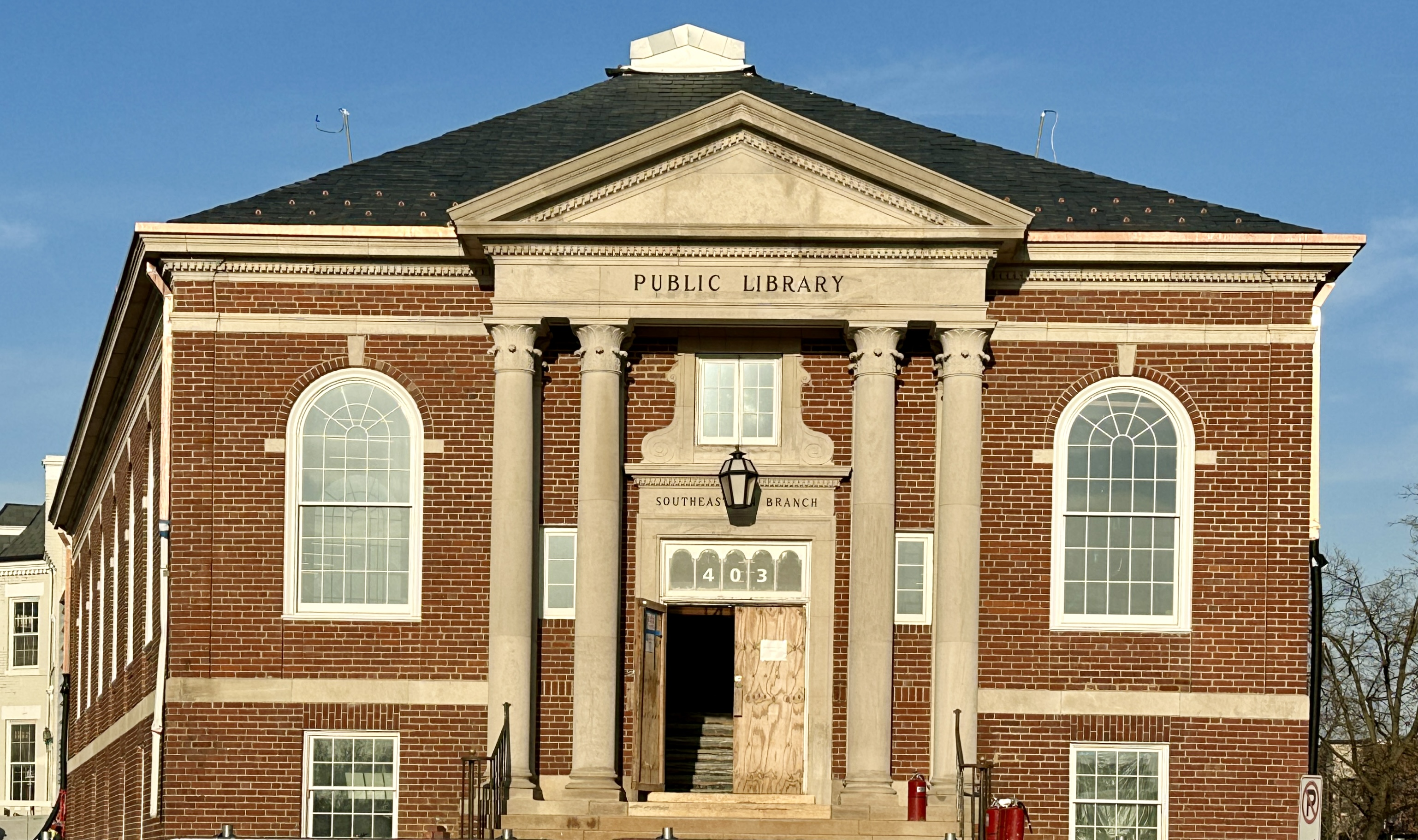
Southeast Library

Tenley-Friendship Library

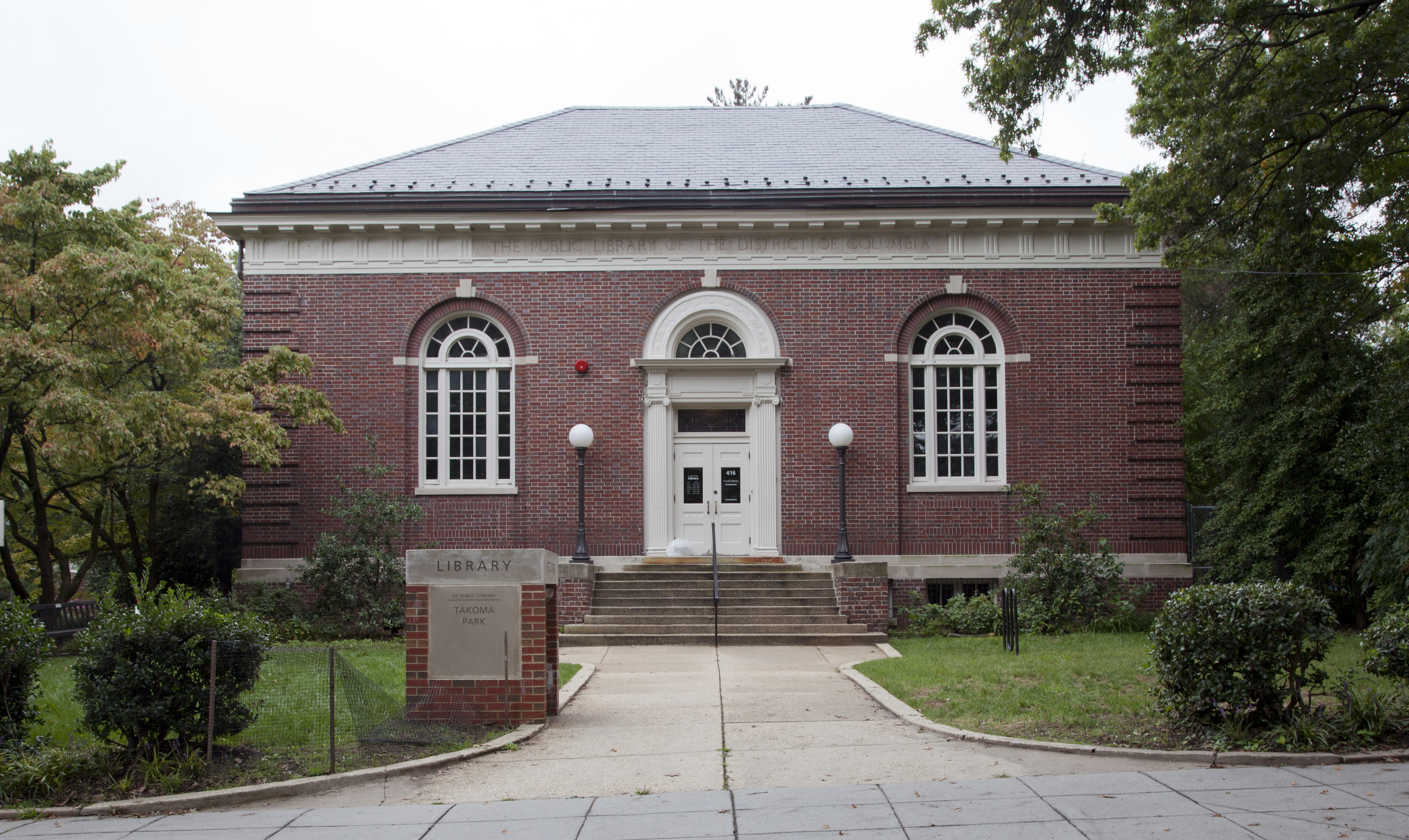
Takoma Park Library

Shaw Library

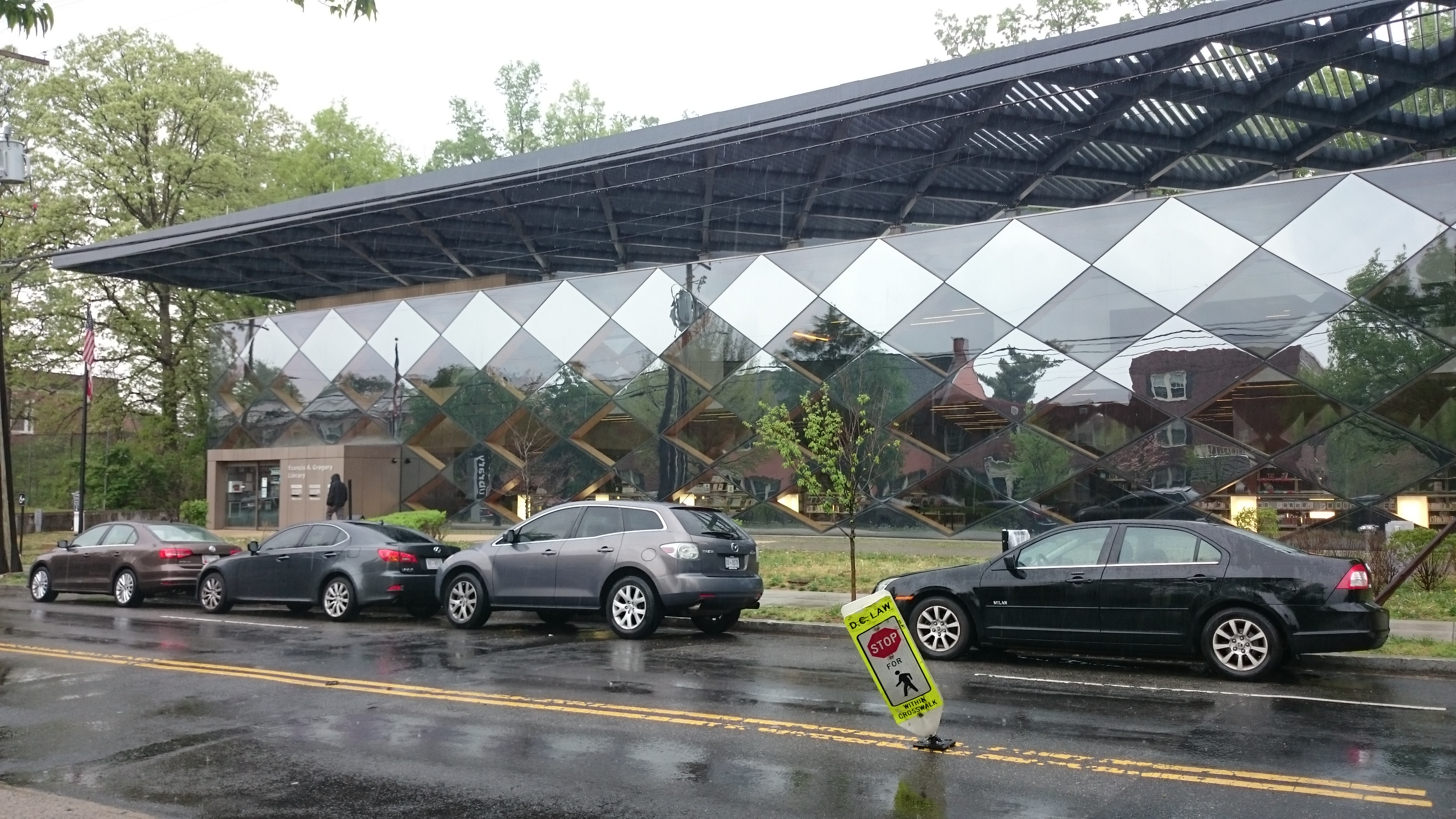
Francis A. Gregory Library

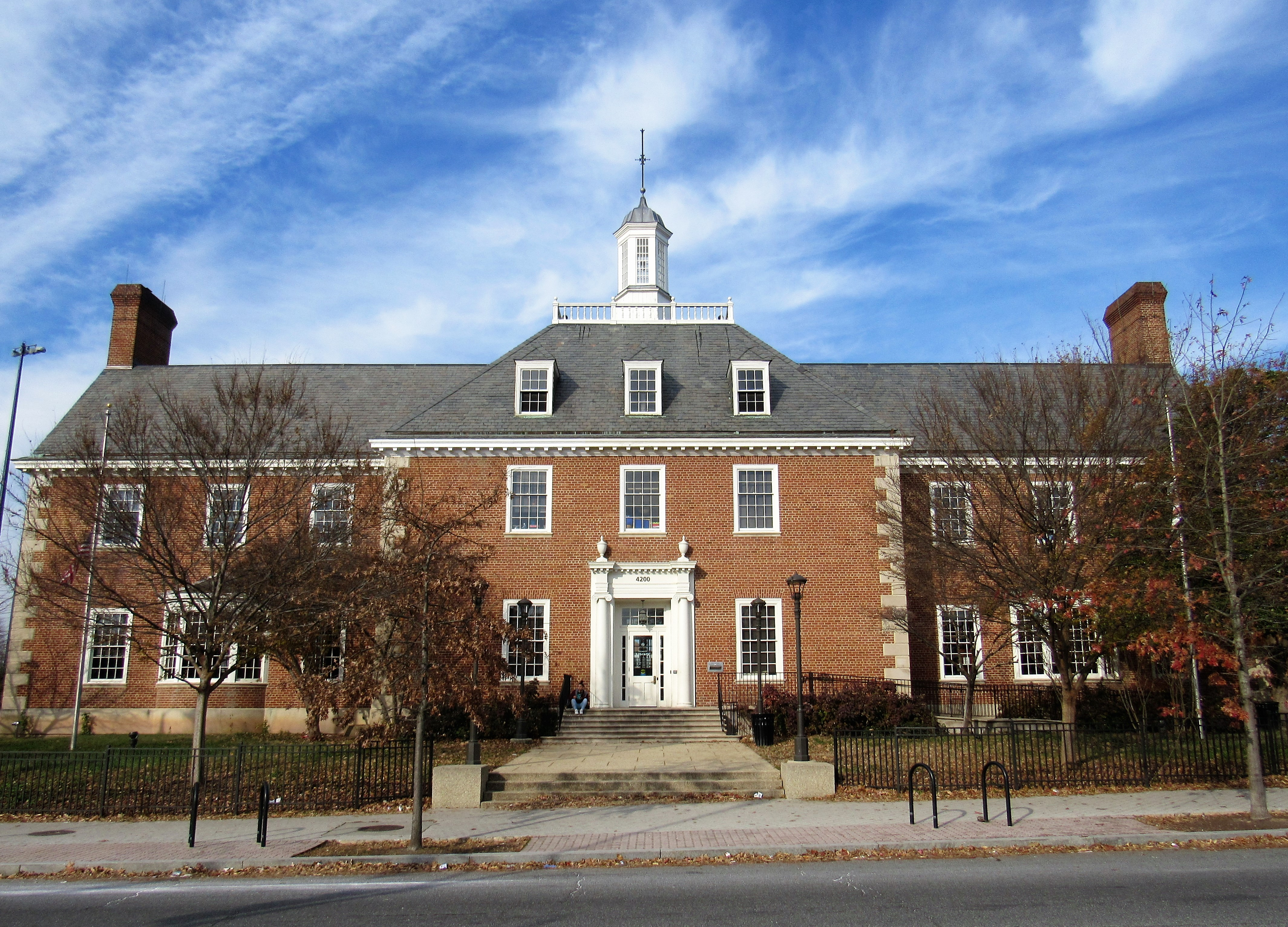
Petworth Library

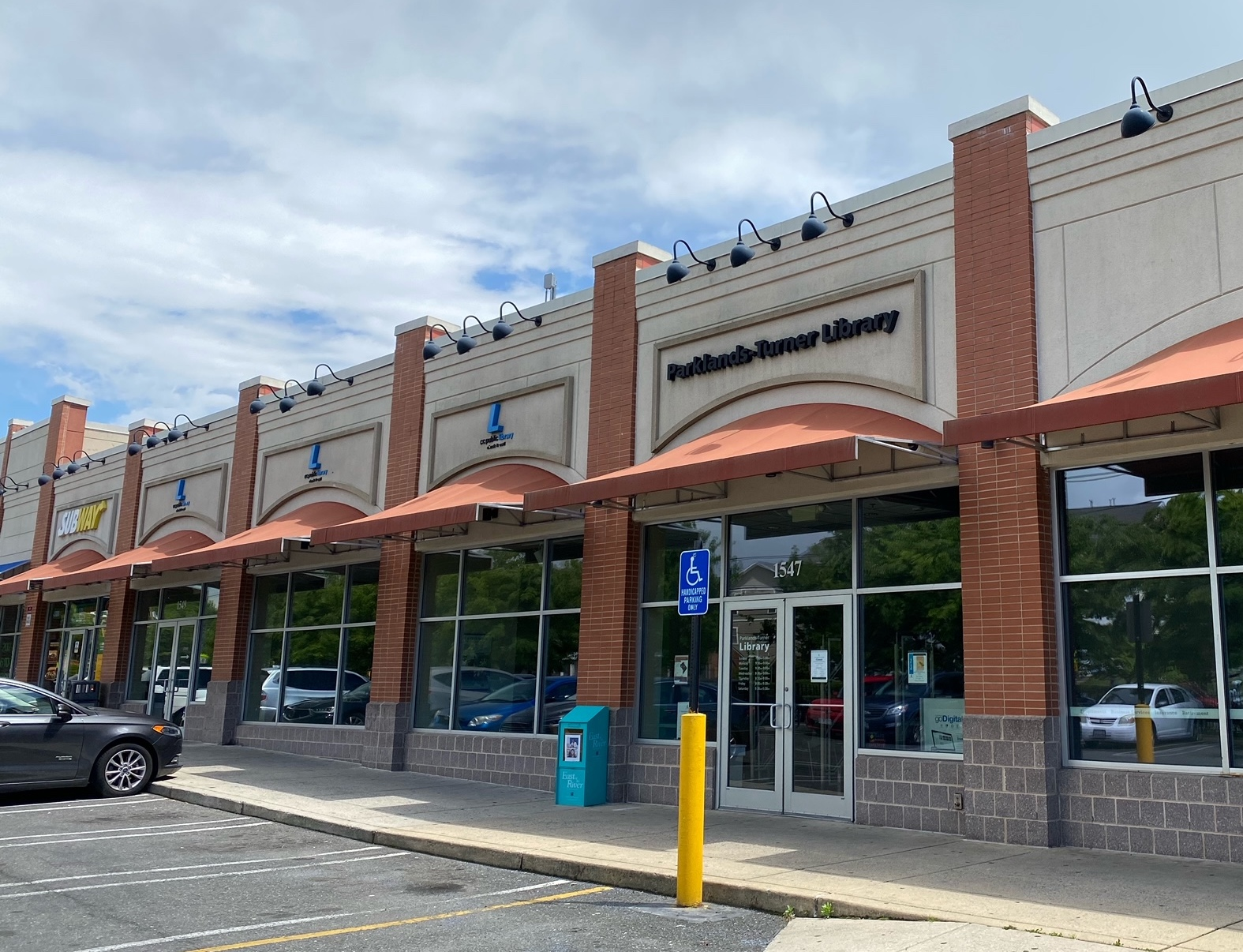
Parklands-Turner Library

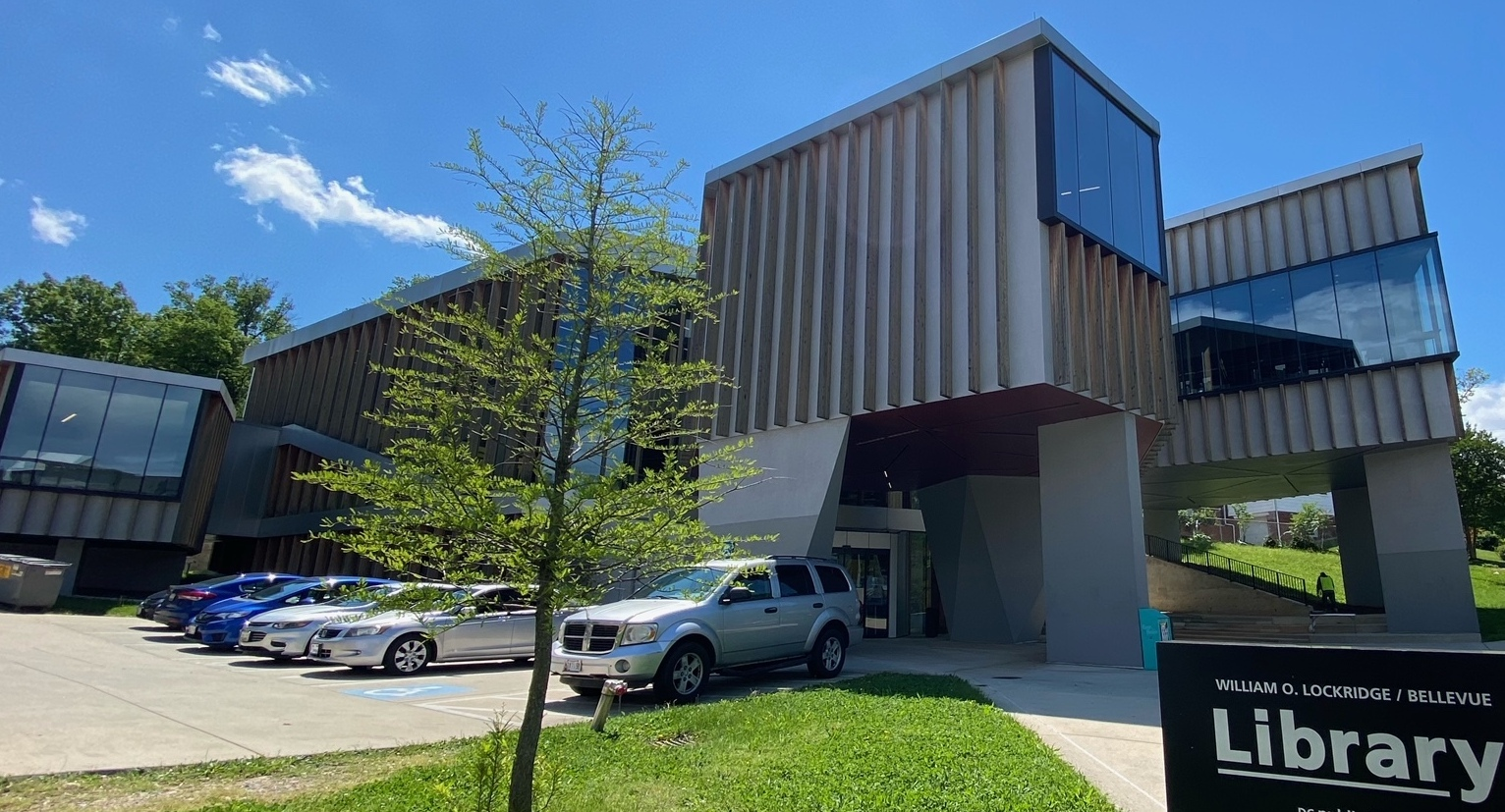
Bellevue / William O. Lockridge Library

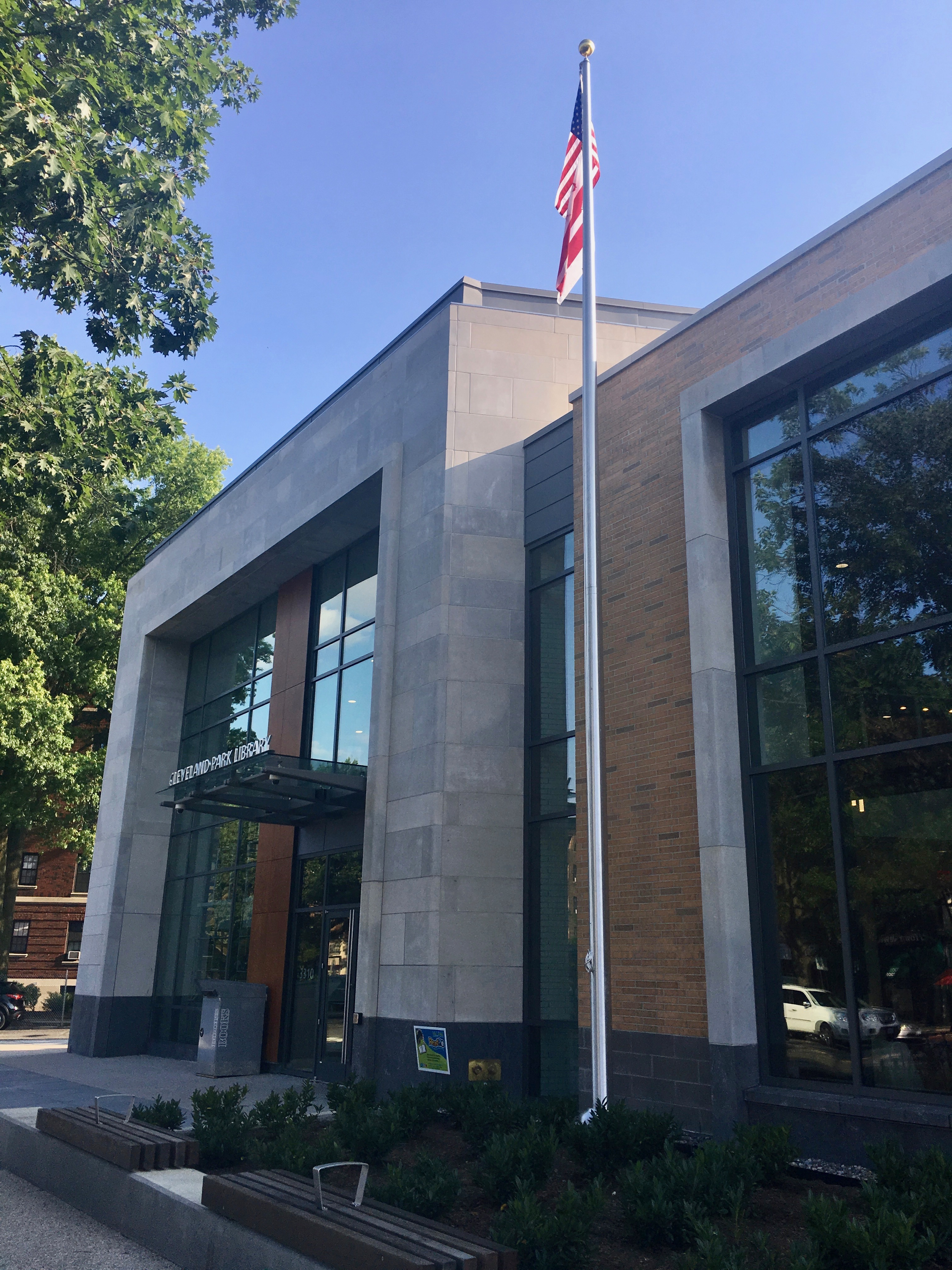
Cleveland Park Library

In addition to the Martin Luther King Jr. Memorial Library — the system's central library — the D.C. Public Library has 26 neighborhood branch library locations throughout the city. It also operates a location at the city's jail.

- Anacostia Neighborhood Library
- Bellevue / William O. Lockridge Library
- Benning / Dorothy I. Height Neighborhood Library
- Capitol View Neighborhood Library
- Chevy Chase Neighborhood Library
- Cleveland Park Neighborhood Library
- Deanwood Neighborhood Library
- Francis A. Gregory Neighborhood Library
- Georgetown Neighborhood Library
- Juanita E. Thornton/Shepherd Park Neighborhood Library
- Lamond-Riggs Neighborhood Library
- Martin Luther King Jr. Memorial Library (DCPL's central library)
- Mount Pleasant Library
- Northeast Neighborhood Library
- Northwest One Library
- Palisades Neighborhood Library
- Parklands-Turner Neighborhood Library
- Petworth Neighborhood Library
- Rosedale Neighborhood Library
- Southeast Neighborhood Library
- Southwest Neighborhood Library
- Takoma Park Neighborhood Library
- Tenley-Friendship Neighborhood Library
- Watha T. Daniel/Shaw Neighborhood Library
- West End Neighborhood Library
- Woodridge Neighborhood Library

== Books from Birth ==
The D.C. Public Library runs a program called Books from Birth. The program is for children aged newborn to 5. All enrolled children receive a book in the mail every month. All children who live in the District are eligible. The program runs in partnership with Imagination Library, a nonprofit run by singer Dolly Parton's Dollywood Foundation. The D.C. program launched in 2016, and as of November 2017, 57 percent of eligible children are enrolled (27,000 children).

== Library cards ==
The District of Columbia Public library issues library cards without charge to D.C. residents, as well as to non-residents who work in, pay property taxes to, or go to school in the District of Columbia. It also will issue them to residents of jurisdictions that reciprocate for District of Columbia residents: Montgomery and Prince George's Counties in Maryland; the cities of Alexandria, Fairfax, and Falls Church; and Arlington, Fairfax, Frederick, Loudoun, and Prince William counties in Virginia. Residents of other areas may obtain a card for $20 a year.

== See also ==
- Culture of Washington, D.C.
- Library of Congress
- Public libraries in Washington, D.C.
- List of Carnegie libraries in Washington, D.C.
