= Chevy Chase Neighborhood Library =

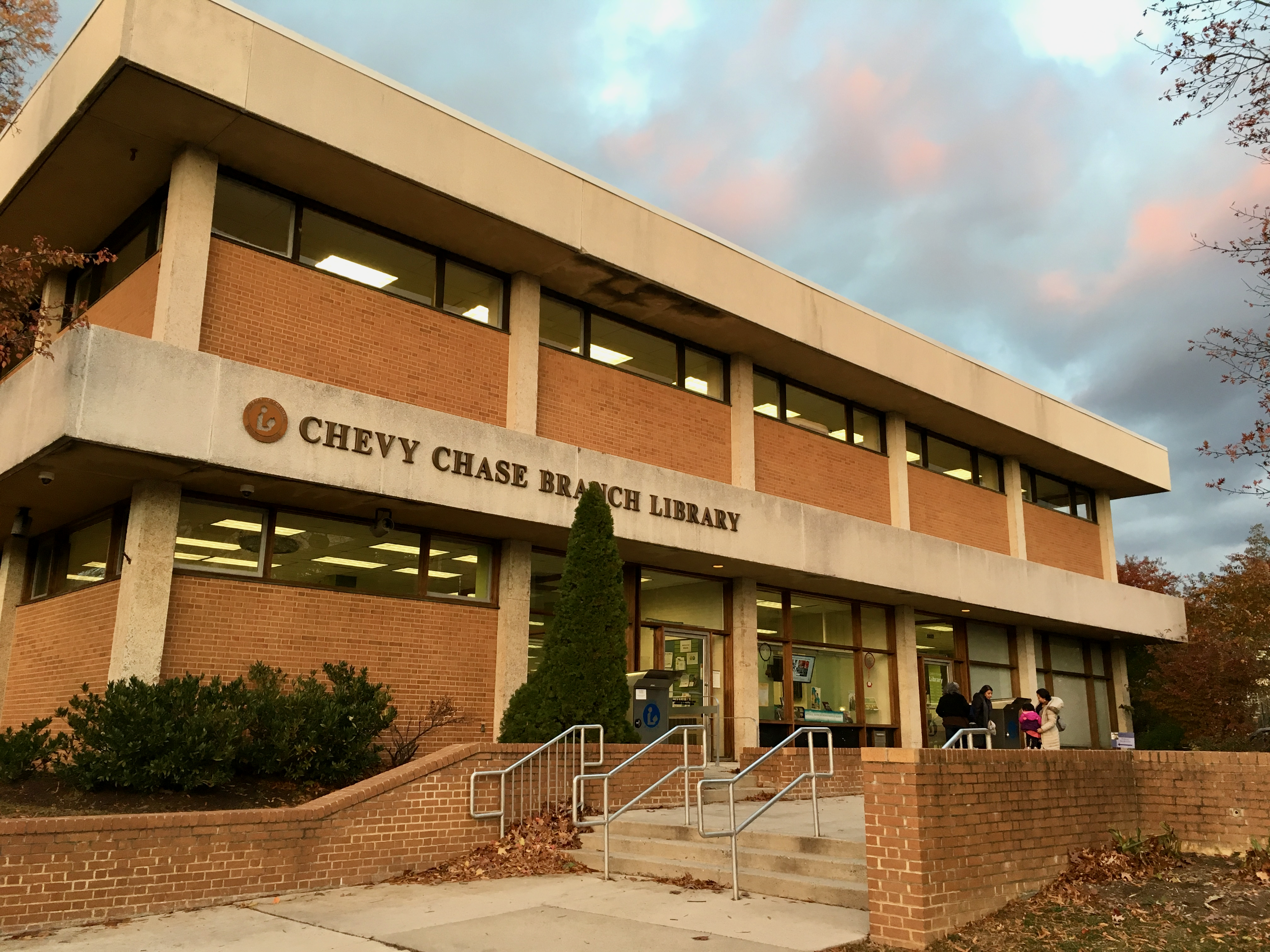
- The library in 2016
- 38.965573°N 77.075578°W
- Location: 5625 Connecticut Ave. NW Washington, DC 20015, United States
- Type: Public library
- Branch of: District of Columbia Public Library

Other information
- Website: https://www.dclibrary.org/chevychase

The Chevy Chase Neighborhood Library is a branch of the District of Columbia Public Library in the Chevy Chase neighborhood of Washington, D.C. It is located at 5625 Connecticut Avenue NW. The neighborhood's first public library opened in 1920 and relocated several times before its current building opened in 1968.
