= Northeast Neighborhood Library =

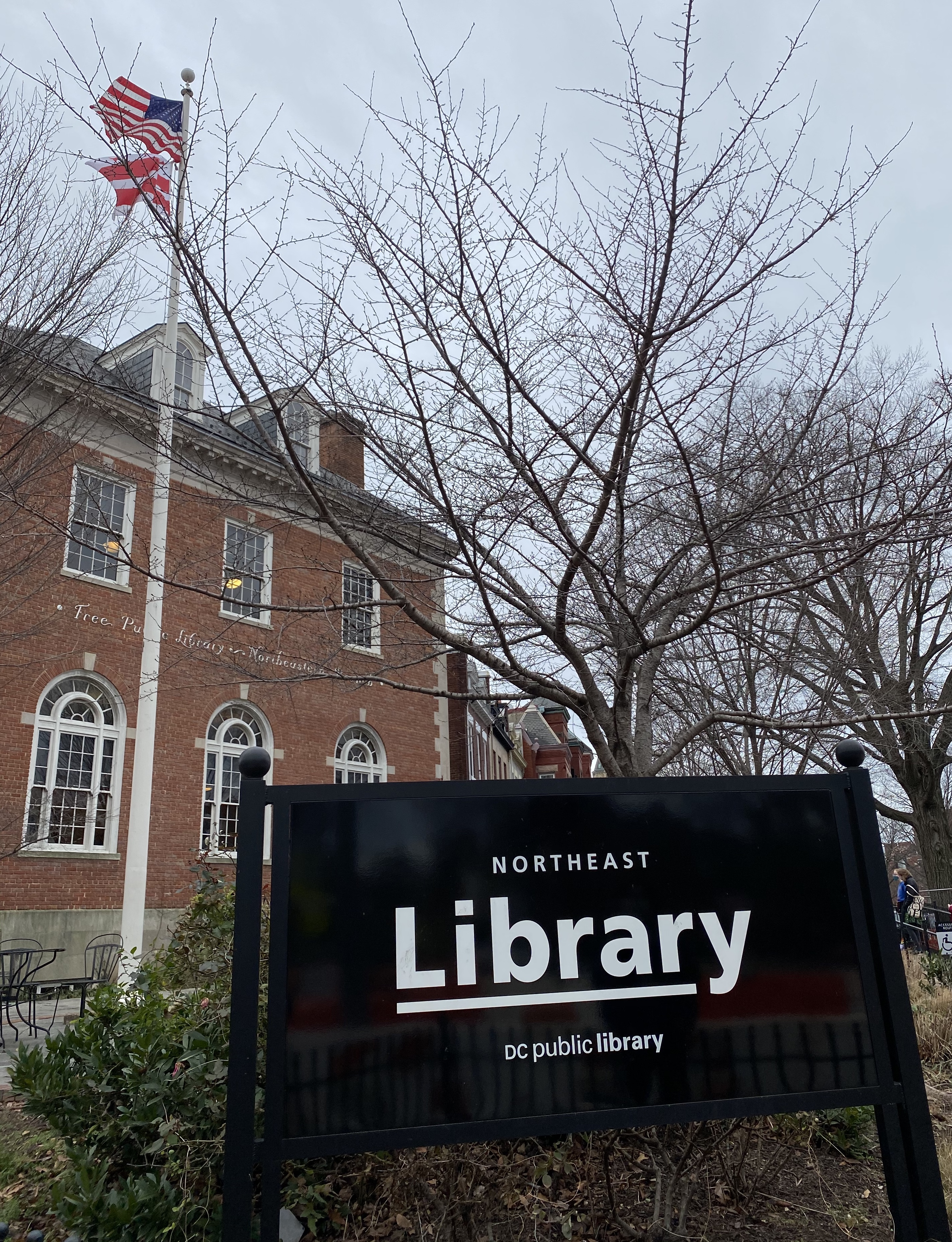
- 38.894435°N 76.996393°W
- Location: 330 7th St. NE Washington, DC 20002, United States
- Type: Public library
- Established: 1932
- Branch of: District of Columbia Public Library

Other information
- Website: https://www.dclibrary.org/northeast

The Northeast Neighborhood Library is a branch of the District of Columbia Public Library in the Capitol Hill neighborhood of Washington, D.C. It is located at 330 7th Street NE. The Georgian Revival-style brick building first opened in 1932 and it reopened in 2014 following a $10 million renovation that preserved its historic interior.

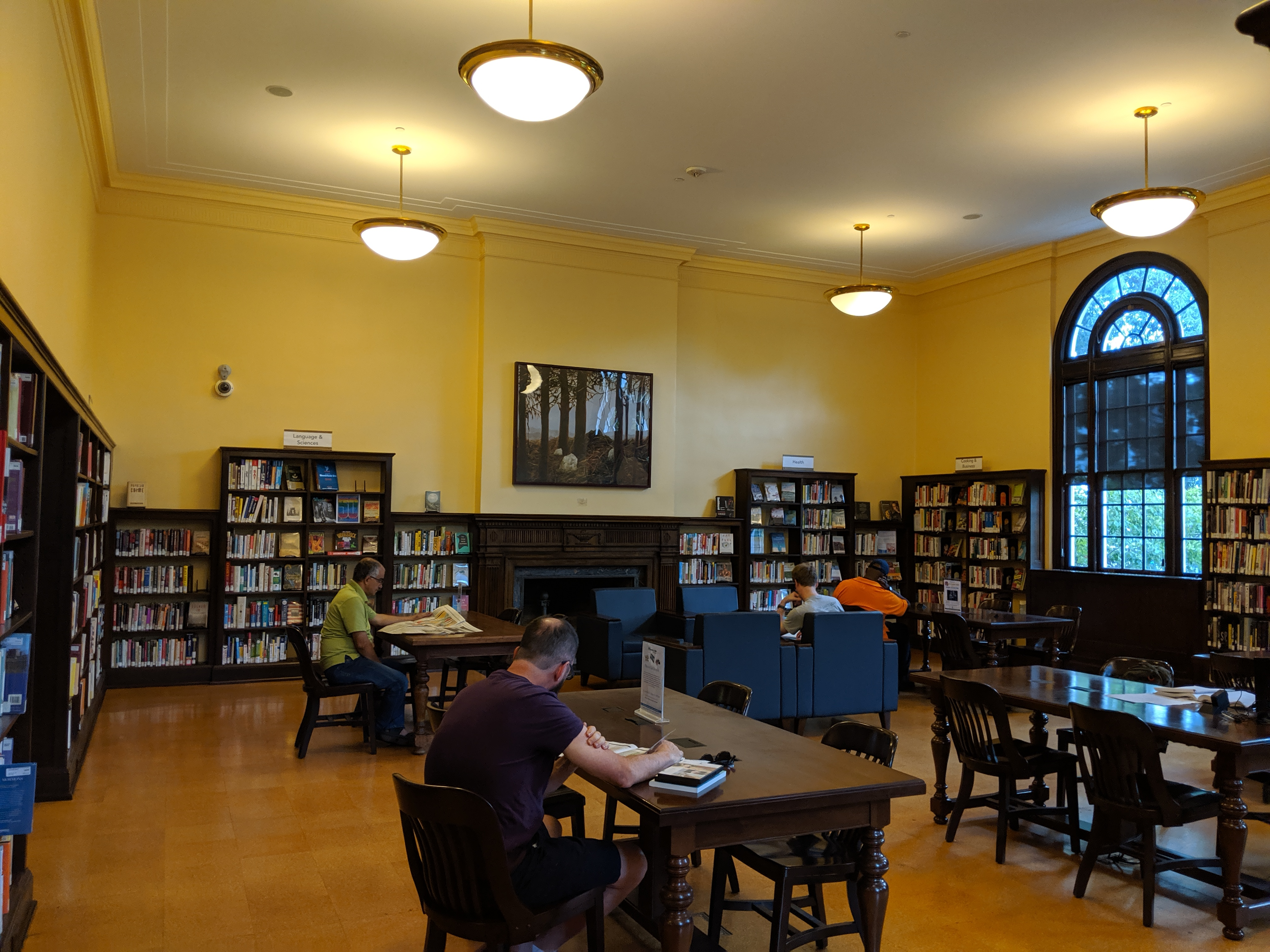
The main reading room
