= Rosedale Neighborhood Library =

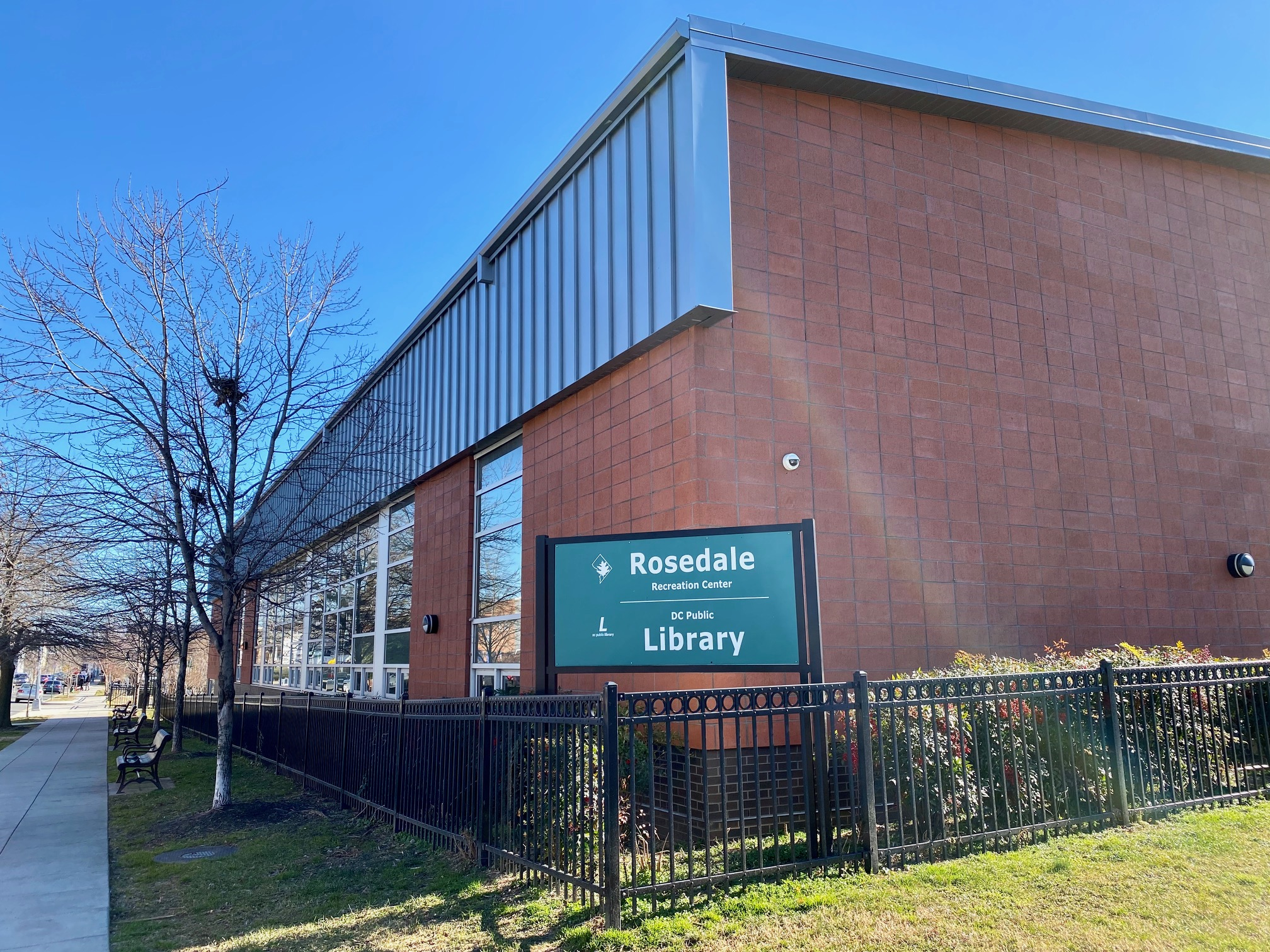
- 38.897504°N 76.978712°W
- Location: 1701 Gales St. NE Washington, DC 20002, United States
- Type: Public library
- Established: 2012
- Branch of: District of Columbia Public Library

The Rosedale Neighborhood Library is a branch of the District of Columbia Public Library in the Kingman Park neighborhood of Washington, D.C. It is located at 1701 Gales Street NE. It opened in 2012 inside a new community center that also includes a gymnasium and a swimming pool. Local residents were reportedly frustrated in the summer of 2019 by frequent closures of the library branch due to high temperatures, the result of a malfunctioning air conditioning system.
