= Parklands-Turner Neighborhood Library =

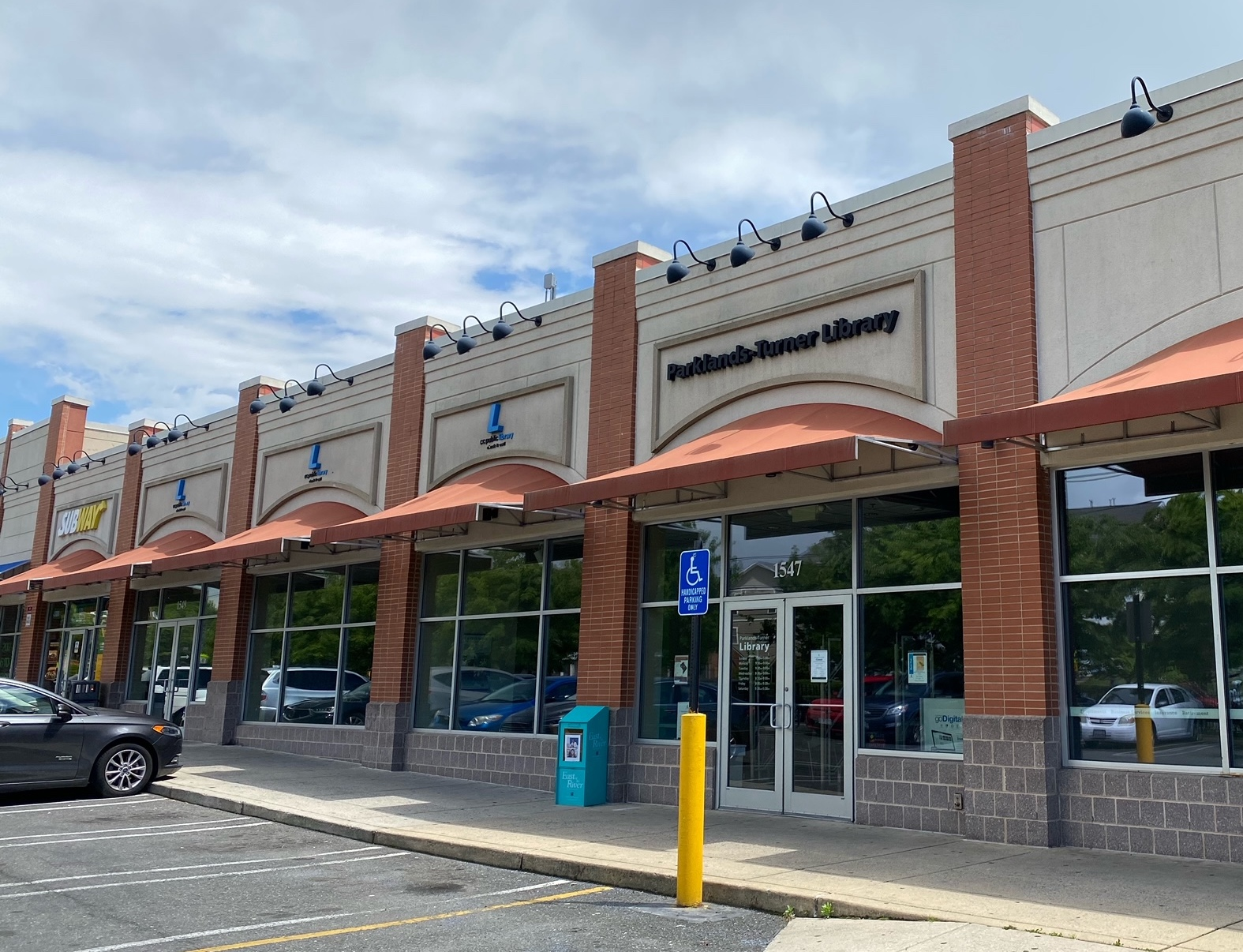
- 38.846294°N 76.981137°W
- Location: 1547 Alabama Ave. SE Washington, DC 20032, United States
- Type: Public library
- Branch of: District of Columbia Public Library

Other information
- Website: https://www.dclibrary.org/parklands

The Parklands-Turner Neighborhood Library is a branch of the District of Columbia Public Library in the Congress Heights neighborhood of Washington, D.C. It is located at 1547 Alabama Avenue SE. A small library kiosk opened in the area in 1976, and a somewhat larger facility opened in 1984, which was eventually replaced in 2009 by a new $878,000 library facility.

The notably small 4,900-square-foot library is located in a leased space in the Shops at Parkland strip mall. In 2019, the library system conducted a study of potential sites for an expanded library in the neighborhood, and the district has budgeted money for the project for fiscal year 2022. The new full-service, 20,000-square-foot plus library is proposed to be built next to the Congress Heights Station at 1290 Alabama Avenue SE.
