= Deanwood Neighborhood Library =

Public library in Washington, D.C., U.S.

Coordinates: 38.908482°N 76.933033°W

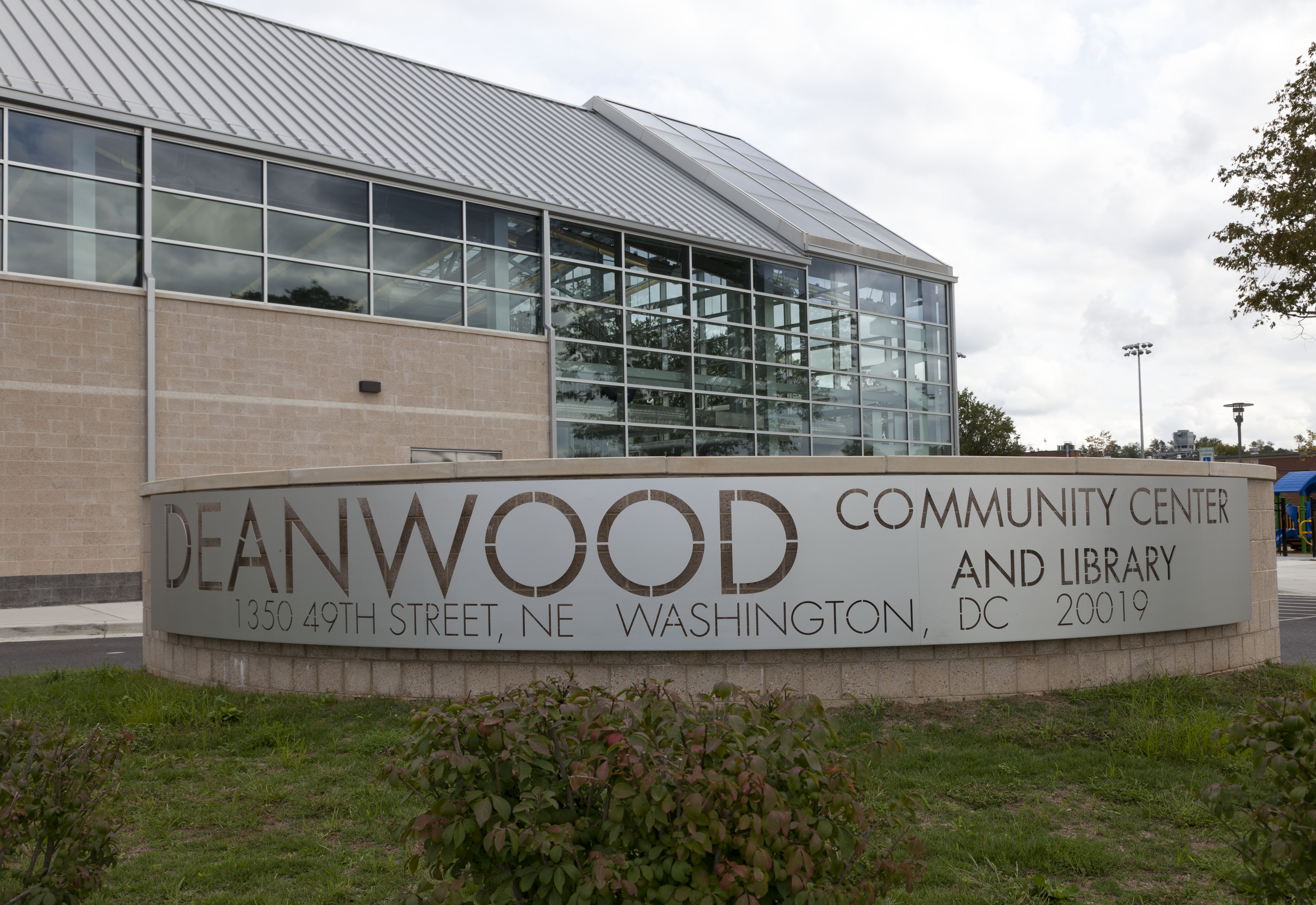
- Location: 1350 49th St. NE Washington, DC 20019, United States
- Type: Public library
- Established: 25 June 2010
- Branch of: District of Columbia Public Library

Other information
- Website: https://www.dclibrary.org/deanwood

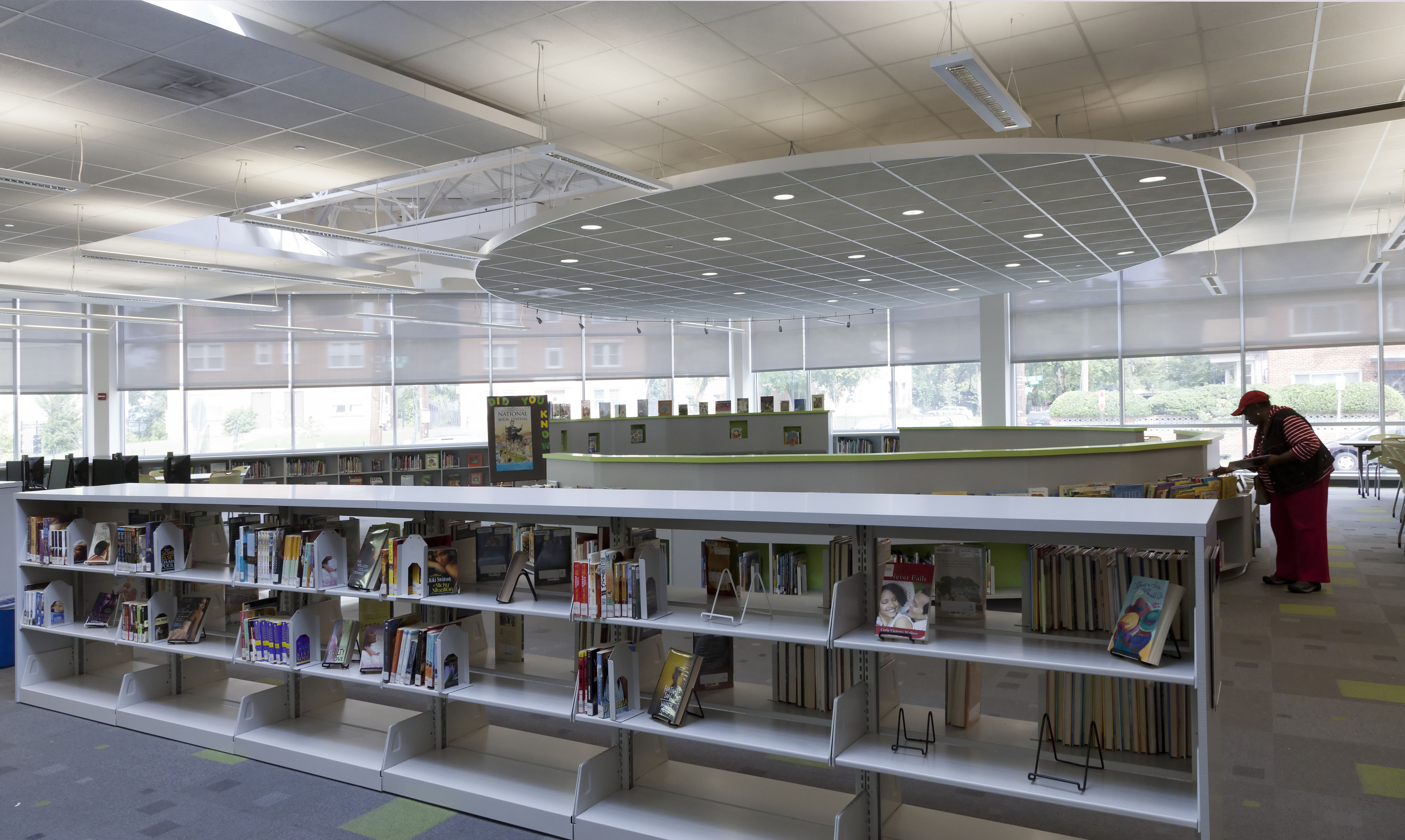
The interior of the Deanwood Neighborhood Library in 2011.

The Deanwood Neighborhood Library is a branch of the District of Columbia Public Library in the Deanwood neighborhood of Washington, D.C. It is located at 1350 49th Street NE, within a community center that opened in July 2010 at a cost of $32 million and also includes a swimming pool, a gym, and facilities for child care and seniors.

Construction on the 63,000-square-foot facility began in December 2008. The library, which occupies 7,500 square feet of the space, has room for 25,000 books. It was designed by Perkins Eastman.

Deanwood, one of the city's most historic African American neighborhoods, was previously served by a library kiosk that opened in 1976. The one-room, 120-square-foot structure held a few thousand books but lacked basic services like running water. Though it has not been operational since 2008, the remains of the kiosk can be seen at 4215 Nannie Helen Burroughs Avenue, NE.

== See also ==
- District of Columbia Public Library
- Deanwood
