= Juanita E. Thornton/Shepherd Park Neighborhood Library =

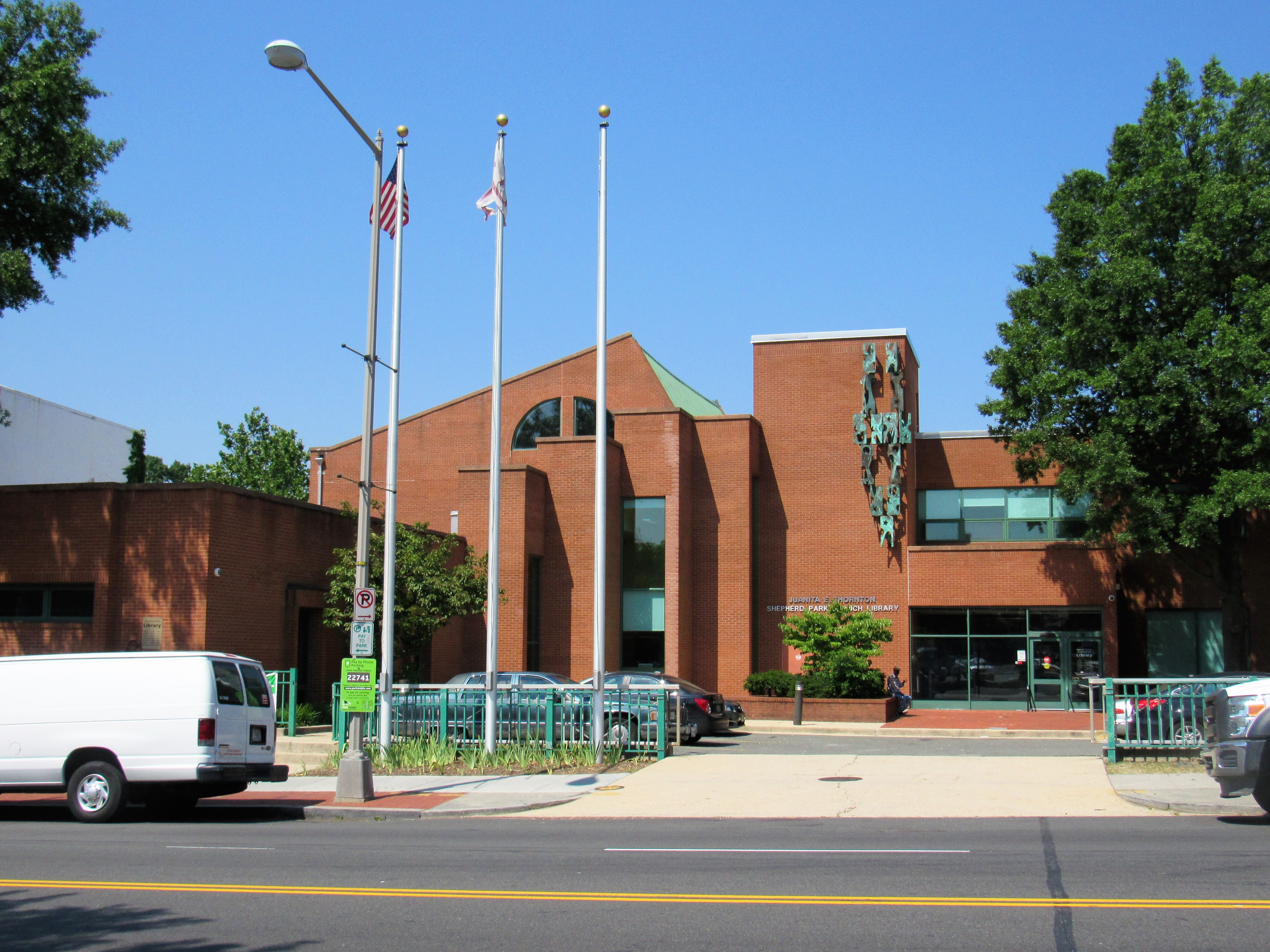
- Location: 7420 Georgia Ave. NW, Washington, D.C. 20012, United States
- Type: Public library
- Established: 1990
- Branch of: District of Columbia Public Library

Other information
- Website: dclibrary.org/thornton

Juanita E. Thornton/Shepherd Park Neighborhood Library is part of the District of Columbia Public Library (DCPL) System. It was opened to the public on July 29, 1990. The library was named in honor of Juanita E. Thornton (December 25, 1912 – September 14, 1990), a teacher and community activist.

== History ==
Before 1990, neighbors living around Shepherd Park in Washington D.C. did not have a library, and they had to walk almost two miles to use the library at Takoma, Washington, D.C. In 1984, an apartment building was razed, and a Wendy's restaurant was scheduled to be constructed on the site. The next day at 6:45 a.m., Juanita E. Thornton, a former teacher with the DC Schools Public System, spoke with Hardy Franklin, at that time Director of the Department of DC Public Libraries, and told him: "We have beef, bread, booze and beer. We need another B: books". A library "would provide good mental health. It is necessary for the growth of our cities, harmony among the races, justice and peace". The slogan for the construction of the new library was "Books Not Burgers." In 1988, the land was turned over to District of Columbia Public Library (DCPL). The new library opened on July 29, 1990 with a collection of 200,000 books, tapes, records, CDs and magazines. The cost of its construction was $3.3 million, and it was designed by the firm Bryant and Bryant.

Juanita E. Thornton died one month after the library opened, on September 14, 1990. In October 1992, the library was named in her honor.

Winnell Montague, a librarian with 20 years of experience, was the first branch librarian.

=== 2015-2016 Makeover ===
Juanita E. Thornton/Shepherd Park Neighborhood Library had a makeover from Autumn 2015 to Spring 2016. The budget for the renovation was $1.1 million.

== See also ==
- District of Columbia Public Library
- Shepherd Park
- Mount Pleasant Library (Washington, D.C.)
