= Palisades Neighborhood Library =

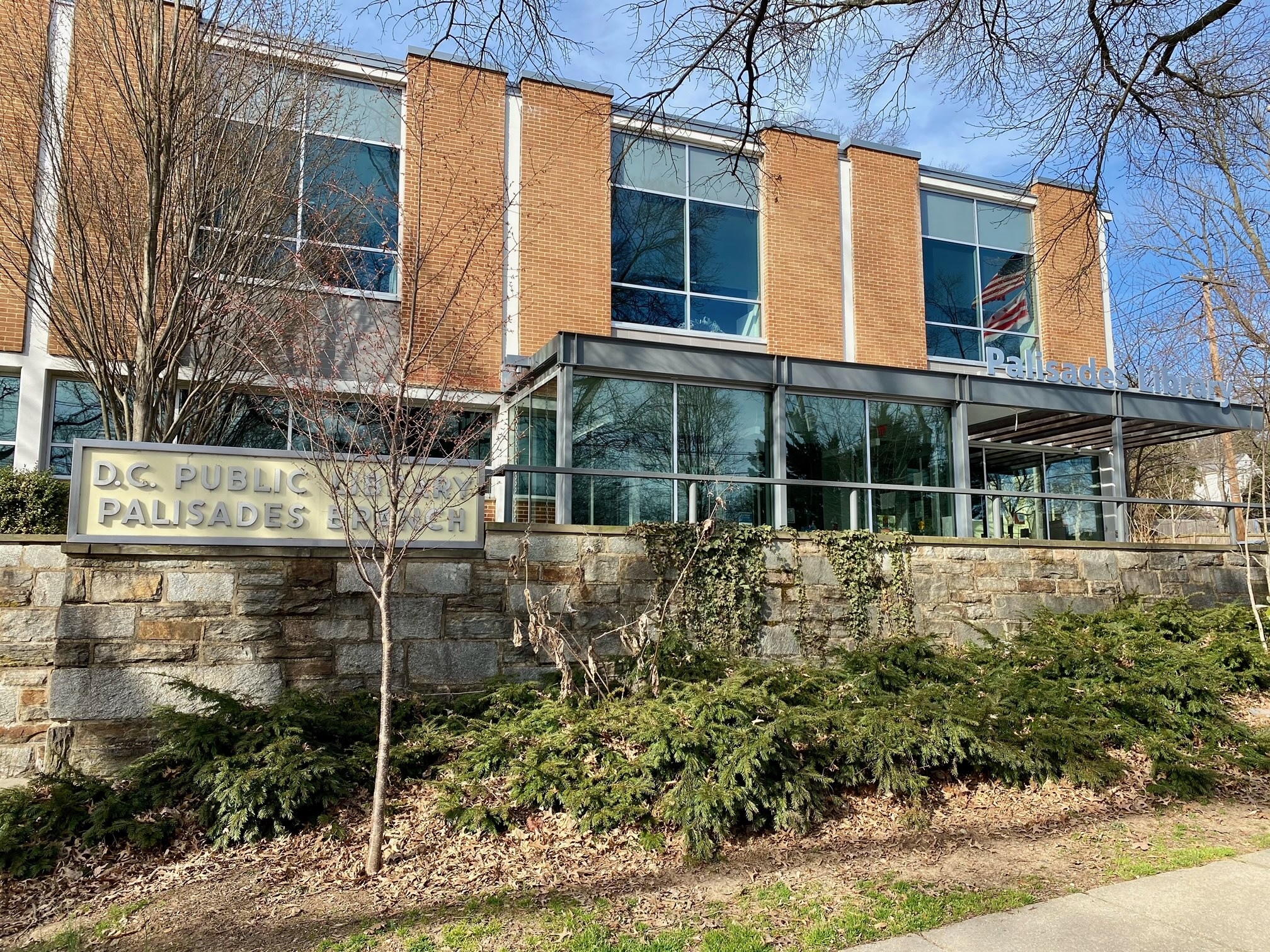
- Palisades Neighborhood Library in 2021
- 38.91837°N 77.09717°W
- Location: 4901 V Street NW; Washington, D.C. 20007, United States
- Type: Public library
- Established: 1964; reopened 2018
- Branch of: District of Columbia Public Library

Other information
- Website: https://www.dclibrary.org/palisades

The Palisades Neighborhood Library is a branch of the District of Columbia Public Library in the Palisades neighborhood of Washington, D.C. It is located at 4901 V Street NW. A small sub-branch library opened in the neighborhood in 1928 and the current building opened in 1964, with a $8.2 million renovation completed in 2018.
