= Takoma Park Neighborhood Library =

Branch of District of Columbia Public Library

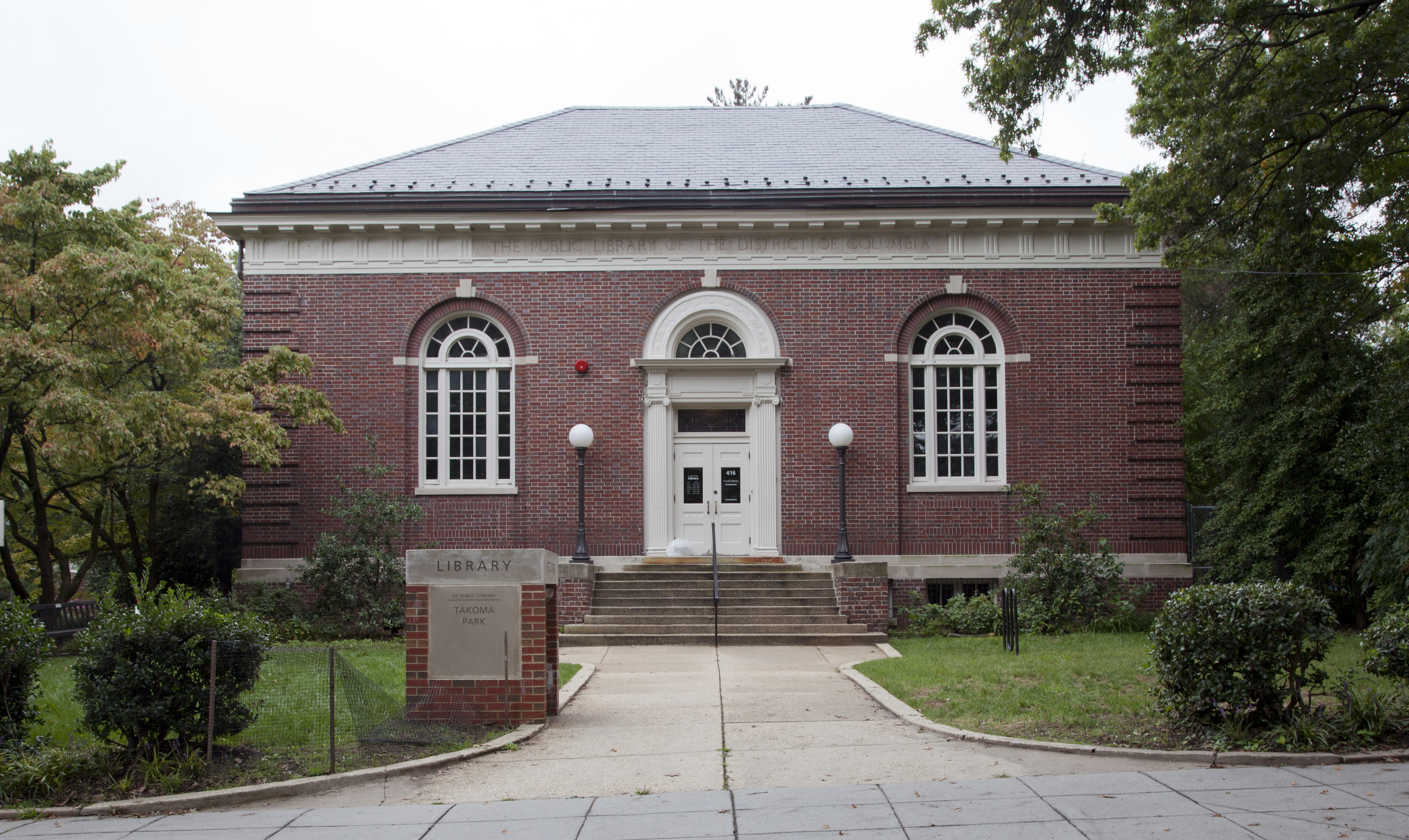
- 38.9745°N 77.0202°W
- Location: 416 Cedar St. N.W., Washington, D.C. 20012, United States
- Type: Public library
- Established: 1911
- Branch of: District of Columbia Public Library

Other information
- Website: dclibrary.org/takomapark

The Takoma Park Neighborhood Library is a branch of the District of Columbia Public Library (DCPL) System that serves the Takoma neighborhood. It opened in 1911.

== History ==
Interior of the library

Before the current public library opened in 1911, the community was served by the Takoma Club and Library, a small lending library that opened on May 1, 1900, on Oak Avenue, across from the Baltimore and Ohio Railroad station.

The current Takoma Park Branch was built at 416 Cedar Street NW using a $40,000 gift from Andrew Carnegie. It was the first neighborhood branch library in Washington, D.C., and is one of four Carnegie-funded libraries in the city.

The library stands in the Takoma Park National Register Historic District designated in 1983. The building received an extensive makeover in 2009.

== See also ==
- District of Columbia Public Library
- List of Carnegie libraries in Washington, D.C.
- Takoma Park, Washington, D.C.
