= Southeast Neighborhood Library =

Library in Washington, D.C.

- The Southeast Neighborhood Library in 2026
- 38.884076°N 76.996392°W
- Location: 403 7th St. SE Washington, DC 20003, United States
- Type: Public library
- Branch of: District of Columbia Public Library

Other information
- Website: https://www.dclibrary.org/southeast

The Southeast Neighborhood Library is a branch of the District of Columbia Public Library in the Capitol Hill neighborhood of Washington, D.C. It is located at 403 7th Street SE.

Designed by architect Edward Lippincott Tilton in the Neoclassical style, it opened in 1922 and is one of three Carnegie-funded neighborhood libraries in Washington. The building was listed on the National Register of Historic Places in 2021.

== Renovation ==
As of 2019, the city planned a $23.5 million renovation of the library starting in 2021. In 2023, it was announced that the library would close until at least through 2026 as part of the ongoing renovation. The library reopened in September 2026 after the renovation, which ultimately cost $41 million, was completed. The project doubled the building's footprint, mostly through belowground construction, and added a fully accessible entrance.

The new accessible entrance of the Southeast Neighborhood Library.

The interior on the top floor of the library, which was renovated to increase the amount of natural light inside.

The new children's room on the basement level.

== See also ==
- List of Carnegie libraries in Washington, D.C.
- National Register of Historic Places listings in Southeast Quadrant, Washington, D.C.
