= West End Neighborhood Library =

Public library in Washington, District of Columbia, United States

Coordinates: 38.903896°N 77.050579°W

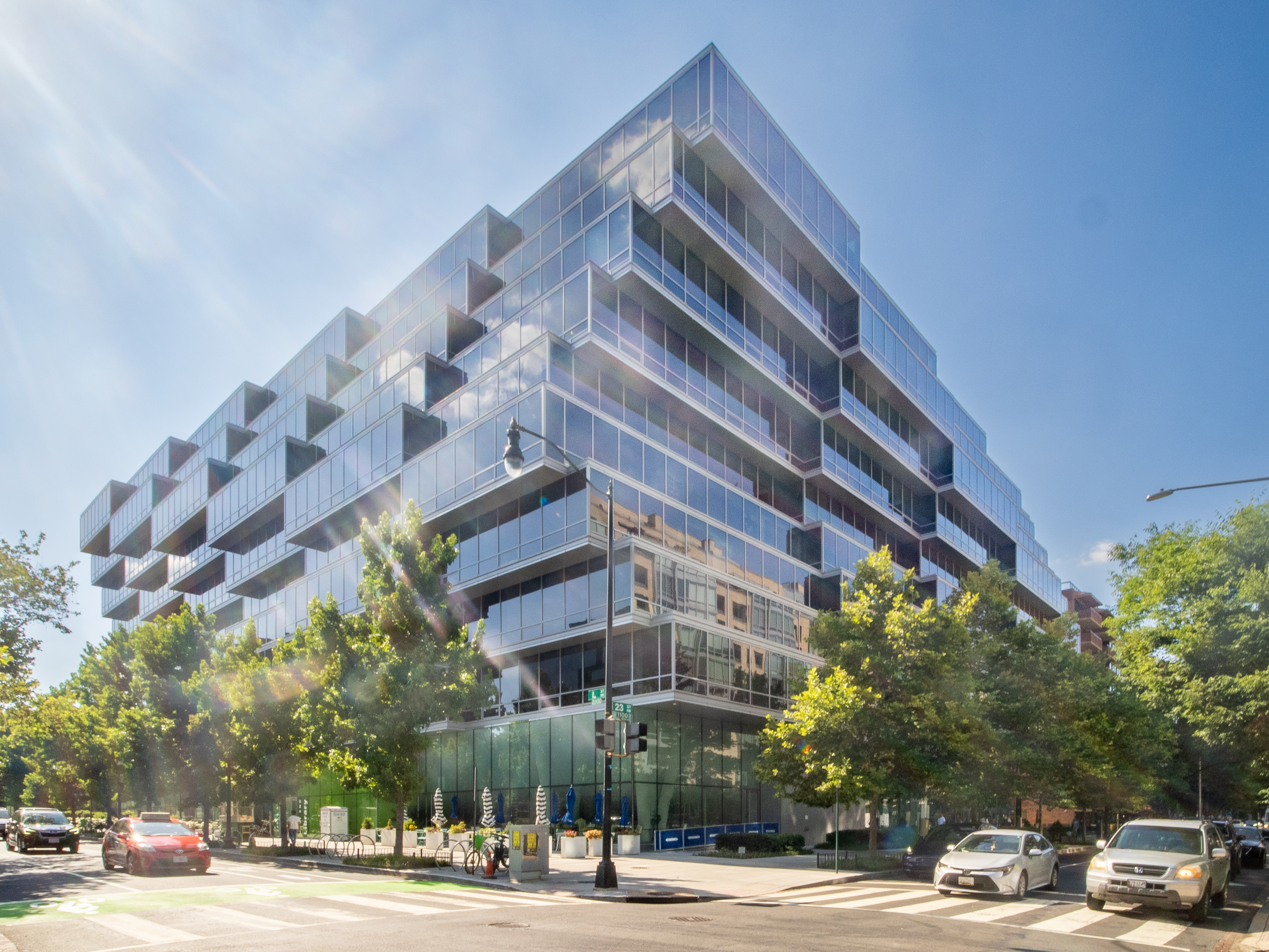
- The library is on ground floor of Westlight building in 2024
- Location: 2301 L St. NW, Washington, DC 20037, United States
- Type: Public library
- Established: 1967
- Branch of: District of Columbia Public Library

Other information
- Website: www.dclibrary.org/westend

The West End Neighborhood Library is a branch of the District of Columbia Public Library in the West End neighborhood of Washington, D.C. It is located at 2301 L Street NW. The library opened in 1967 at 1101 24th Street NW and was the city's first public library branch to offer air conditioning.

== Buildings ==
The library opened on February 24, 1967 in a two-story, brick and concrete building designed by architects Albert Goenner and Associates. The 20,000-square-foot building was the 10th of 11 branches erected under the District's Public Works Program that began in 1955.

The current building for the library opened in 2017 as part of a mixed-use development project designed by architect Enrique Norton.

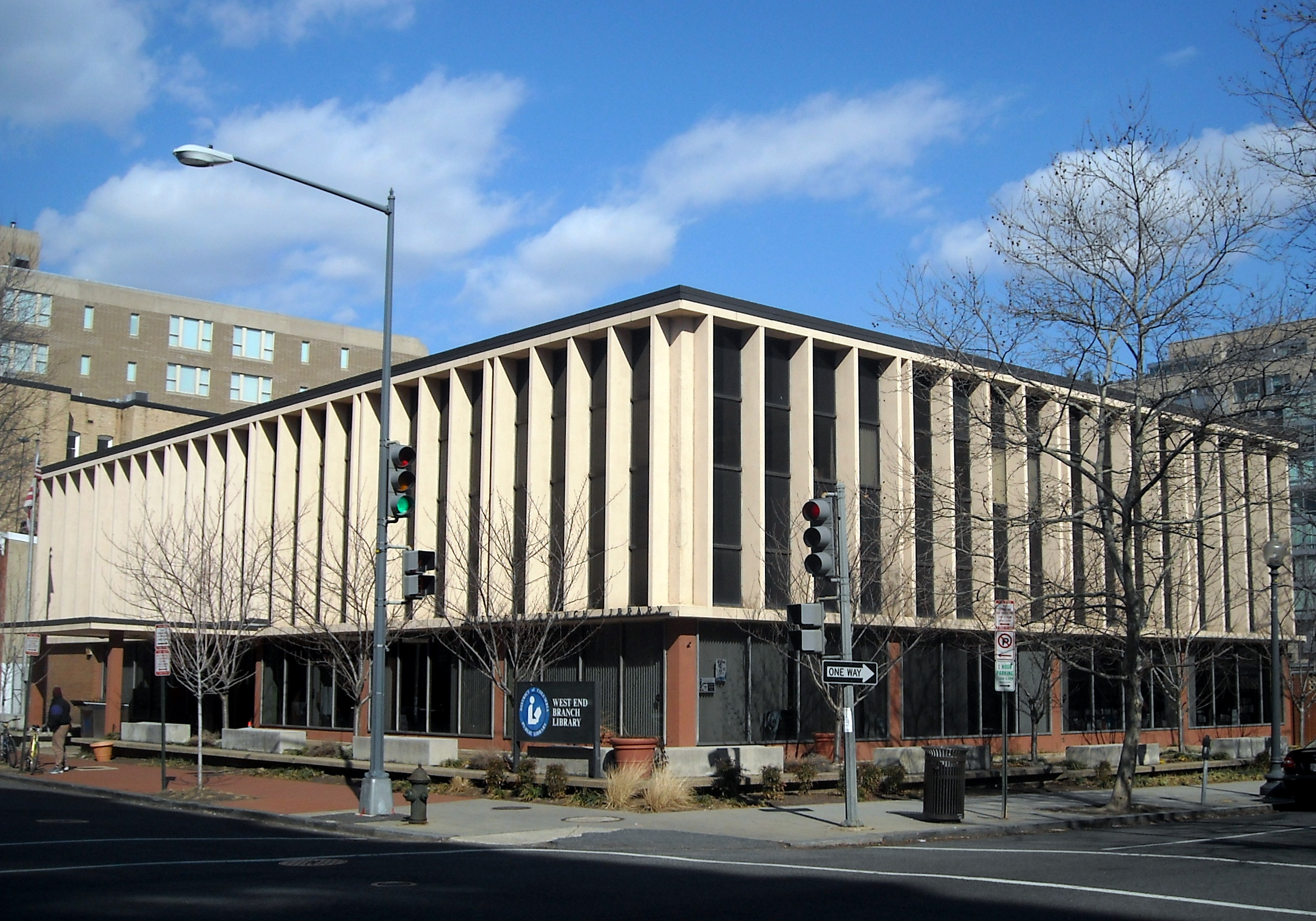
The former building in 2009

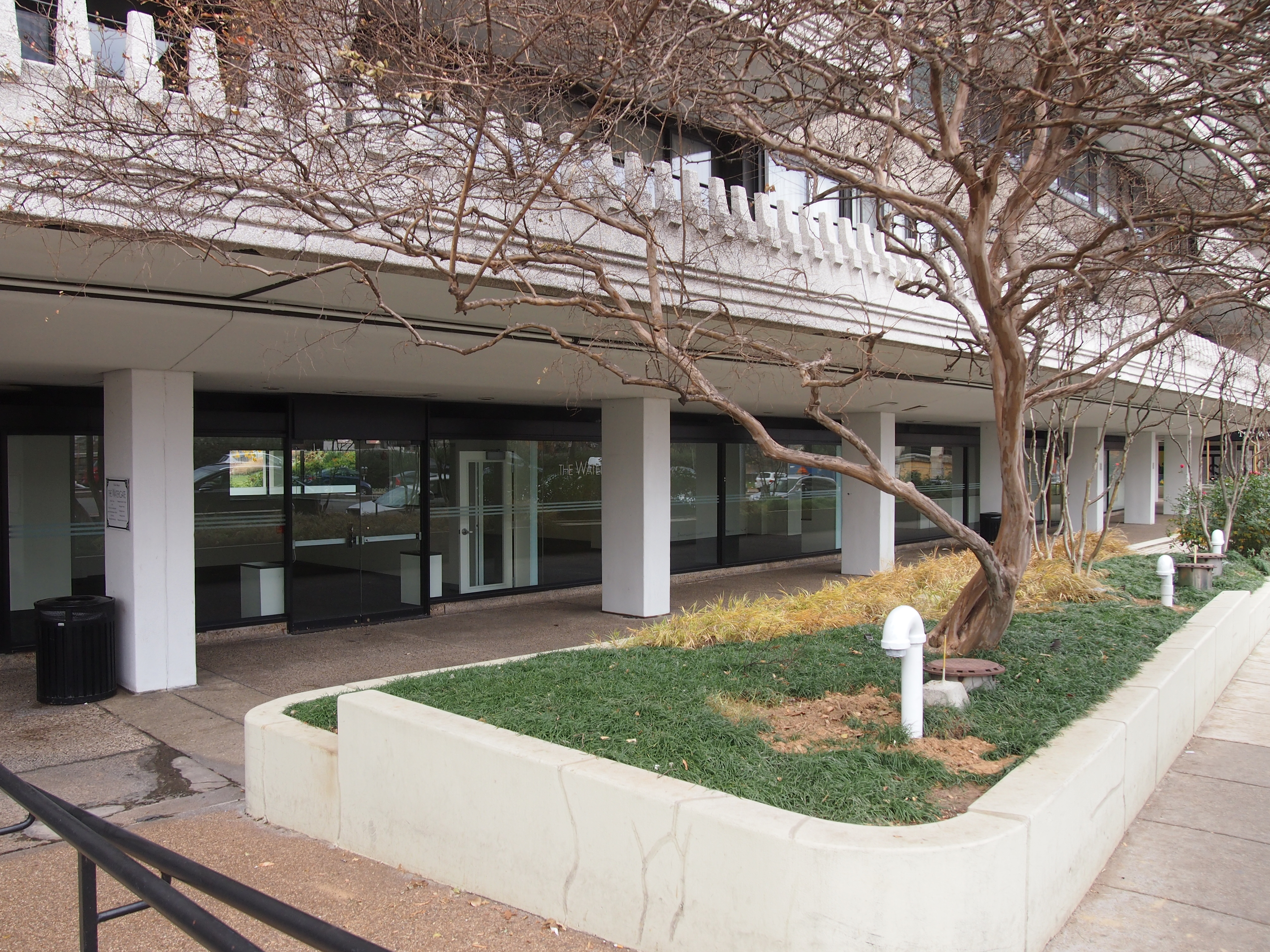
The library's temporary location in the Watergate complex in 2017

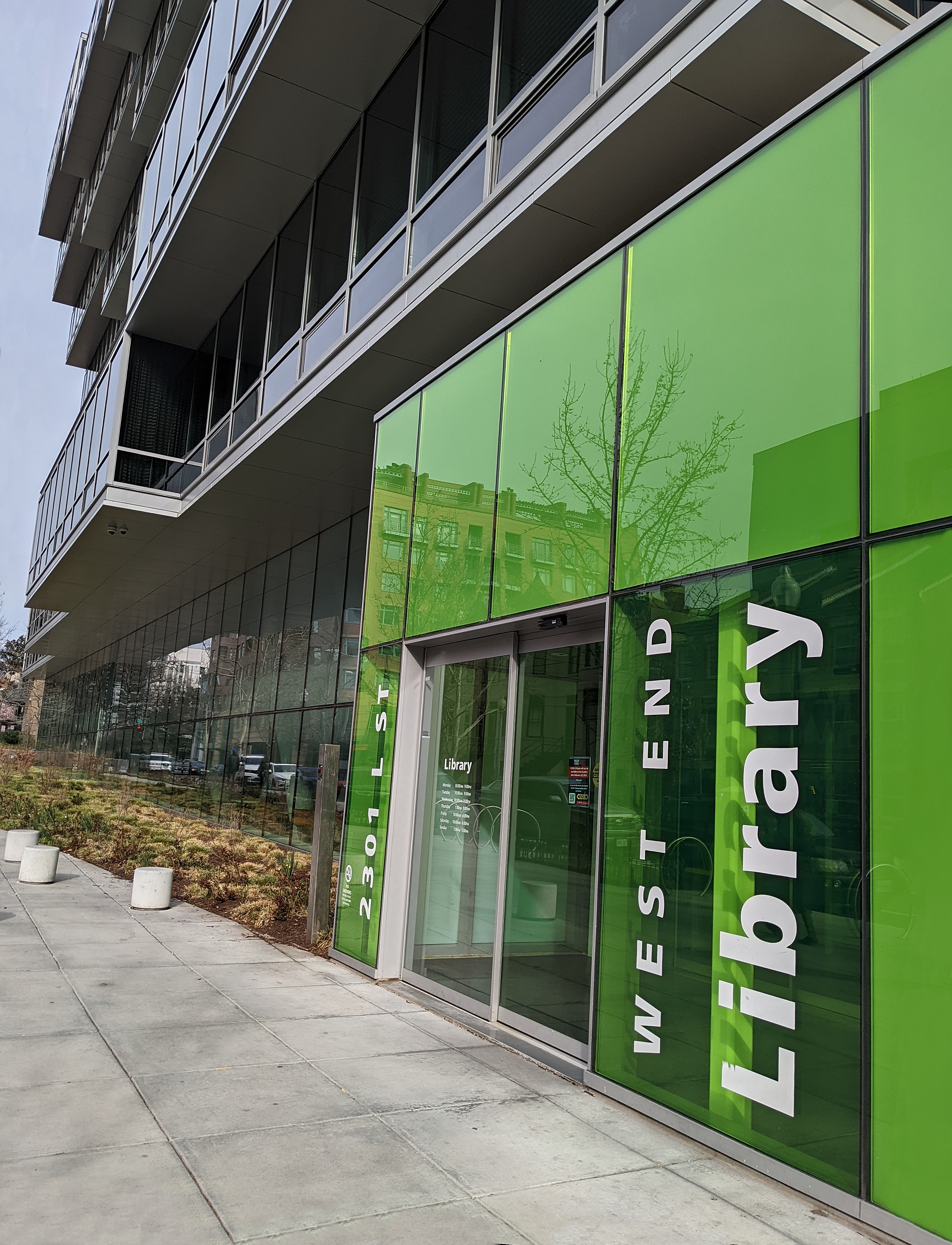
Entrance in 2023
