= Northwest One Library =

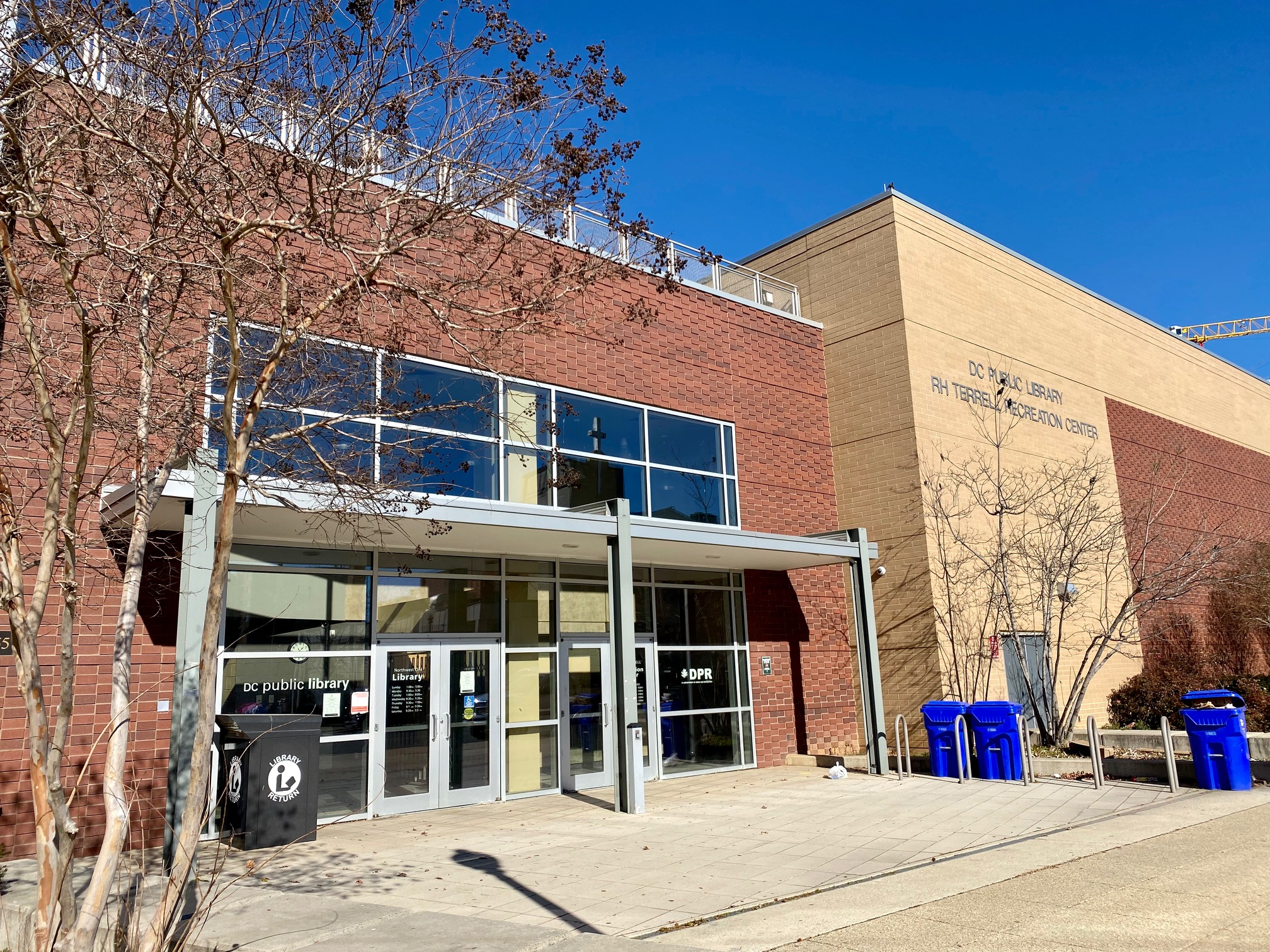
- 38°54′14.1″N 77°0′48″W
- Location: 155 L St N.W., Washington, D.C. 20001, United States
- Type: Public library
- Branch of: District of Columbia Public Library

Other information
- Website: dclibrary.org/northwest

The Northwest One Library is part of the District of Columbia Public Library (DCPL) System. It was originally opened to the public in December 2009.

== History ==
The library was built as part of a collaborative project with the DC Public Schools (Walker-Jones Educational Center), Department of Parks and Recreation and the Office of the Deputy Mayor for Planning and Economic Development. The Northwest One development project produced a state‐of‐the‐art facility including a Preschool‐8th grade school, a public library and a technology center.

The neighborhood had previously been served by a kiosk library until it was closed in 2008. The kiosk, a plexiglass and metal booth approximately 1,400 square feet in size, was built in the late 1970s. It was intended to last only seven years.

== See also ==
- Sursum Corda, Washington, D.C.
