= Anacostia Neighborhood Library =

Public library in Washington D.C.

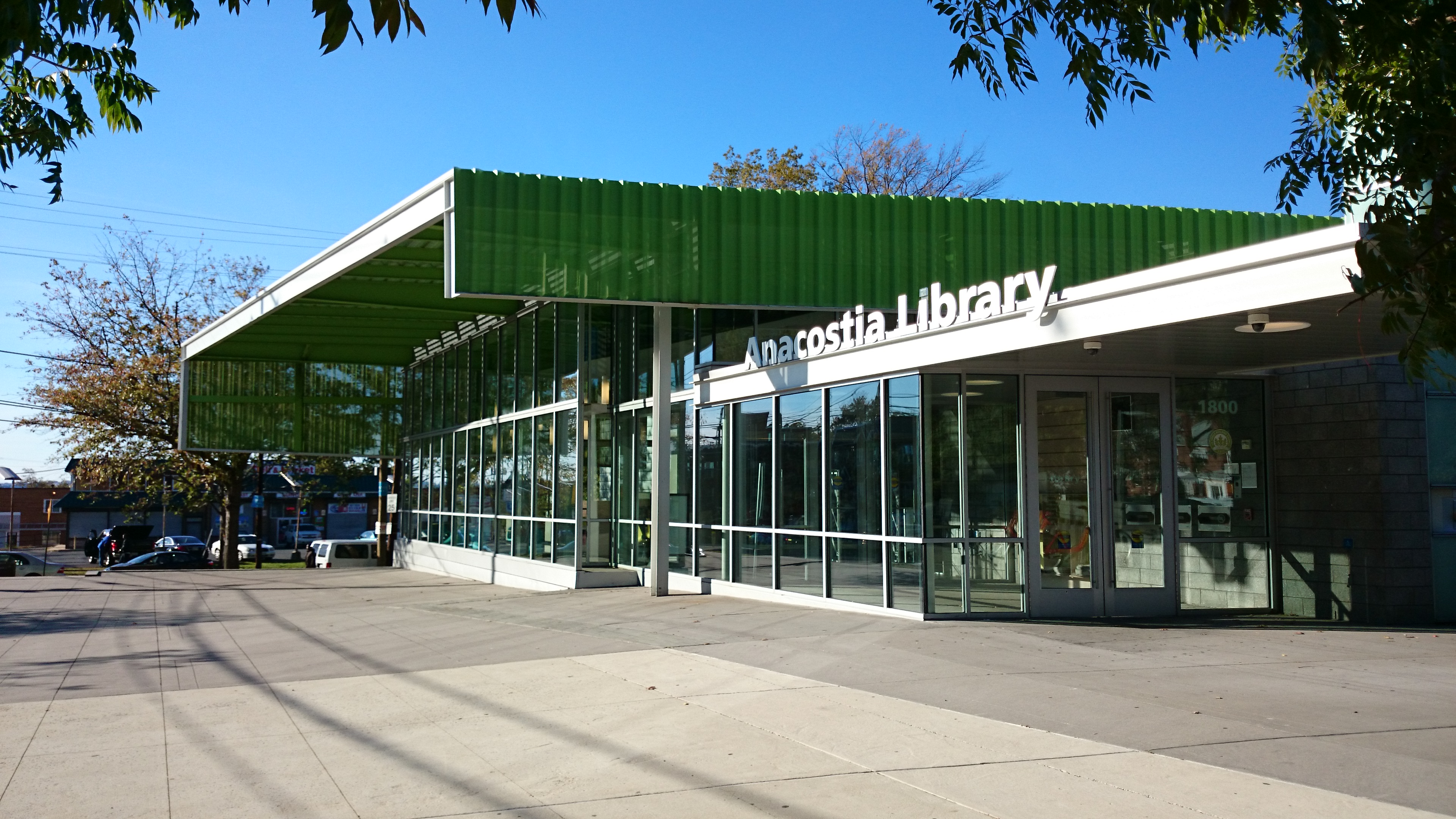
- 38.86602°N 76.97849°W
- Location: 1800 Good Hope Road SE, Washington, D.C. 20020, United States
- Type: Public library
- Established: 1942
- Branch of: District of Columbia Public Library

Other information

Anacostia Neighborhood Library is part of the District of Columbia Public Library (DCPL) System. It was opened to the public in 1942.

== History ==
A temporary branch opened on November 20, 1942, at 1537 Good Hope Road S.E. The building was a former store and apartment building. A new Branch opened in 1956 and the permanent building opened on April 12, 1956. The Anacostia library was the first of six public library branches built under the D.C. Public Works Program. The building was razed and replaced by a new branch library that opened to the public on Monday, April 26, 2010. The library earned a LEED-Gold certification for environmentally sustainable design from the U.S. Green Building Council.

== See also ==
- District of Columbia Public Library
- Anacostia
