= Southwest Neighborhood Library =

Public branch library in Washington, D.C.

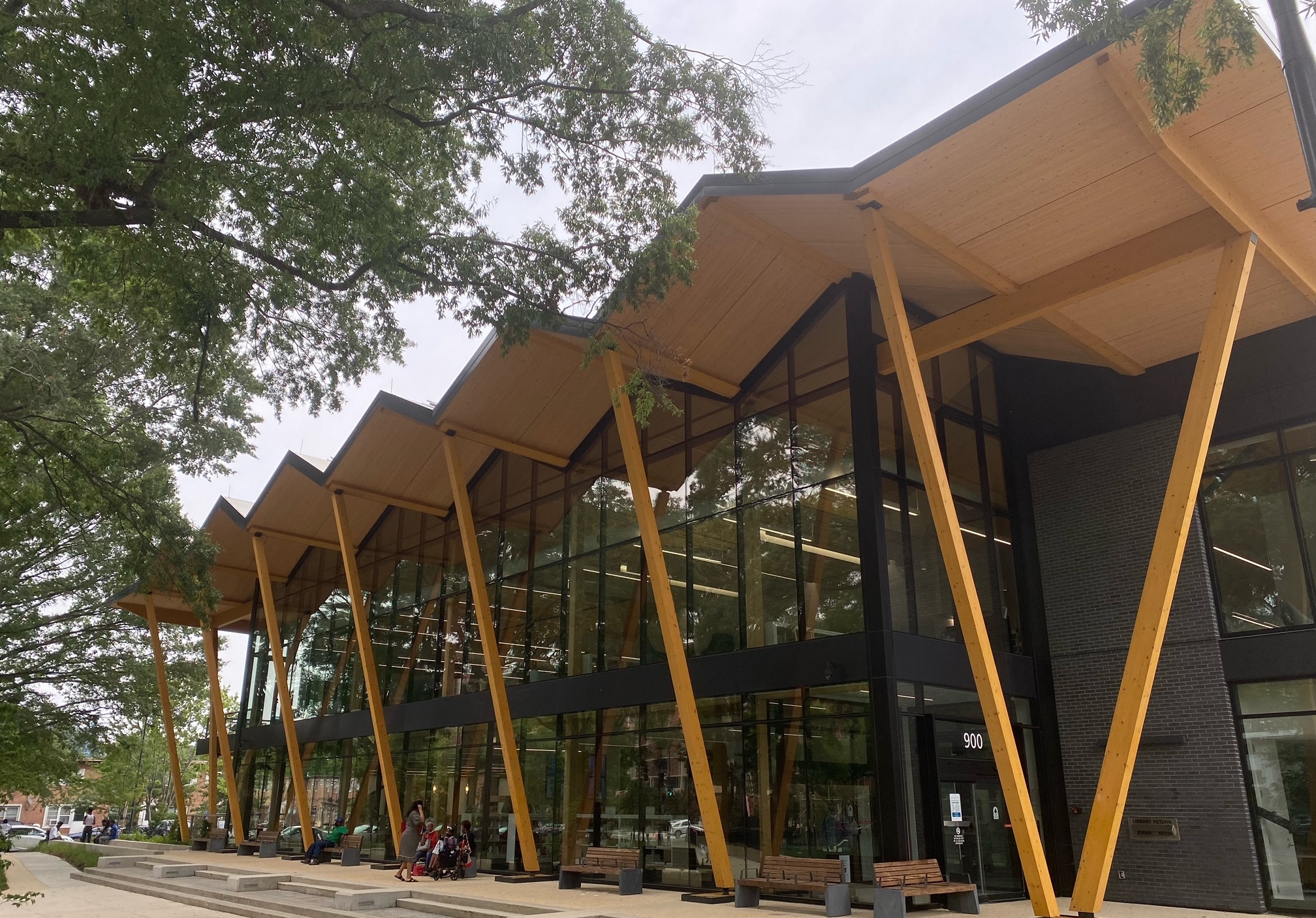
- The new library in 2021.
- 38.878692°N 77.015980°W
- Location: 900 Wesley Place SW, Washington, DC 20024, United States
- Type: Public library
- Branch of: District of Columbia Public Library

Other information
- Website: https://www.dclibrary.org/southwest

The Southwest Neighborhood Library is a branch of the District of Columbia Public Library in the Southwest Waterfront neighborhood of Washington, D.C. It is located at 900 Wesley Place SW.

== History ==
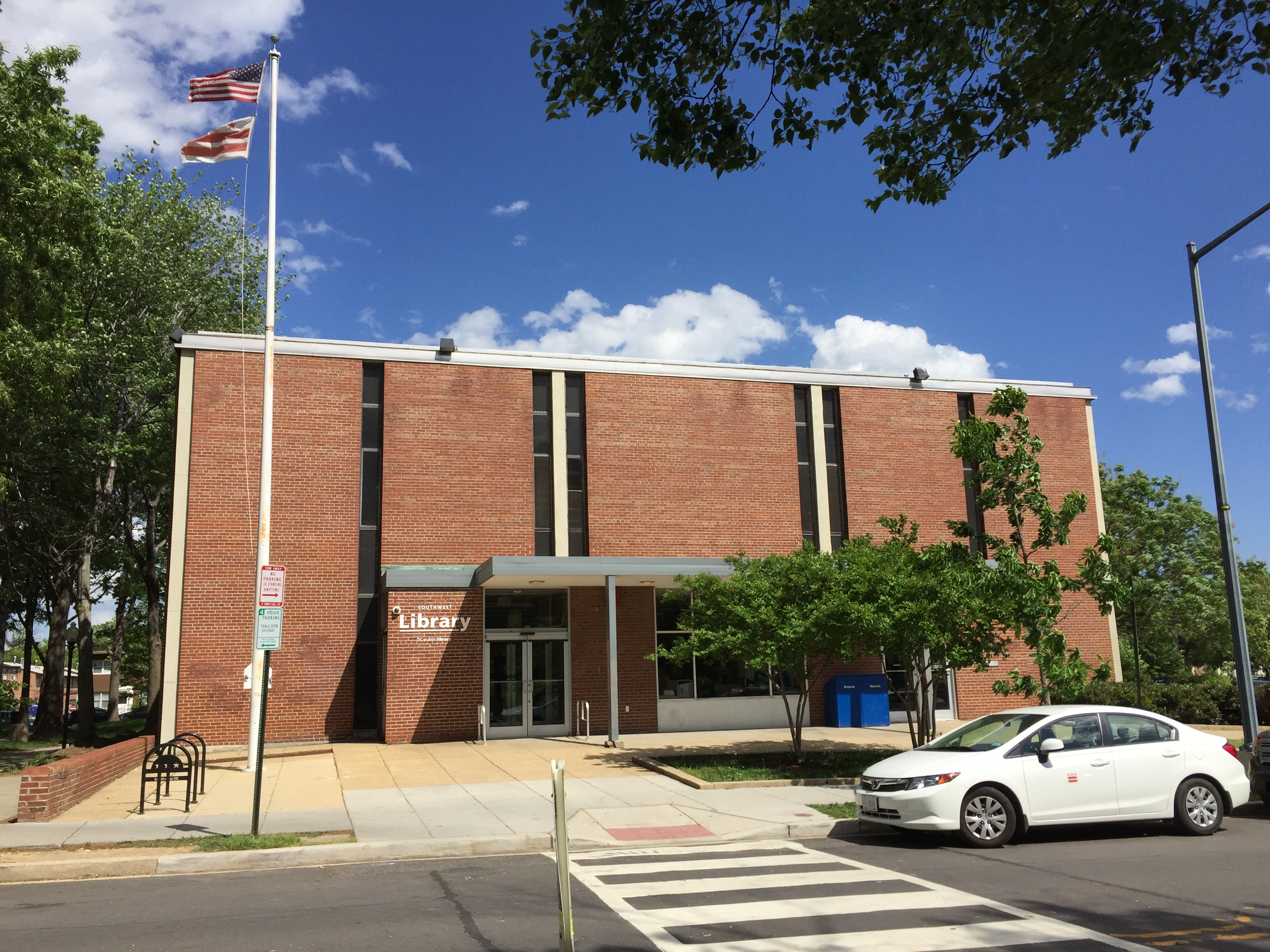
The exterior of the library in 2017.

The library first opened in 1940 as part of the then-new Thomas Jefferson Memorial Junior High School, a Georgian Revival-style building designed by architect Nathan C. Wyeth, at 701 7th St. SW. A new library building opened in 1965 and closed in June 2019, with a new $18 million building to be constructed in its place. During construction, interim library service was provided at 425 M Street SW.

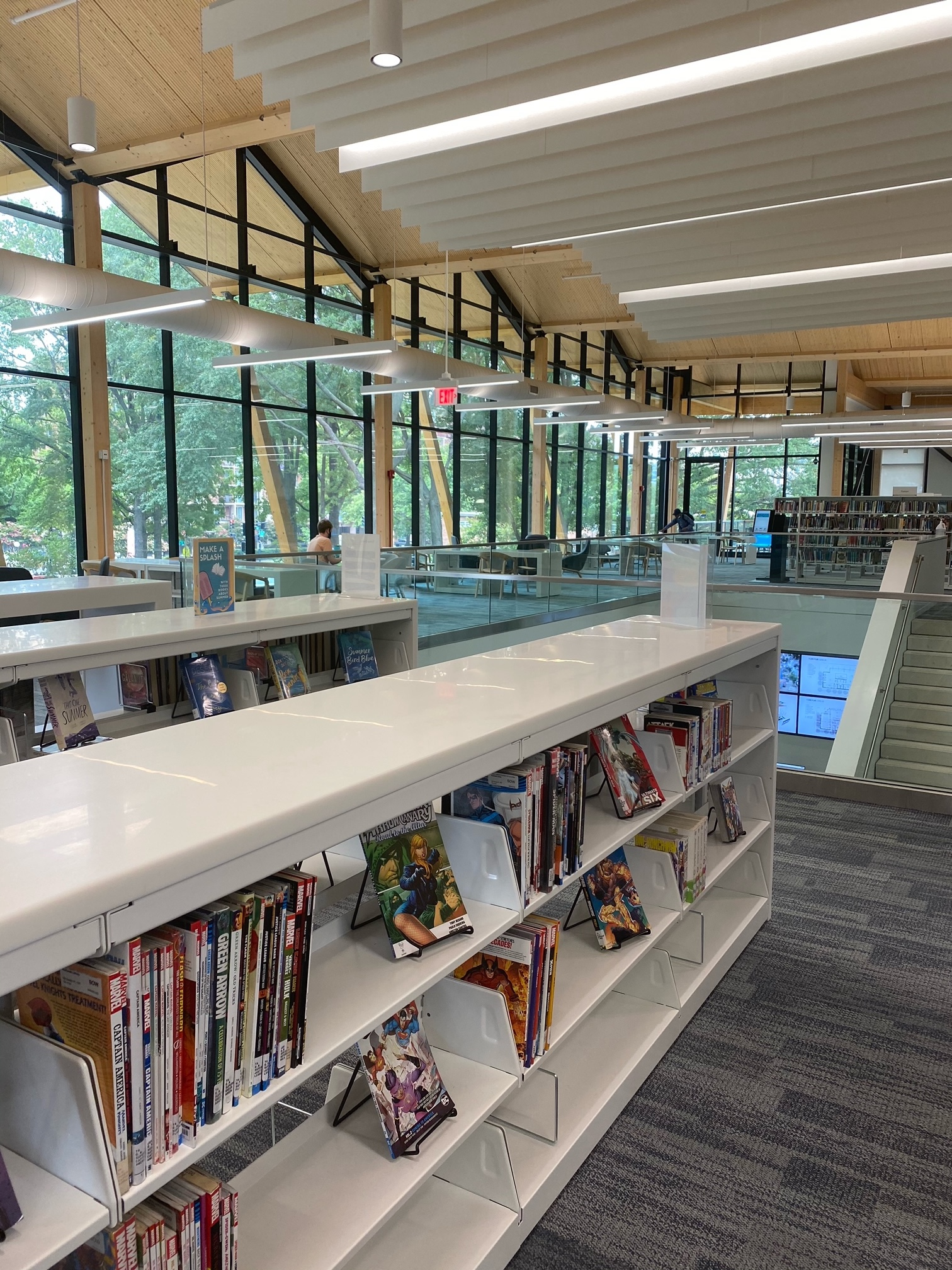
The interior of the new Southwest Neighborhood Library in 2021.

The new 20,000-square-foot building, which opened in May 2021, was designed by Perkins and Will and built by Turner Construction. Built primarily out of mass timber and glass, it was produced in pieces in Vancouver and shipped to Washington, where it was assembled.

Though it is one floor shorter than the old building, the new library was designed with a focus on community space. It includes a large meeting room, three conference rooms, and four study rooms, as well as an outdoor porch. New technology incorporated in the rebuilt library includes an innovation lab with 3-D printers, as well as solar panels that provide for half of the building's energy needs. The D.C. Department of Parks and Recreation also collaborated with the library to improve the playground adjacent to the building.
