= Cleveland Park Neighborhood Library =

Library in Washington, D.C., U.S.

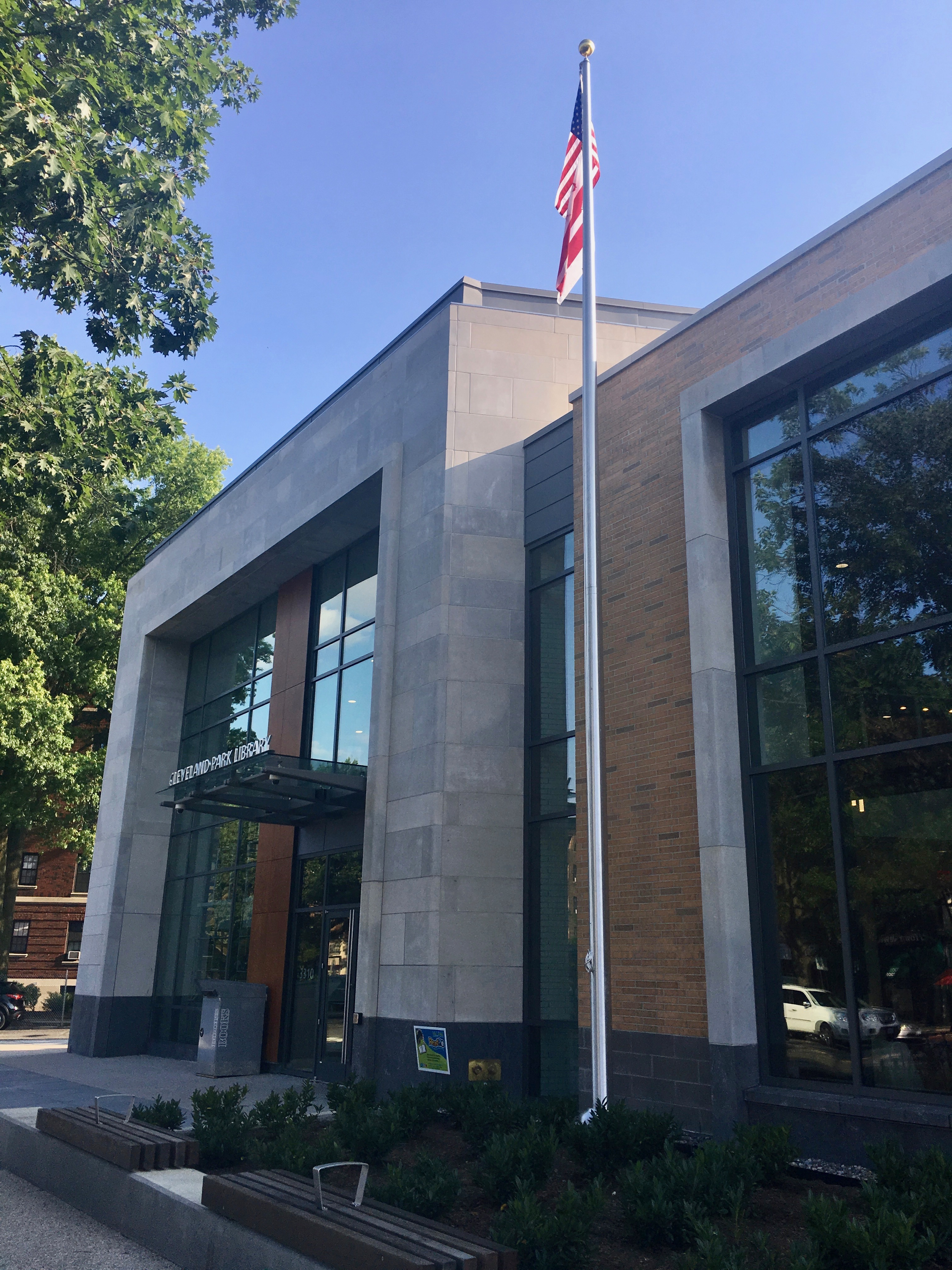
- 38.933852°N 77.057800°W
- Location: 3310 Connecticut Ave. NW Washington, DC 20008, United States
- Type: Public library
- Branch of: District of Columbia Public Library

Other information
- Website: https://www.dclibrary.org/clevelandpark

The Cleveland Park Neighborhood Library is a branch of the District of Columbia Public Library in the Cleveland Park neighborhood of Washington, D.C. It is located at 3310 Connecticut Avenue NW. A library building opened on the site in 1953 and was replaced in 2018 by a larger facility that was built at a cost of $19.7 million. The new library's design garnered praise and plaudits; DCist described it as "strikingly stylish" and it won the 2019 Urban Catalyst award from the local chapter of the American Institute of Architects.

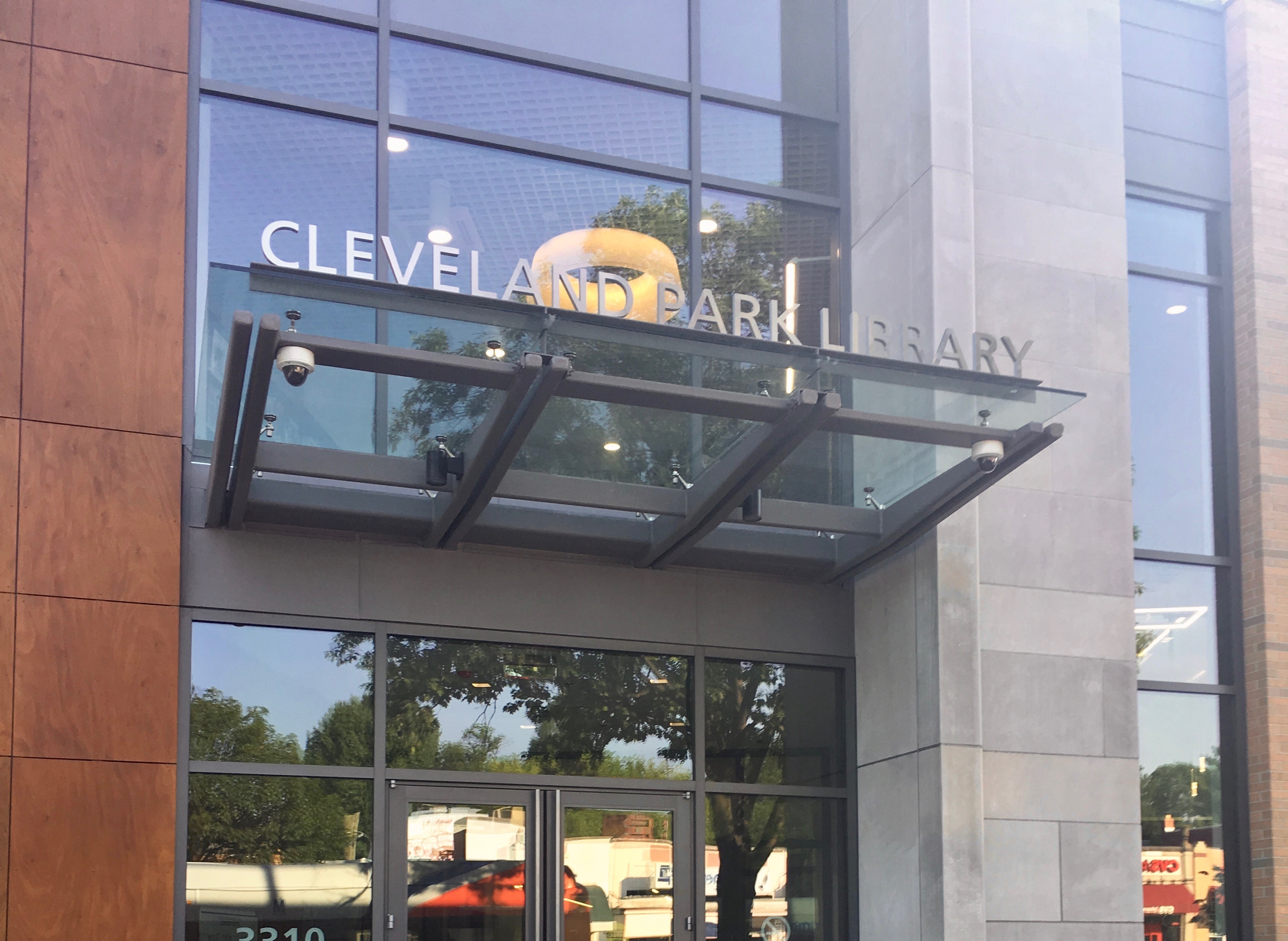
The sign outside the new Cleveland Park Neighborhood Library in 2018.

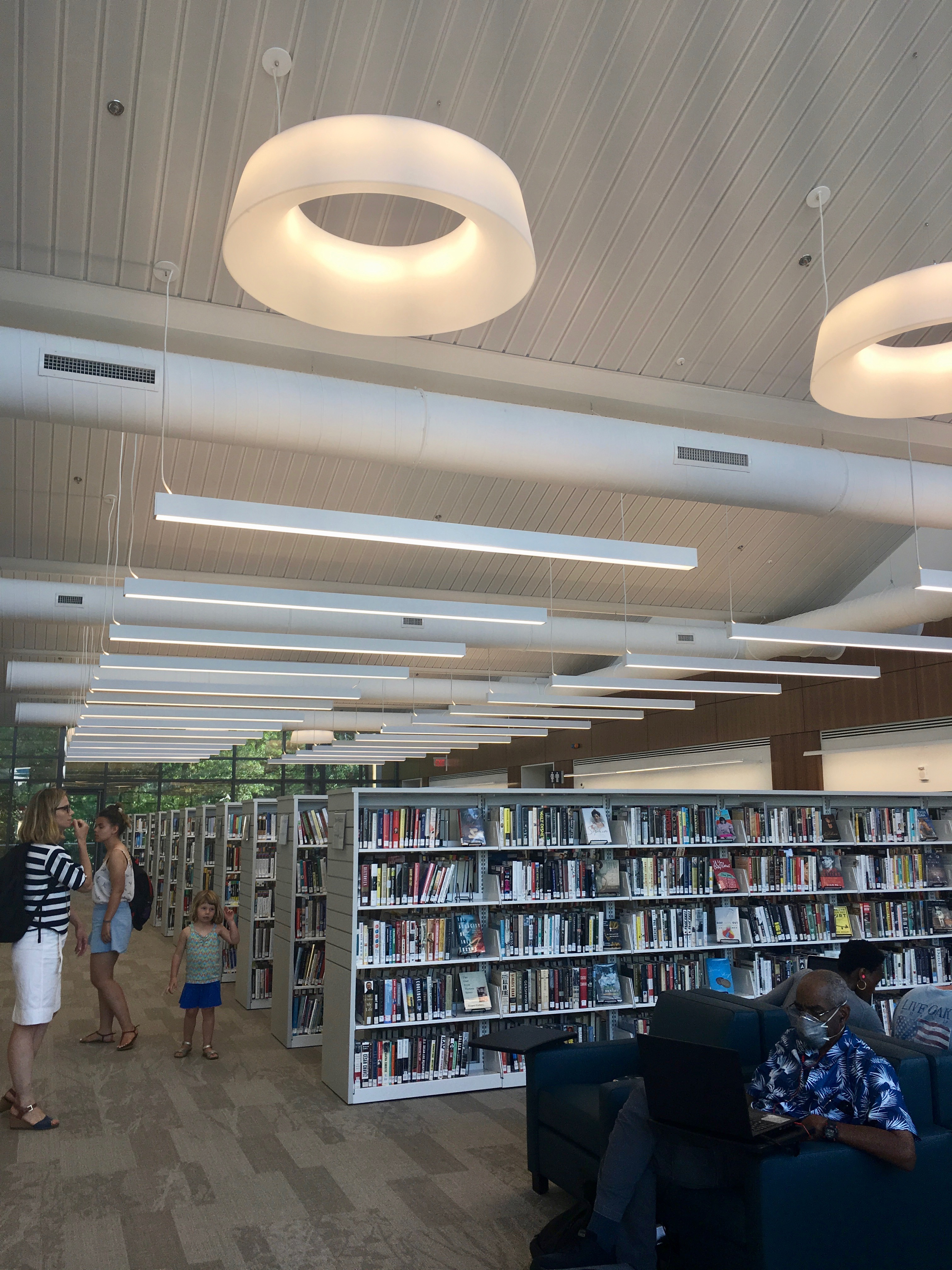
The interior of the new Cleveland Park Neighborhood Library in 2018.
