= Bellevue / William O. Lockridge Library =

Bellevue/William O. Lockridge Neighborhood Library
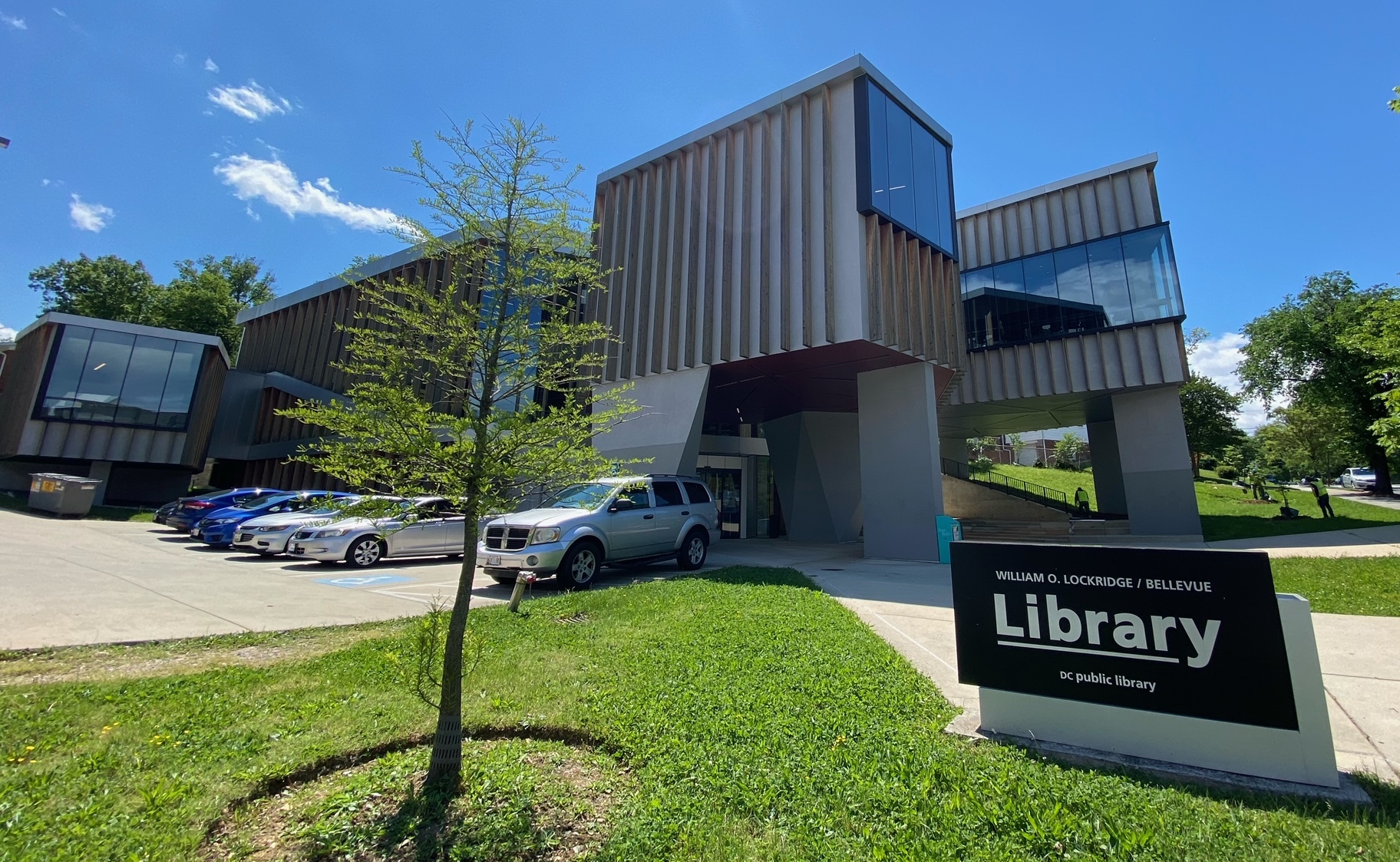
- 38.83128°N 77.00936°W
- Location: 115 Atlantic St. S.W., Washington, D.C., United States
- Type: Public library
- Established: 14 October 1959
- Branch of: District of Columbia Public Library

Other information
- Website: DC Public Library website

Bellevue/William O. Lockridge Neighborhood Library is part of the District of Columbia Public Library (DCPL) System. It was originally opened to the public in 1959. It was renovated with a design by British architect David Adjaye and named after activist William O'Neal Lockridge.

== History ==
The Bellevue/William O. Lockridge Neighborhood Library was built in 1959 as the Washington Highlands Branch Library, funded under a public works program for the District of Columbia. The building was renamed by the DC Council after it was rebuilt on the original site in 2012.

Designed by David Adjaye, the new Bellevue/William O. Lockridge Neighborhood Library was described in Architectural Record as "more like a Brutalist treehouse than the glimmering pavilion that is the Francis A. Gregory Neighborhood Library." The library is set on a steep, hilly site, named both for a community activist and the Bellevue neighborhood.

== See also ==
- District of Columbia Public Library
- Washington Highlands, Washington, D.C.
- Bellevue (Washington, D.C.)
