= List of Carnegie libraries in Washington, D.C. =

The following list of Carnegie libraries in Washington, D.C. provides detailed information on United States Carnegie libraries in Washington, D.C., where 4 public libraries were built from one grant (totaling $682,000) awarded by the Carnegie Corporation of New York on March 16, 1899 (a philanthropic fund established by Andrew Carnegie). In addition, Howard University library (an academic library) was granted in 1910.

== Key ==
Building still operating as a library
Building standing, but now serving another purpose
Building listed on the National Register of Historic Places
Building contributes to a historic district on the National Register of Historic Places

== Carnegie libraries ==
	Library	Image	Location	Notes
1	Main		Mt. Vernon Square; 38°54′09″N 77°01′22″W	The 11th library in the US to receive a grant. Designed by New York firm Ackerman and Ross, this Beaux-Arts building was dedicated on January 7, 1903. Andrew Carnegie and President Theodore Roosevelt attended the ceremony. The building ceased to serve as the central branch of DC Public Library in 1970; it now houses the offices, collections, and research library of the Historical Society of Washington, D.C. It also houses an Apple store.
2	Mount Pleasant		1600 Lamont St., NW; 38°55′50″N 77°02′14″W	Designed by noted library architect Edward Lippincott Tilton, this is the last library built with Carnegie funds in Washington, D.C., having opened on May 15, 1925.
3	Southeast		403 7th St., SE; 38°53′2.67″N 76°59′47.25″W	Another building designed by Edward Lippincott Tilton, this library sits on a triangular site. It opened December 8, 1922.
4	Takoma Park		416 Cedar St., NW; 38°58′28.99″N 77°1′7.08″W	Built in the Renaissance Revival style by Marsh and Peter and opening on November 17, 1911, this was the first branch library in Washington, D.C. The building was renovated in 2008 and 2009.

== Academic library ==
	Institution	Image	Date granted	Grant amount	Location	Notes
1	Howard University		Dec 2, 1907	$50,000	Carnegie Bldg. 38°55′22.32″N 77°1′15.04″W	A Whitfield & King of New York design, this building was dedicated April 25, 1910, in exercises attended by Andrew Carnegie and President William Howard Taft. It was repurposed in 1937, now serving as office space.

== See also ==
- List of libraries in the United States
