= Waldo L. Schmitt =

American biologist (1887-1977)

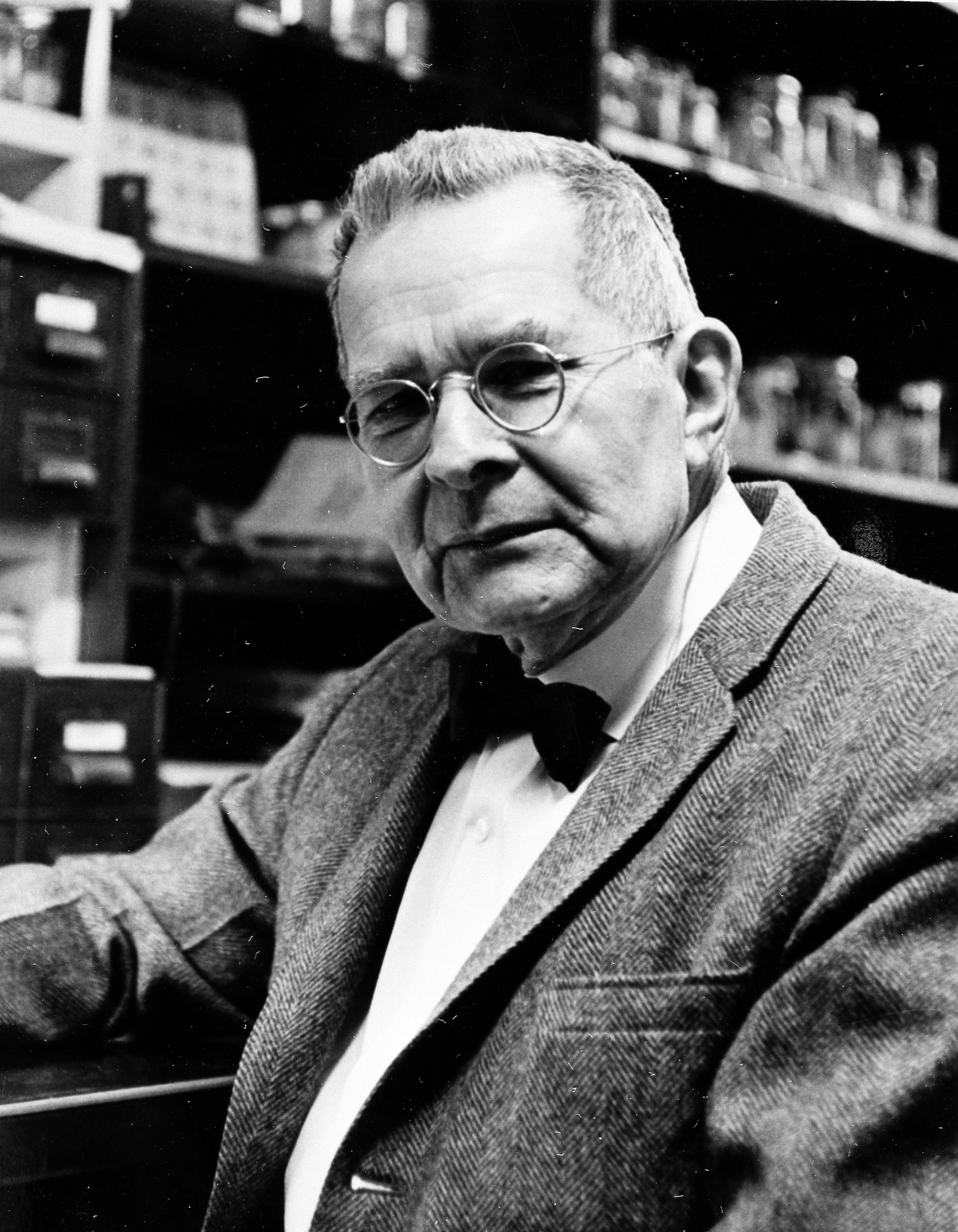
- Schmitt in 1965
- Born: June 25, 1887; Washington, D.C.
- Died: August 5, 1977 (aged 90); Sandy Spring, Maryland
- Education: George Washington University
- Spouse: Alvina Stumm
- Scientific career
- Fields: carcinology
- Workplaces: United States National Museum, Bureau of Plant Industry

Waldo LaSalle Schmitt (June 25, 1887 – August 5, 1977) was an American biologist born in Washington, D.C. He received his Ph.D. from George Washington University in 1922. In 1948, he received an honorary Doctor of Science degree from the University of Southern California. Schmitt's primary field of zoological investigation was carcinology, with special emphasis on the decapod crustaceans (crabs, lobsters, shrimp, and so on). His bibliography consists of more than seventy titles.

== Career ==
Schmitt was an Aide in Economic Botany for the United States Department of Agriculture 1907–1910. He was appointed Scientific Aide in the Division of Marine Invertebrates of the United States National Museum. He studied Crustacea with Mary Jane Rathbun. He served on the staff of the United States Bureau of Fisheries as Scientific Assistant. He was naturalist aboard the Albatross 1911–1914. He was Assistant Curator at the United States National Museum as in the Division of Marine Invertebrates 1915–1920. He was Instructor of Zoology at George Washington University 1917. He was named Curator of the Division of Marine Invertebrates 1920–1943. He was head Curator of the Department of Biology 1943, Head Curator of Zoology 1943–1957.

He was an Honorary Research Associate and continued his association with the Smithsonian Institution until his death on 5 August 1977.

== Personal life ==
He was married to Alvina Stumm.

== Biological expeditions ==
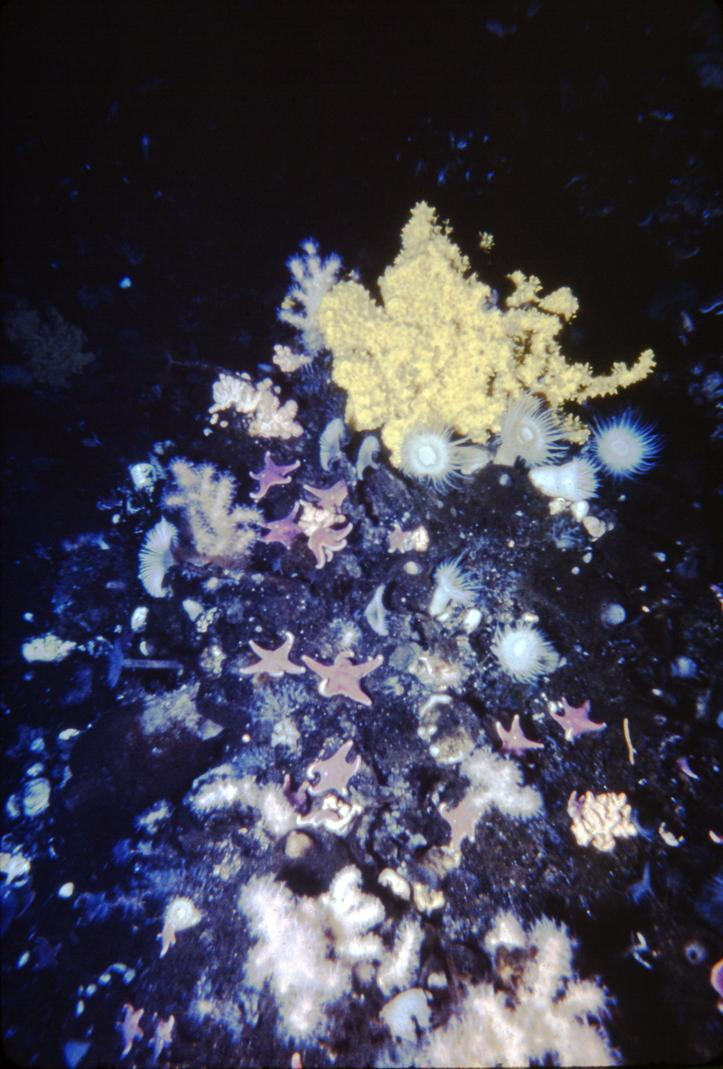
Invertebrates at 85 feet, Turtle Rock, Antarctica. Photo from Schmitt's Antarctic expedition, 1962-63

- 1918 studying the life history of the spiny lobster at the Scripps Institution of Oceanography, La Jolla, California.
- 1924–1925, was at the Carnegie Institution's Marine Laboratory at Dry Tortugas, Florida, surveying the crustacean fauna of the area, identifying crustaceans found in the stomachs of fishes.
- 1925, awarded the Smithsonian's Walter Rathbone Bacon Traveling Scholarship "for the study of the fauna of countries other than the United States." The scholarship enabled him to collect marine invertebrates along the east coast of South America and to edit an exsiccata-like specimen series with the title Algae of South America, Walter Rathbone Bacon Scholarship, 1925–1927.
- 1927 Schmitt was aboard Fleurus at Deception Island
- 1933–1935, to the Galápagos Islands sponsored by G. Allan Hancock of Los Angeles, California.
- 1937, a guest of Huntington Hartford, he explored and collected in the West Indies on the Smithsonian-Hartford West Indies Expedition.
- 1938, accompanied President Franklin D. Roosevelt as naturalist on the Presidential Cruise to Clipperton Island, Cocos, and the Galapagos Islands.
- 1939, member of the Hancock South America Expedition and
- 1940 Biologist in charge of field operations on the first United States Fish and Wildlife Service Alaska king crab investigation.
- 1941–1942, on special detail with the United States Navy investigating the possibility of establishing a biological station in the Galapagos Islands.
- 1943, visited South America, under the auspices of the State Department, for the purpose of strengthening relations between United States and Latin American scientists.
- 1955, headed the Smithsonian–Bredin Belgian Congo Expedition.
- 1956–1960 led Bredin-sponsored expeditions to the Caribbean (1956, 1958, 1959), the Society Islands (1957), and the Yucatan (1960).
- 1961–1962 Sponsored by a grant from the Office of Naval Research, Schmitt spent the summers with Harry Pederson photographing the coral reef fauna of the Bahamas Islands.
- 1962–1963, his last expedition - member of the Survey of the United States Antarctic Research Program, the Staten Island cruise to Marguerite Bay and Weddell Sea.

== Participation in Scientific Societies ==
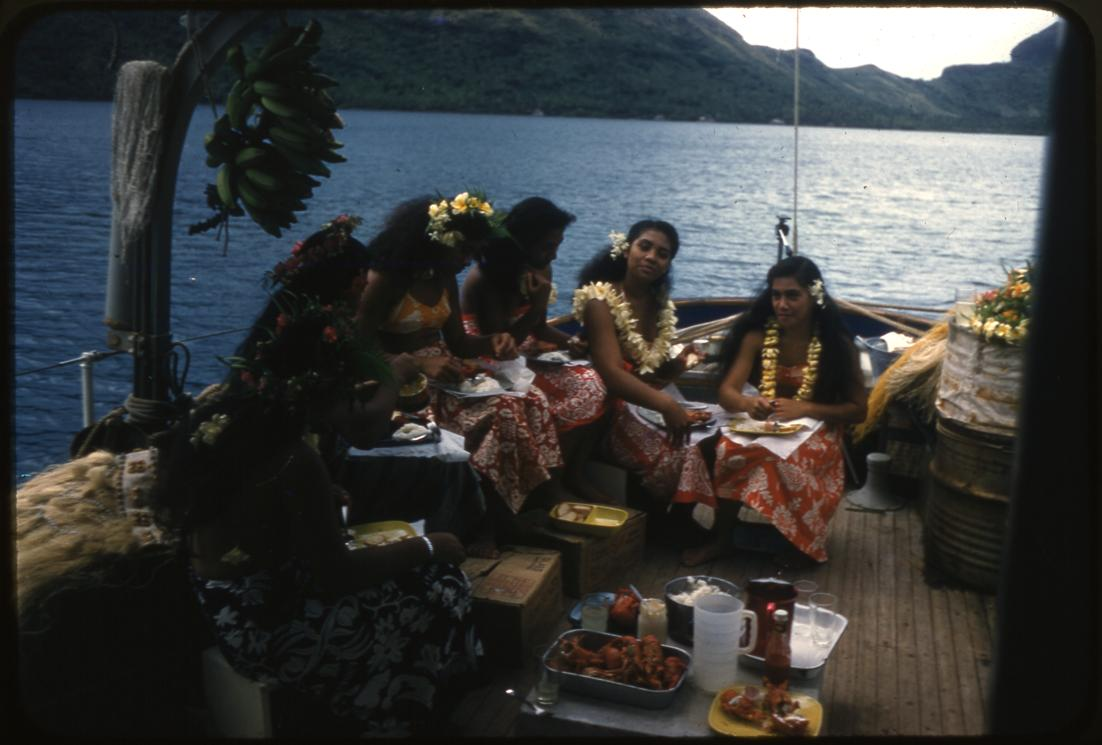
Lobster lunch aboard the research vessel Mureva, with dancers from Bora Bora. Photo from Schmitt's Smithsonian-Bredin Expedition, 1956.

He was the president of the Washington Academy of Sciences in 1947 and a founding member of the Society of Systematic Zoology, serving as president in 1948. He was a trustee of the Bear's Bluff Laboratories, International Oceanographic Foundation, and the Serological Museum of Rutgers University.

== Legacy ==
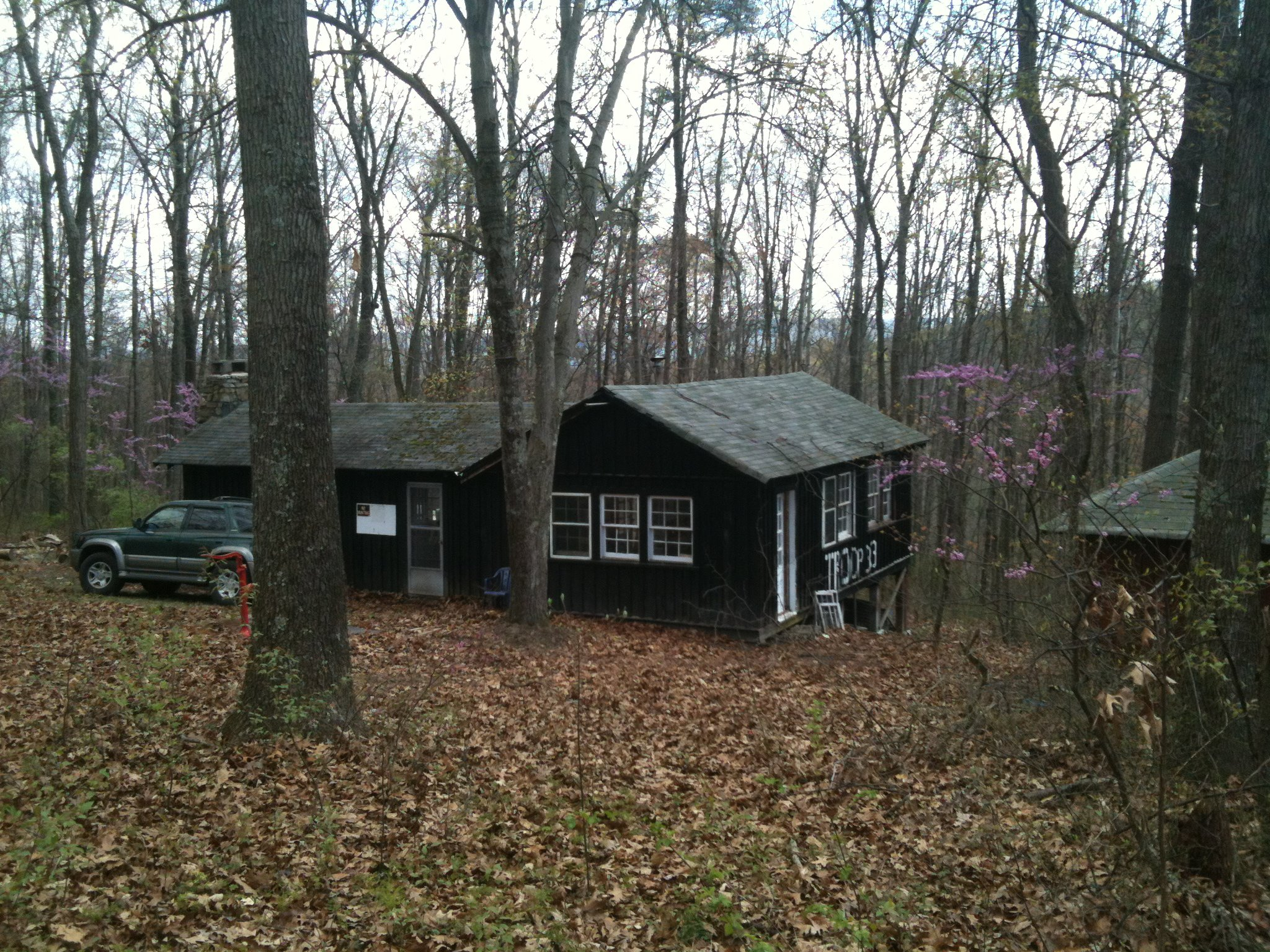
Camp Schmitt

Several locations, as well as the clam genus Waldo, are named after him. Waldo's Wilds, a park in Takoma Park is one such place; on this property was Schmitt's house, which he donated to the City of Takoma Park. Because they did not have sufficient money to maintain it, they gave it to the county. The house was demolished about 1990. The land had plants and shrubs which he had collected from around the world, as well as one of the largest trees in the county on it. It is located at 38.9699°N 77.0045°W.

Camp Waldo Schmitt, located in Augusta, West Virginia (39.353478°N 78.577712°W), is named in honor of Schmitt and his son, Waldo Earnest Schmitt. Furthermore, a seminar room in the National Museum of Natural History (Smithsonian Institution) as well as Schmitt Mesa in Antarctica bear his name.
