= Takoma (Washington, D.C.) =

Neighborhood of Washington, D.C.

- Neighborhood of Washington, D.C.
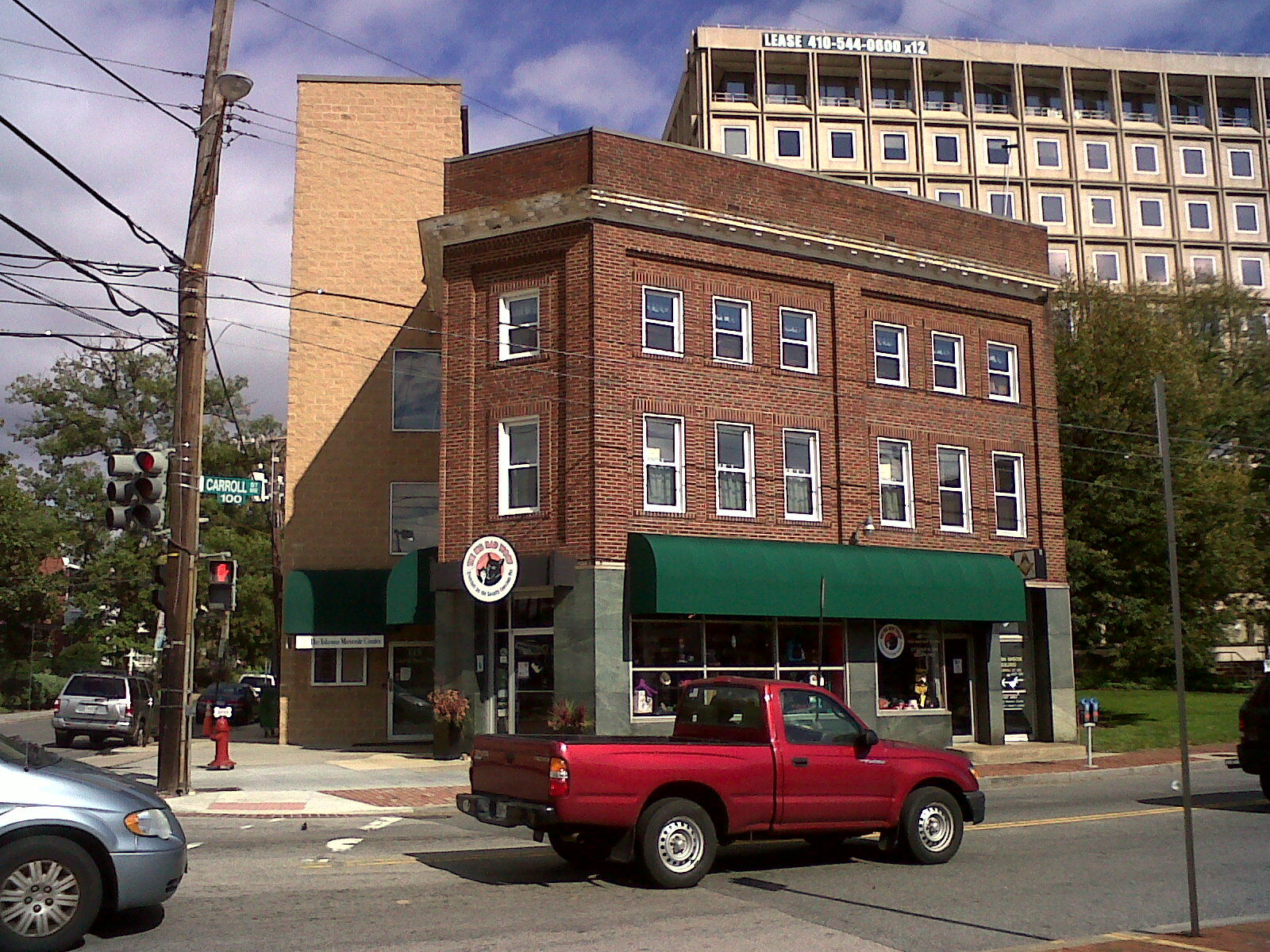
- Takoma Masonic Building

- Location within the District of Columbia
- Coordinates: 38°58′30″N 77°1′13″W
- Country: United States
- District: Washington, D.C.
- Ward: Ward 4

Government
  - Councilmember: Janeese Lewis George
- Postal code: ZIP code

Takoma is a neighborhood in Northwest Washington, D.C. It is located in Advisory Neighborhood Commission 4B, in the district's Fourth Ward. It borders the city of Takoma Park, Maryland.

== Overview ==
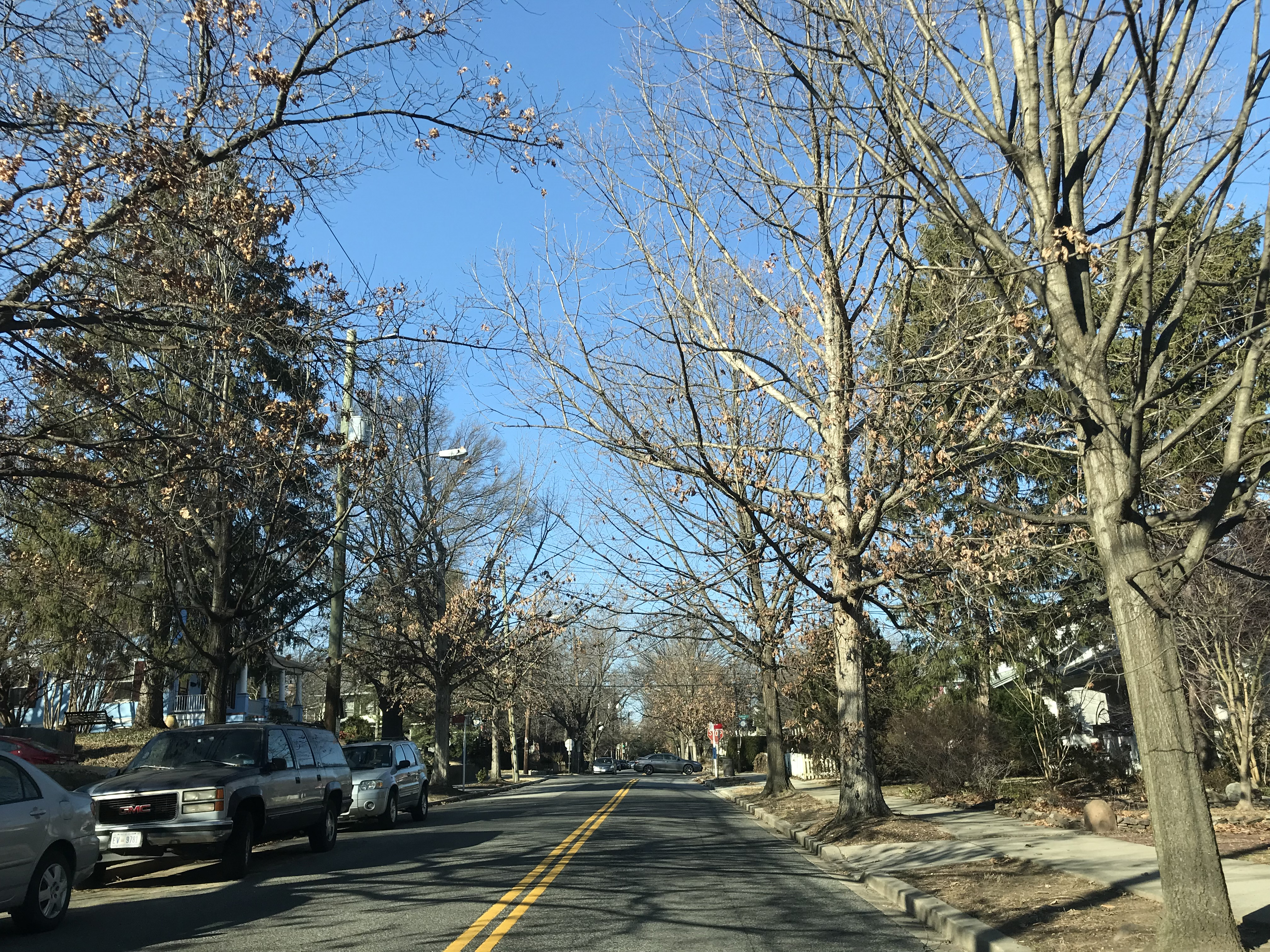
Intersection of 5th St. and Aspen St. NW, Takoma, February 2019

In 2019 Nina Zafar of the Washington Post characterized Takoma as an ethnically diverse neighborhood, and stated that it "feels like a small town within a big city, and residents are proud of its broad-mindedness." It is populated mostly by middle-class families. Its small downtown has recently been redeveloped, bringing in new residents and attractive new businesses. Many of the houses in Takoma are historic, and some are over 100 years old.

== Geography ==
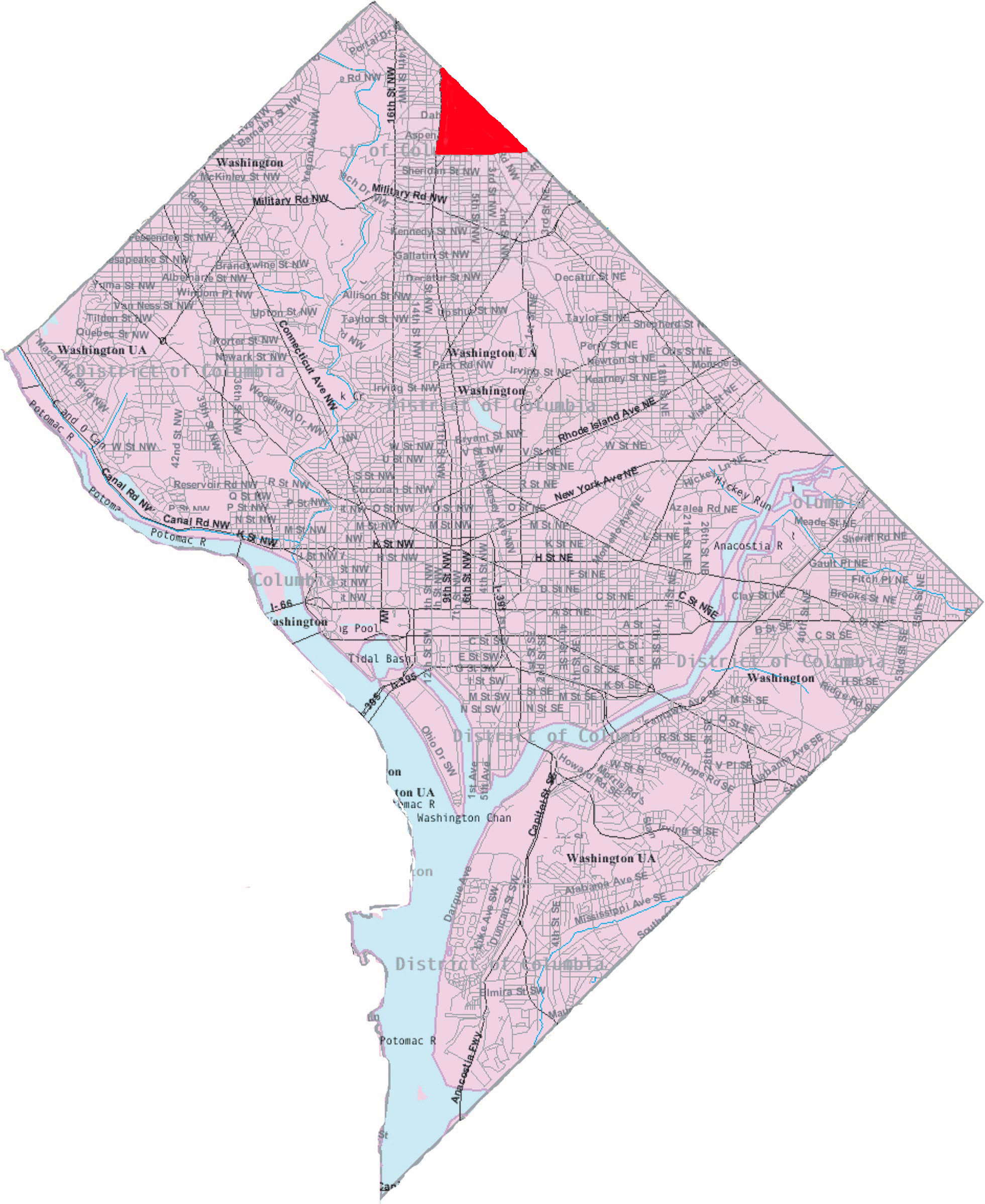
Map of Washington, D.C., with Takoma highlighted in red

Along Eastern Avenue, Takoma borders Takoma Park, Maryland, a city with which Takoma shares its origins. Takoma shares a common identity with the neighboring city in Maryland, and the downtown area surrounding the Takoma Metro station crosses the District of Columbia line.

Takoma is bounded by Georgia Avenue to the west, somewhere between Tuckerman and Van Buren Streets to the south, and Eastern Avenue to the northeast. The former site of the Walter Reed Army Medical Center on Georgia Avenue separates it from Rock Creek Park. However, the neighborhood historically and culturally spans across the Maryland line into the greater neighborhood of Takoma Park.

== History ==
- Takoma Park Historic District
- U.S. National Register of Historic Places
- U.S. Historic district
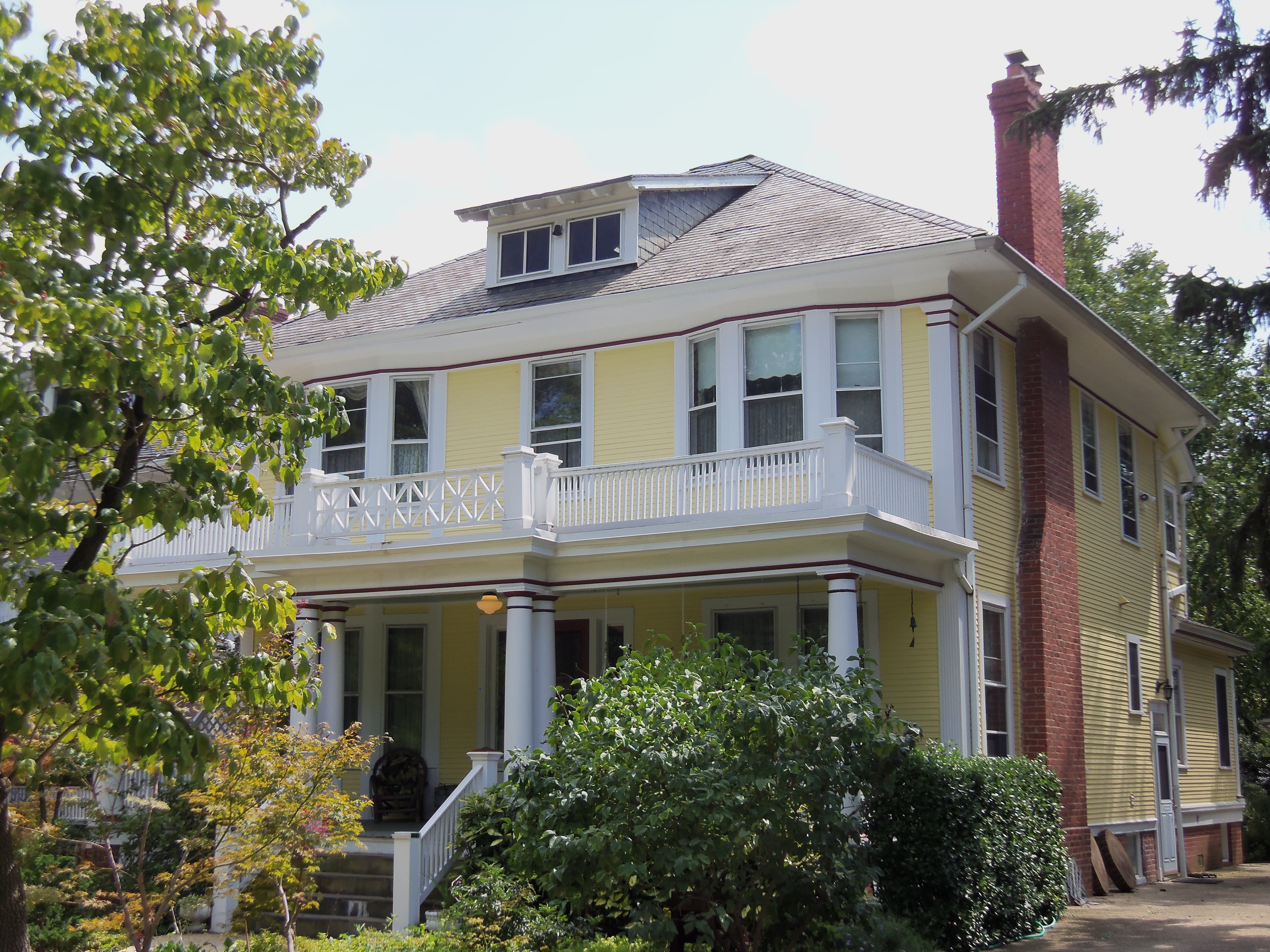
- House on Cedar St. NW

- Location within the United States
- Location: Roughly bounded by DC/Maryland boundary, 7th Street, Piney Branch Road, Aspen Street, and Fern Street.
- NRHP reference No.: 83001416
- Added to NRHP: June 30, 1983

Takoma, which was originally named Takoma Park, was developed in 1883 by developer Benjamin Franklin Gilbert as a commuter suburb on the Metropolitan Branch of the Baltimore and Ohio railroad line. Gilbert welcomed the Seventh-day Adventist Church to set up their world headquarters and publishing house in Takoma Park, D.C. with a hospital and college in neighboring Takoma Park, Maryland, and promoted the community's reputation for vegetarianism and "clean living" away from the "malarial swamps" of the city. Takoma, D.C. was originally regarded as the commercial hub for the entire surrounding area, prior to the development of Silver Spring, Maryland, as it featured large shops and industrial buildings in the area now occupied by the Metro station. Its commercial hub is considered to be part of Takoma Park's Historic District.

Gilbert wished to rename the train stop called Brightwood, and the name Takoma was chosen in 1883 by D.C. resident Ida Summy, who believed it to mean "high up" or "near heaven".

The Seventh-day Adventist Church maintained its world headquarters and a publishing house on the Eastern Avenue side of the D.C. line until the early 1980s; after moving to Silver Spring, the former site of the publishing house became art lofts and rehearsal space for the Washington Opera.

The Takoma Theater, built in 1924, is located in the neighborhood and is supported by the Takoma Theatre Conservancy, a nonprofit preservation group that raised money to buy and refurbish the theater.

The Takoma Masonic Center's ground-breaking ceremony took place on November 12, 1924, at the corner of Carroll Street NW and Maple Street NW. On November 29, 1924, the masonic cornerstone ceremony was conducted by the Grand Master of Masons of the District of Columbia, Charles F. Roberts, and Grand Lodge officers and members of the Grand Lodge of the District of Columbia, Free And Accepted Masons. Hiram-Takoma Lodge No. 10 and Takoma Chapter No. 12, Order of the Eastern Star of the District of Columbia, have met there since May 27, 1925.

Both Takoma Park, D.C., and Takoma Park, Maryland, have been noted, regionally and nationally, for progressive politics dating from the 1960s, when area residents (led by future Takoma Park, Maryland mayor Sammie Abbott) rallied to prevent a 10-lane freeway from bisecting the community, and lobbied to build the Metrorail system, near the site of the former B&O railroad station around which the community had been built. Neighbors Inc, a non-profit interracial group of DC residents, worked extensively in the early 1960s to oppose blockbusting efforts and to foster integrated middle-class neighborhoods. Both of the remaining areas, on either side of the D.C.-Maryland line, are now protected as U.S. Historic Districts.

== Transportation ==
The neighborhood is served by the Takoma station on the Washington Metro.

== Education ==
The District of Columbia Public Schools operates public schools. Takoma Education Campus (K-8 school) and Calvin Coolidge High School are the public schools of the area.

The District of Columbia Public Library operates the Takoma Park Neighborhood Library. It was the first neighborhood library in Washington, D.C., and a Carnegie library.

== See also ==
- Cady-Lee, a historic home in Takoma
- Takoma (disambiguation)
