= Takoma station =

Washington Metro station

Takoma
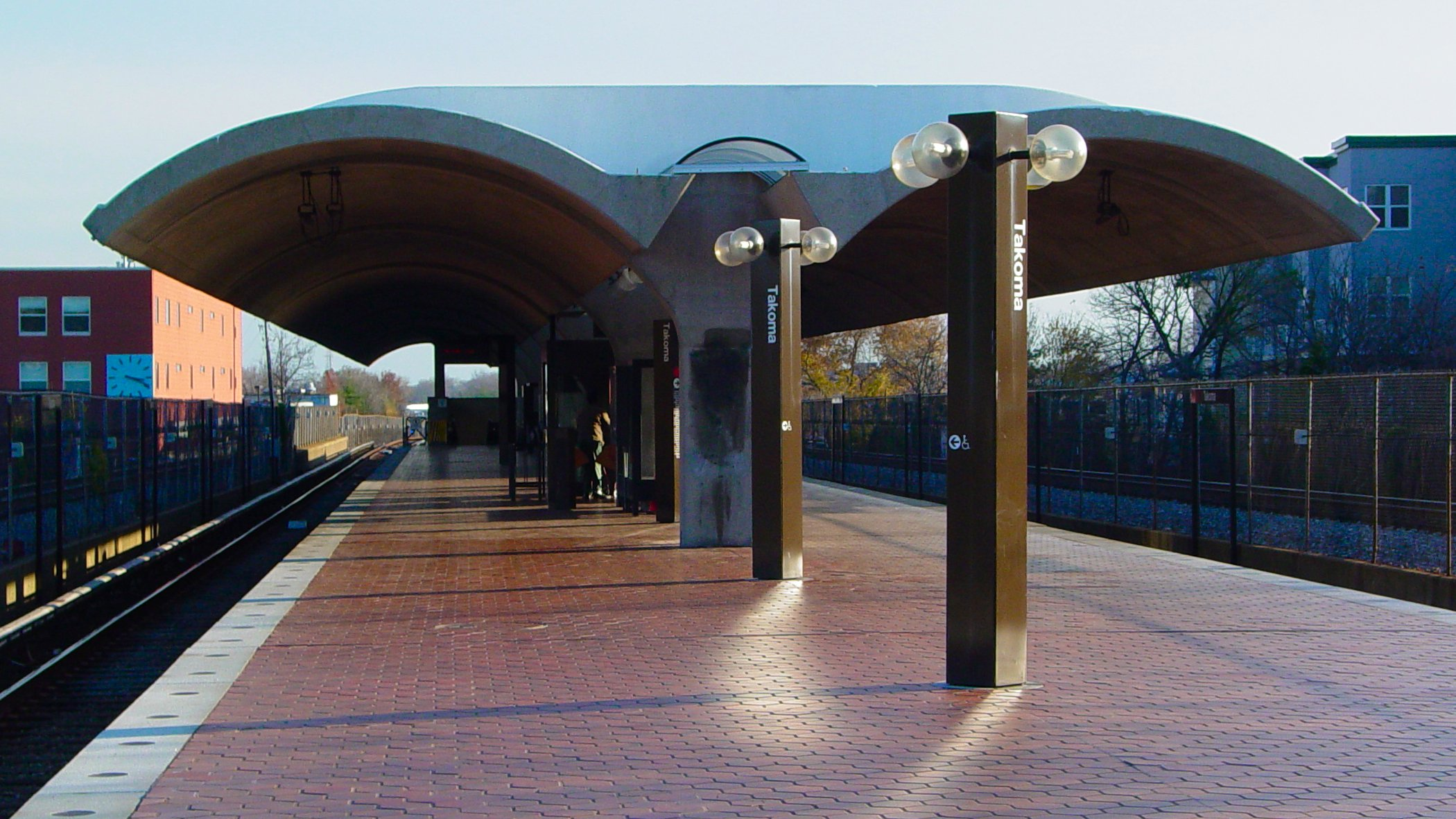
- Takoma station platform in February 2007

General information
- Location: 327 Cedar Street NW; Washington, D.C.
- Coordinates: 38.975532°N 77.017834°W
- Owner: WMATA
- Platforms: 1 island platform
- Tracks: 2
- Connections: Metrobus: C75, C77, D50, D5X, P42; Ride On: 12, 13, 14, 16, 18, 24, 25

Construction
- Structure type: At-grade
- Parking: 146 spaces
- Cycle facilities: Capital Bikeshare, 38 racks, 60 lockers
- Accessible: Yes

Other information
- Station code: B07

History
- Opened: February 6, 1978; 48 years ago

Passengers
- 2025: 4,460 (average weekday)
- Rank: 40 of 98

Services
Preceding station	Washington Metro	Following station
Fort Totten toward Shady Grove	Red Line	Silver Spring toward Glenmont
Former services at Takoma Park
Preceding station	Baltimore and Ohio Railroad	Following station
North Takoma toward Chicago	Main Line	Washington, D.C. toward Jersey City
North Takoma toward Chicago	Main Line	University toward Jersey City
Route map
Location

Takoma station is a Washington Metro station on the Red Line in the Takoma neighborhood of Washington, D.C., bordering Takoma Park, Maryland. The station is considered to be located in part of the Takoma Park Historic District. It is the last station in the District of Columbia on the eastern end of the Red Line heading to Maryland, located east of the intersection of Blair Road NW and Cedar Street NW. The station's parking lot and bus stops are accessed from Eastern Avenue NW, which runs along the DC–Maryland border line.

== History ==
Before Metrorail, the Baltimore and Ohio Railroad (B&O) operated commuter trains that served intra-DC locations, including Takoma Park (this service continues as MARC's Brunswick Line, although the closest station serving the area is in Silver Spring, Maryland). The original Takoma Park railroad station, located in DC, burned down in 1962. Commuter rail service ended before Metrorail service began.

In the early 1970s, the disused shelter for the rail stop was demolished to widen the right-of-way to accommodate Metrorail. Remnants of the rail stop are visible to the west of the Metro station.

Takoma station, which shares architectural features with Metro's other above-ground stations. was among the first to open after the system's inauguration on March 27, 1976. Service to Takoma began on February 6, 1978.

In 2017, the station was closed from November 25 to December 10 as part of Metro's Capital Improvement Program. The work mainly focused on replacing and repairing existing tracks.

The station was closed from June 1 to 28, 2024, to allow construction of the Purple Line.

=== 2009 collision ===
On June 22, 2009, a southbound Metro train on the Red Line collided with another southbound train, which was stopped between the Takoma and Fort Totten stations, causing the deadliest accident in the system's history.

== Station layout ==
The entrance to the station is at the street level, with escalators leading up to the platform. A separate accessible entrance consisting of a single elevator is located near the middle of the platform. The separate accessible and general entrances are a relative rarity in the Washington Metro system; only Rosslyn, Ballston-MU, Judiciary Square and Tenleytown–AU stations share this feature. The station is compliant with the Americans with Disabilities Act of 1990. In the event that the elevator is not operational, the station is not accessible for wheelchair users and shuttle service to the next station is provided.

Like NoMa-Gallaudet U, Brookland–CUA, Fort Totten, and Silver Spring, Takoma is located in the middle of the CSX Metropolitan Subdivision rail line. There are two tracks to either side of the island platform, with Metro trains using the inner tracks and Amtrak and MARC Trains using the outer tracks.
