= Eastern Avenue (Washington, D.C.) =

- Eastern Avenue NW, Eastern Avenue NE
- Interactive map of Eastern Avenue
- Owner: District of Columbia, Montgomery County, and Prince George's County
- Maintained by: DDOT, MCDOT, PGC DPW&T
- Location: Northwest and Northeast, Washington, DC and Montgomery and Prince George's counties
- Nearest metro station: Takoma and Deanwood
- Coordinates: 38°58′29.2″N 77°0′50.2″W
- West end: MD 384 / MD 390 / Blair Circle
- Major junctions: US 29 (Georgia Avenue); MD 650 (New Hampshire Avenue); MD 500 / Michigan Avenue NE; US 1 (Rhode Island Avenue) US 1 Alt. (Bladensburg Road); MD 295 (Anacostia Freeway); MD 704 / 63rd Street SE
- East end: Southern Avenue SE

Eastern Avenue is one of three boundary streets between Washington, D.C., and the state of Maryland. It follows a northwest-to-southeast line, beginning at the intersection of 16th Street NW (a north-south street in the District of Columbia) and Colesville Road (a street in Montgomery County in the state of Maryland). It intersects with Blair Road NW, and ceases to exist for about 1,000 feet (300 m). Another interruption occurs at Cedar Street NW. A 3,000-foot (910 m) interruption occurs again at Galloway Street NE, where the park land of the North Michigan Park Recreation Center exists. It continues without interruption until it reaches Bladensburg Road NE. There is a 1.8-mile (2.9 km) interruption in the avenue along Fort Lincoln Cemetery. The avenue has no crossing over New York Avenue NE or the Anacostia River, or through Anacostia Park. It resumes at Kenilworth Avenue NE, with its terminus at its junction with Southern Avenue.

Several historic or important buildings are located on Eastern Avenue, and a number of important people once lived on the street. Eastern Avenue forms one of the borders of the Deanwood neighborhood in the District of Columbia, a historic African American community. Several historically important Deanwood-area churches and schools are located on Eastern Avenue. William Pittman, one of the United States' first African American architects and a son-in-law of Booker T. Washington, lived on Eastern Avenue. The Lucinda Cady House (also known as the Cady-Lee House), located at 7064 Eastern Avenue NW, is a restored Queen Anne-Victorian style home built in 1887 which is listed on the National Register of Historic Places. The headquarters of the missionary arm and the relief agency of the worldwide Seventh-day Adventist Church were once located at 6840 Eastern Avenue NW.

Eastern Avenue bridges the Anacostia Freeway after its junction with Kenilworth Avenue. The Eastern Avenue Bridge has a clearance of 14 feet (4.3 m), and semi-trailer trucks have struck the bridge numerous times. In November 2009, the District of Columbia announced that it would spend $10.4 million in stimulus funds to replace the bridge with a new precast, 16-foot (4.9 m) high bridge to address these safety concerns.

Eastern Avenue appears in several works of crime fiction, because of the higher rate of crime in some of the neighborhoods through which it passes. It is significantly featured in Jim Beame's 2006 short crime story, "Jeannette." Noted Washington, D.C., crime author George Pelecanos used it as a location in his 1996 novel The Big Blowdown, and so did Montana-born author James Grady in his 2007 novel, Mad Dogs.
