= Takoma Park, Maryland =

City in Maryland, United States

- City
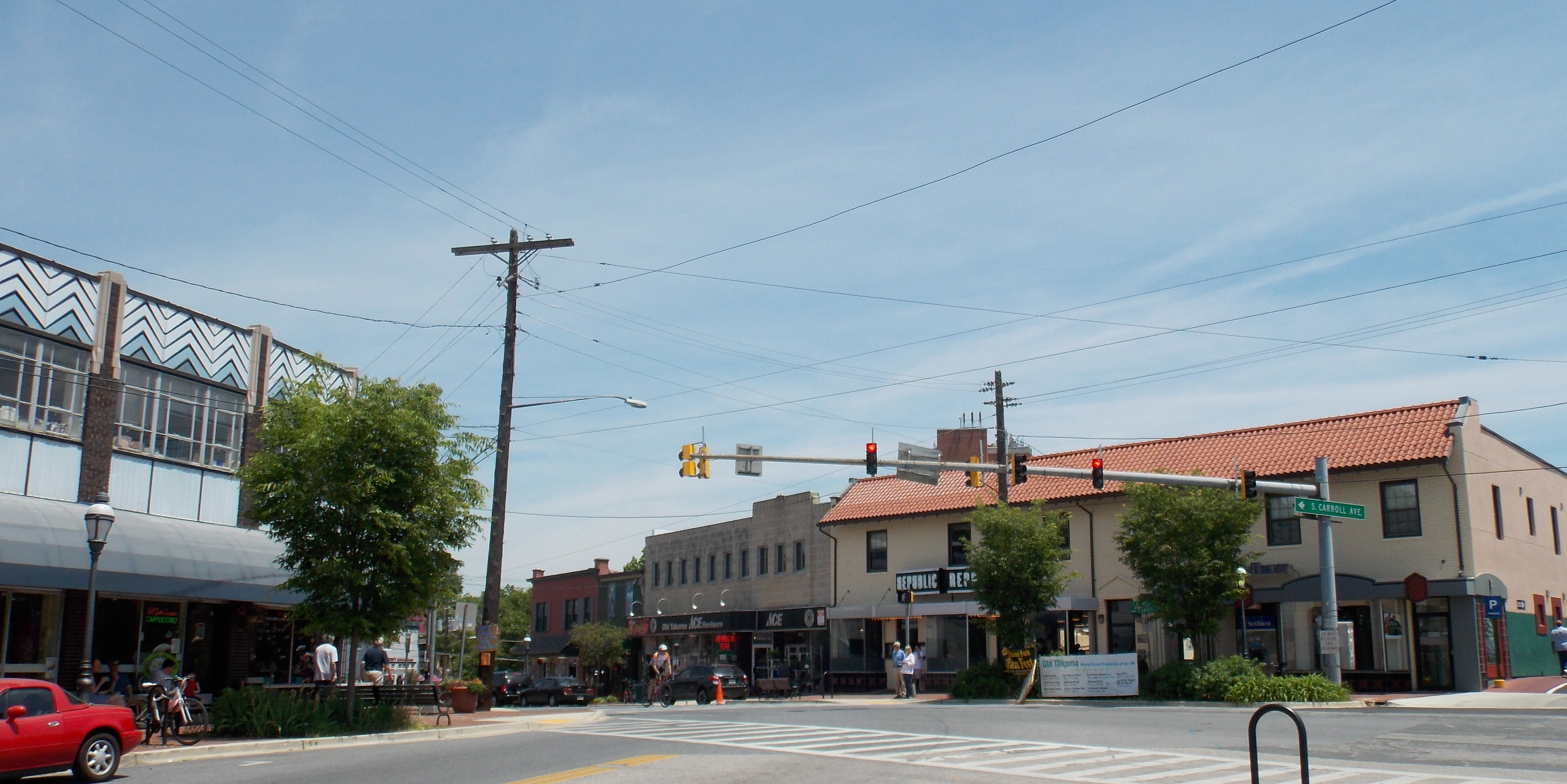
- The intersection of Laurel and Carroll Avenues

- Seal
- Nicknames: TKPK, "Berkeley of the East", "Azalea City"
- Location of Takoma Park in Maryland
- Coordinates: 38°58′40″N 77°0′27″W
- Country: United States
- State: Maryland
- County: Montgomery
- Founded: 1883
- Incorporated: 1890

Government
  - Type: Municipal council-manager

Area
  - Total: 2.10 sq mi (5.43 km^{2})
  - Land: 2.09 sq mi (5.41 km^{2})
  - Water: 0.0039 sq mi (0.01 km^{2})
- Elevation: 240 ft (73 m)

Population (2020)
  - Total: 17,629
  - Density: 8,433.6/sq mi (3,256.24/km^{2})
- Time zone: UTC−5 (EST)
  - Summer (DST): UTC−4 (EDT)
- ZIP Code: 20912
- Area codes: 301, 240
- FIPS code: 24-76650
- GNIS feature ID: 2390660
- Website: takomaparkmd.gov

Takoma Park is a city in Montgomery County, Maryland, United States. It is a suburb of Washington, D.C., and part of the Washington metropolitan area. Founded in 1883 and incorporated in 1890, Takoma Park, informally called "Azalea City", is a Tree City USA and a nuclear-free zone. A planned commuter suburb, it is situated along the Metropolitan Branch of the historic Baltimore and Ohio Railroad, just northeast of Washington, D.C., and it shares a border and history with the adjacent Washington, D.C. neighborhood of Takoma. It is governed by an elected mayor and six elected councilmembers, who form the city council, and an appointed city manager, under a council-manager style of government. The city's population was 17,629 at the 2020 United States census.

Since 2013, residents of Takoma Park can vote in municipal elections when they turn sixteen. It was the first city in the United States to extend voting rights to 16- and 17-year-olds in city elections. Since then, the City of Hyattsville has followed suit.

== History ==
=== 19th century ===
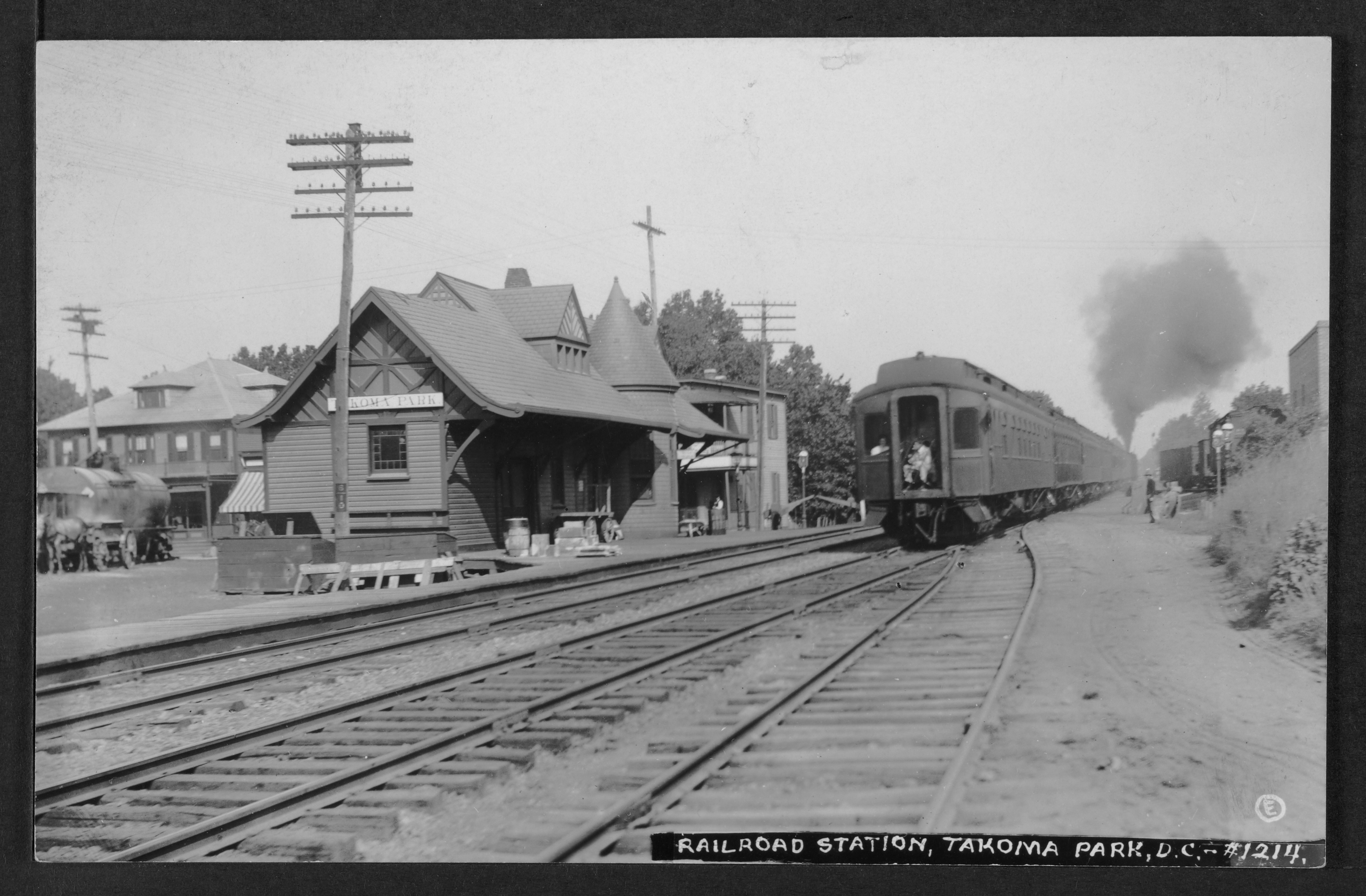
Postcard depicting Takoma Park railway station and B&O steam locomotive, 1910

Takoma Park was founded by Benjamin Franklin Gilbert in 1883. It was one of the first planned Victorian commuter suburbs, centered on the B&O railroad station in Takoma, D.C., and bore aspects of a spa and trolley park.

Takoma was originally the name of Mount Rainier, from Lushootseed [təqʷúbəʔ] (earlier *təqʷúməʔ), "snow-covered mountain". At Gilbert's suggestion, the name was chosen in 1883 by DC resident Ida Summy, who believed it to mean "high up" or "near heaven". The city of Tacoma in Washington state is also named after the mountain.

Gilbert first purchased land in spring 1884: A 100-acre (0.40 km^{2}) plot called Robert's Choice from G.C. Grammar. The plot, which included land on both sides of the B&O's Metropolitan Branch rail line, was roughly bounded by today's Sixth Street on the west, Aspen Street on the south, Willow Avenue on the east, and Takoma Avenue on the north. At the time, much of the land was covered by thick forest. Gilbert cleared some of it to lay out and grade streets and housing lots. Most lots measured 50 by 200 feet (15 by 60 m) and were sold for $327 to $653 per acre. By August 1885, about 100 people were living in Takoma Park, including temporary summer residents and permanent residents. Gilbert lived in a wooden house on a stone foundation, with 20 rooms and a 65-foot (20 m) tower.

In 1886, Gilbert purchased another plot of land, roughly bounded by Carroll Avenue to the Big Spring (now Takoma Junction) and what is now Woodland Avenue. Gilbert named this land New Takoma. Gilbert later purchased the Jones farm and the Naughton farm, which together he named North Takoma. He also purchased land from Francis P. Blair, Richard L. T. Beale, and the Riggs family.

Gilbert hired contractor Fred E. Dudley to build many of the homes in Takoma Park. A house designed by Leon E. Dessez at Piney Branch Road and Eastern Avenue became the home of Cady Lee. Dudley's son Wentworth was the first child born in Takoma Park.

The community had 75 houses by 1888 and 235 homes by 1889. That year, Gilbert purchased several acres of land along Sligo Creek from a Dr. R.C. Flower, a Boston physician, to build a sanitarium. By this point, Takoma Park stretched 1,500 acres (5 km^{2}).

The deed of each of the original houses prohibited alcohol from being made or sold on the property, a prohibition that continued in the city until 1983. Takoma Park incorporated as a town on April 3, 1890. The first town election was held on May 5, 1890, and Gilbert was elected mayor and J. Vance Lewis, George H. Bailey, Daniel Smith, and Frederick J. Lung were elected to the town council.

The Watkins Hotel was built in 1892. A fire destroyed the town's recently built commercial district and the Watkins Hotel in 1893. Gilbert's North Takoma Hotel was built later that year, advertising the pure spring water nearby its 160 rooms.

Many of the streets were originally known as avenues. When the Commissioners of the District of Columbia mandated a District-wide street-naming system, those on the District side were renamed streets but retained their names otherwise. Other streets in Takoma, D.C., were renamed entirely. Susquehanna Avenue became Whittier Street. Tahoe Street was renamed Aspen Street. Umatilla Street became Aspen Street. Vermilion Street became Cedar Street. Wabash Street was renamed Dahlia Street. Aspin became Elder Street. Magnolia Street became Eastern Avenue.

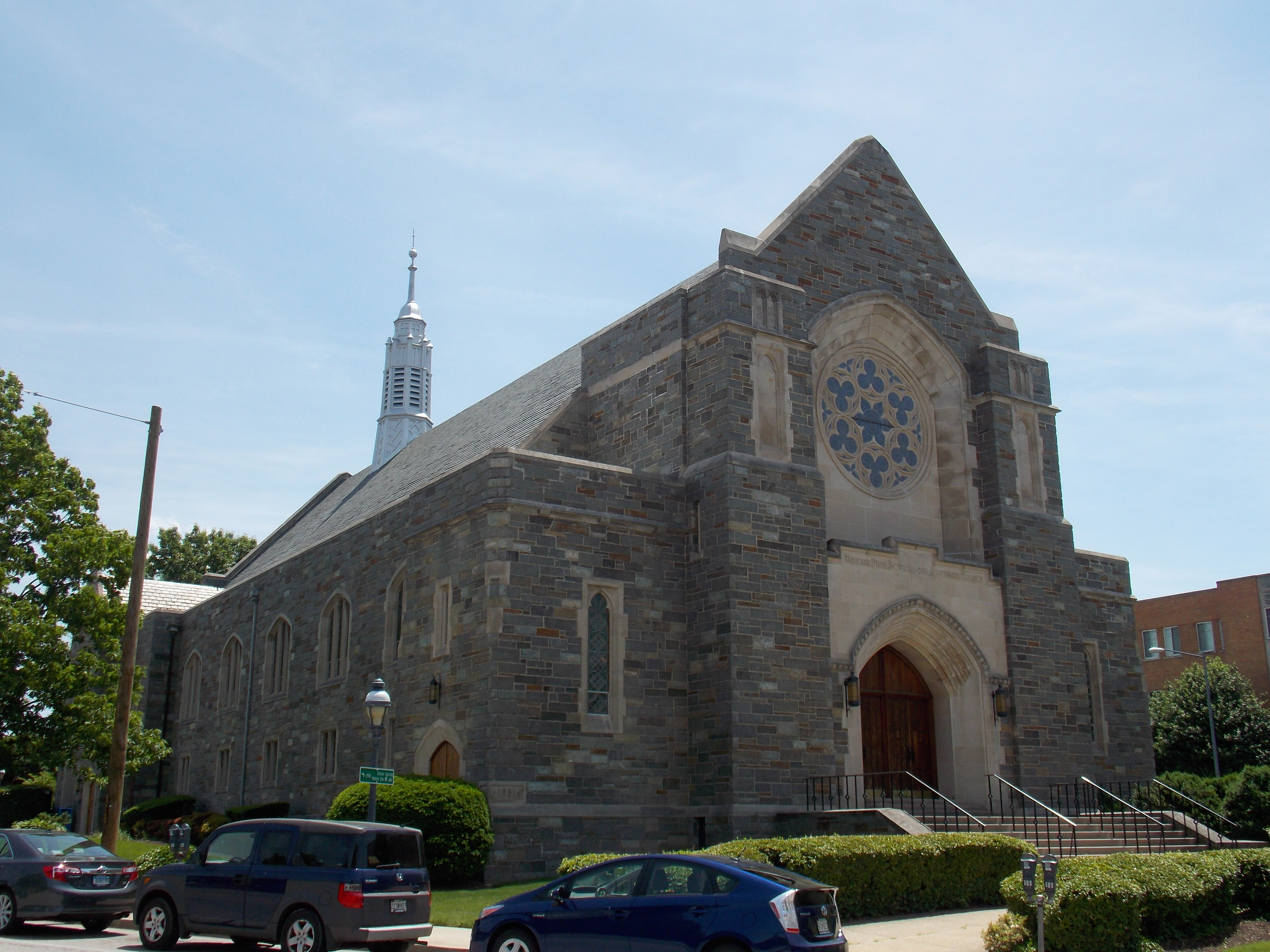
Takoma Park Seventh-day Adventist Church

=== Early 20th century ===
In 1904, the Seventh-day Adventist Church purchased five acres of land in Takoma Park along Carroll Avenue, Laurel Avenue, and Willow Avenue. The land was located on both sides of the Maryland-District of Columbia border. The land was intended for a church, office building, printer, and residences for prominent members of the church. In 1903, the Seventh-day Adventist Church decided to move their headquarters to the Washington area after its headquarters' publishing house in Battle Creek, Michigan, had burned to the ground. The church decided that moving to a more urban setting would be a more appropriate place from which to increase the church's presence in the southern states. The church purchased fifty acres of land along Sligo Creek in Takoma Park to build the new headquarters. The land was away from downtown Washington and had clean water available from a natural spring located at present-day Spring Park. For many decades Takoma Park served as the world headquarters of the Seventh-day Adventist Church, until it moved to northern Silver Spring in 1989.

In 1908, North Takoma Hotel was bought by Louis Denton Bliss, who turned it into Bliss Electrical School. Months later, a fire destroyed the building, and Bliss rebuilt the school at another site. The school was eventually bought by Montgomery County where it became the site of Montgomery College's Takoma Park/Silver Spring campus.

=== Mid 20th century ===
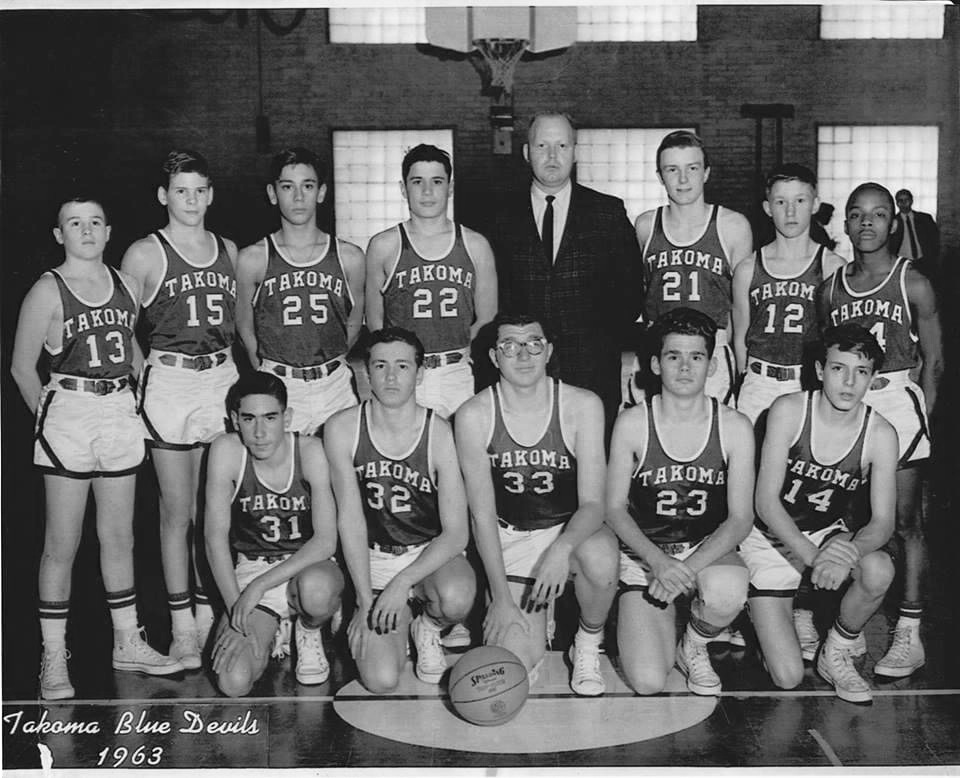
The Takoma Blue Devils in 1963.

In 1964, an inside-the-Capital-Beltway extension of Interstate 70S, also known as the North Central Freeway, was proposed via a route known as "Option #11 Railroad Sligo East," up to 1/4 mile parallel to the B&O railroad upon a swath of land displacing 471 houses, that would have cut the city in two. In the mid-to-late 1960s, the future mayor and civil rights activist Sammie Abbott led a campaign to halt freeway construction and replace it with a Metrorail line to the site of the former train station, and worked with other neighborhood groups to halt plans for a wider system of freeways going into and out of DC.

This controversy also raised the profile of Takoma Park at a time in the late 1960s and 1970s when it was becoming noted regionally and nationally for political activism outside the Nation's capital, with newspaper commentators describing it as "The People's Republic of Takoma Park" or "The Berkeley of the East". This era of activism extended into the 1980s, when Takoma Park declared itself a Nuclear-free zone and a sanctuary for Salvadoran and Guatemalan refugees.

Prior to the passage of the Fair Housing Act of 1968, restrictive covenants were used in Takoma Park to exclude African Americans, Jews, and others. Many Takoma Park subdivisions used anti-Black covenants and at least one subdivision used antisemitic covenants. A 1939 deed for the New Hampshire Avenue Highlands subdivision of Takoma Park reads: "No lot shall be leased, transferred, sold, occupied or conveyed to or for the use of any person or persons not wholly of Caucasian Race or blood, excluding Semites; but this covenant shall not prevent casual occupancy by domestic servants of a different race, employed by an owner or tenant." The first known restrictive covenant in Takoma Park was for a property in the Hillcrest subdivision in 1911. Subdivisions with restrictive covenants included Bonnie View, Carroll Farm, Carroll Manor, Fletcher's Addition, Flower Avenue Park, Green Hill Farms, Hampshire Knolls, Hillwood Manor, Wildwood and others.

Much of the old town Takoma Park was incorporated into the Takoma Park Historic District; listed on the National Register of Historic Places in 1976.

=== Late 20th and early 21st century ===
Before 1995, the eastern boundary of the city of Takoma Park was in Prince George's County, Maryland, causing the community to be divided across two counties and the Maryland/D.C. line (where the original downtown area is located). For several years, Takoma Park lobbied the State of Maryland for legislation allowing county boundaries to be adjusted. The State finally agreed to this change, with the stipulation that cross-county municipalities would no longer be allowed; the new municipal boundary would forever remain within the county of its choosing. In August 1995, after passage of the law, the city held a public referendum asking registered voters living in three Prince George's County neighborhoods north of New Hampshire Avenue whether they wanted to be annexed to the city of Takoma Park. There was a majority of votes, 219 out of 313, in favor of annexation to the city.

In November 1995, the state-sponsored referendum was held asking whether the portions of the city in Prince George's County should be annexed to Montgomery County, or vice versa. The majority of votes in the referendum were in favor of unification of the entire city in Montgomery County. Following subsequent approval by both counties' councils and the Maryland General Assembly, the county line was moved to include the entire city in Montgomery County (including territory in Prince George's County newly annexed by the city) on July 1, 1997. This process became known as Unification.

In 1981, Takoma Park passed the Rent stabilization Law, which limits the rent increase to a percentage set by the city and applies to all individual condominium units and multi-family rental facilities. This led to Takoma Park featuring some of the lowest rents in the D.C. region while similarly discouraging new multi-family housing construction, as evidenced by the lack of any new development in the city after the law passed.

The city experienced substantial gentrification in the 1990s and early 2000s (decade), with many houses containing apartments converted back into single-family homes. This process was encouraged by an M-NCPPC "phase back", effectively eliminating scattered-site multifamily housing and implementing single-use zoning in a majority of city neighborhoods. Nearly half of the city's population are tenants, 47.2% according to the Census Bureau's 2019 population estimate, many of whom live in a cluster of high-rise and mid-rise apartment buildings surrounding Sligo Creek, which cuts a deep valley through the community.

The City Council adopted the Takoma Park Safe Grow Act of 2013, which went into effect March 1, 2014, and bans synthetic pesticides and requires organic lawn management on all city lands.

In 2018, the City of Takoma Park proposed renaming streets that were named after generals who fought on either side in the United States Civil War, namely Grant Avenue, Lee Avenue, Sherman Avenue, Sheridan Avenue, and Jackson Avenue, though by 2026, no action had been taken.

== Geography ==
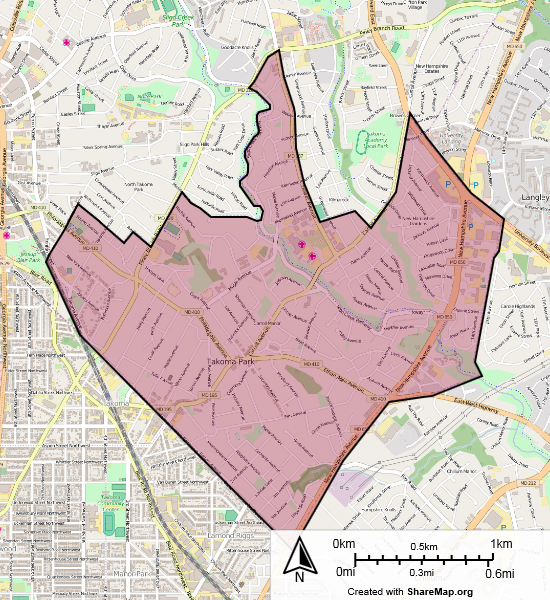
Map

Takoma Park sits on the edge of the Mid-Atlantic fall line and is thus quite hilly, with many narrow, gridded streets. According to the United States Census Bureau, the city has a total area of 2.09 square miles (5.41 km^{2}), including 0.01 square miles (0.03 km^{2}) of water: Sligo Creek and Long Branch, two tributaries of the Northwest Branch of the Anacostia River. The area is bisected by Sligo Creek Park and the 9-mile (14 km) Sligo Creek Trail. The main street, Carroll Avenue, and the main state highway, Route 410/East West Highway, narrow to two lanes within city limits. Takoma Park has an extensive hardwood tree canopy that is protected by local ordinance.

Takoma Park is bounded by downtown Silver Spring, a major urban center to the northwest; by Montgomery College campus and East Silver Spring, a community of houses, apartments and small shops, along Flower Avenue and Piney Branch Road, to the north; Langley Park, a community of apartments and shopping centers along University Boulevard, to the northeast; Chillum in Prince George's County to the southeast, bounded by New Hampshire Avenue, a state highway; and Takoma to the southwest, separated by Eastern Avenue, which follows the District of Columbia line.

The corner of Eastern and Carroll Avenues roughly marks the center of the old commercial district. Other town centers include: "Takoma Junction", the corner of Carroll Avenue and Route 410 in the geographic center of town, home to the city's large food co-op; Takoma-Langley Crossroads in downtown Langley Park, and the Flower shopping district, both of which are home to many immigrant-owned establishments. Takoma Park's municipal center is at the corner of Maple Avenue and Route 410. Washington Adventist University sits at the corner of Carroll and Flower Avenues.

=== Neighborhoods by ward ===
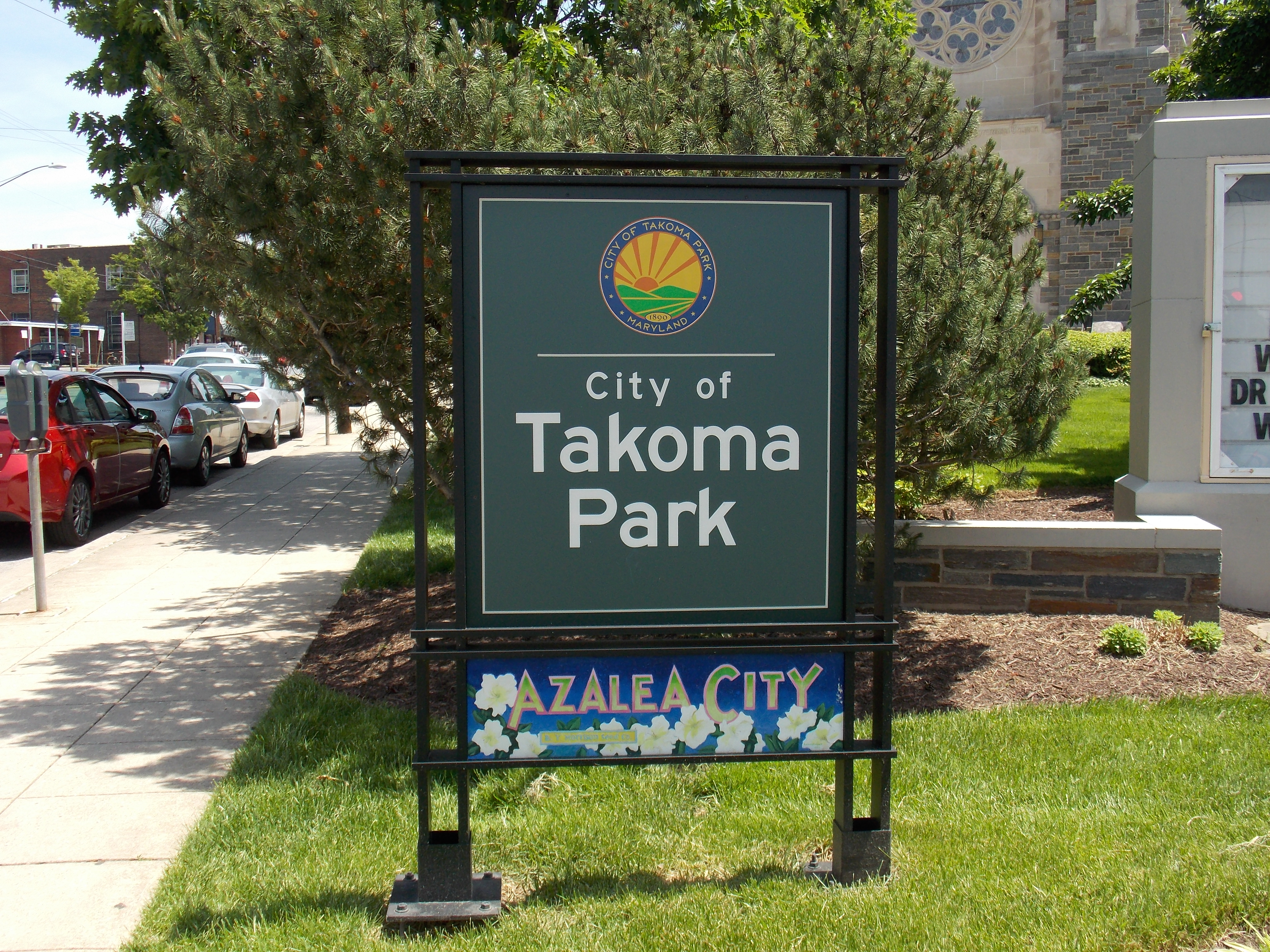
Welcome sign

Takoma Park has many small neighborhoods. In 2016, there were about fifty neighborhood listservs.

- Ward 1
  - Hodges Heights
  - Old Takoma a.k.a. the Philadelphia-Eastern Neighborhood
  - North Takoma
- Ward 2
  - B.F. Gilbert Subdivision (an extension of Old Town)
  - Glaizewood Manor
  - Long Branch-Sligo
  - South of Sligo
- Ward 3
  - SS Carroll Neighborhood, named after the addition made by Samuel S. Carroll Also known "The Generals" streets: Grant Ave, Lee Ave, Sherman Ave, Sheridan Ave.
  - Pinecrest
  - Takoma Junction
  - Westmoreland Area
- Ward 4
  - Maple Ave apartment district
  - Ritchie Ave
  - SS Carroll Neighborhood
- Ward 5
  - Between the Creeks (part of the greater Long Branch / East Silver Spring area centered along Flower Ave)
- Ward 6
  - Hillwood Manor
  - New Hampshire Gardens

=== Takoma Avenue Historic District ===
The Takoma Avenue Historic District is a national historic district. All five houses were constructed in 1951, are identical in their layout and construction, and were designed by Charles M. Goodman.

== Demographics ==
Historical population
| Census | Pop. | Note | %± |
|---|---|---|---|
| 1890 | 164 | | — |
| 1900 | 756 | | 361.0% |
| 1910 | 1,242 | | 64.3% |
| 1920 | 3,168 | | 155.1% |
| 1930 | 6,415 | | 102.5% |
| 1940 | 8,938 | | 39.3% |
| 1950 | 13,341 | | 49.3% |
| 1960 | 16,799 | | 25.9% |
| 1970 | 18,507 | | 10.2% |
| 1980 | 16,231 | | −12.3% |
| 1990 | 16,700 | | 2.9% |
| 2000 | 17,299 | | 3.6% |
| 2010 | 16,715 | | −3.4% |
| 2020 | 17,629 | | 5.5% |
U.S. Decennial Census; 2010–2020

=== 2020 census ===
As of the 2020 census, Takoma Park had a population of 17,629. The median age was 40.4 years. 24.3% of residents were under the age of 18 and 15.5% of residents were 65 years of age or older. For every 100 females there were 89.9 males, and for every 100 females age 18 and over there were 86.7 males age 18 and over.

100.0% of residents lived in urban areas, while 0.0% lived in rural areas.

There were 6,878 households in Takoma Park, of which 36.5% had children under the age of 18 living in them. Of all households, 45.9% were married-couple households, 17.8% were households with a male householder and no spouse or partner present, and 31.4% were households with a female householder and no spouse or partner present. About 29.5% of all households were made up of individuals and 11.7% had someone living alone who was 65 years of age or older.

There were 7,161 housing units, of which 4.0% were vacant. The homeowner vacancy rate was 0.6% and the rental vacancy rate was 3.4%.

Racial composition as of the 2020 census
| Race | Number | Percent |
|---|---|---|
| White | 7,683 | 43.6% |
| Black or African American | 5,621 | 31.9% |
| American Indian and Alaska Native | 116 | 0.7% |
| Asian | 816 | 4.6% |
| Native Hawaiian and Other Pacific Islander | 10 | 0.1% |
| Some other race | 1,410 | 8.0% |
| Two or more races | 1,973 | 11.2% |
| Hispanic or Latino (of any race) | 2,764 | 15.7% |

=== 2010 census ===
As of the census of 2010, there were 16,715 people, 6,569 households, and 3,904 families residing in the city. The population density was 8,036.1 inhabitants per square mile (3,102.8/km^{2}). There were 7,162 housing units at an average density of 3,443.3 per square mile (1,329.5/km^{2}). The racial makeup of the city was 49.0% White, 35.0% African American, 0.3% Native American, 4.4% Asian, 0.1% Pacific Islander, 6.5% from other races, and 4.8% from two or more races. Hispanic or Latino of any race were 14.5% of the population.

There were 6,569 households, of which 33.6% had children under the age of 18 living with them, 40.9% were married couples living together, 14.2% had a female householder with no husband present, 4.3% had a male householder with no wife present, and 40.6% were non-families. 31.0% of all households were made up of individuals, and 8.7% had someone living alone who was 65 years of age or older. The average household size was 2.49 and the average family size was 3.12.

The median age in the city was 38 years. 22.4% of residents were under the age of 18; 8.1% were between the ages of 18 and 24; 30.8% were from 25 to 44; 28.7% were from 45 to 64; and 10% were 65 years of age or older. The gender makeup of the city was 46.6% male and 53.4% female.

=== 2000 census ===
As of the census of 2000, there were 17,299 people, 6,893 households, and 3,949 families residing in the city. The population density was 8,152.4 inhabitants per square mile (3,147.7/km^{2}). There were 7,187 housing units at an average density of 3,387.0 per square mile (1,307.7/km^{2}). The racial makeup of the city was 48.79% White, 33.97% African American, 0.44% Native American, 4.36% Asian, 0.03% Pacific Islander, 7.44% from other races, and 4.97% from two or more races. Hispanic or Latino of any race were 14.42% of the population.

There were 6,893 households, out of which 30.8% had children under the age of 18 living with them, 38.5% were married couples living together, 14.2% had a female householder with no husband present, and 42.7% were non-families. Approximately 4.5% of all couples were unmarried same sex couples. 32.2% of all households were made up of individuals, and 7.9% had someone living alone who was 65 years of age or older. The average household size was 2.44 and the average family size was 3.13.

In the city, the population was spread out, with 23.6% under the age of 18, 8.8% from 18 to 24, 35.9% from 25 to 44, 23.0% from 45 to 64, and 8.8% who were 65 years of age or older. The median age was 36 years. For every 100 females, there were 89.1 males. For every 100 females age 18 and over, there were 85.9 males.

The median income for a household in the city was $48,490, and the median income for a family was $63,434. Males had a median income of $40,668 versus $35,073 for females. The per capita income for the city was $26,437. About 8.4% of families and 10.3% of the population were below the poverty line, including 10.5% of those under age 18 and 20.5% of those age 65 or over.

== Economy ==
The city's fiscal 2023 Comprehensive Annual Financial Report said the top employers in the city are:

| # | Employer | Employees |
|---|---|---|
| 1 | Montgomery College | 775 |
| 2 | Montgomery County Public Schools | 248 |
| 3 | City of Takoma Park, Maryland | 244 |
| 4 | Washington Adventist University | 121 |
| 5 | Don Bosco Cristo Rey High School | 75 |
| 6 | Takoma Park / Silver Spring Co-Op | 46 |
| 7 | International House of Pancakes | 36 |
| 8 | Taco Bell | 27 |
| 9 | Chuck E. Cheese | 26 |
| 10 | Mid Atlantic Seafood | 18 |

== Arts and culture ==
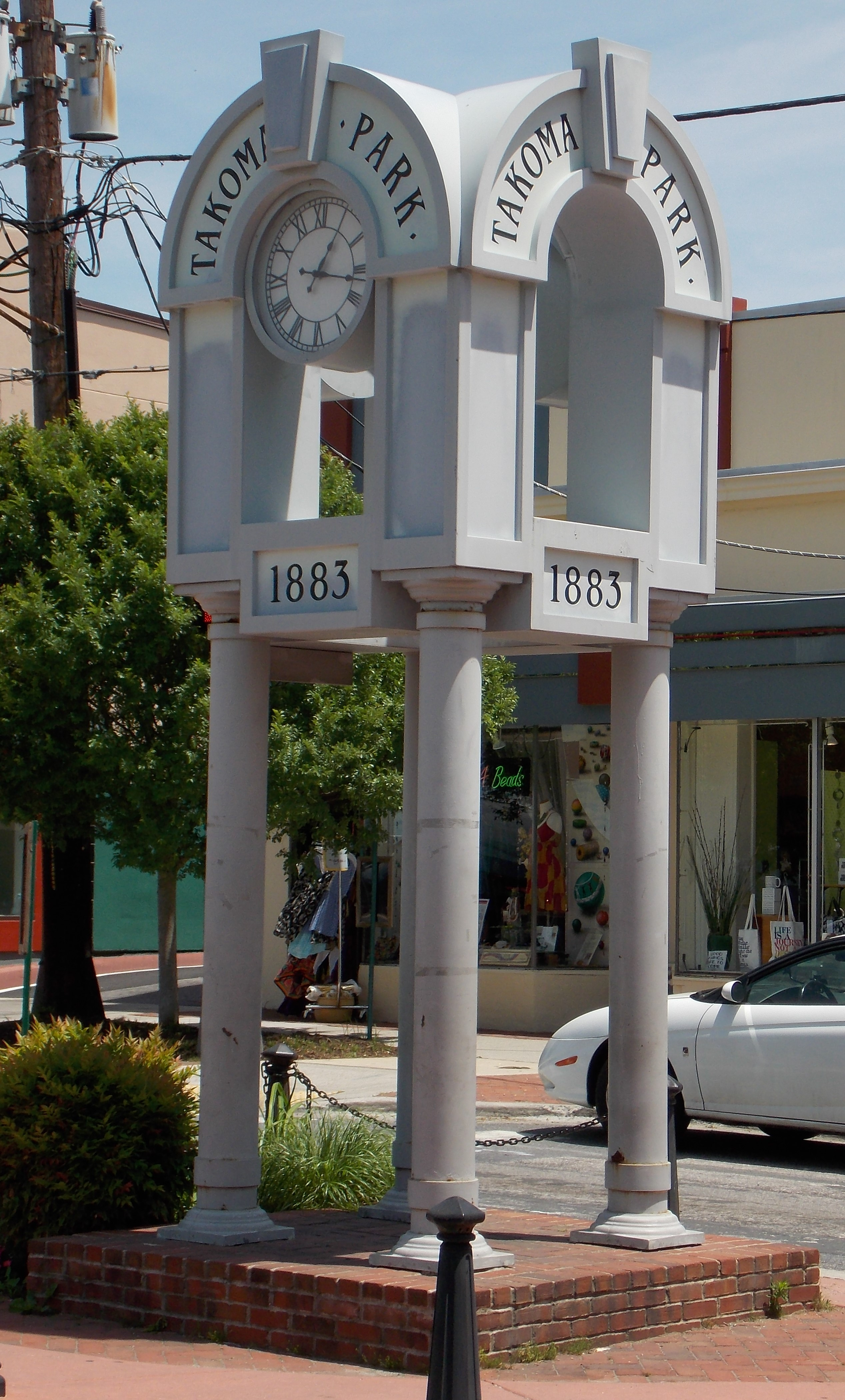
Takoma Park clock at Ward Sinclair Plaza

Takoma Park was the home of blues guitarist John Fahey (1939-2001), who helped popularize the city as a haven for folk musicians. He named his label Takoma Records for the city, and many of his songs allude to local landmarks. Mary Chapin Carpenter, Al Petteway (composer of Sligo Creek), and other local and national artists have made their home in and around Takoma Park. Musician Root Boy Slim and actor Goldie Hawn are from Takoma Park.

The city's cultural events include the Takoma Park Folk Festival, which attracts an audience from across the Mid-Atlantic region. Held annually since 1978, it is a free festival with local musicians on six stages. Performers range from well-seasoned stage veterans to youngsters on stage for the first time, and the music spans genres from old-time fiddle and bluegrass to acoustic folk-rock to Afro-Latin fusion. The festival also includes children's activities, a juried crafts show, and community tables where local organizations and politicians reach out to the community. It was founded by Sam Abbott, a civil-rights activist and former mayor of the city. Other annual festivals include the mildly countercultural Takoma Park Street Festival, the Takoma Jazz Fest, and the Takoma Park Independent Film Festival.

The Takoma Park Fourth of July Parade, attended by residents and politicians from across the metropolitan region, typically includes ethnic musical troupes representing a wide variety of global cultures, neighborhood performance troupes, and groups supporting causes, such as LGBTQ and fair trade.

The Flower Theater and the 500-seat Takoma Theater anchor either end of town. In 2008, the Takoma Theatre Conservancy attempted to renovate the theater as a multiuse space.

Takoma Park is home to the Dance Exchange (founded by Liz Lerman) and the Institute of Musical Traditions, a performance society founded by the House of Musical Traditions. Kinetic Artistry, a theatre supplier for the Washington area, is located in Takoma Park.

WOWD-LP 94.3 FM is a hyperlocal radio station.

Nearby Takoma, D.C. is home to the A.Salon Building, a large art studio warehouse and former printing plant that now houses the backstage office and rehearsal center for the Washington National Opera.

Takoma Park has been home to local characters who have contributed to the city's sense of identity and culture, including "Catman" and Motor Cat, Roscoe the Rooster, The Banjo Man, and "Fox Man", a local animal-rights activist and founder of the city's Tool Library.

Takoma Park has a year-round farmer's market and two other farmers markets which sell local produce and free-range meats.

Several local newspapers have served the community, including The Voice and the satirical Takoma Torch.

=== Libraries ===
- Takoma Park Maryland Library is one of the few municipal libraries in suburban Maryland.
- Takoma Park Library, part of the District of Columbia Public Library system, was the first neighborhood library in Washington, D.C., and a Carnegie library.
- Long Branch Library in Silver Spring is part of the Montgomery County Public Libraries.

=== Institutions ===
The Sam Abbott Citizens Center, Takoma Park's former city auditorium, has been refurbished as a community theater and gallery. The municipal center, which includes the Takoma Park City Hall, Citizens Center and the Takoma Park Maryland Library, was expanded into a community center from 2003–2007. A gymnasium was requested by the city's youth sports leagues after lobbying from Steve Francis, the NBA basketball player, who grew up in Takoma Park; but funding was not identified. A small fenced-in basketball court has since been built next to the community center.

In 2010, the Seventh-Day Adventist Church received authorization to move the regional Washington Adventist Hospital from the center of town to an outlying area of nearby Silver Spring, Maryland, alongside its international headquarters and the Adventist Book and Health Food Store, which had also been located within city limits. It was renamed Adventist Healthcare White Oak Medical Center. This had followed an effort by county officials to close or move the city's fire station, located on the side of a steep hill. After outcry, the City Council retained the old Hospital facility as a "health campus." The hospital overlooking Sligo Creek had been in operation since 1907, when it was founded as the Washington Sanitarium. Officials also successfully lobbied to retain a university on the same campus, which has been renamed Washington Adventist University.

In the 1970s, the city sought to expand or move Montgomery College, which has a campus in the historic district of North Takoma, an area of large old homes next to downtown Silver Spring. After outcry, the County agreed to preserve the existing campus, and expand toward downtown Silver Spring by building a bridge across the B&O railroad tracks. It was renamed the "Takoma Park-Silver Spring Campus," focused on health, nursing and the arts. The expanded campus included a new arts center located in South Silver Spring, near the boundary between the three jurisdictions.

The Takoma Park-Silver Spring Food Co-op is one of the Washington area's largest food co-ops.

The Takoma Park Presbyterian Church, long a bulwark of civic activism, helped to found CASA de Maryland.

In the late 2000s, regional and national debate occurred over the decision to close Walter Reed Army Medical Center in Takoma, D.C., and move its operations to the Bethesda Naval Medical Center.

Takoma Park Soccer Club is the sponsor of many youth soccer teams in the Takoma Park area, such as the TAPK United, coached by professional Brazilian coach Manilton Santos. A successful team, they have earned the affectionate nickname Tapioca United.

== Government ==
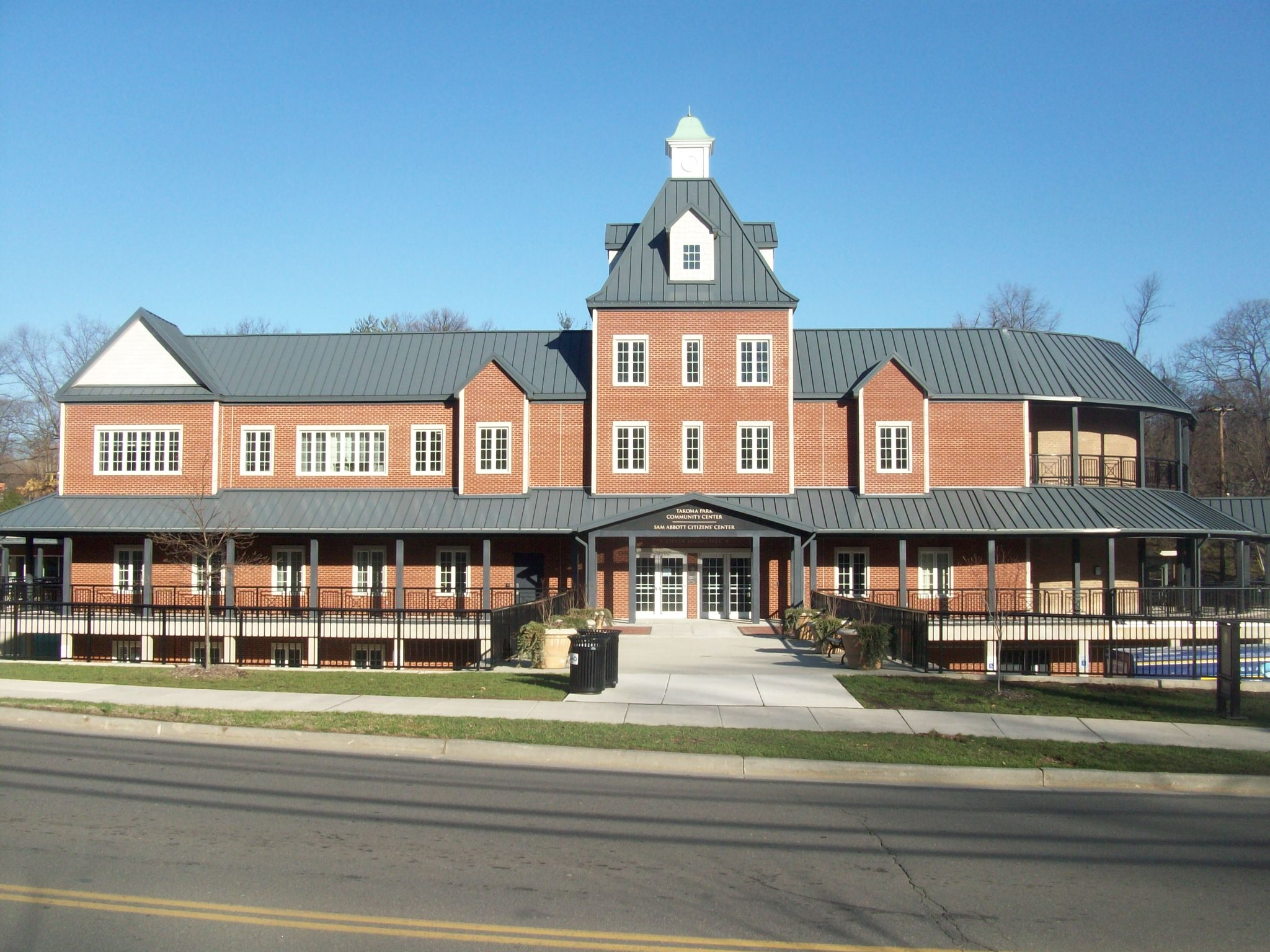
Takoma Park Community Center

Takoma Park's electorate and its elected officials are known for their liberal and left-of-liberal values, which have led to the enactment of several municipal laws. For instance, Takoma Park has allowed non-U.S.-citizen residents to vote in its own municipal elections since 1993, and has lowered the voting age for city elections to 16. The city was also forbidden, by statute, from doing business with any entity having commercial ties with the government of Burma (Myanmar), though after a U.S. Supreme Court decision struck down a similar Massachusetts law, enforcement of the provision was suspended in the year 2000. As of 2007, the Free Burma Committee is inactive. In 2008, the city unanimously approved a resolution to oppose foie gras. Takoma Park is the only Maryland municipality with a rent control law.

Like a handful of other U.S. municipalities, Takoma Park has declared itself a "nuclear free zone"; under a 1983 law, contractors working for the city must also sign a notarized document that they are not "knowingly or intentionally" "engaged in the development, research, production, maintenance, storage, transportation and/or disposal of nuclear weapons or their components." Waivers have been given in the past, including a 2012 waiver to purchase a library system from Userful Corporation that includes computers made by Hewlett-Packard, a company that has also worked on nuclear weapons programs for the federal government.

Under a local ordinance, Takoma Park residents must obtain a permit or waiver from the City arborist ("urban forest manager") to cut down any tree on their property with a diameter of 7 5/8 inches or greater. The minutes of all Takoma Park City Council meetings are available on the Takoma Park City website.

=== Mayor ===
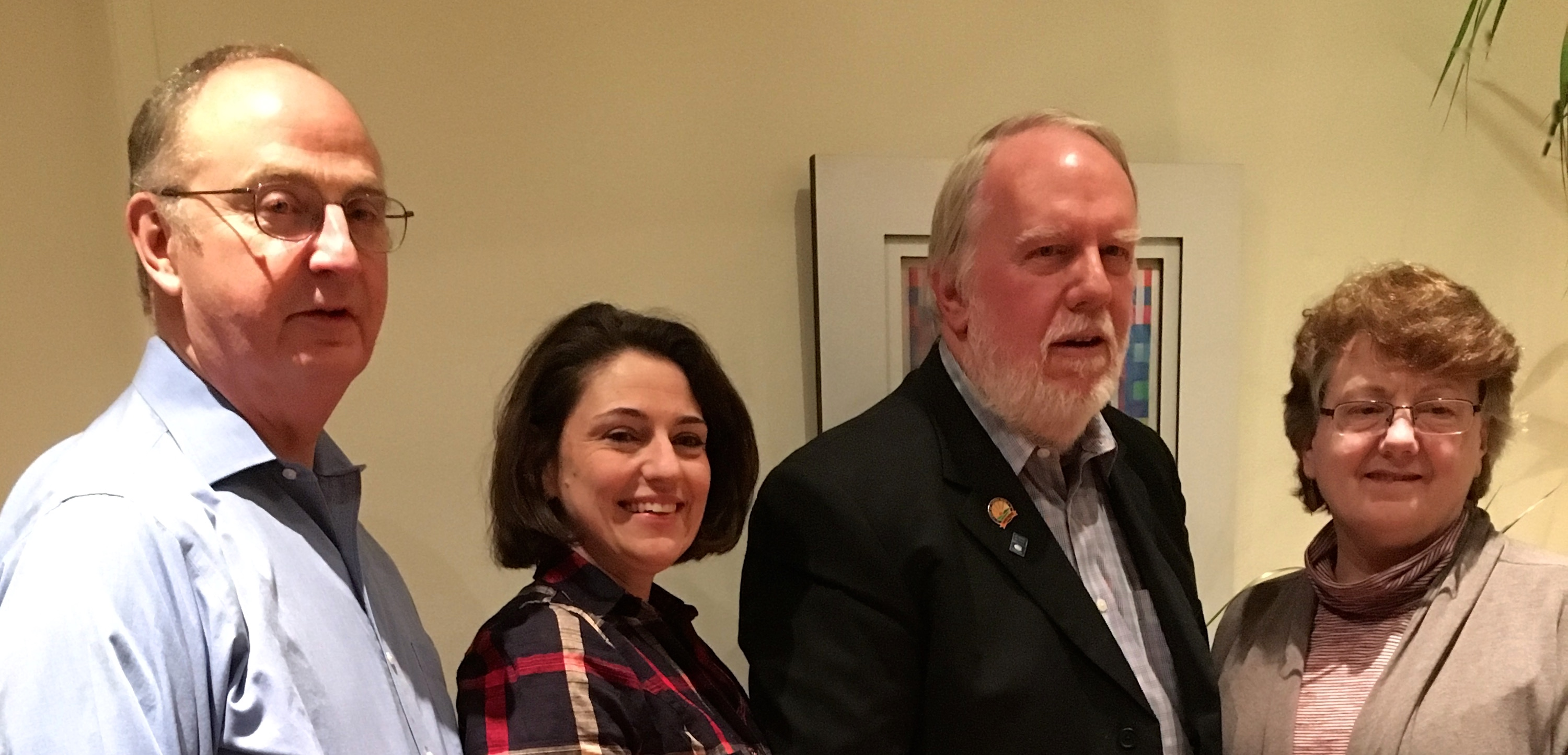
(left to right): Ed Sharp (mayor 1990-7), Kate Stewart (mayor 2015-22), Bruce Williams (mayor 2007-15), Kathy Porter (mayor 1997-07) at a dinner party in 2017

Takoma Park is governed by a city council composed of a mayor and council members for each of six wards. The current mayor of Takoma Park (the 24th) is Talisha Searcy (mayor since 2022).

Former mayors of Takoma Park
| Number | Name | Entered office | Left office |
|---|---|---|---|
| 1 | Benjamin Franklin Gilbert | 1890 | 1892 |
| 2 | Enoch Maris | 1892 | 1894 |
| 3 | Samuel S. Shedd | 1894 | 1902 |
| 4 | John B. Kinnear | 1902 | 1906 |
| 5 | Wilmer G. Platt | 1906 | 1912 |
| 6 | Stephen W. Williams | 1912 | 1917 |
| 7 | Wilmer G. Platt | 1917 | 1920 |
| 8 | James L. Wilmeth | 1920 | 1923 |
| 9 | Henry Taff | 1923 | 1926 |
| 10 | Ben G. Davis | 1926 | 1932 |
| 11 | Frederick L. Lewton | 1932 | 1936 |
| 12 | John R. Adams | 1936 | 1940 |
| 13 | Oliver W. Youngblood | 1940 | 1948 |
| 14 | John C. Post | 1948 | 1950 |
| 15 | Ross H. Beville | 1950 | 1954 |
| 16 | George M. Miller | 1954 | 1972 |
| 17 | John D. Roth | 1972 | 1980 |
| 18 | Sammie Abbott | 1980 | 1985 |
| 19 | Stephen J. Del Giudice | 1985 | 1990 |
| 20 | Edward F. Sharp | 1990 | 1997 |
| 21 | Kathy Porter | 1997 | 2007 |
| 22 | Bruce Williams | 2007 | 2015 |
| 23 | Kate Stewart | 2015 | 2022 |
| 24 | Talisha Searcy | 2022 | |

=== Voting ===
In the November 5, 1991, election the voters approved a referendum (1,199 for and 1,107 against) to change the Takoma Park City Charter "to permit residents of Takoma Park who are not U.S. citizens to vote in Takoma Park elections."

In the 2005 election, an advisory referendum to adopt instant-runoff voting (IRV, also called "ranked choice voting") for municipal elections passed with 84% approval. In 2006, the City Council amended the City Charter to incorporate IRV, making Takoma Park one of a small but growing number of municipalities across the nation to adopt IRV (and the first in Maryland to do so).

In the 2009 election, Takoma Park used the Scantegrity voting system. This marked the first time an open source voting system was used in a public sector election in the United States, as well as the first time a system with end-to-end verifiability was used.

In 2013, Takoma Park became the first city in the U.S. to allow sixteen- and seventeen-year-olds to vote.

Convicted felons on parole and probation were also given the right to vote in Takoma Park elections in 2013.

In 2017, the Takoma Park City Council changed the City Charter to schedule City elections in even numbered years (called "Election Synchronization") beginning in 2020. The Council elected in 2017 would serve a three-year term.

In 2020, Takoma Park held its first ever vote-by-mail election, with 6549 ballots counted, more than 2 1/2 times the number of votes in the 2015 and 2017 elections.

=== Federal government ===
The United States Postal Service operates the Takoma Park Post Office, as well as the Langley Park Post Office; the latter has a Hyattsville, Maryland postal address.

== Education ==
=== Primary and secondary schools ===
==== Public schools ====
The city is served by the Montgomery County Public Schools.

Elementary schools that serve the city include:

- Piney Branch Elementary School (3–5)
- Rolling Terrace Elementary School (PK–5)
- Sligo Creek Elementary School (K–5)
- Takoma Park Elementary School (PK–2)

Most Takoma Park residents are zoned to Takoma Park ES and Piney Branch. Sligo Creek Elementary School has new boundaries that no longer include students living in Takoma Park. SCES has a French Immersion program open to all Montgomery County families via lottery.

Middle schools that serve the city include:

- Silver Spring International Middle School
- Takoma Park Middle School, (most Takoma Park residents are zoned to Takoma Park MS)

All of the city is served by Montgomery Blair High School. With the Downcounty Consortium, students have limited opportunity to enroll in one of four other schools, including Kennedy, Northwood, Einstein, and Wheaton.

Prior to the mid-1990s sections of the Takoma Park census-designated place were zoned to Prince George's County Public Schools (PGCPS). These sections are now designated as being in the Chillum CDP index map. PG County Takoma Park CDP is shown on pages 7 and 12. From 1950 to 1964, during the era of legally-required racial segregation of schools, black students from the PG County section of Takoma Park attended Fairmont Heights High School, then near Fairmount Heights.

==== Private ====
- John Nevins Andrews School, a K–8 Seventh-day Adventist Christian School.
- Don Bosco Cristo Rey High School, a private Catholic high-school.
- Takoma Academy, a private Adventist Education high-school.

=== Colleges and universities ===
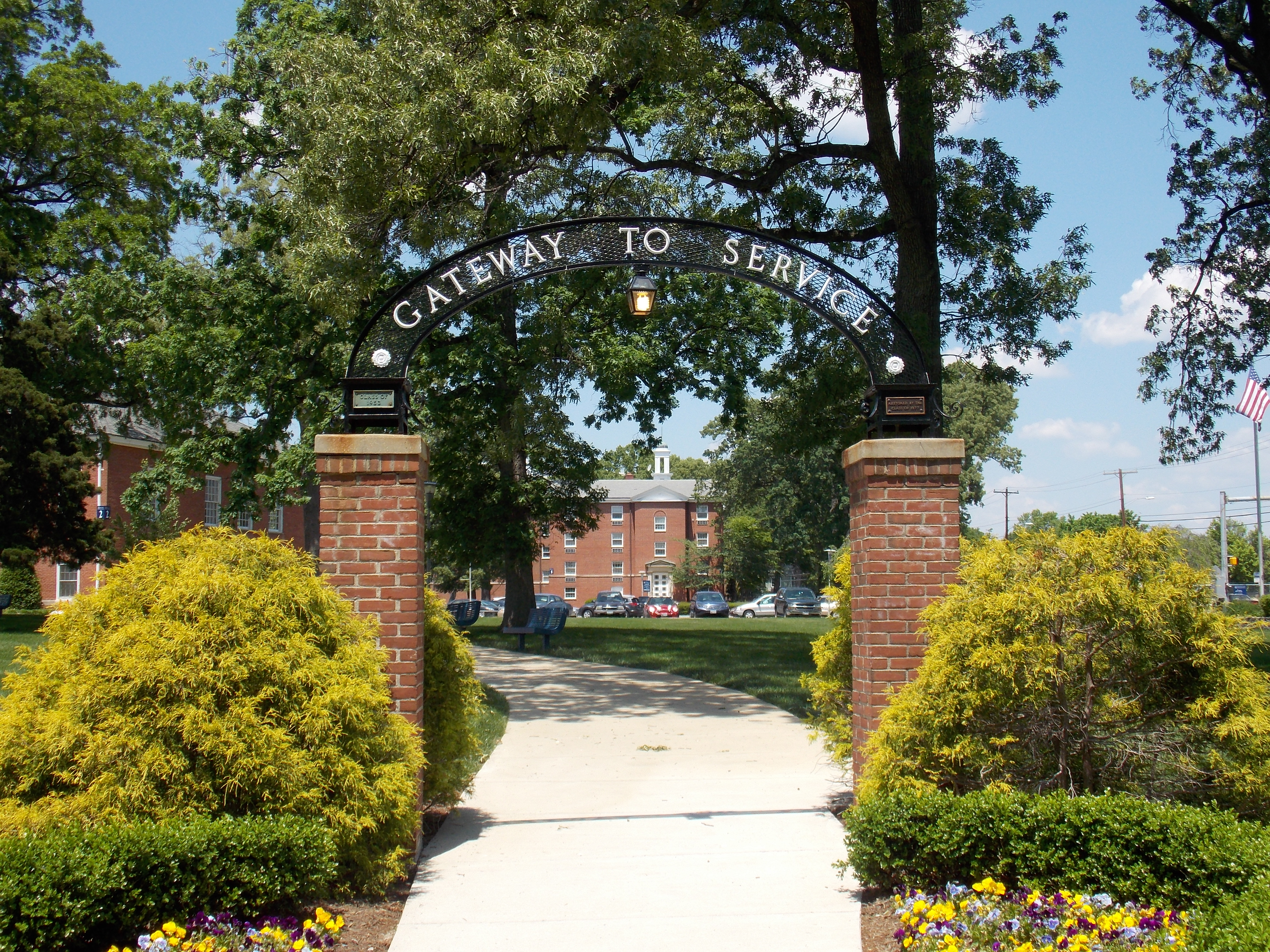
Washington Adventist University

- Washington Adventist University, a private liberal arts university
- Montgomery College (Takoma Park/Silver Spring Campus) (a 2-year institution)

== Police ==
Takoma Park is chartered with its own police force, public works department, housing department, library, and recreation department. It has also historically maintained its own Volunteer Fire Department and Municipal Library. Until 2007, the city operated a Tool Library as well, and continues to operate its own compost recycling program and silo for corn-burning stoves. Takoma Park is densely developed with narrow houses on deep lots, often featuring mid-block developments and a mix of apartments and homes which are no longer permitted under regional suburban zoning laws, under which many apartments were de-zoned in 1989.

== Transportation ==
=== Roads and highways ===
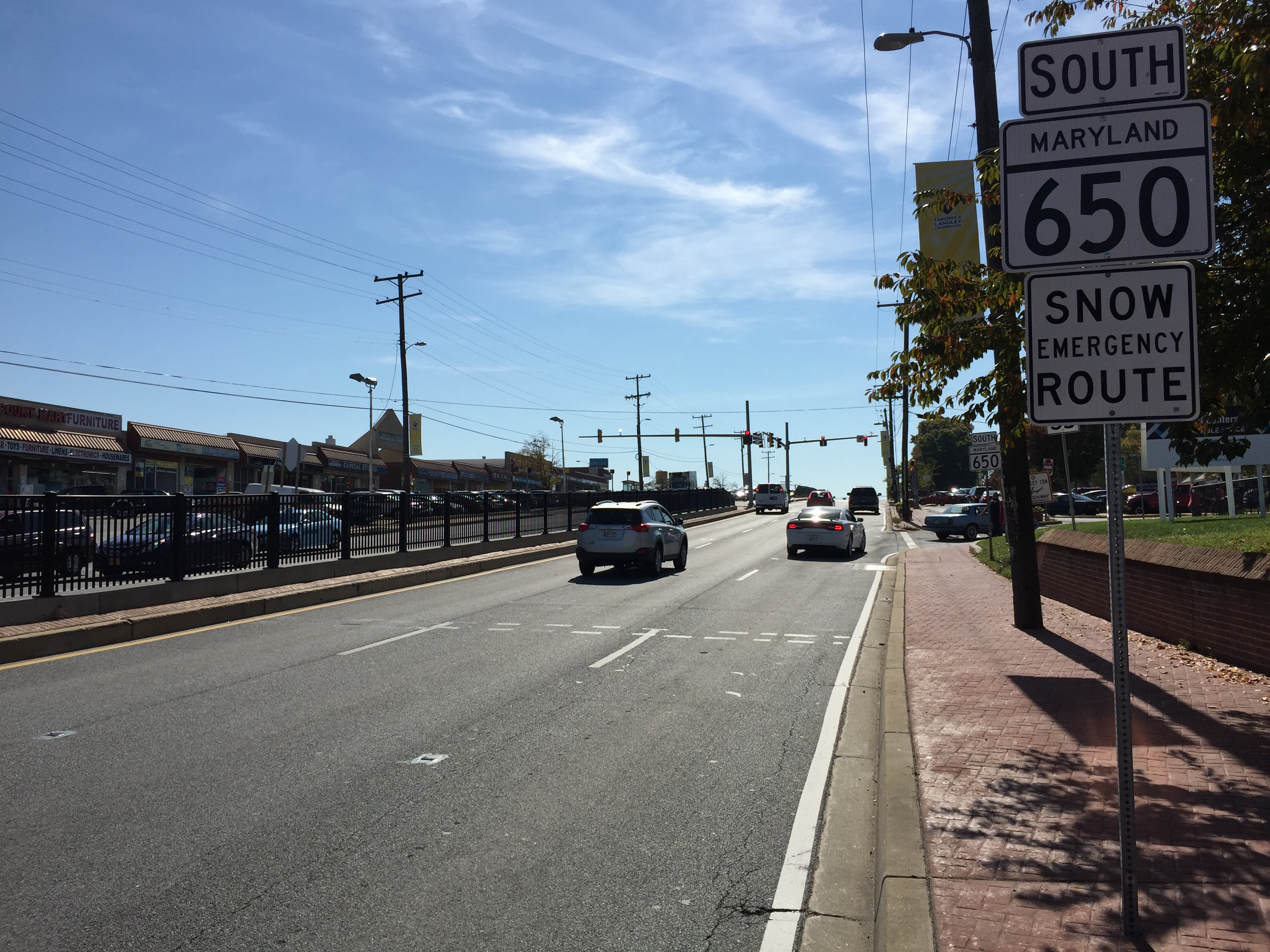
MD 650 southbound in Takoma Park

Several state highways serve Takoma Park. The largest of these is Maryland Route 650 (New Hampshire Avenue), which is the only six-lane thoroughfare running within city limits. New Hampshire Avenue continues into central Washington, D.C. and primarily serves through-traffic to the east of the city. Maryland Route 193 (University Boulevard) serves as the major suburban shopping strip, skirting the city on its northeast edge. Other state highways serving Takoma Park include Maryland Route 410, Maryland Route 320 and Maryland Route 195, all of which serve as local connectors to neighboring areas.

=== Public transportation ===
Being part of Montgomery County, Takoma Park is served by both the Ride On bus system, and by the Washington Metropolitan Area Transit Authority, which provides bus and rail service to the Maryland and Virginia suburbs of Washington, D.C.

The Takoma Metrorail station, also a Ride On and Metrobus hub, sits in the heart of the Old Takoma Main Street, in Washington, D.C., two blocks from the Maryland line.

The Takoma Langley Crossroads Transit Center is situated just outside the city border, at the intersection of University Boulevard and New Hampshire Avenue, also a location for a future Purple Line station.

The 9-mile (14 km) Sligo Creek Trail is used for recreation by bicyclists and pedestrians, and much of the roadway segment within the City of Takoma Park is closed to motor vehicles Fridays through Sundays. The Takoma Park segment of the Metropolitan Branch Trail, a rail trail that parallels the Red Line, is complete. Trail-building is planned to connect that segment with the completed portion that runs south to Washington Union Station and to planned segments running north to Silver Spring, Maryland with a connection to the 12-mile (19 km) Capital Crescent Trail.

== Notable people ==
- Danielle Allen, classicist and political scientist
- Henry Allen, author, artist
- Roger MacBride Allen, novelist
- Tom Brosius, track and field athlete
- Maia Campbell, former actress, singer and model
- Mary Chapin Carpenter, singer-songwriter
- Lorig Charkoudian, Maryland State Delegate, District 20
- David Corn, journalist
- Tommy Davidson, comedian, actor
- Dominique Dawes, three-time women's Olympic gymnastics team member
- Peabo Doue, soccer player
- Matt Drudge, political commentator, creator and editor of the Drudge Report
- Marc Elrich, Montgomery County Executive
- John Fahey, guitarist; founder of Takoma Records
- Peter Franchot, former Maryland State Comptroller
- Steve Francis, former National Basketball Association player
- Goldie Hawn, actress
- Bowie Kuhn, Commissioner of Baseball from 1969–1984, was born in Takoma Park.
- Denis McDonough, White House chief of staff in the Obama Administration, Secretary of Veterans Affairs in the Biden Administration
- Mona Minkara, chemist at Northeastern University
- Heather Mizeur, former Maryland State Delegate; candidate in Democratic primary for governor in 2014
- David Moon, Maryland State Delegate, District 20
- Wes Moore, Governor of Maryland
- Cal Newport, author
- Katherine Paterson, author. Best known for children's novels, including Bridge to Terabithia
- Tom Perez, former chairman of the Democratic National Committee; former Secretary of Labor
- Al Petteway and Amy White, composers, musicians, singers
- Jamie Raskin, Congressman, 8th District
- Sarah Bloom Raskin, former Deputy Secretary of the Treasury; former governor of the Federal Reserve System
- Hans Riemer, former Montgomery County Councilmember
- Root Boy Slim, musician
- Nina Gilden Seavey, Emmy Award-winning documentary filmmaker
- Henry Vestine, guitarist
- Nick Zedd, underground filmmaker

== In popular culture ==
- Takoma Park is identified as a location in the video game Fallout 3.
- Takoma Park is cited in the production of the play, Native Gardens, by Karen Zacarias at Arena Stage in Washington, D.C. from September 15 – October 22, 2017.
- The movie American Milkshake was set and filmed in Takoma Park.
- "Takoma Park" is a song on the album Texas by Iain Campbell Smith (a.k.a. Fred Smith), described as "a comic portrait of a soft left suburb on the outskirts of Washington DC, with Glockenspiel solo."
- "The Ballad of Sammie Abbott" is a song in praise of Takoma Park's former mayor (1980–85) on the album Food for the Long Haul by Jesse Palidofsky from Azalea City Recording.
- Takoma Park is the location for the HQ of the protagonists in The Lone Gunmen, a television spinoff of the X-Files.
- Takoma Park is featured in Atlas Obscura articles on "Herlong the Carved Dragon" and "Roscoe the Rooster." Roscoe the Rooster is the subject of a poem, "Roscoe Magnus", authored by "Anonymous, 2nd century BCE, Trans. from Latin by Merrill Leffler." Merrill Leffler is Takoma Park's Poet Laureate Emeritus.
- Bridge to Terabithia, a children's novel by Katherine Paterson, winner of the Newbery Medal, was inspired by an event in Takoma Park.
- Takoma Park is the setting for a number of the novels of Allison Leotta.
- Takoma Park is referred to in The Night Gardener by George Pelecanos.
- Takoma Park is a location cited in the NBC television series, The Blacklist, Season 1, Episode 7 and Season 2, Episode 13.
- Takoma Park is described in the 2017 memoir by Suzanne Rhodenbaugh, The Deepest South I've Gotten.

== See also ==
- Takoma, Washington, D.C.
- Benjamin Franklin Gilbert
- Category:People from Washington, D.C.
- List of cities in Maryland
