= Benjamin Franklin Gilbert =

American real estate developer (1841–1907)

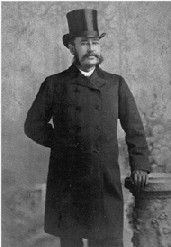
- Portrait of B. F. Gilbert
- Born: 1841
- Died: 1907 (aged 65–66)
- Other name: B. F. Gilbert
- Occupation: Real Estate Developer
- Known for: Founder of Takoma Park, Maryland

Benjamin Franklin Gilbert (1841–1907), an American real estate developer, was the founder of Takoma Park, Maryland, a suburb of Washington, D.C., and the city's first mayor. Gilbert was born in De Ruyter, Madison County, New York.

== Life ==
Gilbert served in the New York State Assembly during the Civil War. Gilbert later arrived in Washington, D.C., at the end of the Civil War and found work at the National Hotel as a clerk. He later opened a luncheon establishment named The Temperance located between 9th and 10th Streets in the Northwest quadrant of the city. During that time he became an associate of Alexander "Boss" Shepherd. Financial losses during the Panic of 1873 resulted in a move to Dunellen, New Jersey and the accumulation of a fortune in real estate.

After returning to Washington he began to acquire land for Takoma Park. His first purchase was in the spring of 1884 when he bought the 100-acre (0.40 km^{2}) Grammar farm. Gilbert purchased most of its land himself, about 1,000 acres (4.0 km^{2}) around the B&O Railroad tracks. He named the area Takoma, using the Indian word for exalted place. He was elected mayor upon the city's incorporation in 1890. He dreamed of creating "a fashionable suburb for Washington bureaucrats and a sylvan resort community where Washington's wealthiest families could escape the unhealthy summer air in the capital." Selling lots for five cents a square foot, Gilbert emphasized the beauty and peacefulness of the local environment, and was especially proud of the pure waters of the local Sligo Creek, which he thought would bring health benefits to residents. Losses due to the Depression of 1893 led to a change in Gilbert's financial standing. He declined to seek reelection as mayor in 1894.

His daughter, Margaret Gilbert Jamison, wrote of him:

Although he made a great deal of money in early and middle life, he was essentially an idealist rather than a cold, calculating money grabber. He devoted a great deal more of his time and energy to persuading people with children to buy a lot and build a home in a pleasant place like Takoma Park than he did in trying to persuade wealthier people to invest their money in his subdivisions.

He suffered from a stroke in 1901 and spent the rest of his life gravely ill. He died in 1907.

== See also ==
- Takoma Park, Maryland
- Takoma Park Historical District
- Takoma, DC
