= Takoma Park Historic District (Takoma Park, Maryland) =

Historic district in Maryland, United States

- U.S. National Register of Historic Places
- U.S. Historic district
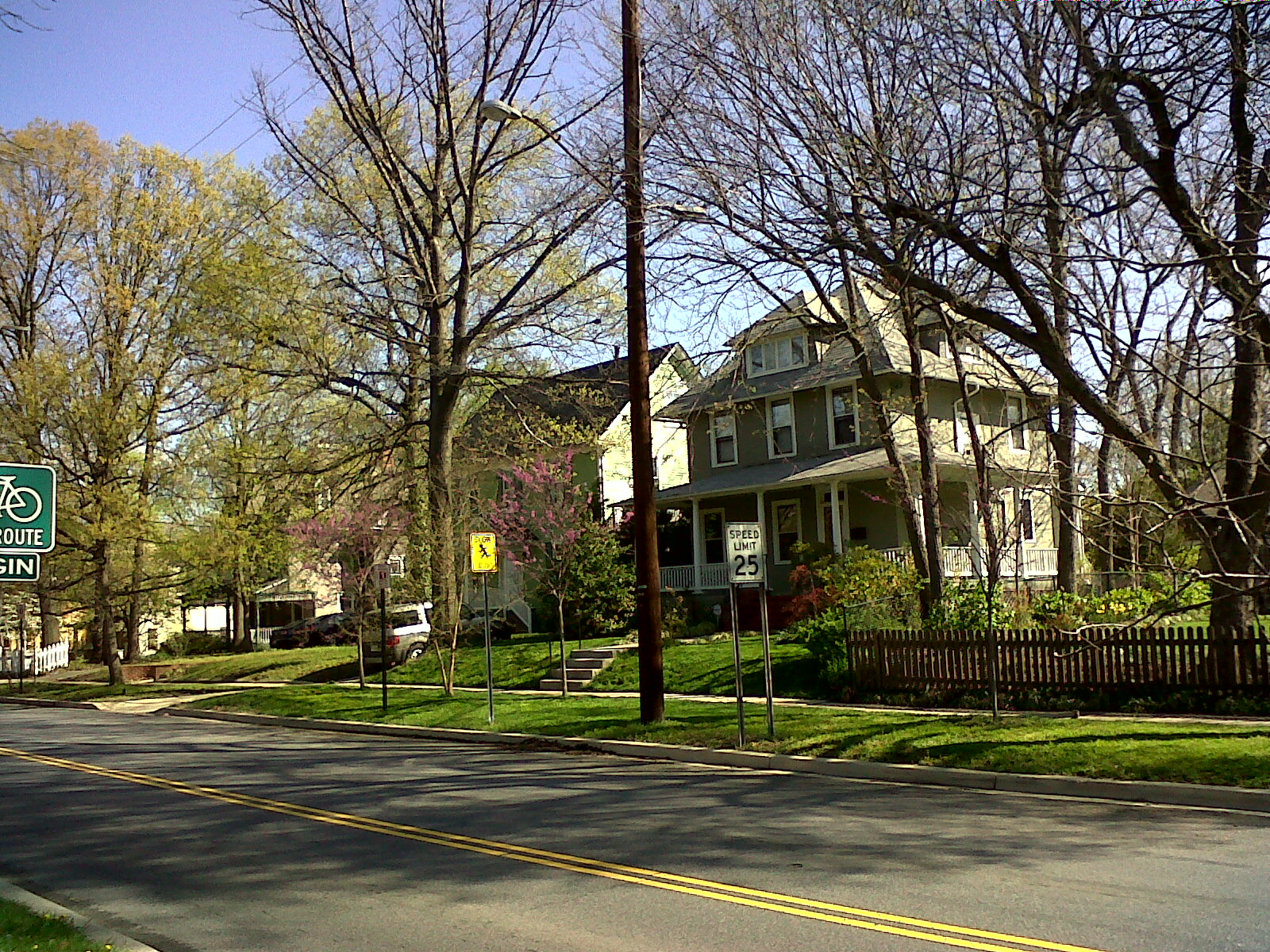
- Houses along Takoma Avenue

- Location within Maryland Location within the United States
- Location: Roughly bounded by D.C., Silver Spring, and E to jct. of Woodland and Elm Aves., Takoma Park, Maryland
- Coordinates: 38°58′41″N 77°0′46″W
- Area: 145 acres (59 ha)
- Built: 1880
- Architectural style: Late 19th And Early 20th Century American Movements, Queen Anne, Georgian Revival
- NRHP reference No.: 76001008
- Added to NRHP: July 16, 1976

The Takoma Park Historic District is a national historic district in Takoma Park, Montgomery County, Maryland. The district area was platted in 1883 by developer Benjamin Franklin Gilbert, and promoted for its natural environment and healthy setting. An early railroad suburb, the opening of streetcar lines led to the expansion of the district in the early 20th century. Takoma Park houses built between 1883 and 1900 are fanciful, turreted, multi-gabled affairs of Queen Anne architecture with Stick Style and Shingle Style influence. Buildings developed after the turn of the 20th century tend to be one- and two-story brick structures with simple ornamentation, although a few display characteristics of such styles as Art Deco and Tudor Revival.

It was listed on the National Register of Historic Places in 1976.
