= Sammie Abbott =

American politician (1908-1990)

Mayor of Takoma Park
- In office 1980–1985
- Preceded by: John D. Roth
- Succeeded by: Stephen J. Del Giudice

Personal details
- Born: Sammie Abdullah Abbott; April 25, 1908 Ithaca, New York
- Died: December 15, 1990 (aged 82) Takoma Park, Maryland
- Spouse: Ruth Abbott
- Children: Nancy Abbott Young, Abraham George Abbot, Susan Abbott Arisman
- Education: Cornell University
- Occupation: Graphic Designer, Activist and Politician

Sammie Abdullah Abbott (April 25, 1908 - December 15, 1990) was an American politician who served as the 18th mayor of Takoma Park, Maryland, from 1980 to 1985.

== Early life ==
Abbott was born in Ithaca, New York, to Syrian Christian refugees fleeing Turkish persecution in Syria. He enrolled in Cornell University to study architecture but dropped out a few credits short of his degree to organize farmers and the unemployed in Buffalo, New York, and Niagara, New York, during the Great Depression. In 1938, he met his wife, Ruth, in a Buffalo jail when she came to visit her father, a bricklayer and union activist, who had been arrested with Abbott. Together, they moved to Washington, D.C., in 1940, and Abbott and his father-in-law built a house in Takoma Park.

When the United States entered World War II, Abbott enlisted in the Army Air Corps, serving in the European Theater and earning a Bronze Star.

== Post-war activism ==
In the 1950s he actively campaigned for the adoption of the Bertrand Russell peace petition. He described himself as a Marxist, and in 1954, he was accused of being a member of the Communist party and called to testify before the House Un-American Activities Committee. After his testimony, he was fired from his job as a commercial artist, turning to freelance work.

In the 1960s and 1970s, Abbott was one of the leaders of the Emergency Committee on the Transportation Crisis (ECTC), organizing the opposition to the construction of the North Central Freeway through Northeast Washington and Takoma Park, using the slogan, "No white men's roads through black men's homes." He was also part of a group of local residents who organized against construction projects threatening Takoma Park. In 1978, Abbott helped to organize the first Takoma Park Folk Festival to raise money to save the Takoma Theater.

== Mayor of Takoma Park ==
Abbott ran for mayor of Takoma Park in 1978, but lost by just 8 votes. He won the office in 1980, and was re-elected in 1982 and 1984. As mayor, he oversaw the institution of rent control, installed speed bumps and four-way stops to slow traffic, and he successfully blocked the closing of public schools in Takoma Park. During his tenure, Takoma Park declared itself a Nuclear-free zone and a sanctuary for Salvadoran and Guatemalan refugees. Abbott declared Takoma Park "Tree City, USA," and the city, which had been known as "Tacky Park," acquired the nickname of the "People's Republic of Takoma."

In his bid for a fourth term in 1985, Abbott lost by just seven votes.

== Death and legacy ==
Abbott died of myelodysplasia anemia on December 15, 1990, at his Takoma Park home. The Takoma Park City Council passed a resolution lowering the city flag to half-mast, and the Montgomery County Council declared January 5, 1991, Sammie Abbott Day. Hundreds attended a memorial service that was held at the Washington Ethical Society.

In 1991, Takoma Park added the name "Sam Abbott Citizens' Center" to its municipal building. In 2002, Abbott was inducted into the Montgomery County Human Rights Hall of Fame. In 2015, a plaque was dedicated for Abbott in the Citizens' Center. The plaque recognizes Abbott's contributions to Takoma Park and concludes with a quote from him: "If we can't make it happen in Takoma Park, there's no hope for the nation."

Abbott's wife, Ruth, died in 2009, and they are survived by their children Nancy Abbott Young, Susan Abbott, and Abraham Abbott.
