= List of parks in Takoma Park =

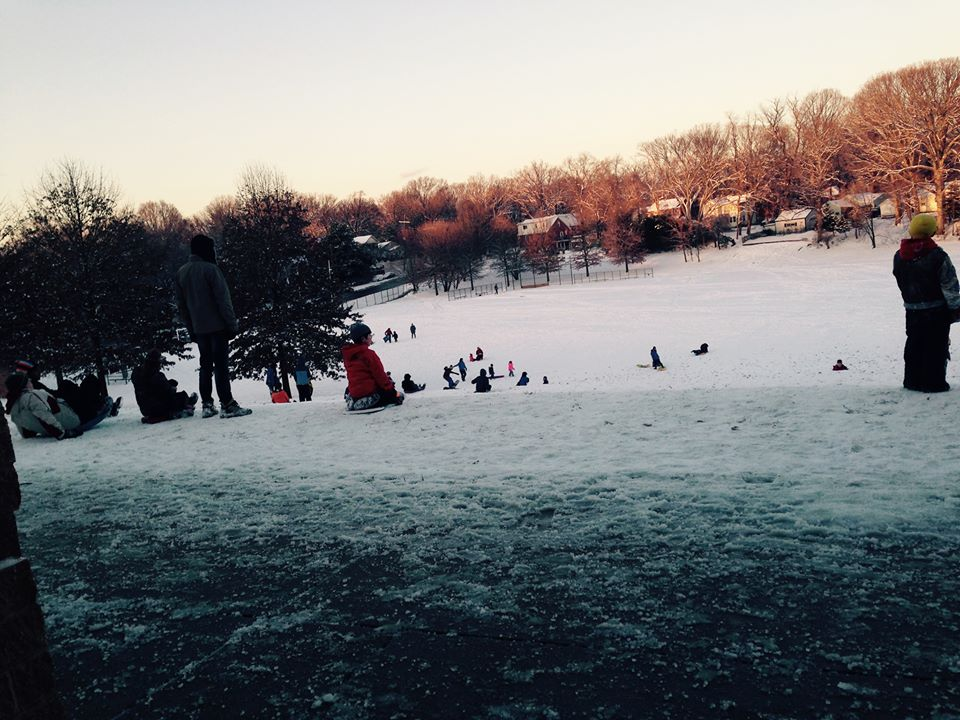
Lee Jordan Field in the snow

This is a list of parks in the city of Takoma Park, Maryland.

== County parks ==
Park name	Address or location	Ward
Becca Lilly Neighborhood Playground^{[a]}^{[b]}	Merwood Drive or Central Avenue at Longbranch Creek, Takoma Park, MD 20912	6
Hillwood Manor Park^{[a]}^{[b]}	13th Avenue and Elson Street, Takoma Park, MD 20912	6
Hodges Field^{[a]}^{[b]}	behind Takoma Elementary School, Takoma Park, MD 20912	1
Opal Daniels Park^{[a]}^{[b]}	Hancock and Sheridan Avenues, Takoma Park, MD 20912	3
Sligo Creek North Neighborhood Playground^{[a]}^{[b]}	Sligo Creek Parkway near Heather Avenue, Takoma Park, MD 20912	2
Stream Valley Parks^{[a]}^{[a]}	along Longbranch and Sligo Creeks, Takoma Park, MD 20912	2
Takoma Old Town Urban Park^{[a]}^{[b]}	Westmoreland and Carroll Avenues, Takoma Park, MD 20912	3
Takoma/Piney Branch Park (aka Takoma Woods)^{[a]}^{[b]}	2 Darwin Avenue, Takoma Park, MD 20912	1
Waldo's Wilds	6500 Allegheny Avenue, Takoma Park, MD 20912	3

== Gardens ==
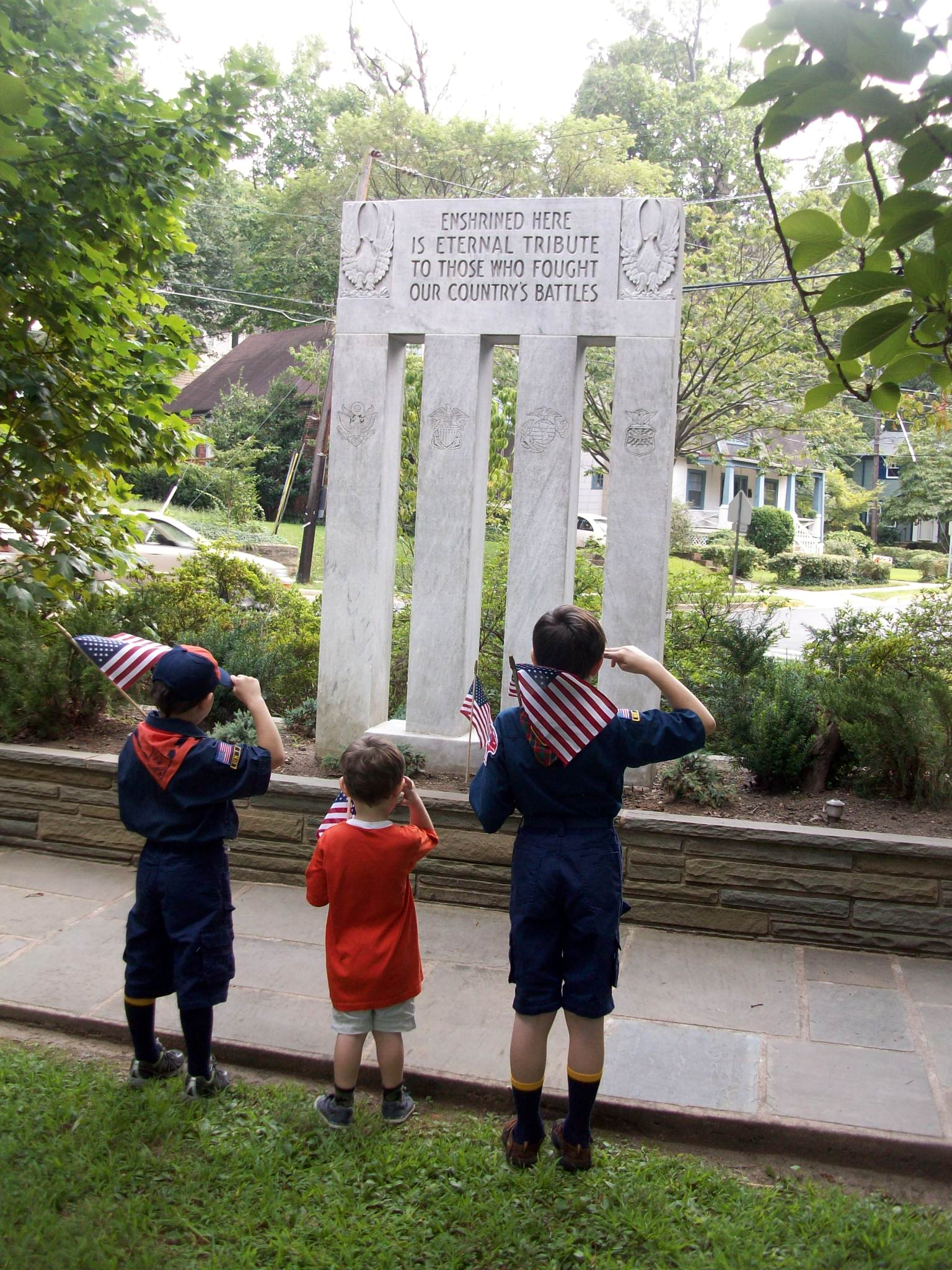
Memorial Day in Takoma Park

Park name	Address or location	Ward
Stuart M. Armstrong Garden^{[a]}	Holly and Philadelphia Avenues, Takoma Park, MD 20912	1
Lower Portal^{[a]}	Piney Branch and Philadelphia Avenues, Takoma Park, MD 20912	1
Republican Voters Garden / Democratic Voters Garden^{[a]}	Maple and Philadelphia Avenues, Takoma Park, MD 20912	3
Upper Portal (Casey Garden)^{[a]}	Piney Branch and Eastern Avenues, Takoma Park, MD 20912	1
Esther Geib Garden (Lions Club Garden)^{[a]} part of the Lower Portal garden	Piney Branch and Philadelphia Avenues, Takoma Park, MD 20912	1
Thomas Siegler Gardens^{[a]}	Tulip Avenue near Cedar, Takoma Park, MD 20912	3
Memorial Park^{[a]}	Maple and Philadelphia Avenues, Takoma Park, MD 20912	1

== Municipal parks ==
Municipal parks come under the administration of the City of Takoma Park, Department of Recreation.

Park name	Address or location	Ward
Belle Ziegler Park^{[c]}	7350 Takoma Ave, Takoma Park, MD 20912	1
Colby Avenue Park^{[c]}	Cherry & Colby Ave, Takoma Park, MD 20912	2
Forest Park^{[c]}	598 Elm Ave, Takoma Park, MD 20912	2
Heffner Park^{[c]}	42 Oswego Ave, Takoma Park, MD 20912	4
Jackson-Boyd Park^{[c]}	7398 Jackson Ave, Takoma Park, MD 20912	2
Spring Park Park^{[c]}	6999 Poplar Ave, Takoma Park, MD 20912	3
Toatley-Fraser Park^{[c]}	8300 Eastridge Ave, Takoma Park, MD 20912	5

== Other parks ==
Municipal parks come under the administration of the City of Takoma Park, Department of Recreation.

Park name	Address or location	Ward
B.Y. Morrison Park^{[a]}	Carroll and Ethan Allen Avenues, Takoma Park, MD 20912	3
Dorothy's Woods^{[c]}	Woodland & Cirlce Avenues, Takoma Park, MD 20912	2
Ed Wilhelm Field^{[a]}	2 Darwin Avenue, Takoma Park, MD 20912	4
Lee Jordan Field^{[a]}	7611 Piney Branch Rd, Takoma Park, MD 20912	4
Takoma Park Dog Park^{[a]}	2 Darwin Avenue, Takoma Park, MD 20912	4

== See also ==
- Sligo Creek
