= Cady-Lee =

Historic house in Washington, D.C., United States

- Lucinda Cady House
- U.S. National Register of Historic Places
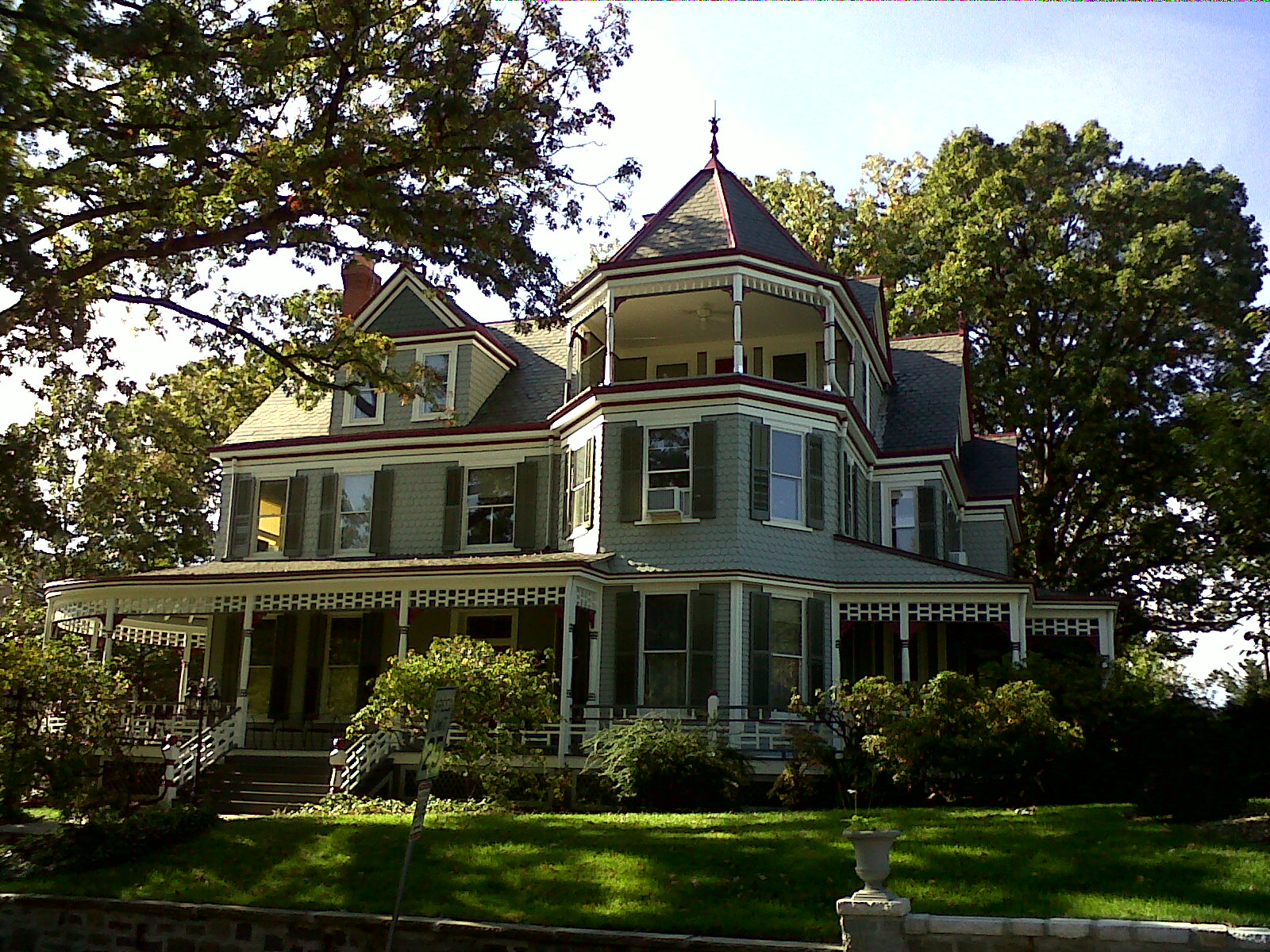

- Location within the District of Columbia
- Location: 7064 Eastern Ave., NW. Washington, D.C.
- Coordinates: 38°58′40″N 77°1′7″W
- Built: 1887
- Architect: Leon E. Dessez
- Architectural style: Shingle Style
- NRHP reference No.: 75002047
- Added to NRHP: May 28, 1975

Cady-Lee is an historic house located in the Takoma neighborhood in Washington, D.C. It has been listed on the National Register of Historic Places since 1975 as the Lucinda Cady House. The house is named for Lucinda Cady and her daughter Mary Lee who both owned the house.

== History ==
Henry and Lucinda Cady moved to Takoma Park from Ashland, Virginia in 1886. Henry Cady was a real estate and insurance salesman. He sold properties largely in Takoma Park and South Brookland from his office at 520-10th Street, N.W. in Washington. At the time the area had 16 homes and about 100 people. They hired Washington architect Leon E. Dessez to design their new home. He had previously worked on the Washington Monument and designed the Admiral's House, now known as Number One Observatory Circle, the official residence of the Vice President of the United States. Frederick Dudley built the house, which was completed in 1887. Other large homes joined the Cady's along what was known as Magnolia Street, now Eastern Avenue.

The Cadys moved into their new home with their five children. They hosted services of the Episcopal Church in their home. Together with other Episcopalians in the area they organized Takoma Parish, now Trinity Episcopal Church. They held a concert at their home to help raise the funds for the new church, which was completed in 1893. Lucinda headed the Ladies Guild at the church for 16 years.

Henry Cady died in 1906 and Lucinda remained in the house until her death in 1934. Her daughter Mary, who was a school teacher, inherited the home and she and her husband B.K. Lee had electricity and indoor plumbing installed. The house became known as Cady-Lee at the time. Mary had little money in later years to update the house and created an apartment for herself on the main floor of the house after her husband's death. She invited relatives to move into the rooms on the upper floors.

Mary Lee died in 1973. By this time the other large homes along Eastern Avenue were torn down and replaced by garden apartments. The Cady-Lee was also targeted for demolition. Members of the community rallied to save the home and it was placed on the National Register of Historic Places on May 28, 1975. It was the beginning of creating the Takoma Park Historic District in both Maryland and the District of Columbia, which was added to the National Register in 1983. Gerald and Sandra Kurtinitis bought the house in 1975. They started to renovate the Cady-Lee room by room and restored the house to its historic grandeur. Later, they sold the house in 2000 to Frances Phipps who was able to make more recent improvements. She did not intend to live in the house herself and looked for a non-profit agency to take it over. The Forum for Youth Investment bought the house in 2002 and now uses it for their offices. The upper floors and lower-level house the Forum staff and equipment. The first floor provides meeting space for Forum events and other non-profits. The Forum for Youth Investment sold the house in April 2025 to Takoma Park Properties LLC for $1,950,000. The new owner announced plans for a child care center, but by 2026, plans were still uncertain and no action had been taken publicly.

== Architecture ==
The Cady-Lee was designed in the Shingle Style that was popular on the east coast of the United States in the 1880s. The three-story structure is asymmetrical in design and is built over a basement. It contains 22 rooms, has 50 windows, 11-foot ceilings on the first floor and 9 foot on the second floor, seven gables, and a turreted sleeping porch. The main façade is dominated by a tower-like bay on the northeast corner. On the second story, the dormer and the gable ends are covered in scalloped shaped shingles. They extend down the house to form the porch and veranda roofs. The roofline is varied and reflects the Shingle Style. It consists of gables and cross gables that are topped by finials and two brick chimneys with corbelled chimney caps.

The interior features carved oak moldings and a two-story oak staircase where a Tiffany-style stained glass window is located. It also houses five of the original seven fireplace mantels. The foyer on the first floor leads to a library with carved bookcases and a front parlor with an original cheery wood mantel and over-mantel. The dining room has a Chinese Chippendale style mantel. It also contains a 1889 Bundy Hot Closet Dining Room Radiator that the Smithsonian Institution says is one of the few left of its kind. A kitchen, with a cast-iron wood-burning stove, and a morning room, with a hand painted mural of an English garden, are in the back of the first floor. The second floor contains five large rooms, of which one has a working fireplace, and a bath. The third floor contains six rooms, a kitchen and a bath.
