= 2 Amys =

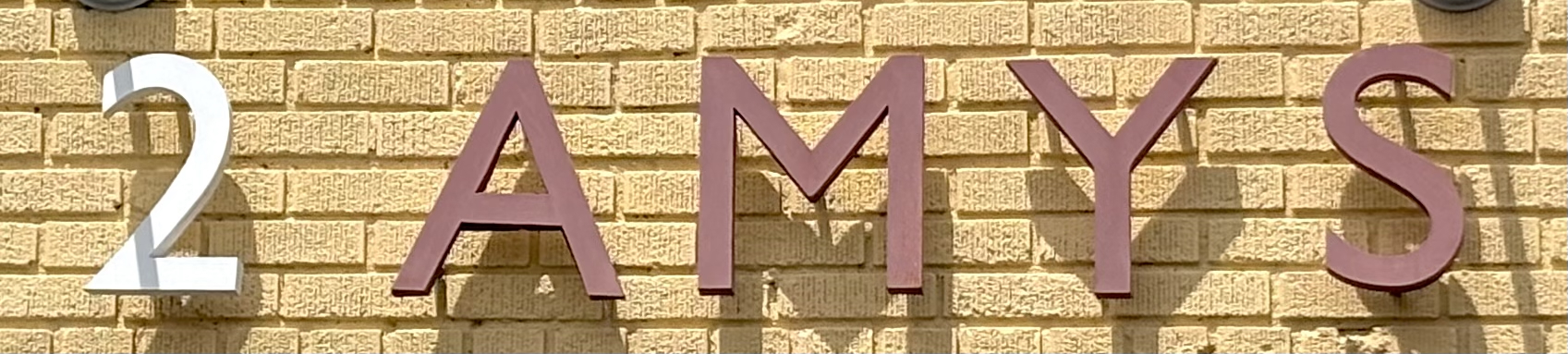

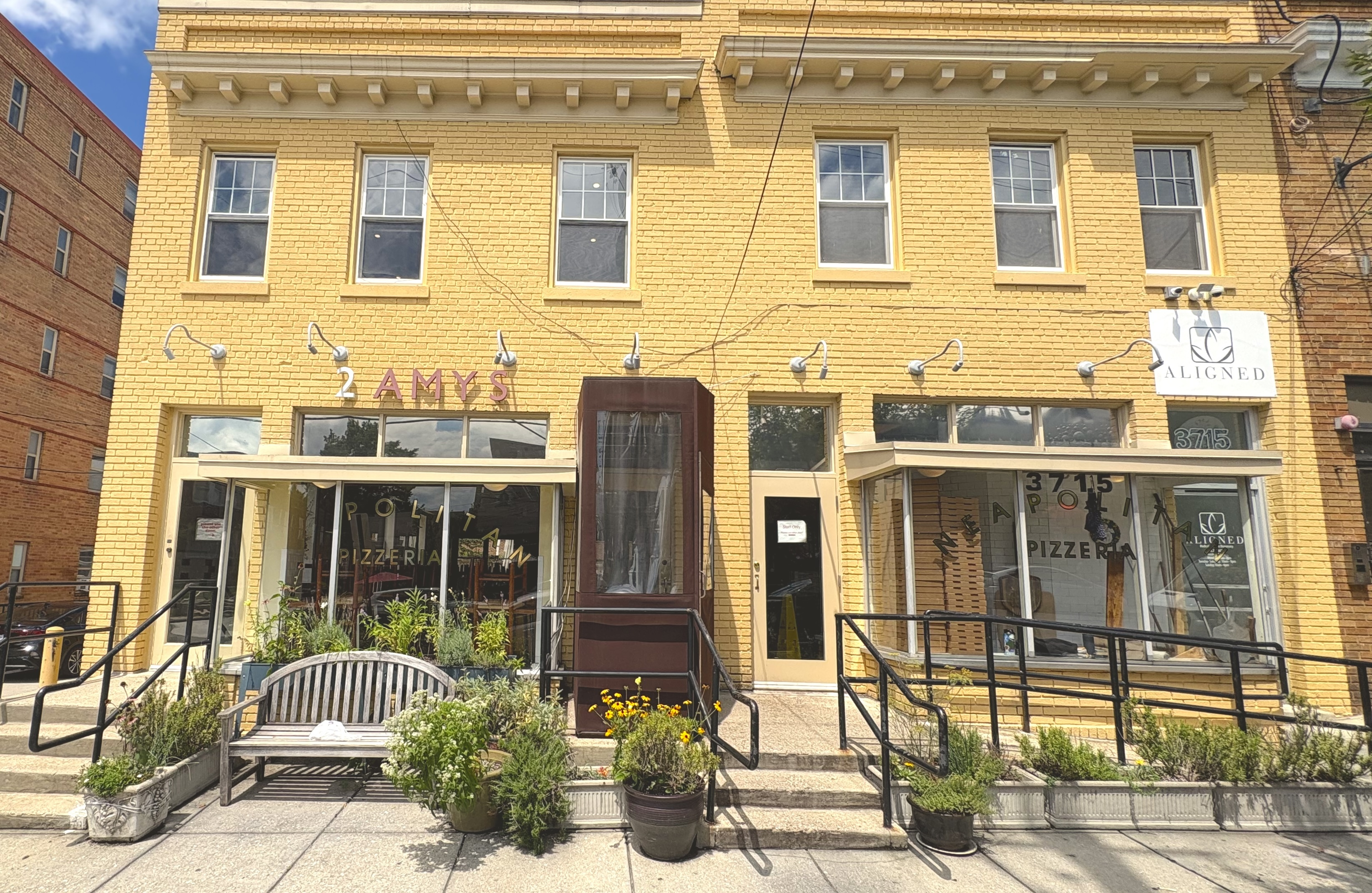
- The restaurant's exterior in 2026
- Interactive map of 2 Amys

Restaurant information
- Established: September 2001
- Owners: Peter Pastan; Amy Morgan
- Head chef: Peter Pastan
- Food type: Italian
- Location: 3715 Macomb St NW, Washington D.C., 20016, United States
- Coordinates: 38°56′01″N 77°04′23″W
- Reservations: No
- Website: 2amyspizza.com

2 Amys is a restaurant in the Cathedral Heights neighborhood of Washington, D.C., United States. The restaurant serves assorted Italian cuisine and specializes in Neapolitan pizza. It was opened in September 2001 by chef and restauranteers Peter Pastan and Tim Giamette.

== History ==
2 Amys opened in September 2001 as a joint venture between chef-restauranteurs Peter Pastan, of the Dupont Circle neighborhood restaurant Obelisk, and Tim Giamette, who had previously worked as a catering chef. The two named the restaurant after their wives—both of whom were named Amy. Tim left the business in 2006, but his wife Amy Morgan remained a partner in the venture.

In 2013, Morgan and Pastan partnered with former 2 Amys employee Tad Curtz and his business partner David Rosner to open a new Italian bistro Etto in Logan Circle. Although both 2 Amys and Etto borrow dishes from one another, Pastan has stated that the pizza uses a different dough and method of preparation.

In the summer of 2018, a water leak forced 2 Amys to close for multiple months of repairs. The restaurant's temporary closure was likely what led to its removal from the Michelin Guide's Bib Gourmand list in 2019.

Amidst the challenges of the COVID-19 Pandemic, 2 Amys offered carry-out service. During this time, the restaurant also adopted a gratuity-free model wherein the cost of service was included in the price of the bill. After the restaurant reopened to indoor seating, the gratuity-free model remained and continues today.

In 2024, Pastan partnered with his son, Oliver Pastan, to open the Mount Pleasant neighborhood Italian bistro Bar del Monte. The restaurant quickly garnered acclaim including being named on one Bon Appétit's twenty best new restaurants of 2024.

== Cuisine ==
2 Amys serves a rotating menu of pizzas and assorted Italian dishes. When it opened in 2001, the restaurant specialized in Neapolitan pizza, a form of pizza defined by its small size, soft elastic crust, and high edges. Conforming to the strict standards of the Associazione Verace Pizza Napoletana (lit. 'True Neapolitan Pizza Association'), the restaurant's pizza dough was awarded the distinction of Denominazione di Origine Controllata (DOC).

== Accolades ==
2 Amys has received mostly positive reviews from critics since it opened in 2021.

In 2016, 2 Amys was included on the Michelin Guide's Bib Gourmand list, although the restaurant was subsequently removed from the list in 2019.
