= Daniela Moreira =

Argentine-American chef and restaurateur

- Moreira in 2016
- Born: 1989 or 1990 (age 36–37); Argentina
- Education: The Culinary Institute of America
- Years active: 2014–present
- Spouse: Andrew Dana (m. 2022)
- Culinary career
- Current restaurants
- Timber Pizza; Call Your Mother

Daniela Moreira is an Argentine-American chef and restaurateur. Trained as a fine dining chef, in 2015 she joined a mobile pizzeria business called Timber Pizza and helped it establish its first brick-and-mortar location in Washington, D.C., as executive chef. In 2018, she developed a bagel recipe and co-founded the Call Your Mother delicatessen chain alongside her business partner and future husband Andrew Dana. She has been recognized by Eater for her work as a chef and restaurateur, and both Timber and Call Your Mother have become popular restaurant chains and received critical praise.

== Early life and education ==
Moreira was born and raised in Argentina. She grew up in Alta Gracia, where her parents ran a summer camp and restaurant. She began making pizzas during a summer job in her teenage years. Moreira attended culinary school in Córdoba until moving to Washington, D.C., at age 20 to work as an au pair. In Washington, she studied in the culinary program for immigrant adult learners at Carlos Rosario International Public Charter School, then studied at the Culinary Institute of America in Hyde Park, New York. After graduating, Moreira worked at Eleven Madison Park.

== Timber Pizza ==
Moreira meets with a supplier at Timber's Petworth location.

After a brief stint back in Argentina, she returned to Washington, where she met Andrew Dana and his business partner Chris Brady, who were running Timber Pizza by baking pies from an oven trailer at farmers' markets. She worked for Dana and Brady part-time while waiting to line up another fine dining job, but after a few months decided to remain at Timber.

Moreira became a co-owner and executive chef at Timber and helped to open Timber's first brick-and-mortar location in Washington's Petworth neighborhood in 2016. The small restaurant served what its owners called "Neopolitan-ish" pizza, along with items like empanadas due to Moreira's influence. The small restaurant, with a single large wood-fired oven, became a popular spot in Petworth. With her culinary training, Moreira professionalized Timber's operation. In 2017, Moreira was named to Eater's list of the best new chefs and restaurateurs. That year, Timber was named to Bon Appétit magazine's list of the 50 best new restaurants.

== Call Your Mother ==
Moreira had never eaten a bagel before deciding to open Call Your Mother. To develop her bagel recipe, she sampled bagels from around North America and spent nine months developing the recipe in Timber's D.C. kitchen. Eater describes the bagel that emerged as having a "hint of honey" and occupying "a happy medium between fluffy, savory New York bagels and dense, sweet Montreal bagels." Call Your Mother's first location opened in the Park View neighborhood in October 2018. It quickly became popular, with lines down the block. It was named to Eater's list of best new restaurants in 2019.

During the disruption of the COVID-19 pandemic, Call Your Mother avoided layoffs of staff and grew 120% in the first nine months of 2021. The restaurant received major media coverage after President Joe Biden visited its Georgetown location in January 2021. Amid a wave of protests after the murder of George Floyd in 2020, Call Your Mother received criticism on Instagram for alleged cultural appropriation. Moreira and Dana issued an apology, and the company removed photos of rapper Drake and renamed bagel sandwiches that had been tributes to Rihanna and Amar'e Stoudemire. "We now understand that these choices were co-opting Black culture and profiting off it, without truly paying homage," Dana and Moreira said. "As our company's leaders, we have not done enough to show what we have always known to be true: that Black Lives Matter. We stand with Black people, Black Washingtonians, and our Black neighbors in Park View."

In 2020, Moreira and Dana opened a full-service, South American-inspired restaurant in D.C.'s West End neighborhood called Mercy Me. The restaurant is located in the Yours Truly DC hotel.

== Personal life ==
Moreira was briefly married in 2016. She and Andrew Dana became engaged in 2019 and married in January 2022. As of 2019, they lived in Petworth.
