= Aurelius Battaglia =

American visual artist (1910–1984)

- Born: 16 January 1910; Washington, D.C., United States
- Died: May 29, 1984 (aged 74); Provincetown, Massachusetts, United States
- Education: Corcoran School of the Arts and Design
- Known for: Illustrator

Aurelius Battaglia (January 16, 1910 – May 29, 1984) was an American illustrator, muralist, writer, and director.

== Early life and education ==
Battaglia was born on January 16, 1910, in Washington, D.C.. He was the son of Giuseppe and Concetta Battaglia, who had emigrated from Cefalù in Sicily, Italy.

He attended the Corcoran School of the Arts and Design. He graduated, winning $50 in a Corcoran-sponsored art contest.

Battaglia married fellow student Edith Richmond after they graduated in 1932, from Corcoran School of Art. He later married Eleanor Mill (1929–2008), and they were together for 15 years before separating.

== Career ==
Battaglia and Edith Richmond bartered paintings for dental work and other necessities. He worked as a caricaturist for The Washington Star and Reporter. In 1934, the Public Works of Art Project commissioned Battaglia to paint murals in the children's section of the library in the Mount Pleasant neighborhood of Washington where he resided. The result is a whimsical panorama of anthropomorphic animals at play, still viewable on the second floor of the Mount Pleasant Library. He later worked for the Resettlement Administration, a New Deal federal agency that, between April 1935 and December 1936, relocated struggling urban and rural families to communities planned by the federal government.

=== Move to California and subsequent career ===
Battaglia migrated west in the late 1930s and worked for the Walt Disney Studios from 1937 to 1941. Battaglia started as an in-betweener and soon after moved to the story department. He worked on Dumbo, Fantasia, and Pinocchio and is credited as one of the writers of the latter. Battaglia participated in the Disney animators' strike. He was fired but later rehired. He also worked briefly for Warner Brothers and made training films for the United States Navy during World War II.

In the mid-1950s, Battaglia joined United Productions of America. There he directed the short film The Invisible Moustache of Raoul Dufy, which was nominated for a BAFTA Award, and worked on "The Beanstalk Trial"

Battaglia was a prolific children's book illustrator, favoring bold colors and stylized pen and brush work. Titles include "Cowboy Jack, the Sheriff," "The Fire Engine Book," "Little Boy With a Big Horn," "When I Met Robin," "Captain Kangaroo's Read-Aloud Book," and "The Fireside Book of American Folk Songs." He contributed to the Childcraft book series published by Field Enterprises.

Battaglia moved to Provincetown, Massachusetts, where he continued to work until his death on May 29, 1984.

== Illustrated books ==
- Pat-a-cake : a baby's Mother Goose, 1947
- The penny puppy and other dog stories, 1949
- Lost in the stars caricature, 1949 Oct.
- Touch and go caricature, October 9, 1949.
- Little boy with a big horn, 1950
- The cat who went to sea, and other cat stories, 1950
- Pets for Peter, 1950
- The fireside book of favorite American songs, 1952
- Cowboy Jack The Sheriff, 1953
- Our American language, 1960
- Captain Kangaroo's storybook, 1963
- Captain Kangaroo's sleepytime book, 1963
- This is my house, 1964
- Here comes spring, 1964
- The reindeer book, 1965
- Around the city, 1965
- Stories to read to the very young, 1966
- The little pig who listened, 1966
- When I met Robin., 1968
- The Raggedy Ann book, 1969
- Old Mother Hubbard, 1970
- The magic of music : book one, 1970
- Detective Arthur on the scent, 1971]
- The new golden dictionary., 1972
- Boys' and girls' dictionary, 1973
- 1974 Golden fragrance calendar, 1973
- Detective Arthur, master sleuth, 1974
- The big farm book, 1976
- Three little pigs, 1977
- Seasons, 1977
- A farm, 1978
- Animal homemakers, 1978
- Happy Jack and the princess, 1978
- My first Mother Goose book, 1980
- Animal sounds, 1981
- Mr. Bell's Fixit Shop, 1981
- Hiram's red shirt, 1981
- Pain d'épice, 1981
- The Santa Claus book, 1982
- The fire engine book, 1982
- Detective Arthur in the case of the mysterious stranger, 1982
- Detective Arthur : paint with water., 1982
- My big farm book : adapted from the original text, 1987
- The bunnies' book of seasons, 1987
- Mr. Bell's fixit shop, 1987
- Animal sounds, 1981
