= Andrew Dana =

American restaurateur

- Dana in 2016
- Born: 1990 or 1991 (age 35–36)
- Education: College of Charleston (BA); Gabelli School of Business (MBA)
- Occupation: Restaurateur
- Years active: 2014–present
- Known for: Timber Pizza, Call Your Mother
- Spouse: Daniela Moreira (m. 2022)

Andrew Dana is an American restaurateur. He is known for founding the pizza chain Timber Pizza and the bagel bakery and delicatessen chain Call Your Mother. Raised in Washington, D.C., during business school he developed a concept for a Neapolitan-style pizzeria. In 2014, along with business partner Chris Brady, Dana opened Timber in 2014 with a mobile pizza oven trailer. They opened their first brick-and-mortar location in 2016 with chef Daniela Moreira, who became a co-owner of the business and whom Dana married in 2022. Timber became popular and critically well received. In 2018, Dana and Moreira opened Call Your Mother, which also became a popular and critically praised restaurant and expanded to several locations.

== Early life and education ==
Dana grew up in Washington's Mount Pleasant neighborhood. His father was a divorce attorney. Dana is Jewish on his father's side.

He received a B.A. in political science from the College of Charleston in 2008. After graduating, Dana sold windows before returning to business school. While at the Gabelli School of Business in New York, he began exploring the possibility of opening a pizzeria, and developed a concept for his MBA capstone project that eventually became Timber Pizza. Returning to D.C., he initially worked for an educational software startup.

== Timber Pizza ==
Dana (right) preparing pizzas at a farmers' market

Dana and Chris Brady started Timber Pizza Company with a pizza oven trailer baking pies at D.C.-area farmers' markets. While making pizzas near the U.S. Department of Agriculture in 2015, Dana met Argentine chef Daniela Moreira and eventually hired her at Timber Pizza. With Moreira on board, Timber opened its first brick-and-mortar location in Washington's Petworth neighborhood in 2016. The small restaurant served what its owners called "Neopolitan-ish" pizza, along with items like empanadas. The small restaurant, with a single large wood-fired oven, became a popular spot in Petworth. In 2017, Timber was named to Bon Appétit magazine's list of the 50 best new restaurants.

== Call Your Mother ==
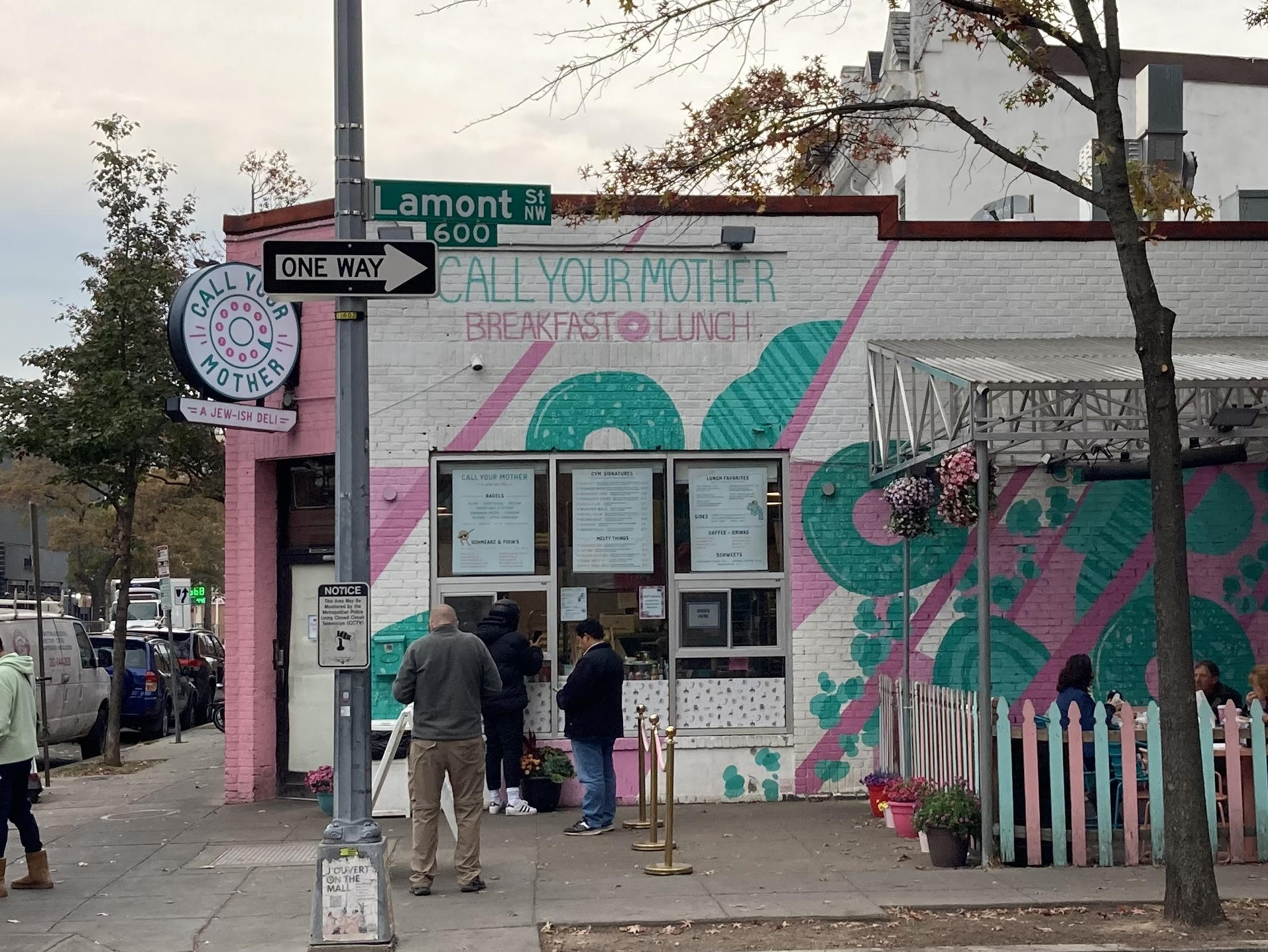
Call Your Mother's original location in Park View

In October 2018, Dana and Moreira opened a bagel bakery and delicatessen, inspired by Jewish delis, called Call Your Mother in the Park View neighborhood. Dana recruited Jeff Zients as an investor. It quickly became popular, with lines down the block. It was named to Eater's list of best new restaurants in 2019.

During the disruption of the COVID-19 pandemic, Call Your Mother avoided layoffs of staff and grew 120% in the first nine months of 2021. The restaurant received major media coverage after President Joe Biden visited its Georgetown location in January 2021. Amid a wave of protests after the murder of George Floyd in 2020, Call Your Mother received criticism on Instagram for alleged cultural appropriation. Moreira and Dana issued an apology, and the company removed photos of rapper Drake and renamed bagel sandwiches that had been tributes to Rihanna and Amar'e Stoudemire. "We now understand that these choices were co-opting Black culture and profiting off it, without truly paying homage," Dana and Moreira said. "As our company's leaders, we have not done enough to show what we have always known to be true: that Black Lives Matter. We stand with Black people, Black Washingtonians, and our Black neighbors in Park View."

In 2020, Dana and Moreira opened a full-service, South American-inspired restaurant in D.C.'s West End neighborhood called Mercy Me. The restaurant is located in the Yours Truly DC hotel.

== Personal life ==
Dana and Moreira became engaged in 2019 and were married in January 2022. As of 2019, they lived in Petworth. Dana is a yoga practitioner.
