= Francis Asbury Memorial =

Statue in Washington, D.C., U.S.

- Francis Asbury
- U.S. National Register of Historic Places
- D.C. Inventory of Historic Sites
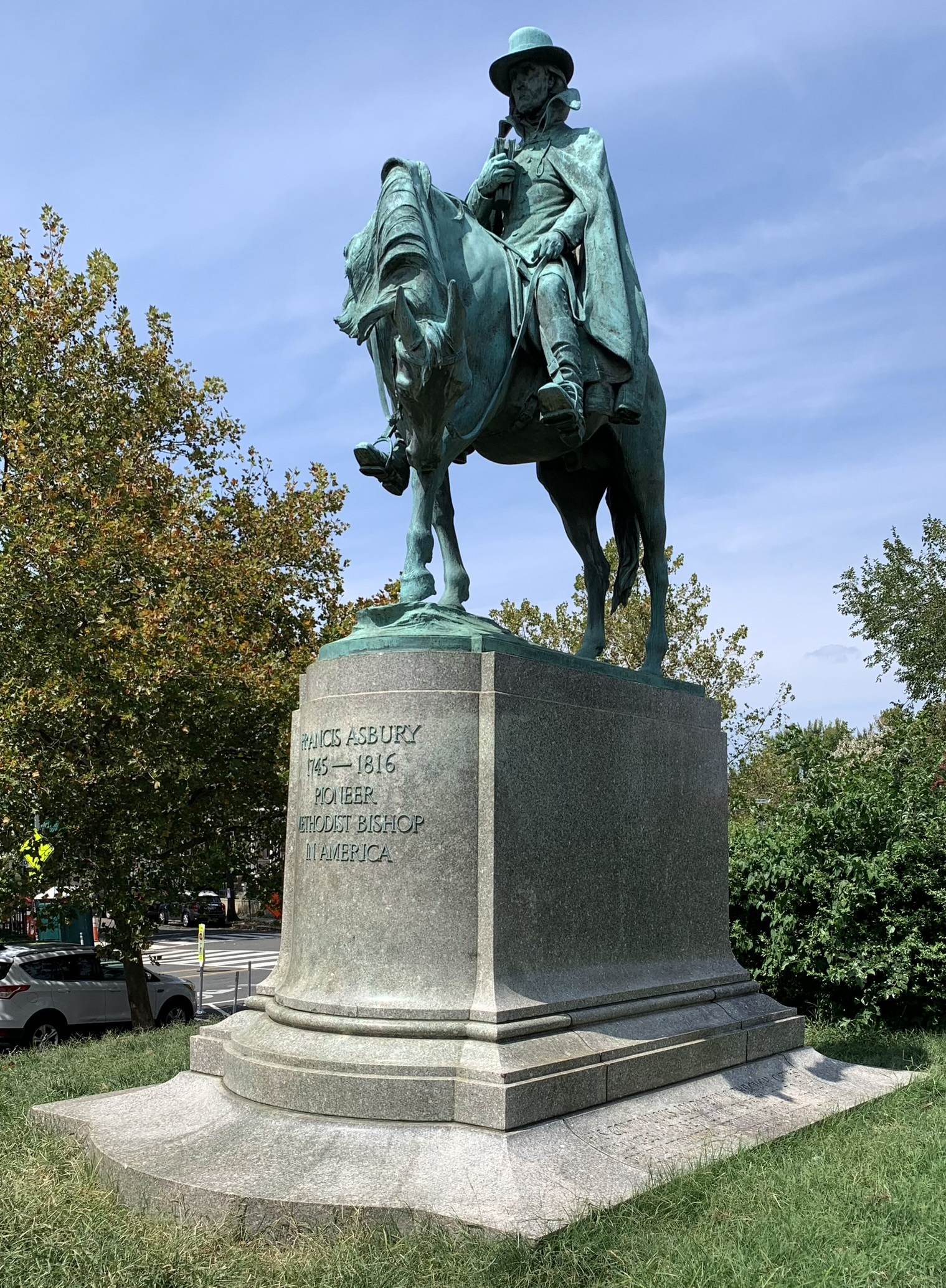
- Statue in 2023

- Location within Washington, D.C.
- Location: 3025 Mt. Pleasant St. NW, Washington, D.C.
- Coordinates: 38°55′39″N 77°2′12″W
- Built: 1924
- Architect: Henry Augustus Lukeman
- NRHP reference No.: 07001052

Significant dates
- Added to NRHP: October 11, 2007
- Designated DCIHS: February 22, 2007

Francis Asbury, also known as the Francis Asbury Memorial, is a public equestrian statue, by American artist Henry Augustus Lukeman, located at 16th Street and Mt. Pleasant Street, Northwest, Washington, D.C., in the Mount Pleasant neighborhood.

It was originally surveyed as part of the Smithsonian's Save Outdoor Sculpture! survey in 1994.

== Description ==
This bronze sculpture features Francis Asbury seated upon his horse wearing a cape and hat. In his proper right hand he holds a bible. The horse is bending its head down to lick its left leg. The sculpture sits on a granite base (approx. 100 in. x 140 in. x 200 in.). On the proper left side of the sculpture, near the base, it is signed "Augustus Lukeman Sc 1921."

The sculpture is inscribed on the front of the base:

FRANCIS ASBURY
1745-1816
PIONEER
METHODIST BISHOP
IN AMERICA

On the left side of the base it is inscribed:

HIS CONTINUOUS JOURNEY THROUGH CITIES
VILLAGES AND SETTLEMENTS FROM 1771 TO 1816
GREATLY PROMOTED PATRIOTISM EDUCATION MORALITY
AND RELIGION IN THE AMERICAN REPUBLIC
Act of Congress

On the right side of the base it is inscribed:

IF YOU SEEK FOR THE RESULTS OF HIS LABOR
YOU WILL FIND THEM
IN OUR CHRISTIAN CIVILIZATION

And on the back of the base it is inscribed:

THE PROPHET
OF THE LONG ROAD

== Design and dedication event ==
During the leap year of 1919, President Woodrow Wilson and the 66th Congress of the United States gave approval to the site and location for the Francis Asbury Statue. This formal event which occurred on February 29, 1919 allowed for the newly formed Francis Asbury Memorial Foundation to begin its work to raise monies for the Francis Asbury Statue.

For design of the statue, The Francis Asbury Memorial Foundation chose Mr. Evarts Tracy. The distinguished designer from the New York architectural firm, Tracy and Swartwout, was not only a talented architect and designer, he was the great-great grandson of Roger Sherman, a signer of the American Declaration of Independence. In addition to his design architectural design experience, Mr. Evarts Tracy was commissioned years earlier to design camouflage techniques for the troops on the front line of World War I. The design of the Francis Asbury Statue by Mr. Evarts Tracy began in the year 1919. Upon completion of the design, the Francis Asbury Memorial Foundation chose the Roman Bronze Works of New York to build the equestrian memorial. In 1921, the Roman Bronze Works in turn commissioned the independent artist, Henry Augustus Lukeman to sculpt the Asbury Statue.

On October 15, 1924 at 2:30 pm, a dedication ceremony for the Francis Asbury Statue took place with several thousand people in attendance, including dignitaries from Washington D.C.

In one of the photos taken of the ceremony, President Calvin Coolidge stands at the podium, ready to give his speech containing a famous phrase about Francis Asbury, “He is entitled to rank as one of the builders of our nation.”

Another photo from the day of the dedication displays the patriotic manner in which the statue was veiled before the ceremony. Two large American flags flank either side of the statue. “The shot taken from the crowd level is a stunning depiction of Francis Asbury and the flags of his adopted country. A country in which he spent nearly his entire life leading the people of the frontier to Jesus Christ.”

== Information ==
The sculpture was founded by Roman Bronze Works in New York City. The piece was erected by the Francis Asbury Memorial Foundation and was approved by Congress on February 29, 1919. It was dedicated on October 15, 1924 and cost $50,000.

== Condition ==
This sculpture was surveyed in 1994 for its condition and was described as "well maintained."

== Gallery ==
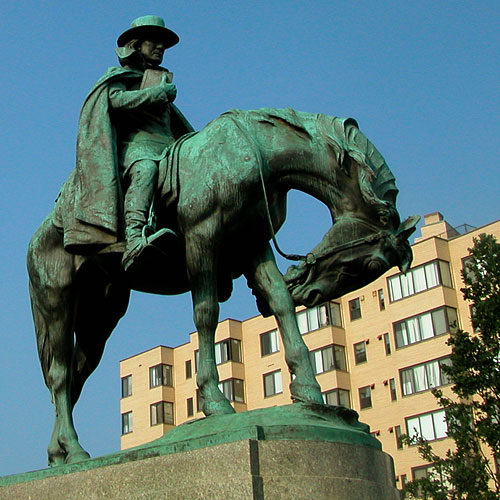
Proper right

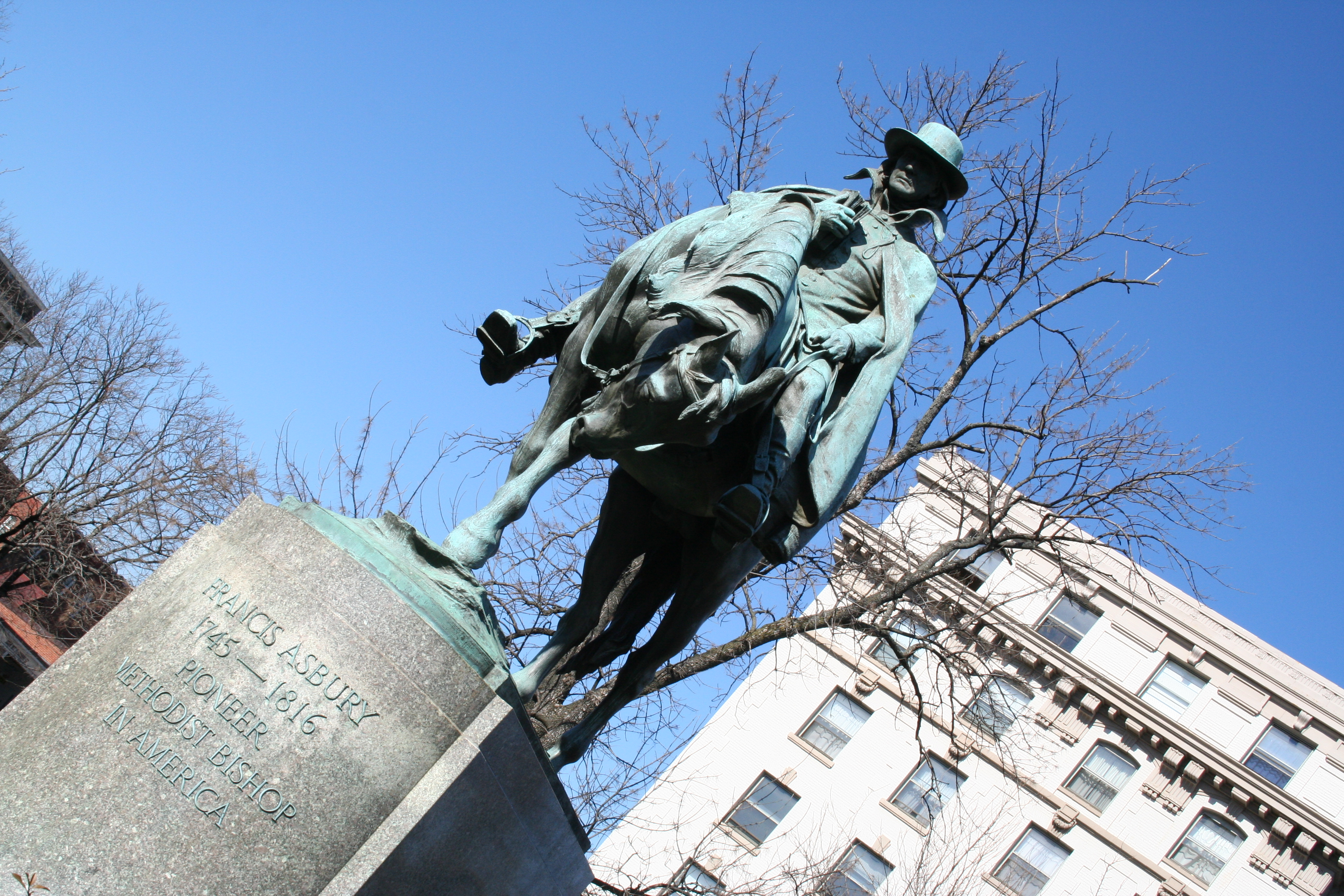
Front

== See also ==
- Equestrian statue
