= 1991 Washington, D.C., riot =

Protests against police killings

The 1991 Washington, D.C., riot, sometimes referred to as the Mount Pleasant riot or Mount Pleasant Disturbance, occurred in May 1991, when rioting broke out in the Mount Pleasant neighborhood of Washington, D.C., in response to an African-American female police officer having shot a Salvadoran man in the chest following a Cinco de Mayo celebration.

== Background ==
Mount Pleasant is a neighborhood in Ward 1 of Washington, D.C. Located north of Adams Morgan and west of Columbia Heights, the neighborhood was one of the most diverse in the nation, with a population of roughly equal proportions of black, Hispanic, and white residents, along with Vietnamese, Laotians, Indians, and South Korean ones.

=== Shooting incident ===
On Sunday evening, May 5, 1991, following a Cinco de Mayo street celebration in nearby Adams Morgan, Angela Jewell, a rookie Metropolitan Police Department police officer of African American descent tried to arrest a Salvadoran man, Daniel Enrique Gomez, for disorderly conduct in the Mount Pleasant neighborhood. Witnesses disputed whether the drunken man came at her with a hunting knife, but the result was that she shot and wounded the man in the chest.

== Riot ==
The man was shot and left paralyzed. While he was handcuffed, crowds of youths, most in their teens and twenties, formed and started to attack the police. Around 400 youths fought running street battles with the police for several hours, late into the night. Police cars were set on fire and several stores looted. The District's mayor, Sharon Pratt Dixon, told the police to hold back from making arrests for looting, allegedly because she feared it would antagonize the crowd and lead to more violence. The violence continued until early in the morning, when the crowds began to break up because of rain.

Hoping to avoid a second night of rioting, city officials met with Hispanic community leaders the next day, but the meeting did little to stop the violence. By evening, even with 1,000 riot police on the streets, the rioting started again. Police fought with as many as 600 black and Hispanic youths, some with bandanas over their faces. The rioters pushed dumpsters into the streets to block traffic, looted and damaged stores, and attacked police vehicles and city transit buses, setting several on fire. Several instances of gunfire were also reported. The police responded by firing tear gas grenades at the groups of rioting youths and by making arrests. When it was obvious that the disturbance was not going to end, the mayor declared a state of emergency and put a curfew into effect. The curfew covered a four-square-mile area of the city and included not only Mount Pleasant but also the surrounding areas of Adams Morgan and Columbia Heights.

By Tuesday night, after two nights of rioting, the curfew reduced the disorder; only isolated incidents of violence and 33 arrests were reported on the third night of rioting. Hundreds of police officers descended onto the neighborhood to enforce the 7:00 pm curfew and curb violence. Although there were some reports of rock and bottle throwing, no further stores were looted or fires set. Most people in the area stayed in their homes, afraid of being arrested for breaking the curfew. The riot was essentially over.

== Aftermath ==
By the time the curfew was finally lifted on May 9, almost 230 people had been arrested, most of them for curfew violations. Fifty people had been injured, mostly police. Over 60 police vehicles had been either destroyed or damaged, along with 21 city transit buses. At least 31 businesses had been looted or damaged and losses to both city and private property totaled in the hundreds of thousands of dollars.

Many of the new Latino immigrants to the Mount Pleasant area had come from Central America, fleeing violence and seeking work. While there had been some friction between the police and the local community due to language and cultural differences, there had been no major outbreaks of trouble. In the months leading up to the riot, increasing levels of street crime and drug-related violence had fueled racial tensions among black, Hispanic, and white residents, which the Mount Pleasant riot brought to the forefront of the city's attention.

Only 140 of the city's police officers were Hispanic, and the community's Hispanic population had perceived oppression from the police force for some time. In the time leading up to the riots, residents often complained that police were stopping Hispanics and asking them for immigration papers for petty offenses that were ignored when committed by whites. Hispanic residents cited these tensions as a major factor sparking the riots.

In the years leading up to the riots, a predominantly white group of homeowners had been pressing police to reduce public drunkenness, urination, littering, aggressive panhandling, and other quality-of-life issues in the neighborhood. At the same time the Mount Pleasant Advisory and Neighborhood Commission, a quasi-governmental neighborhood organization, blamed many of Mount Pleasant street's problems on the easy availability of alcohol and its sale to already inebriated customers. Some Black and Hispanic residents perceived these efforts to crack down on alcohol sales as an attempt to drive lower income people and the customers they served out of the neighborhood, further fueling tensions.

After the riots, the city agreed to add more bilingual officers and 9-1-1 operators, and to station more Spanish-speaking officers in heavily Latino areas. They also agreed not to ask witnesses or crime victims about their immigration status, so that more people would feel safe in coming forward to cooperate with authorities to make the community more secure.

== Mt. Pleasant Report ==
The United States Commission on Civil Rights transmitted a report in 1993 to the President and others based on the testimonials, research, and field investigations about the atmosphere after the riots and feelings of Latinos living in D.C. The Mt. Pleasant Report was the first volume in a series of Commission Reports on Racial and Ethnic Tensions in American Communities, Poverty, Inequality, and Discrimination. It analyzed reasons for Mt. Pleasant riots and assessed other riots, such as the 1992 Los Angeles riots, to see if there were any correlation between the two; both came from urban upheaval.

This 200-page report concluded three main issues that affected Latinos in Washington, D.C., during that time were:

- The District of Columbia Metropolitan Police Department was perceived as conducting a practice of abuse, harassment, and misconduct against the Latino community.
- Hispanic participation in the District of Columbia government was not proportionate to the community's portion of the general population of the District of Columbia.
- The Latino community was not receiving its fair share of the government services.

== Legacy ==
The DC Mayor's Office of Latino Affairs since then has made some progress with the Latino community. The 2008 Performance Accountability Report showed that more Latino organizations were getting city funds, more Latino parents were taking a bigger role in the public schools, and the government was readily making information available in Spanish.

== See also ==
- List of incidents of civil unrest in the United States
- 1968 Washington, D.C., riots
- Washington race riot of 1919
