= Timber Pizza =

Pizzeria chain based in Washington, D.C., US

Timber Pizza Co.
- Timber Pizza's Petworth location in 2016
- Type: Restaurant chain
- Industry: Pizzeria
- Founded: 2014; 12 years ago in Washington, D.C., U.S.
- Founders: Andrew Dana; Chris Brady
- Number of locations: 11 (2026)
- Area served: Mid-Atlantic region
- Key people: Andrew Dana (co-founder); Chris Brady (co-founder, president); Daniela Moreira (co-owner); Luke Watson (CEO); Fred Fried (executive chairman)
- Revenue: $11.6 million (2025)
- Website: timberpizza.com

Timber Pizza Co. is an American Neapolitan-style pizzeria chain based in the Washington, D.C., area. It was founded by Andrew Dana and Chris Brady in 2014 serving farmers' markets and outdoor events from a mobile pizza oven trailer. Chef Daniela Moreira joined the business in 2015, and the company opened its first brick-and-mortar location in Washington's Petworth neighborhood in 2016. The pizzeria became a popular and critically acclaimed restaurant and was recognized by Bon Appétit, The Washington Post, Eater and the Michelin Guide's Bib Gourmand list. It offers 12-inch (30 cm) pizzas, as well as empanadas, baked in a wood-fired oven. Timber began expanding through franchising in 2021 and as of 2026 has 11 locations in the Washington area, Virginia and the Carolinas.

== History ==
=== Founding ===
Chris Brady serves a Green Monster pizza at a farmers' market in 2016.

Timber's 1967 Chevy pickup truck parked on Upshur Street in Petworth

Andrew Dana developed the concept for Timber while pursuing his MBA in New York City. Returning to his hometown of Washington, D.C., he worked for an educational software startup before deciding to start Timber Pizza Company full-time.

Dana and his business partner Chris Brady started Timber Pizza Company in 2014. They rented space in restaurant incubator Union Kitchen, which helped them realize they were not yet ready to open a brick-and-mortar pizzeria. They purchased a mobile pizza oven trailer, pulled by a powder-blue 1967 Chevrolet pickup, and began baking pies at D.C.-area farmers' markets. While making pizzas near the U.S. Department of Agriculture in 2015, Dana met Argentine chef Daniela Moreira and eventually hired her. With her culinary training, Moreira professionalized Timber's operation. Early on, their handwritten pizza dough recipe didn't include actual measurements. "It was two yellow scoops of yeast, because we had a yellow tablespoon, and a blue scoop of salt," Dana said. "If we had ever lost those measuring utensils, we would have been screwed."

=== First storefront location ===
Timber's first location, a 36-seat storefront, opened in Petworth in 2016 and became a popular neighborhood spot. In addition to pizza, the menu offered empanadas due to Moreira's influence. In 2017, the restaurant was sourcing its ingredients from local farmers. That year, Timber was named to Bon Appétit magazine's list of the 50 best new restaurants and was favorably reviewed by Washington Post food critic Tom Sietsema, who praised the "quirky details" in the restaurant's small Petworth location. Timber Pizza was added to Michelin's Bib Gourmand list for Washington in 2019. By 2025, the Petworth location saw $2.1 million in annual sales.

=== Expansion ===
Timber's location at Ronald Reagan Washington National Airport's E concourse

Timber began franchising locations in 2021, bringing in a new CEO from Marriott International to join Brady and Dana and a sports agency executive as chairman. By 2025, the company had eight locations (six of them franchised) in the greater Washington area and the Carolinas, with a plan to add up to 10 new locations each year. Timber also continues to operate pizza oven trailers at outdoor markets and events.

By 2026, the chain had 11 locations and notched $11.6 million in 2025 sales, with over $14.5 million in sales projected for 2026. As of November 2026, Timber had locations in the greater Washington area (including Reagan National Airport); Richmond, Virginia; the Raleigh-Durham, North Carolina, area; and Charleston, South Carolina.

== Menu ==
Timber serves 12-inch pizzas. Popular pizzas include the Bentley, which has a tomato sauce base with cured chorizo, soppressata, sweet peppers and spicy honey; the Green Monster, with pesto, feta, kale and shaved zucchini; the Julia, a heavy layer of snow peas, asparagus and pea-shoot-based pesto; and the Pretty in Pepperoni, which includes basil leaves. The Green Monster was ranked as one of the Washington area's "essential dishes" by the Washington Post in 2016. Timber's pizza dough is hand-rolled and fermented for 48 hours. The menu also offers salads and empanadas. Timber offers counter service for most diners and full service for patrons seated at its bar.

== See also ==
- Call Your Mother
