= Call Your Mother (restaurant) =

American deli chain

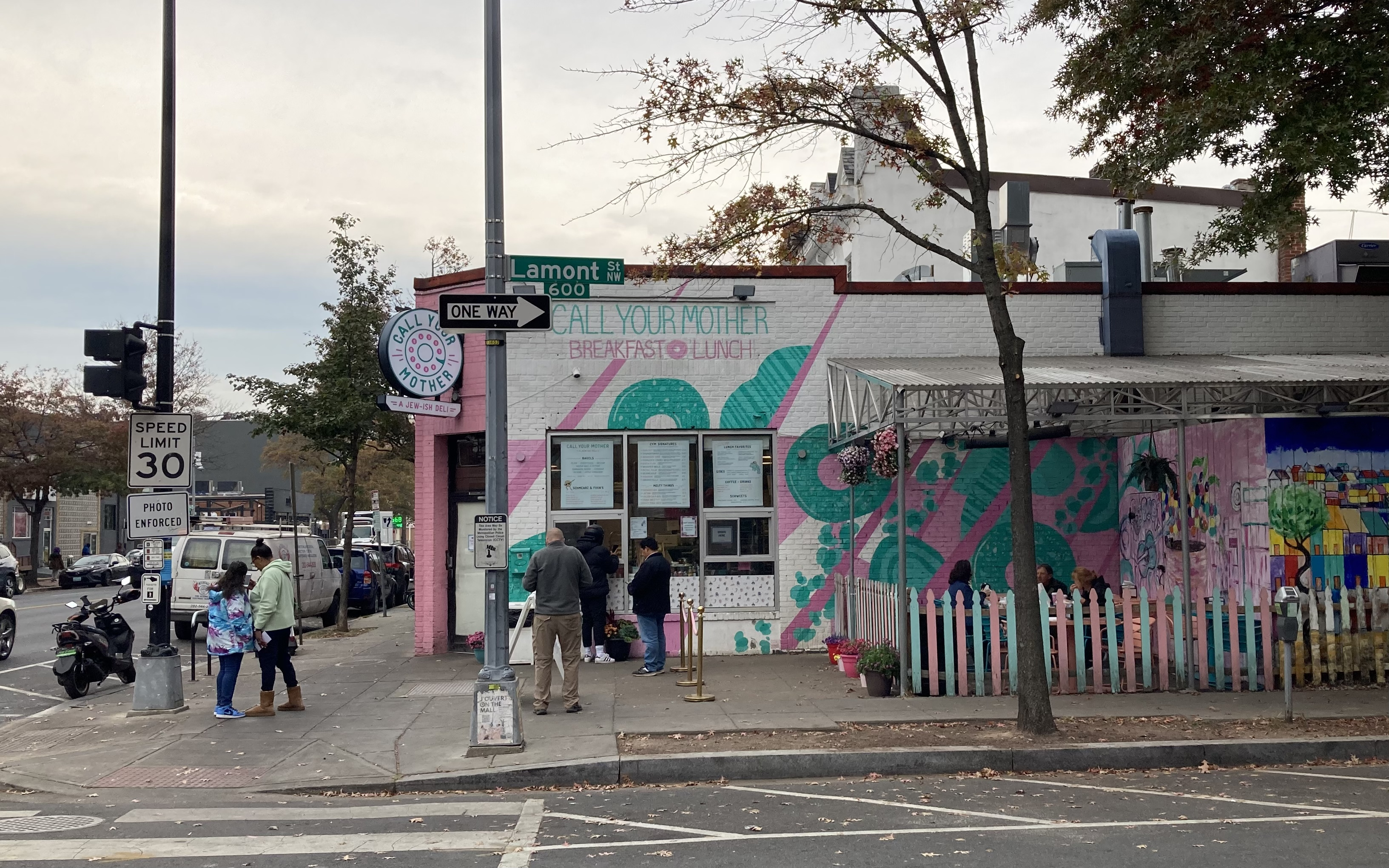
- The original Call Your Mother deli on Georgia Avenue NW in Park View, Washington, D.C.
- Type: Private
- Industry: Restaurants
- Genre: Delicatessen
- Founded: October 2018; 8 years ago
- Founders: Andrew Dana; Daniela Moreira
- Headquarters: Washington, D.C., US
- Number of locations: 33 (November 2026)
- Area served: Florida; Colorado; Illinois; Pennsylvania Maryland; Virginia; Washington, D.C.
- Products: Bagels, sandwiches
- Number of employees: 150 (2022)
- Website: callyourmotherdeli.com

Call Your Mother is an American fast casual delicatessen chain focusing on bagels and bagel sandwiches. Founded by Timber Pizza co-founders Andrew Dana and Daniela Moreira, its first location opened in Park View, Washington, D.C., in October 2018. As of November 2026, Call Your Mother had 33 locations in the Washington, D.C., Denver, Chicago, Philadelphia, and Miami metro areas.

== History ==
Call Your Mother grew out of founder Andrew Dana's lifelong interest in bagels. Washington native Dana had partnered with Chris Brady and Daniela Moreira to launch Timber Pizza's first brick and mortar location in Petworth in 2016. Over the course of 2017 and 2018, Dana and Moreira developed their own bagel recipe and a concept for a "Jew-ish deli" informed by traditional Jewish delicatessens. They described their bagels as a cross between the sweetness of Montreal-style bagels and the fluffier texture of New York-style bagels. CYM bagels are boiled, then baked in a wood-fired oven. In addition to Dana and Moreira, passive investors in Call Your Mother included Jeff Zients, a senior official in the Obama administration and Chief of Staff in the Biden administration.

Call Your Mother's first location opened on Georgia Avenue NW in Washington, D.C., in October 2018. Other locations followed, and Call Your Mother was recognized as one of America's best new restaurants by Bon Appétit in 2019. Growth slowed only slightly during the COVID-19 pandemic; after a two-week closure, Call Your Mother reopened with a focus on pickup and delivery and did not lay off any employees. In Washington, D.C.'s West End, a Call Your Mother location opened in the lobby of Yours Truly DC in 2020.

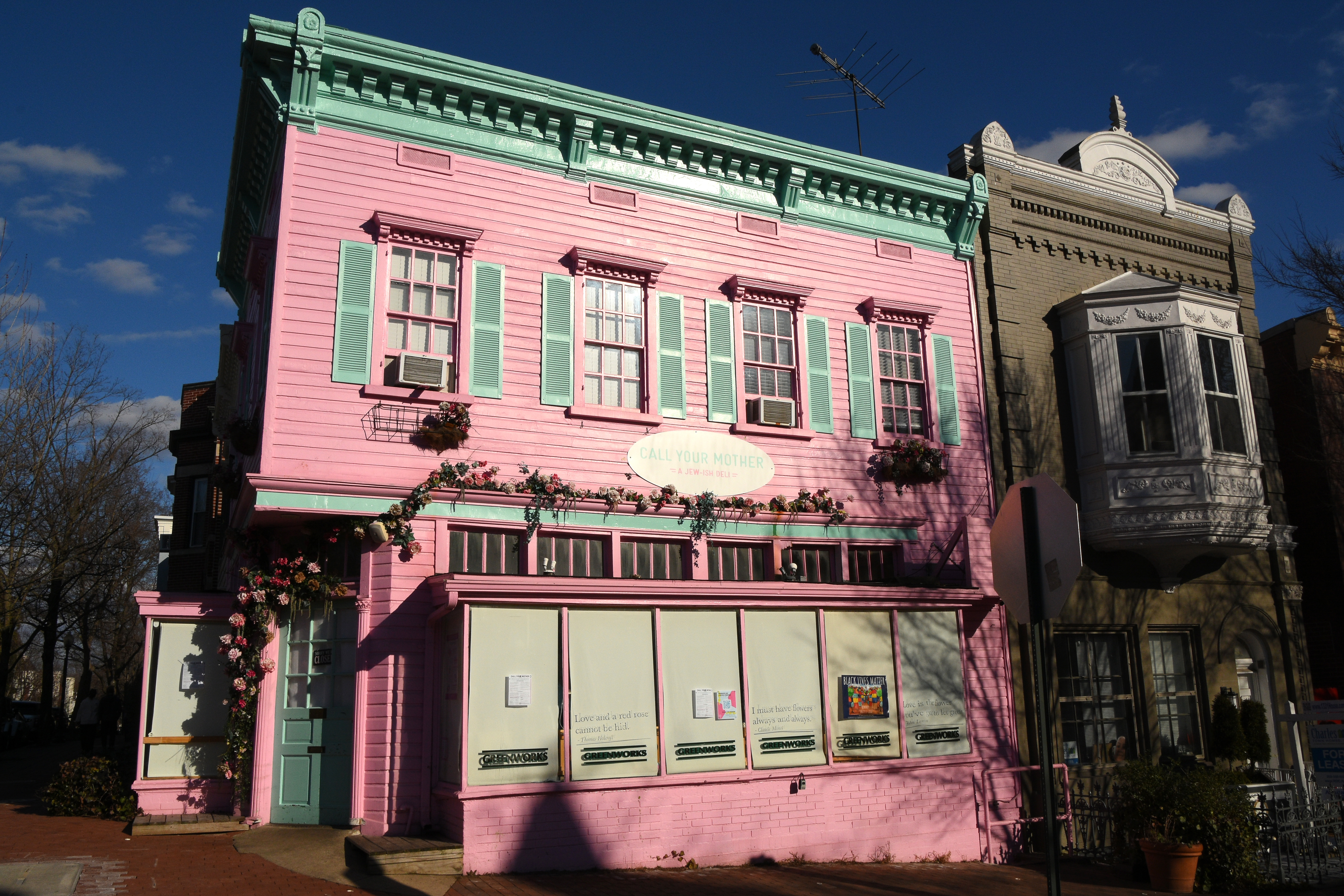
The Georgetown location visited by Joe Biden in 2021

In January 2021, Call Your Mother's Georgetown location became the first restaurant visited by newly inaugurated President Joe Biden when his motorcade passed by on his way back from church. Call Your Mother bagels were frequently catered for "bagel Wednesdays" by White House staff. Zients, then serving as White House coronavirus response coordinator, had divested his stake in the restaurant prior to joining the Biden administration. The Call Your Mother stop was "a much-needed boost" to the pandemic-battered D.C. restaurant industry, according to Kathy Hollinger of the Restaurant Association of Metropolitan Washington. "I think that, psychologically, it gives the kind of lift that not only the small-business operators need, but also the residents who are very invested into this community and who are such supportive diners. They like to see that the president is also connected in that way."

Call Your Mother opened its first location outside of the D.C. area in May 2023, when it expanded to Denver. In 2023, Call Your Mother was recognized by Bon Appétit as having one of the best bagels in the United States. In 2025, Call Your Mother sold a majority stake of ownership to the private equity firm Invus. By November 2026, Call Your Mother had 33 locations in the Washington, D.C., Denver, Chicago, Philadelphia, and Miami metro areas.

== Menu ==
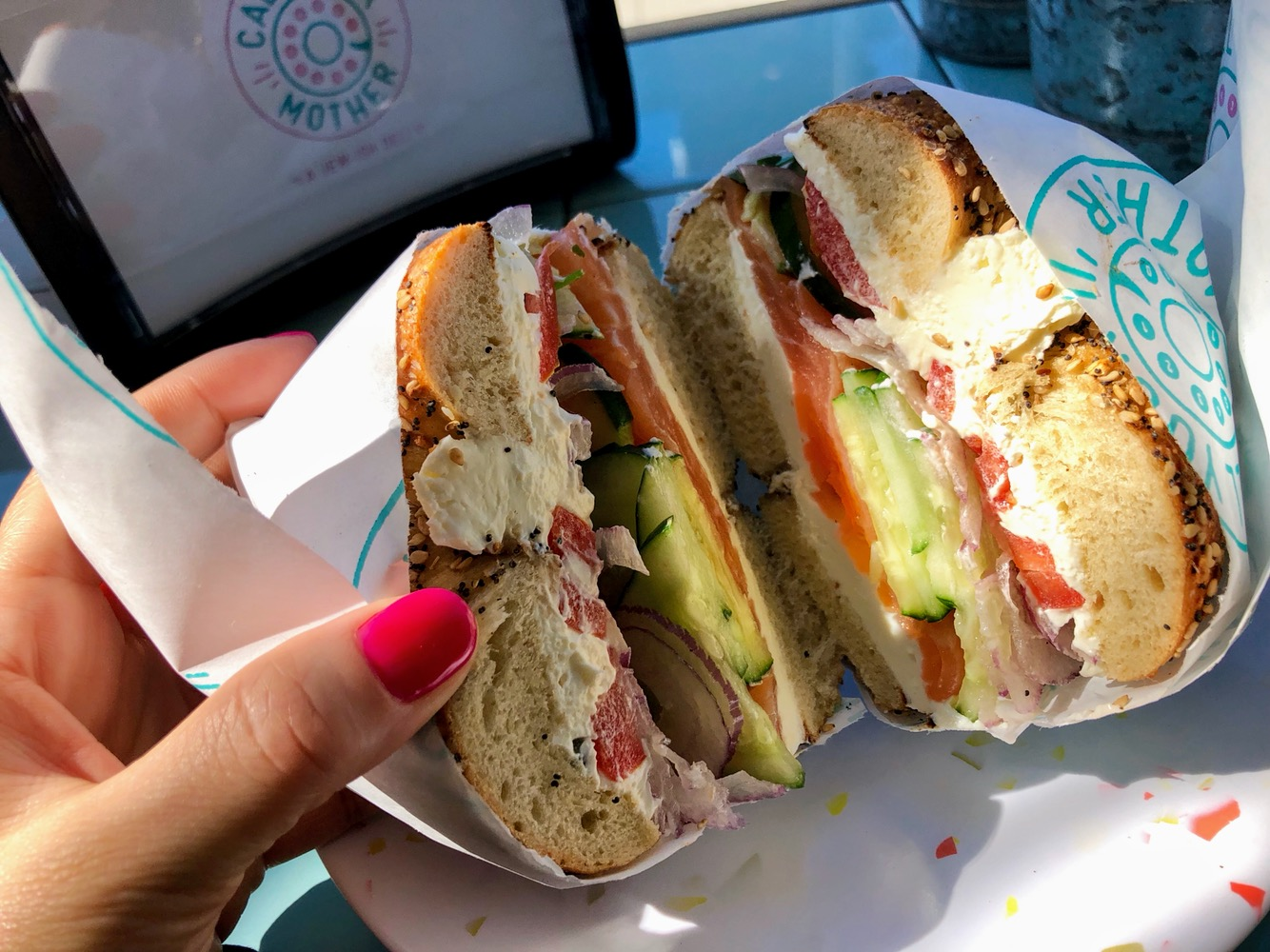
A Call Your Mother bagel sandwich

The backbone of Call Your Mother's menu includes a variety of bagels (including everything, za'atar, sesame, cheese, and maple salt and pepper) and specialty schmears (such as garlic-herb, roasted vegetable and candied salmon cream cheeses). Specialty bagel sandwiches include the "Sun City" (bacon or pastrami, bodega-style eggs, cheese and spicy honey), the "Mountain View" (mashed avocado, bodega-style eggs, latkes and cheese) and the "Gleneagle" (candied salmon cream cheese, cucumber, crispy shallots and lettuce). Call Your Mother also offers traditional deli sandwiches on challah and rye as well as baked goods.

== See also ==
- List of Ashkenazi Jewish restaurants
