= Alta Gracia =

- City
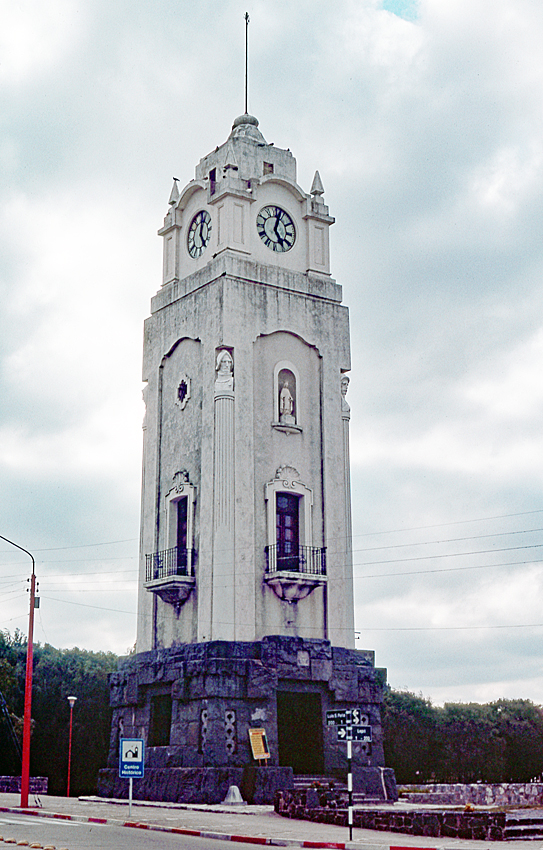
- Alta Gracia clock tower and memorial

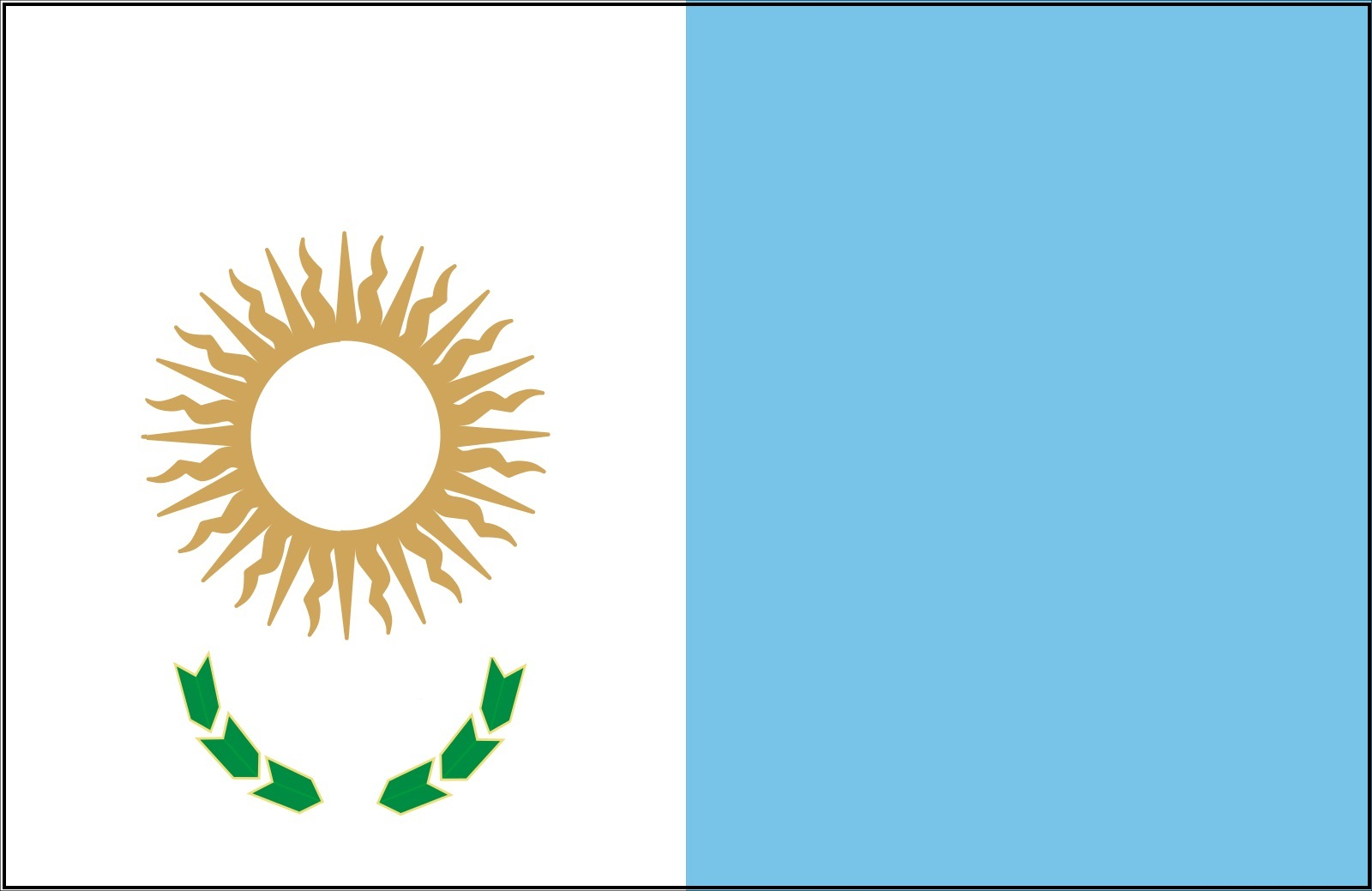
- Flag

- Location of Alta Gracia in Argentina
- Coordinates: 31°40′S 64°26′W
- Country: Argentina
- Province: Córdoba
- Department: Santa María

Government
  - Intendant: Marcos Torres (UCR)
- Elevation: 553 m (1,814 ft)

Population (2022 census)
  - Total: 60.373
- Time zone: UTC−3 (ART)
- CPA base: X5186
- Dialing code: +54 3547
- Website: Official website

Alta Gracia is a city located in the north-centre of the province of Córdoba, Argentina. Its name means "High Grace". It is built upon the Sierras Chicas, in a region that the Comechingón Indians used to call Paravachasca. It has about 43,000 inhabitants (2001 census [INDEC]).

== History ==
In the 17th century, Alta Gracia was a large ranch (an estancia) operated by Jesuits. It had been first owned in 1588 by Don Juan Nieto who began the colonization of the area. Under the terms of his encomienda, Nieto began promoting the building of houses, ranches and stone pens. The Jesuits used Alta Gracia, along with other ranches, including Colonia Caroya, Jesús María, Santa Catalina, La Candelaria, and San Ignacio de los Ejercicios, to support the Collegium Maximum or "Colegio Máximo", one of Argentina's first universities (Universitas Cortuba Tucumanæ) today: Universidad Nacional de Córdoba.

Together with other educational institutes, it is now part of the Manzana Jesuítica ("Jesuit Block"), an important center in Córdoba City. The Jesuit Block and Estancias of Córdoba were named as a UNESCO World Heritage Site in 2000.

Owners of the Estancia Alta Gracia:

- Don Juan Nieto, 1588
- Alonso Nieto de Herrera, who named it after "Nuestra Señora de Alta Gracia"
- The Society of Jesus (donated to them by Alonso Nieto)
- Santiago de Liniers, 1810, who lived there for about 5 months
- José Manuel Solares, 1868 (last owner; in his will he converted the estancia to a village, to be called La Merced. He divided the land into plots to give to his employees. The condition was that they would keep the Tajamar and continue with veneration of the Virgin, known as Nuestra Señora de la Merced - "Our Lady of Merced".) September 24 is a feast day in Alta Gracia, in honour of the Virgin.

== Main sights ==
Sights include:

- The museum of Santiago de Liniers.
- "El Tajamar", a man-made lake.
- "El Obraje", a workshop were the Jesuits taught many Indians the different crafts.
- The Sierras Hotel, which John F. Kennedy has visited.
- A house where revolutionary Che Guevara used to live, now a museum.
- Manuel de Falla's Museum.
- Gabriel Dubois Art Museum.
- Railroad outdoor museum.
- Lourdes Virgin's Sanctuary: a replica of the original in the Pyrenees (France).
- Public Clock Tower: 350th Anniversary of Alta Gracia Monument, now an information office.

== Notable people ==
- Manuel de Falla, Spanish musician and composer, lived in Alta Gracia from 1942 until his death.
- Ernesto "Che" Guevara, spent 12 years in Alta Gracia, from 1932 till 1944, when he moved to Buenos Aires to be a doctor. There is a museum in the place where he lived.
- Daniela Moreira, Argentine-American chef and restaurateur

== Gallery ==
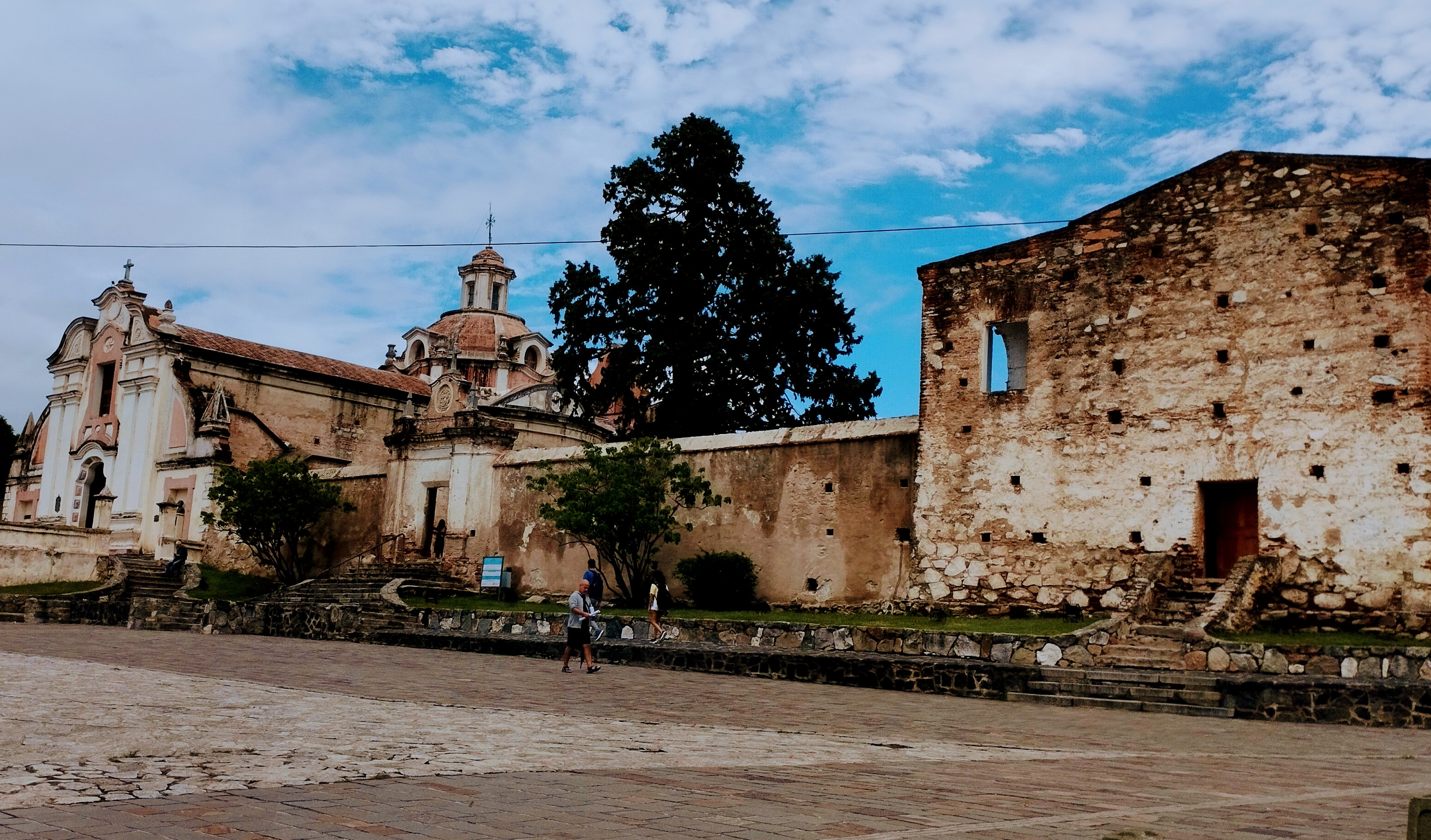

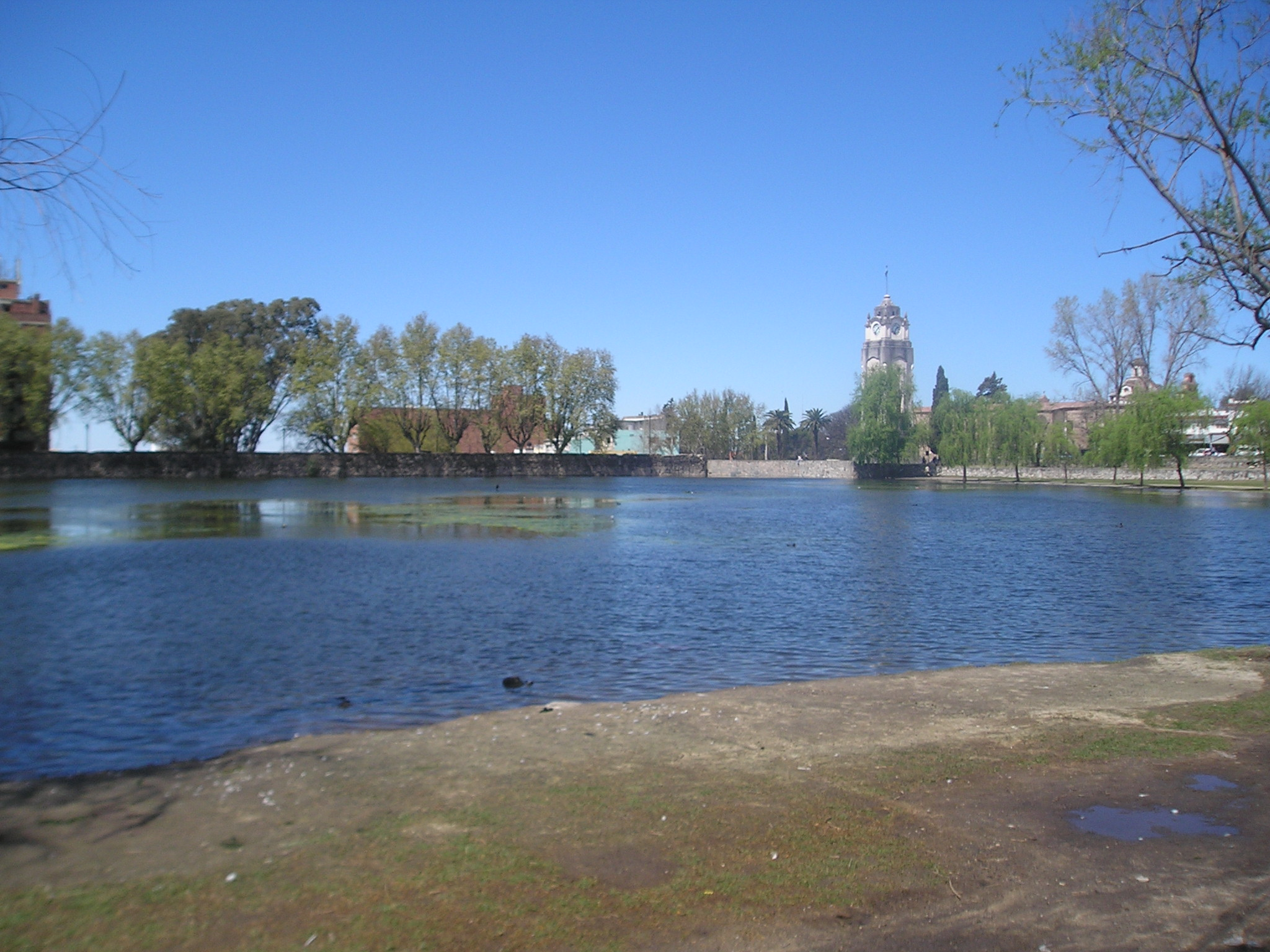

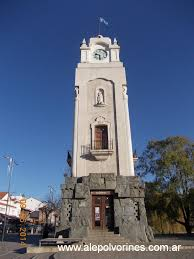

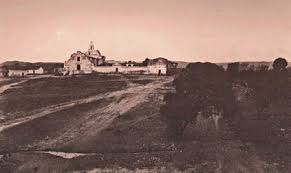

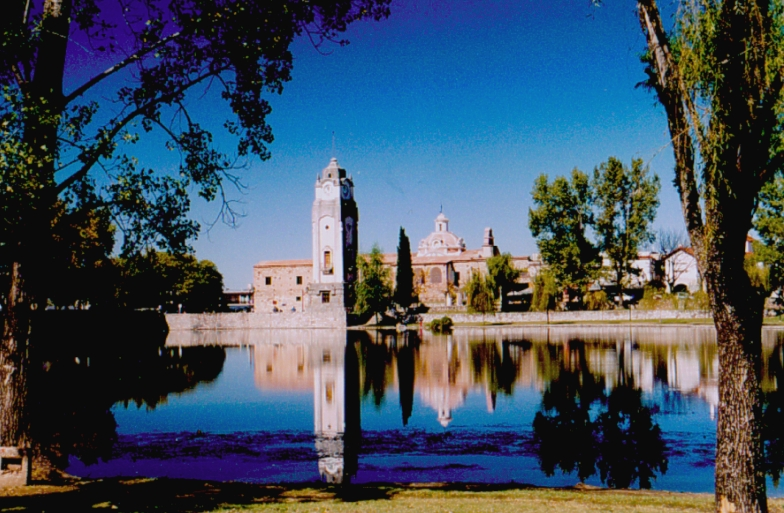

== Sources ==
- Official website (in Spanish)
- Municipal information: Municipal Affairs Federal Institute (IFAM), Municipal Affairs Secretariat, Ministry of Interior, Argentina. (in Spanish) (in Spanish)
