= Mount Pleasant Library =

Public library in Washington, D.C., US

Coordinates: 38.9305°N 77.0372°W

The Mount Pleasant Library at 1600 Lamont Street, NW in Washington, DC is a branch of the District of Columbia Public Library System that opened in May 1925, and is the third oldest public library building still in use in Washington.

== History ==
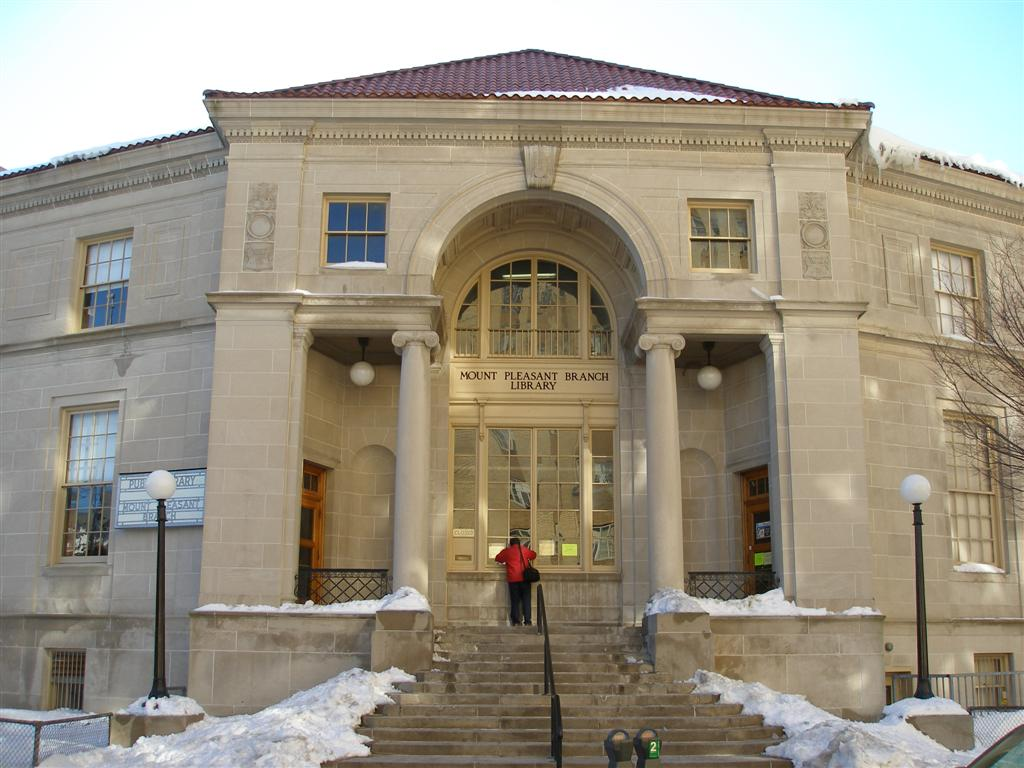
The library in 2010

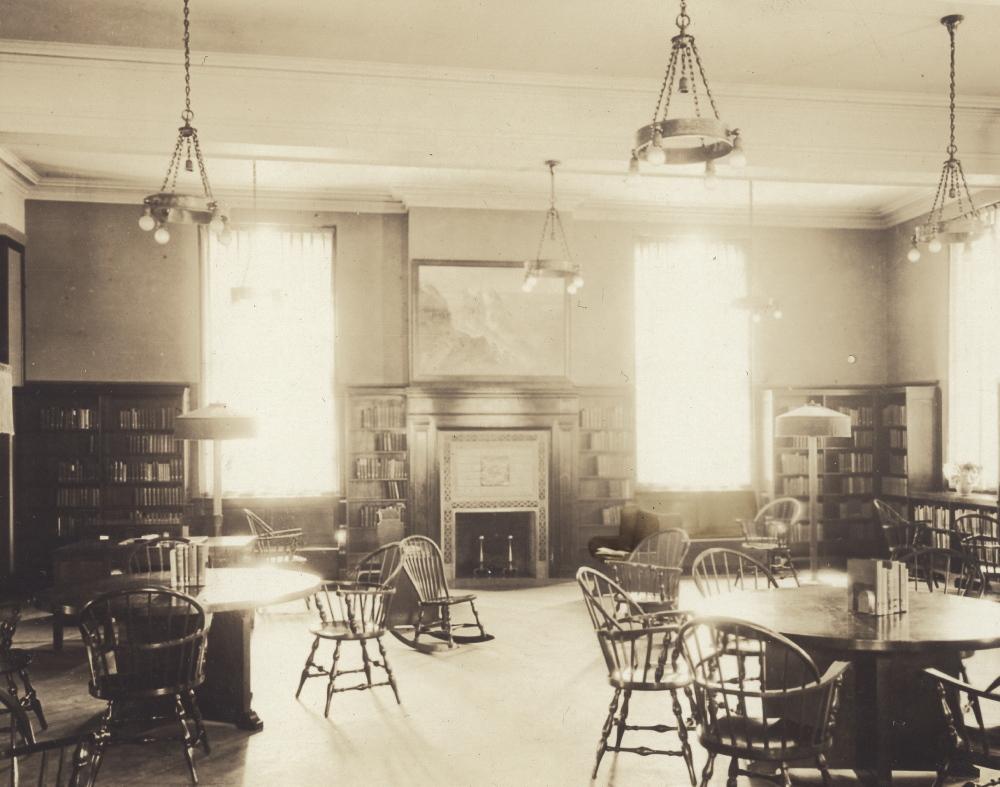
Interior of the library ca. 1925

Construction of the Mount Pleasant Branch was funded primarily by the Carnegie Corporation and was built to serve the rapidly growing communities of Mount Pleasant and Columbia Heights. The architect, Edward Lippincott Tilton of New York City, was an accomplished library designer who planned numerous libraries nationwide. The library site at Lamont and 16th Streets was made available for purchase by Mary Foote Henderson who was instrumental in the development of 16th Street in the early 20th century. The Italian Renaissance design of the building harmonizes with the monumental architecture of the churches and embassies that line 16th Street. The Mount Pleasant Neighborhood Library stands in the Mount Pleasant National Register Historic District designated in 1987.

The Mount Pleasant Library was the third and last DC Neighborhood Library to be built with Carnegie funding. Andrew Carnegie had funded the construction of the Central Library and, at its dedication in 1903, he offered to finance branch buildings as they were needed. Congress was slow to authorize the acceptance of his offer. In 1910, it authorized acceptance of funds for the first Carnegie-funded neighborhood library which opened in Takoma Park in 1911. By the time the Board of Library Trustees next sought funds for a neighborhood library, Carnegie had died without providing in his will for the construction of additional libraries. The Carnegie Corporation honored the promise by granting the Trustees’ requests for the funding of two more branches, the Southeast branch in 1921 and Mount Pleasant branch in 1923.

One of the most distinguishing features of the building today is the murals painted during the 1930s by Aurelius Battaglia under a Works Progress Administration program. The murals depict a fantastical world where the animals take over the circus. With the lion as the ringmaster and the hippos as ballerinas, the murals may have served as studies for Walt Disney's Fantasia for which Battaglia worked as an illustrator years later.

In October 2012, the District of Columbia completed an $11.5 million renovation and expansion of the historic building. The project included expanding into a new building at the rear of the property and a glass atrium linking to two spaces. There is a new 100-person meeting room as well as dedicated space for teens. The lower level houses adult non-fiction while the main level contains adult fiction and a large collection of Spanish-language materials. The upper level is dedicated to children and includes a performance space and a dedicated space for very young children. The project removed a three-level stack of cast-iron shelving and a sunroom and aimed to reach a minimum of LEED Silver for its sustainability and energy efficiency.

== In literature ==
- Florence King spoke of going to the Library branch with her father in her memoir, Confessions of a Failed Southern Lady.

== See also ==
- District of Columbia Public Library
- List of Carnegie libraries in Washington, D.C.
- Mount Pleasant, Washington, D.C.
