= Bar del Monte =

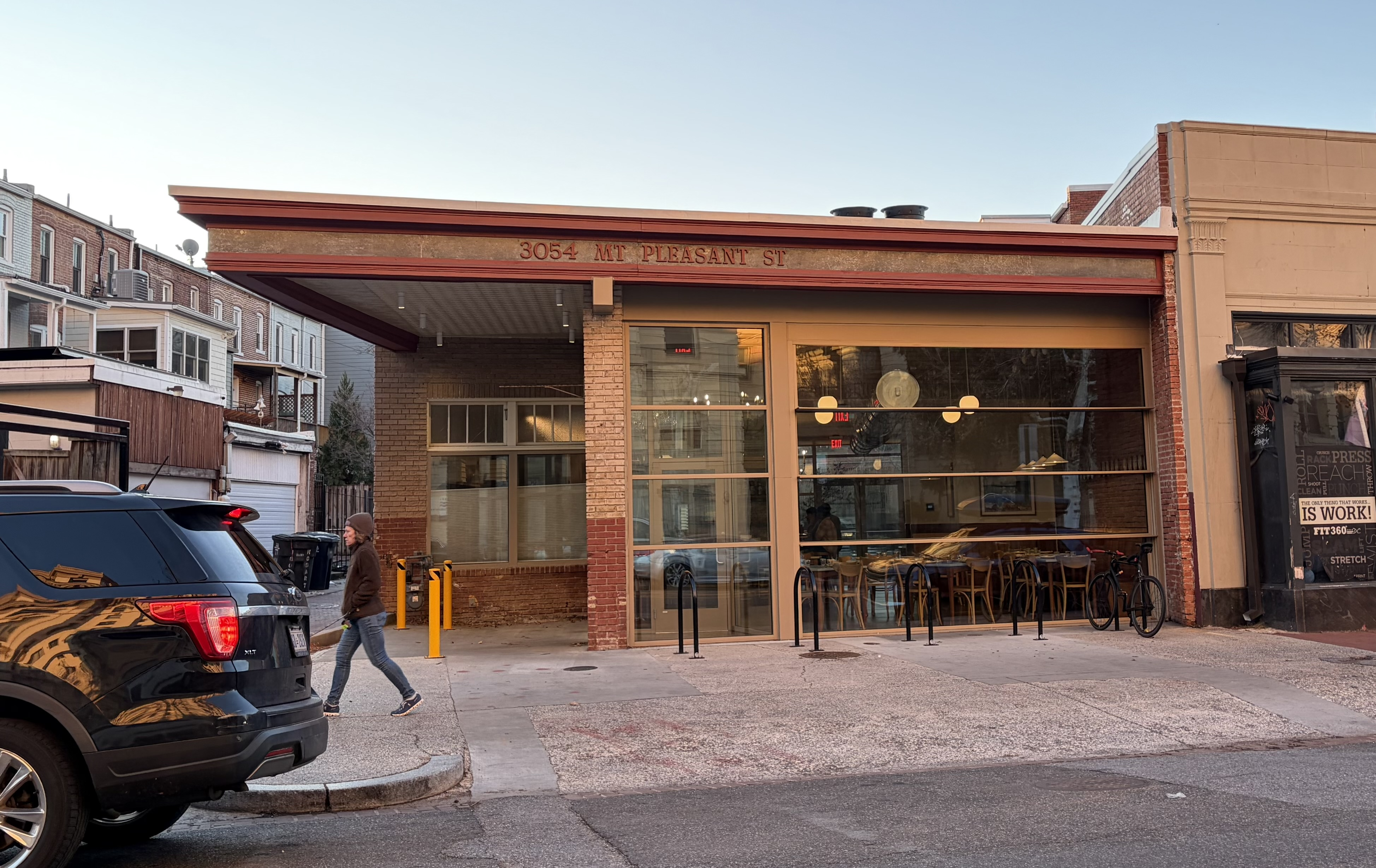
- The restaurant's exterior in 2025
- Interactive map of Bar del Monte

Restaurant information
- Established: March 8, 2024
- Owners: Peter and Oliver Pastan
- Head chef: Oliver Pastan
- Food type: Italian
- Location: 3054 Mount Pleasant Street NW, Washington D.C., 20009, United States
- Coordinates: 38°55′42″N 77°02′15″W
- Seating capacity: 38
- Reservations: No
- Website: bardelmonte.com

Bar del Monte is a restaurant in the Mount Pleasant neighborhood of Washington, D.C., United States. It serves Italian cuisine, and opened on March 8, 2024. It was named one of the twenty best new restaurants of 2024 by Bon Appétit.
