= Yours Truly DC =

Hotel in Washington, D.C., United States

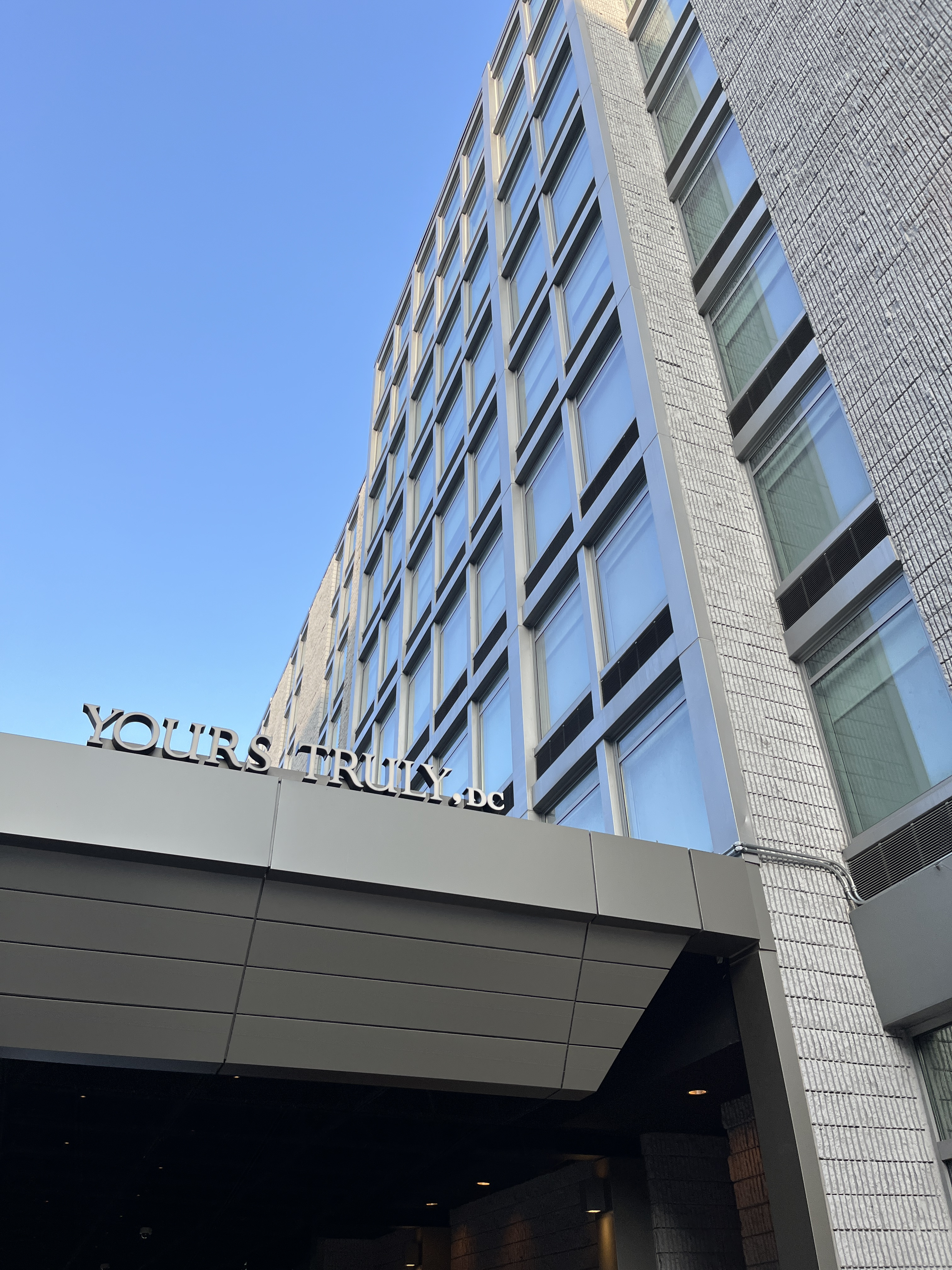
- The hotel's exterior, 2024
- Hotel chain: IHG Hotels & Resorts

General information
- Location: 1143 New Hampshire Avenue NW, Washington, D.C.
- Coordinates: 38°54′17″N 77°02′51″W
- Year built: 1971
- Opened: May 2020

Technical details
- Floor count: 9

Other information
- Number of rooms: 355

Yours Truly DC is a hotel in Washington, D.C., United States. It is operated by IHG Hotels & Resorts and has 355 rooms.

== Description ==
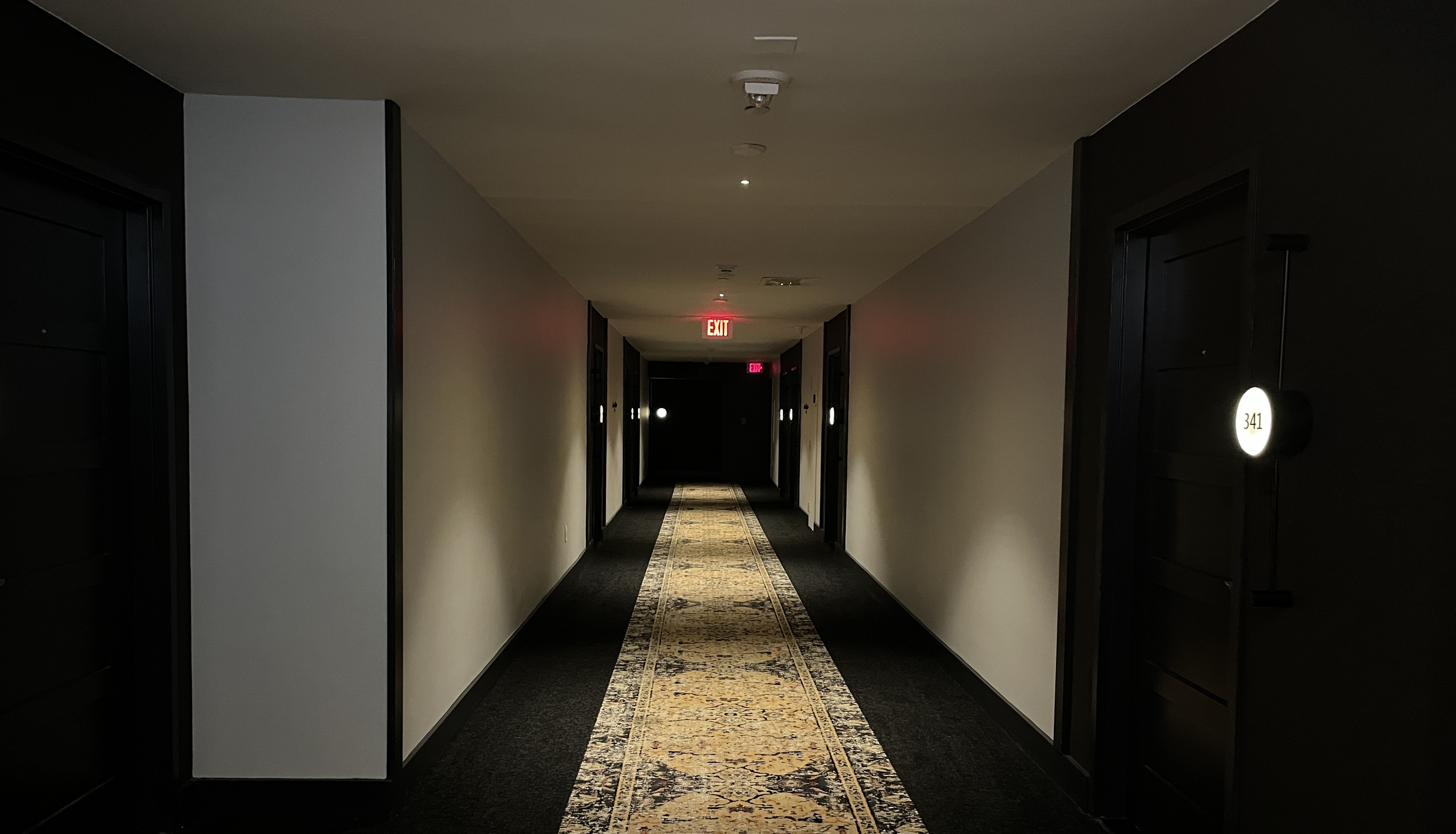
Interior hallway in 2024

Condé Nast Traveler has described Yours Truly DC as "a local-loved ... property with a boutique feel that includes destination-worthy restaurants and coworking space".

Yours Truly has an open concept main floor. A Call Your Mother location operates in the lobby. According to Condé Nast Traveler, "The massive space is set up with macrame wall hangings, leather chairs and velvet couches in 70s' burnt amber shades, and a jungle of plants." During evenings, the South American-inspired restaurant Mercy Me operates in the lobby.

== History ==
The hotel opened in May 2020.

== Reception ==
Condé Nast Traveler included Yours Truly DC in a 2024 list of the 21 best hotels in Washington, D.C.

== See also ==
- List of hotels in Washington, D.C.
