= Mount Pleasant (Washington, D.C.) =

Neighborhood of Washington, D.C.

- Neighborhood of Washington, D.C.
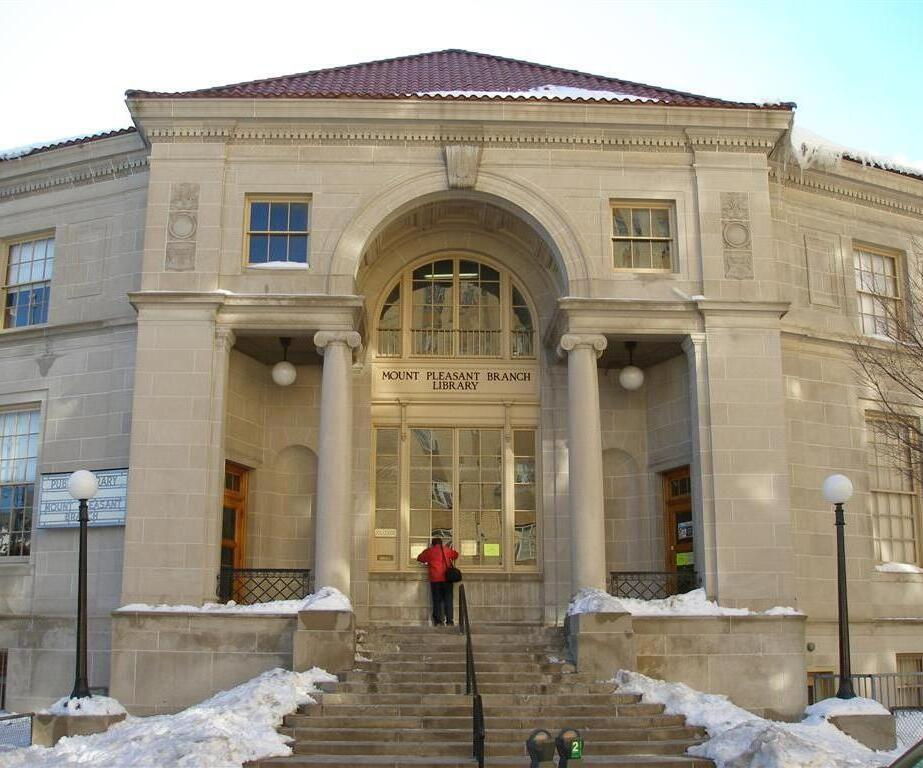
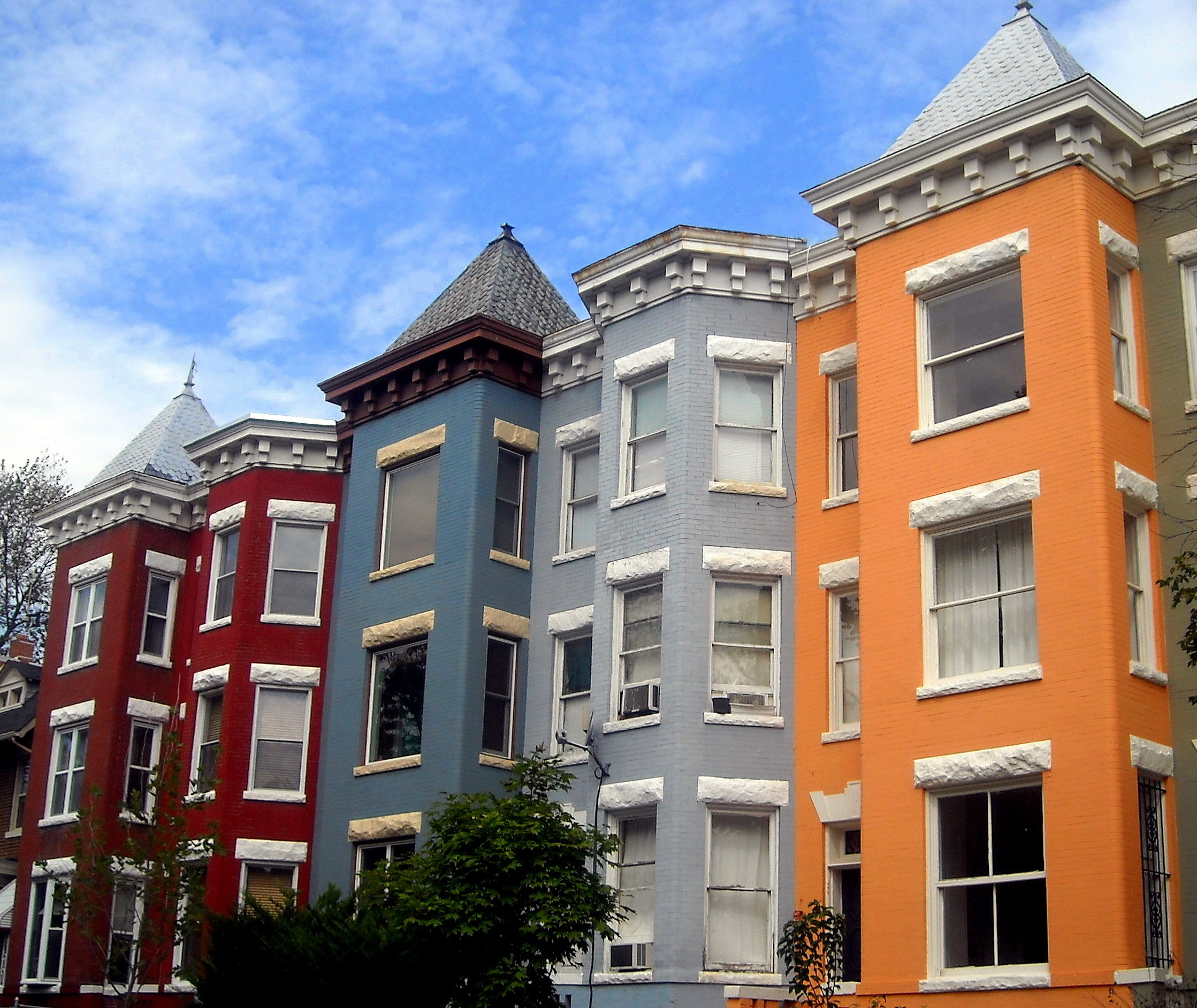
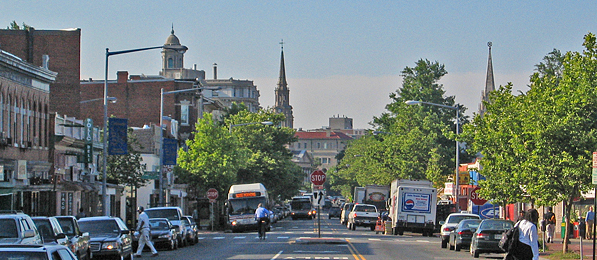
- Top: Mt. Pleasant Library (left) and Victorian townhomes (right); middle: Mt. Pleasant Street; bottom: Francis Asbury Memorial (left) and Mt. Pleasant St (right).

- Map of Washington, D.C., with Mount Pleasant highlighted in maroon.
- Coordinates: 38°55′43.3″N 77°2′14.4″W
- Country: United States
- District: Washington, D.C.
- Quadrant: Northwest
- Ward: 1
- Postal code: ZIP Code

Mount Pleasant is a neighborhood in Washington, D.C., located in Northwest D.C. The neighborhood is primarily residential, with restaurants and stores centered along a commercial corridor on Mt. Pleasant Street. Mount Pleasant is known for its unique identity and multicultural landscape, home to diverse groups such as the punk rock, the Peace Corps and Hispanic Washingtonian communities.

The neighborhood was initially developed around the Mount Pleasant Hospital, which was built and operated during the American Civil War. Following the war, the largely rural area was subdivided for real estate development. Following the advent of the D.C. streetcar system, Mt. Pleasant became Washington's first streetcar suburb and burgeoned as an affluent residential area until the mid-1940s. The neighborhood entered a period of decay following white flight and the 1968 riots in Washington, D.C. Since the 2000s, Mount Pleasant has seen urban redevelopment and gentrification.

== History ==
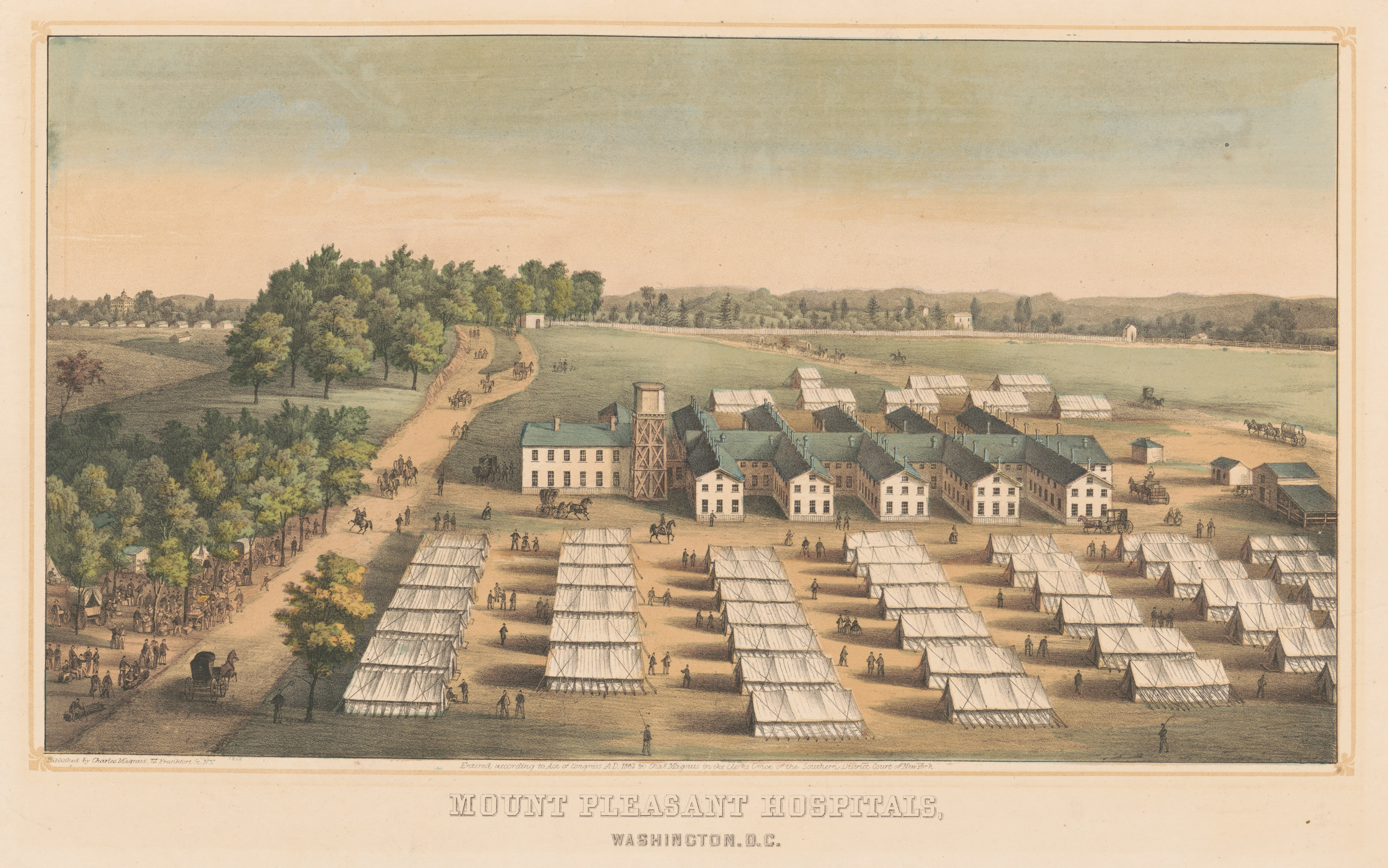
Mount Pleasant General Hospital was operated to serve Union soldiers during the U.S. Civil War.

=== 18th century ===
In 1727, Charles Calvert, 5th Baron Baltimore, then governor of the Province of Maryland, awarded a land grant for present-day Mount Pleasant to James Holmead. This estate, later named "Pleasant Plains", included the territory of present-day neighborhoods of Adams Morgan, Columbia Heights, Meridian Hill, and Pleasant Plains (which only covers a portion of the original estate of the same name).

After the creation of the District of Columbia in 1791, Pleasant Plains estate became part of Washington County, but not part of the City of Washington.

In 1794 and 1796, noted Georgetown businessman Robert Peter conducted the first land surveys in the area and created maps for tracts of some of his land in Mount Pleasant for transactions with commissioners of the city.

=== 19th century ===
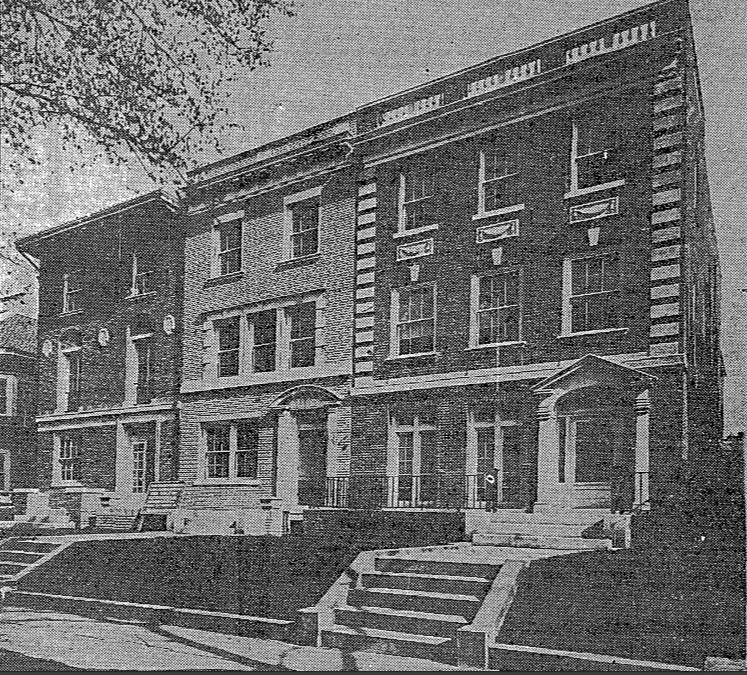
Townhomes built during the development of Mount Pleasant at the turn of the 19th and 20th centuries.

In 1861, William Selden, former Treasurer of the United States, owned 73 acres (300,000 m^{2}) of land north of Pierce Mill Road, but having been a Confederate sympathizer, was forced to sell his land at a low price and move back to Virginia. The purchaser was New England native Samuel P. Brown, who built a house and also allowed the Mount Pleasant General Hospital to be constructed on his land.

After the American Civil War, Brown began selling his land in parcels. He named the area Mount Pleasant Village because it contained the land having the highest elevation within the original Pleasant Plains estate. Brown sold all of his land except for the parcel he retained around his house at 3351 Mount Pleasant Street, NW.

In the 1870s, a horse-drawn streetcar began traveling between the Fourteenth and Park intersection to downtown Washington city, making this the first streetcar suburb in the District of Columbia. In 1878, Mount Pleasant merged into Washington when the city's boundaries became coterminous with those of the District.

=== 20th century ===
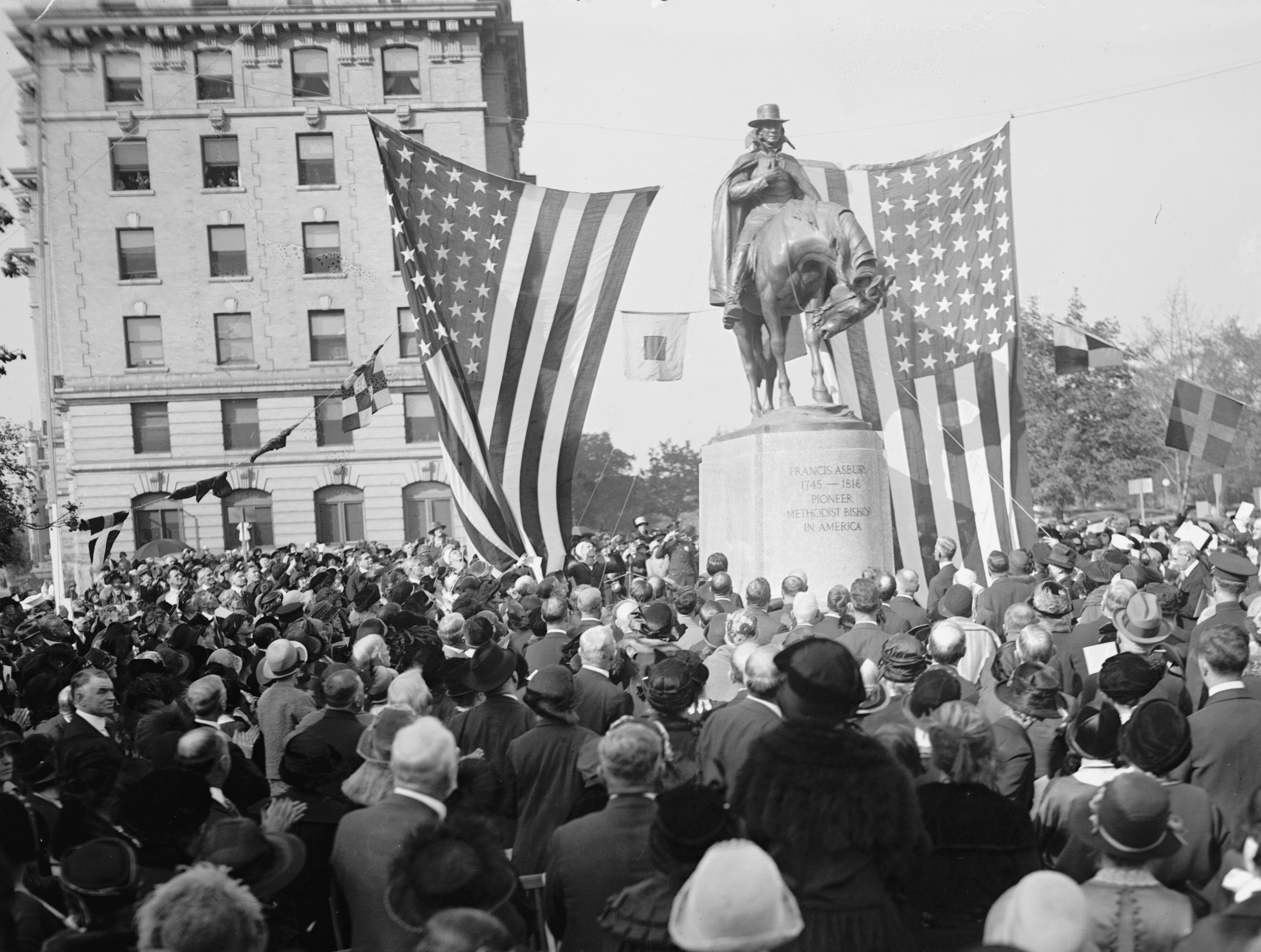
Dedication ceremony of the Francis Asbury Memorial in 1924.

In 1901, 16th Street NW was extended north of Florida Avenue, establishing the boundary of the neighborhood. Mount Pleasant developed rapidly as a streetcar suburb after the expansion of the mechanized Washington streetcars along 16 1/2 Street (now Mount Pleasant Street) in 1903. In 1907, developer Fulton R. Gordon purchased large sections of the neighborhood, marketing lots as "Mount Pleasant Heights" with Robert E. Heater. Many houses and apartment buildings were constructed between 1900 and 1925, primarily marketed to middle- to upper middle class people.

In 1925, the city built the Mount Pleasant Library, designed by Edward Lippincott Tilton and partially funded by philanthropist Andrew Carnegie.

By 1927, all homeowners in the neighborhood had signed restrictive covenants forbidding sale to African Americans. By the time of World War II, many of the row houses were converted to boarding houses, many of which were occupied by single women.

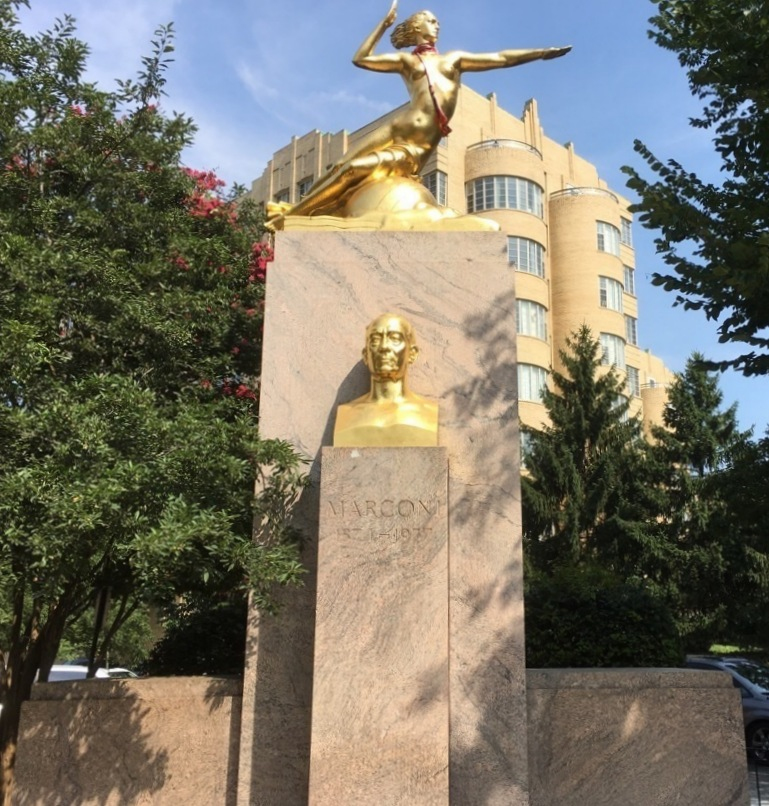
Guglielmo Marconi Memorial at Marconi Plaza, erected in 1941.

The neighborhood changed after the 1948 decision by the United States Supreme Court in the case of Shelley v. Kraemer, which struck down the restrictive covenants. After a Black Howard University professor moved into a prestigious Park Road home in 1950, some white residents began to leave the neighborhood. This White flight increased after the 1968 Washington, D.C. riots and by 1970 the neighborhood was 65% black.

Beginning in the 1960s and increasing through the 1980s, immigrants from Central America, particularly from Intipucá, El Salvador, settled in the neighborhood. The new residents developed businesses catering to Hispanic and Latino Americans along commercial portions of Mount Pleasant Street. The neighborhood also attracted former Peace Corps workers.

In 1973, the Community of Christ, a lay-led Lutheran group dedicated to social justice, bought a large building on Mount Pleasant Street and made it available rent-free to peace activists, pro-immigrant groups and musicians. In the 1980s, the group house scene flourished.

However, from the 1970s to the 1990s, the neighborhood suffered from the crack epidemic and the illegal drug trade was rampant.

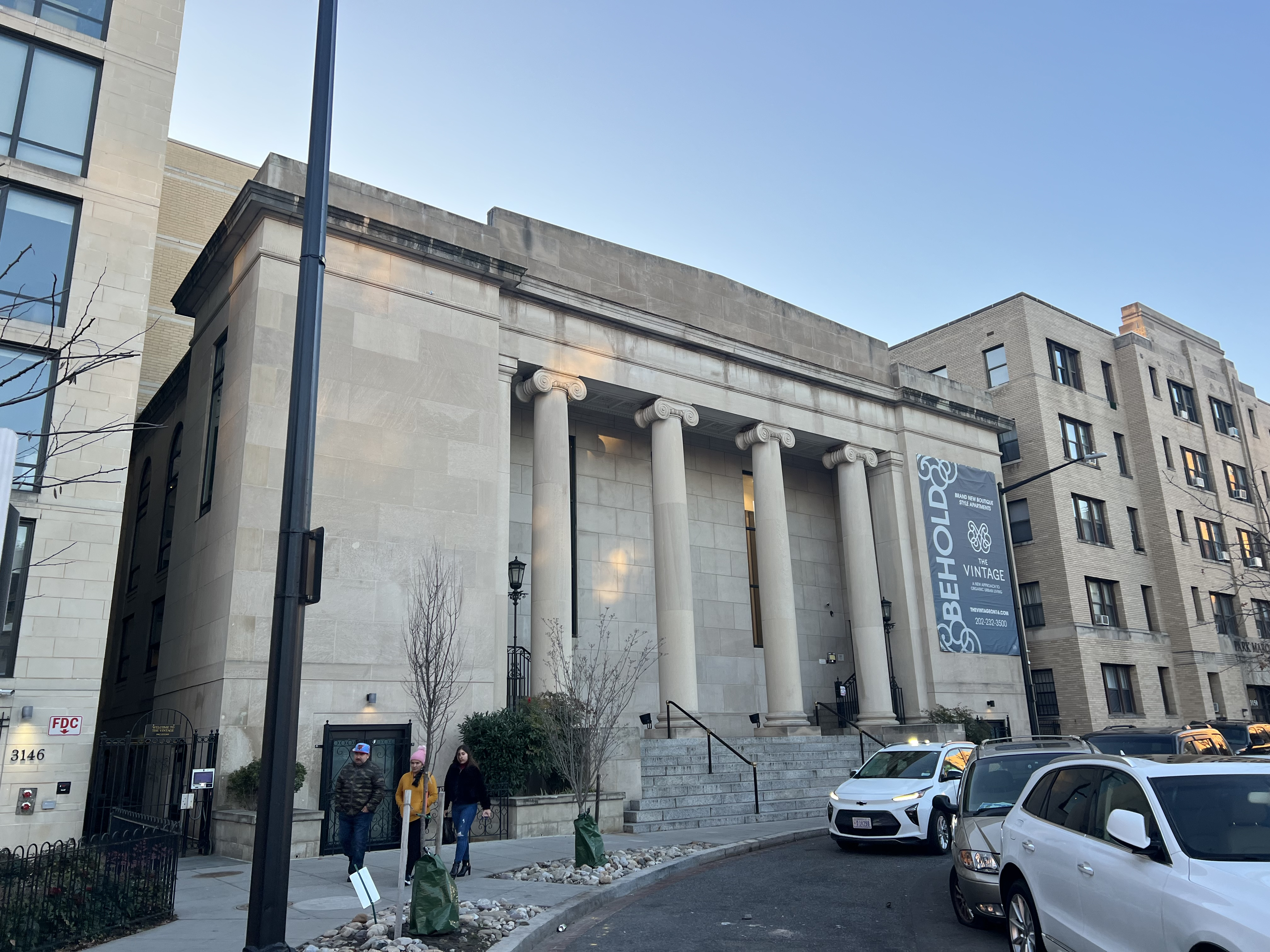
The Vintage on 16th, a historic church redeveloped into luxury apartments, in 2016.

In 1987, the neighborhood was designated as a historic district. The neighborhood was majority-minority in 1990, with African Americans making up 36% of the population, Latinos 26%, and whites 35%.

In May 1991, the Washington, D.C. riot of 1991 erupted following the shooting of Daniel Enrique Gómez by an MPD officer. The riot, which injured twelve people and destroyed several buildings in the neighborhood, was a pivotal moment in the emergence of Latino activism in DC. In response, MPD Chief Isaac Fulwood, and city government began an outreach effort to the Latino population.

=== 21st century ===
The 2010 United States census, the ZIP Code 20010, which includes Mount Pleasant, was one of the "most whitened" areas of the country, with the percentage of non-Hispanic white residents increasing from 22% in 2000 to 46.7% in 2010.

As of 2021, housing prices had risen significantly.

In 2024, Mt. Pleasant was named one of the "coolest neighborhoods in the world" by Time Out magazine.

== Geography ==
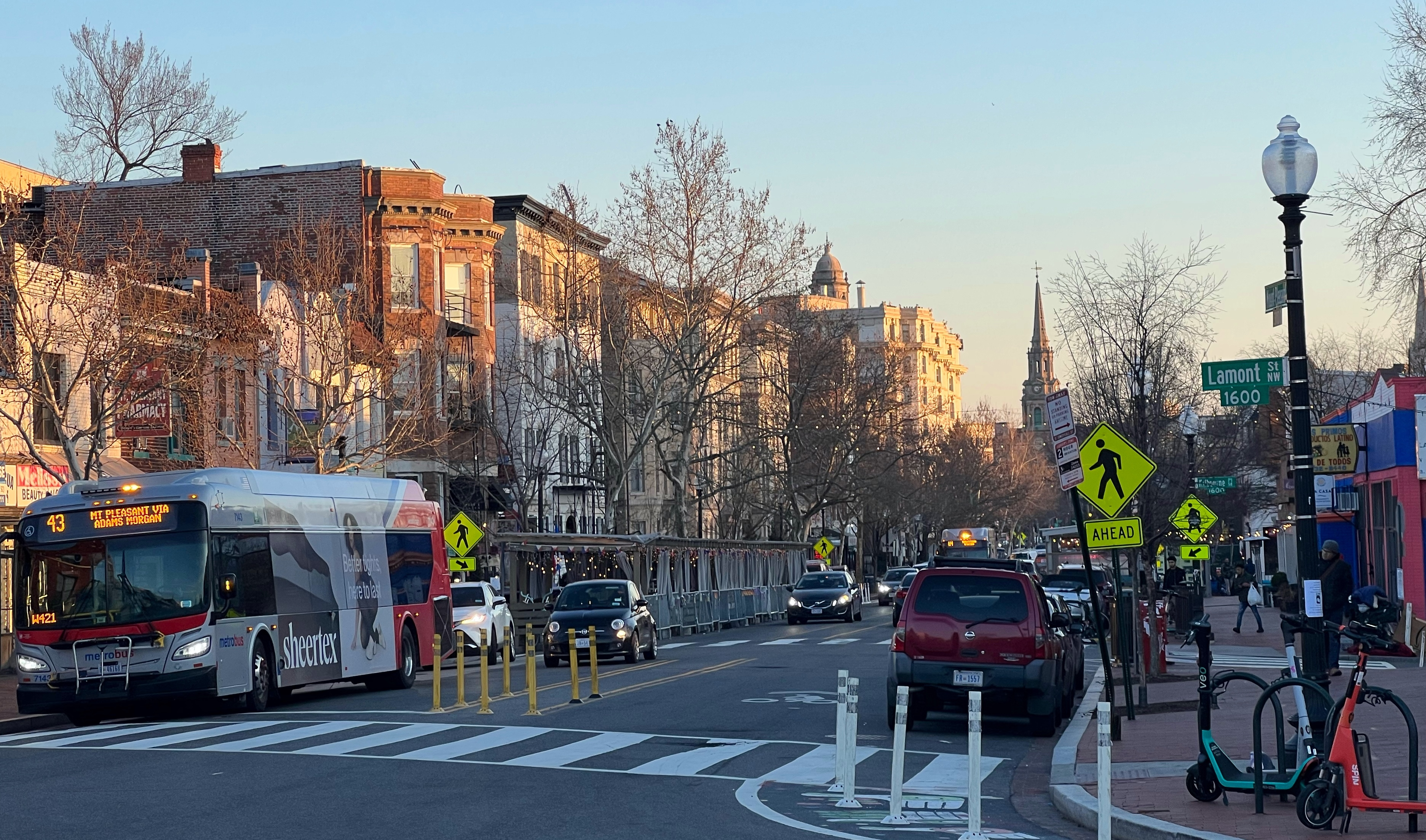
View down Mt. Pleasant Street

It is bounded by Rock Creek Park to the north and west; Harvard Street NW to the south; and 16th Street NW to the east. It is north of Adams Morgan and west of Columbia Heights.

== Demographics ==
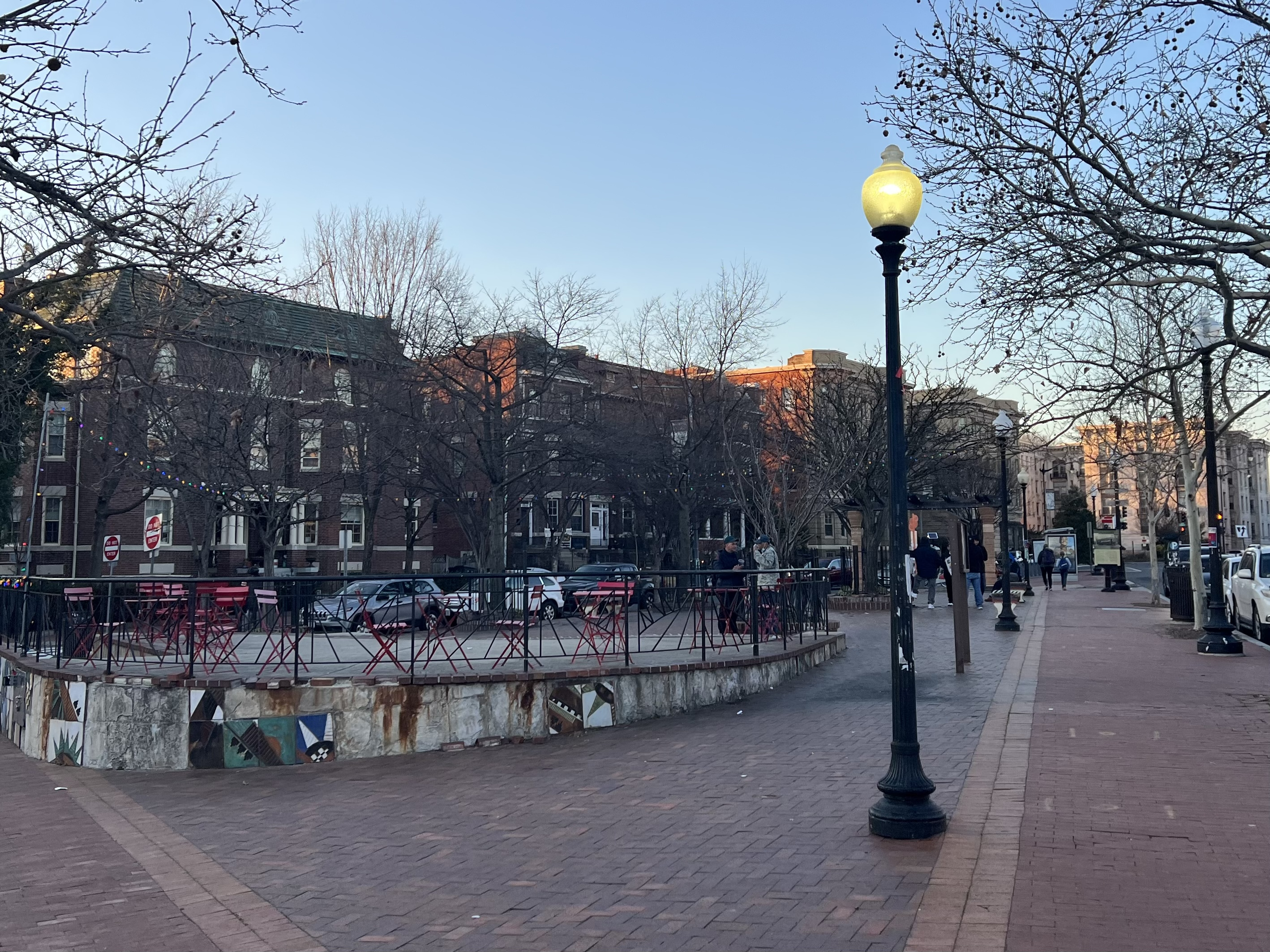
Lamont Plaza sits in the heart of the Mount Pleasant neighborhood.

The population of Mount Pleasant, according to the 2010 census, was 10,459, down from 11,794 in 2000.

	1990	2000	2010
white non-Hispanic	35%	35%	50%
black non-Hispanic	36%	27%	26%
Hispanic	26%	31%	25%
Asian	3.0%	6.3%	5.6%

Incomes rose during this time period.

	1979	1989	1999	2010
Average family income (2010 $)	$75,980	$77,704	$90,838	$130,790
Ratio to DC average	98%	83%	89%	114%

== Local institutions ==
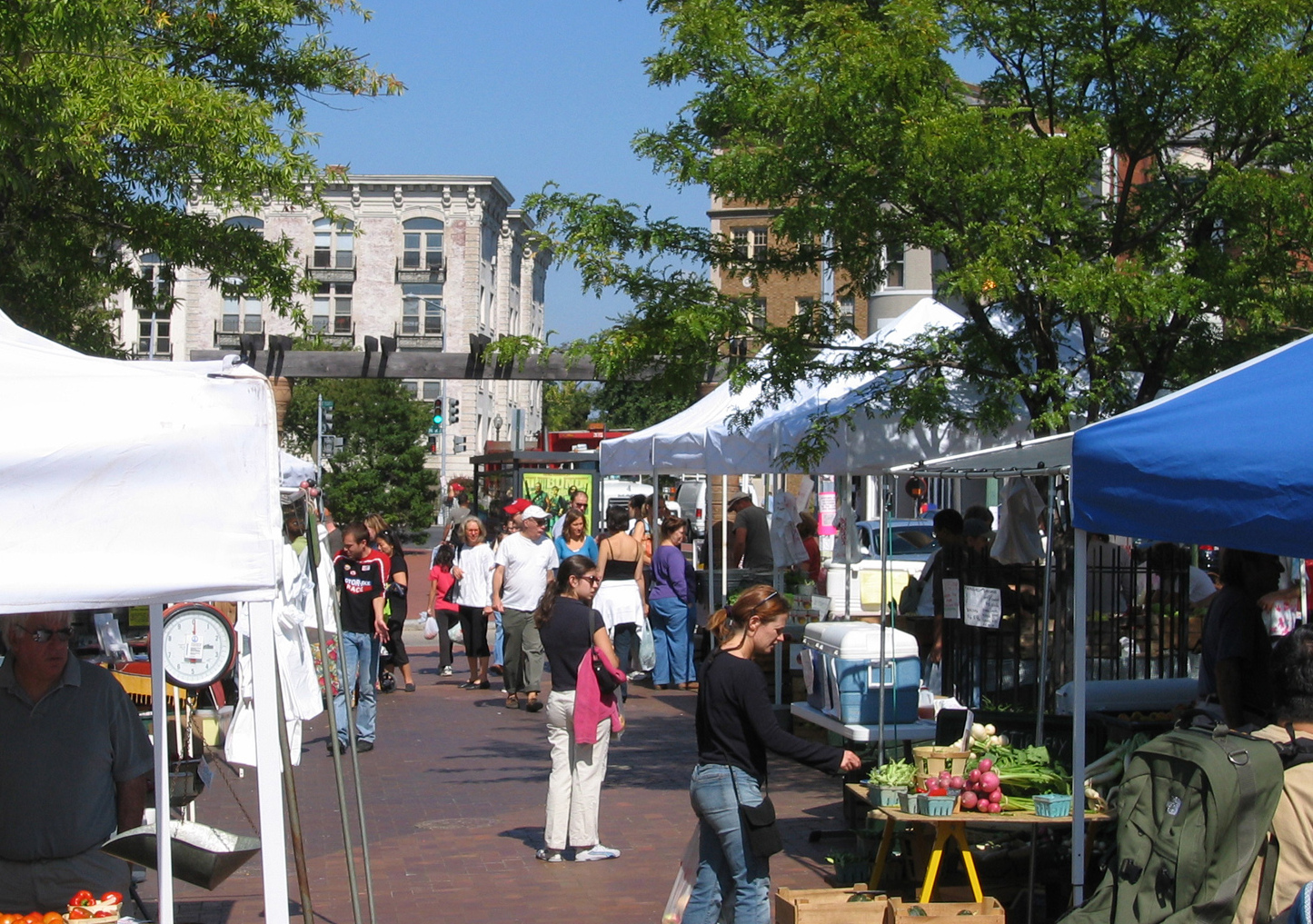
Mount Pleasant Farmer's Market is held every Saturday in Lamont Plaza.

The Mount Pleasant Historic District covers a variety of types and styles of building. The western portion of the neighborhood is a largely wooded residential enclave bounded on two sides by Rock Creek Park, just east of the National Zoo. Structures in this area are primarily row houses of Neoclassical architecture with front porches. The eastern side of the neighborhood, along 16th Street NW and Mount Pleasant Street, is marked by mid-rise apartment buildings.

The Eighteen Hundred Block Park Road, NW is notable for its 10 detached "suburban" houses on terraces overlooking the street.

The 12 buildings at 1644–1666 Park Road NW, designed by Appleton P. Clark Jr. in the style of Colonial Revival architecture, were completed in 1906.

The Guglielmo Marconi Memorial is located at Marconi Plaza.

== Education ==
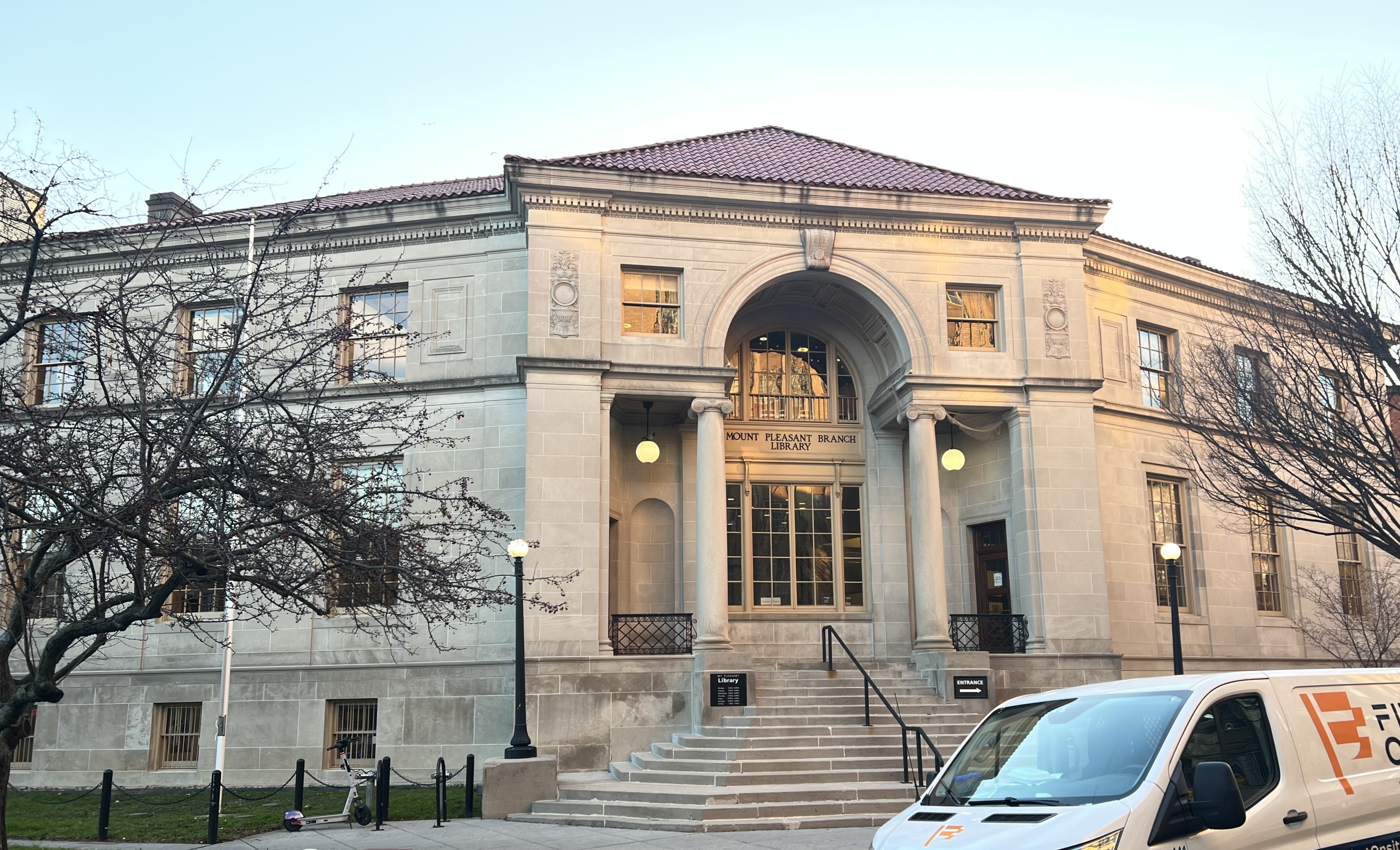
Mt. Pleasant Library, built in 1925 with funding from Andrew Carnegie.

- District of Columbia Public Schools operates the public schools.
  - Bancroft Elementary School, 1755 Newton Street NW
- Private Religious Schools.
  - Sacred Heart School, 1625 Park Road NW

District of Columbia Public Library operates the Mount Pleasant Library.

== Transportation ==
As of July 2025, Mount Pleasant is served by three Metrobus lines: Connecticut Avenue-Mount Pleasant (D72), Brookland-Tenleytown (C61), and during the school year, the Van Ness-Silver Spring (C87). Service by the Mount Pleasant Line (42, 43) and the Crosstown Line (H2, H4) was eliminated by WMATA's "Better Bus" initiative of 2025.

The closest Washington Metro station is in the adjacent Columbia Heights neighborhood.

There are two Capital Bikeshare stations.

== Notable people ==
Businesses on Mt. Pleasant Street

- Adrian Fenty, former mayor of Washington, D.C.
- Andrew Dana, restaurateur
- Helen Hayes, actress
- Walter Johnson, Washington Senators pitcher
- Sarah Doan La Fetra, temperance worker
- Suzanne La Follette, journalist and author
- Robert La Follette, politician
- Ian MacKaye, musician for Minor Threat and Fugazi
- Bob Mondello, film critic
