= Cresson (surname) =

Cresson is a surname. Notable people with the surname include:

- Elliott Cresson (1796 – 1854), American philanthropist
- Warder Cresson (1798 – 1860), later known as Michael Boaz Israel, American religious zealot and proto-Zionist
- Ezra Townsend Cresson (1838 – 1926), American entomologist
- William Penn Cresson (1873 – 1932)[1], American architect, author, diplomat and husband of sculptor Margaret French Cresson
- Ezra Townsend Cresson Jr. (1876–1948), American entomologist, see Ezra Townsend Cresson Jr. on Wikispecies
- Margaret French Cresson (1889–1973), American sculptor and wife of William Penn Cresson
- Myra Cresson (born 1904), social worker in Singapore
- Édith Cresson (born 1934), French politician
- Loris Cresson (born 1998), Belgian motorcycle racer
