= Georgetown Public Library =

Georgetown Public Library may refer to:

- George Town Public Library, Cayman Islands, located in George Town, Cayman Islands
- Georgetown Neighborhood Library, located in Washington, D.C., United States
- Georgetown Public Library, located in Georgetown, Texas
