= Planter's House Hotel =

Name used by 3 hotels in illinois

Coordinates: 38.626386°N 90.188593°W

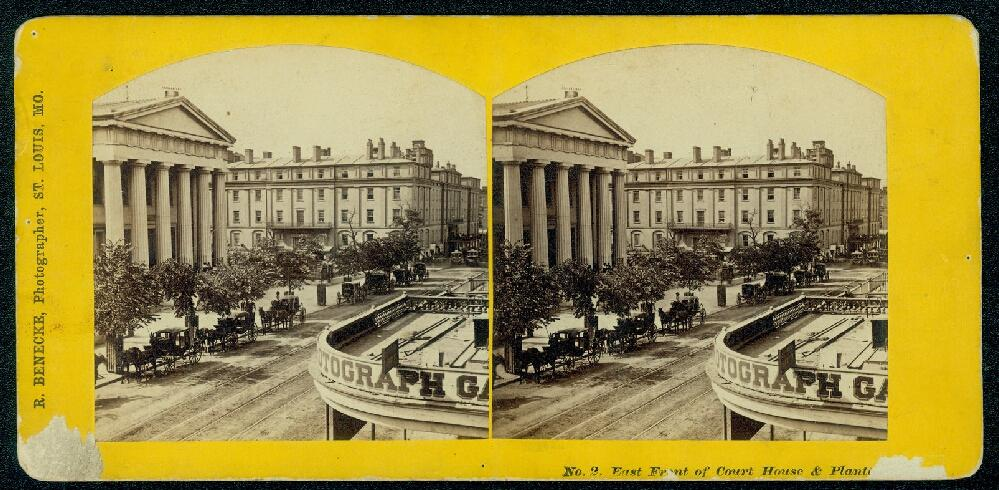
"East front of Court House and Planter's House." Stereograph by Robert Benecke, 1870.

The Planter's House Hotel was the name of three hotels in St. Louis, Missouri. The first operated from 1817, the second from 1841 to 1891, and the third until 1922.

== History ==
There were three incarnations of the Planter's House hotel in St. Louis, Missouri. The first opened in 1817 on Second Street and was replaced with a larger hotel in 1841. The first hotel was located on Second Street and was opened by Evarist Maury. Maury had intentions of expanding the hotel, but instead another Planter's House was erected on Fourth Street bounded by Chestnut and Pine. In 1836, a group of prominent St. Louisans gathered to discuss building the grandest and largest hotel in the city. Judge J.B.C. Lucas presided over the meeting, with Bernard Pratte serving as secretary. A committee was formed to find a site for the hotel and to determine shareholders. The committee included Messrs. McGunnegle, Morton, Kerr, and Brant. The site on Fourth Street, which was then owned by Judge Lucas, was decided to be the best location. On December 6, 1836, the shareholders met and elected directors for the company. The directors included Alexander R. Simpson, D.D. Page, D. Lamont, J.C. Laveille, E. Tracy, J. Charles, and G.W. Call. After applying to the Legislature in 1836-37, the company obtained a charter with capital of $1,000. Groundbreaking for the hotel occurred in March 1837, but work was not completed until 1841.

Planter's House Hotel was four stories tall and had 300 rooms. The hotel was decorated with rich carpets and paintings and the cutlery was made to order in England, with the hotels' initials engraved on each piece. Planter's Punch was invented at the hotel bar. The hotel also contained two dining rooms. Planter's House was nearly called The Lucas House, after its patron Judge Lucas, but the proprietors decided to stick with the original name and the hotel began operations in April 1841. The hotel became a popular gathering place for politicians and businessmen. A room cost $4.25 per person and included four meals. One of the lessees of the hotel, Benjamin Stickney, was a prominent St. Louisan and later served as director for St. Louis Gaslight Company, the Missouri Pacific Railroad, and the St. Louis National Bank. Stickney died on November 14, 1876. After his death, the hotel was reopened by J. Fogg & Co.

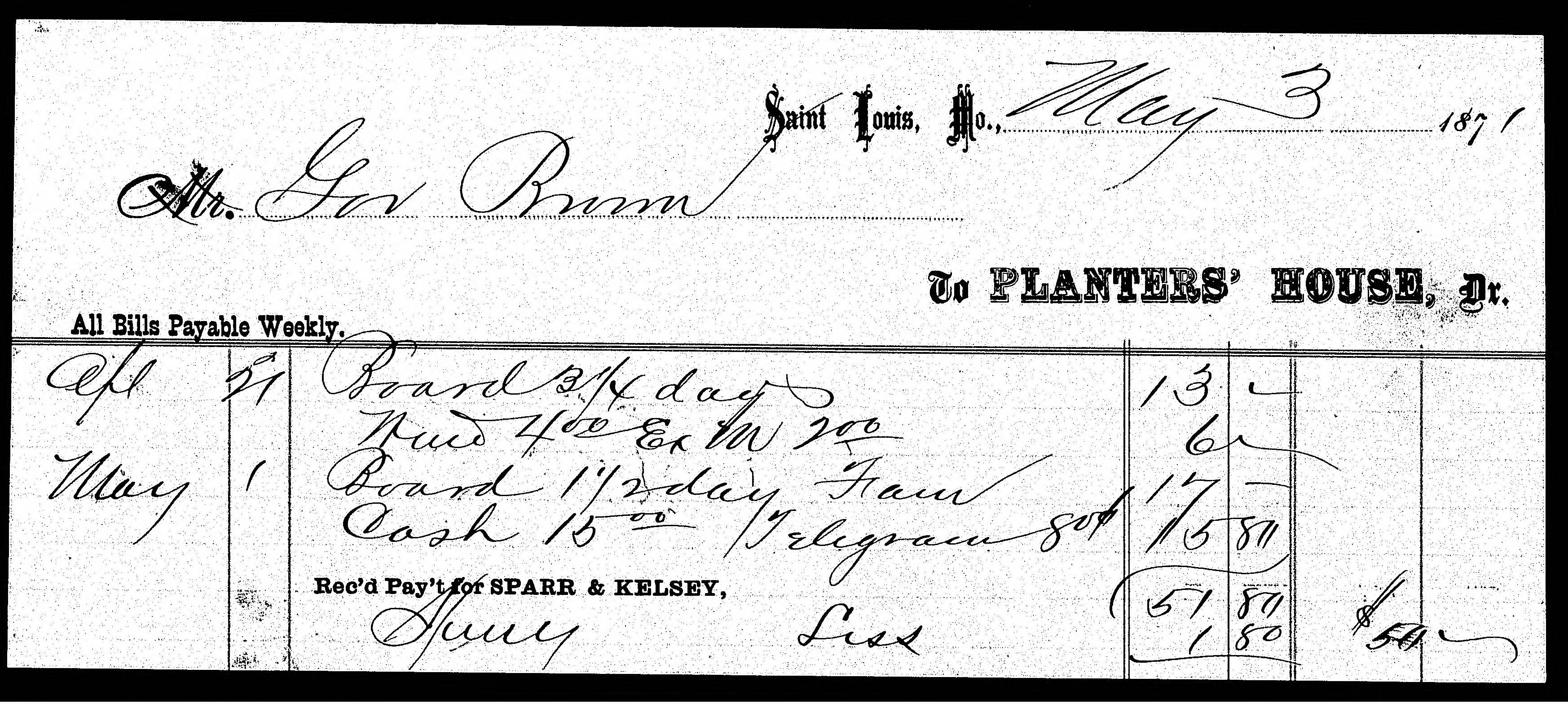
Governor's Mansion: Planter's House, St. Louis, hotel bill incurred by Governor Brown, courtesy of the Missouri State Archives

The second incarnation of the Planter's House Hotel hosted many prominent guests. Some notable residents of the hotel were Jefferson Davis, Abraham Lincoln, Andrew Jackson, U.S. Grant, and William F. Cody. Charles Dickens also stayed at the hotel and wrote favorably about it. Dickens devoted several pages of American Notes to St. Louis. He was impressed with many buildings in the city, including Planter's House, of which he wrote, "It is an excellent house, and the proprietors have most bountiful notions of providing the creature comforts." In March 1847, Henry Clay visited St. Louis and stayed at the Planter's House. A soiree was also given there in his honor.

A meeting that ultimately kept Missouri in the Union during the Civil War occurred at the Planter's House Hotel on June 11, 1861. Gov. Claiborne Jackson and Gen. Sterling Price, representing secession, met with Col. Nathaniel Lyon and Frank Blair. Lyon rejected a proposal to partition the state, resulting in a series of battles in Missouri at Boonville, Lexington, Carthage, and finally Wilson Creek, near Springfield. Governor Benjamin Gratz Brown stayed there on May 3, 1871 (see image of hotel bill).

In 1882, the Planter's House's proprietors were listed as J&J Gerardi and the assessed value of the property was $15,440.

The second hotel was damaged by fire in 1887 and torn down in 1891.

A new, grander, Planter's House Hotel was to be built to replace the fire-damaged building. Financing for the hotel was made possible when St. Louis was passed over to host the Columbian Exposition. Civic leaders in St. Louis had secured pledges of five million dollars, plus one million for entertainment at the fair. After the city lost the bid for the fair, the group offered a one-million-dollar bonus to the organization or individual who would build a first-class, fireproof hotel in St. Louis. Investors in the project chose a site at Fourth and Pine Street and hired Isaac Taylor to design the hotel. The new Planter's House Hotel had 400 rooms, an elegant main restaurant, a ladies' dining room, and various meeting and banquet rooms. Planter's Punch was invented at a previous incarnation of the hotel and at the third hotel bar, the Tom Collins was created by bartender Charles Dietrich. The lime, lemon, and gin drink was named after a regular and favored customer.

On December 9, 1920, Sarah Elizabeth Mitchell Guernsey founded the National Society Daughters of the American Colonists at the hotel. The third Planter's House Hotel closed in 1922 and was later converted to an office building. The third hotel was the last, and was demolished in 1976 and replaced with Boatmen's Tower, which later became the Bank of America Building.

== Notable people ==
- Marie Moentmann (1901–1974), child survivor of industrial accident, recipient of benefit in 1915
