= Nathan C. Wyeth =

American architect (1870–1963)

Nathan Corwith Wyeth
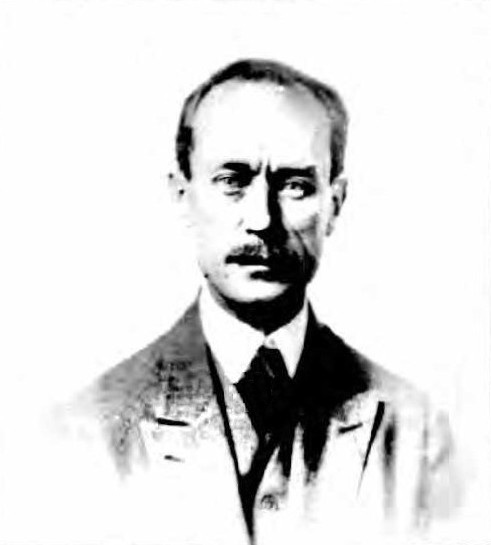
- Wyeth in 1922
- Born: April 20, 1870; Chicago, Illinois, U.S.
- Died: August 30, 1963 (aged 93); Washington, D.C., U.S.
- Occupation: Architect
- Known for: Designer of the Oval Office and West Wing; designer of the Cannon, Russell, and Longworth Congressional buildings; designer of the USS Maine Mast Memorial

Nathan Corwith Wyeth (April 20, 1870 – August 30, 1963) was an American architect. He is best known for designing the West Wing of the White House, creating the first Oval Office. He designed a large number of structures in Washington, D.C., including the Francis Scott Key Bridge over the Potomac River, the USS Maine Mast Memorial, the D.C. Armory, the Tidal Basin Inlet Bridge, many structures that comprise Judiciary Square, and numerous private homes—many of which now serve as embassies. He also co-designed the Cannon House Office Building, the Russell Senate Office Building, the Longworth House Office Building, and an addition to the Russell Senate Office Building.

== Early life and education ==
Nathan Corwith Wyeth was born on April 20, 1870, in Chicago, Illinois, to Charles Jones and Julia Elizabeth (née MacReynolds) Wyeth. Wyeth was of English stock on his father's side. His ancestor, Nicholas Wyeth, emigrated to the United States from Saxtead in about 1640, and settled in Cambridge, Massachusetts. In 1832, Wyeth's grandfather, Dr. Jacob Wyeth, accompanied his brother Nathaniel Jarvis Wyeth, part of the way to the then-wilderness of Oregon. On his return trip, he decided to move the family to Galena, Illinois. Through his father, Nathan Wyeth was a fourth cousin to the painter Newell Convers "N.C." Wyeth, and the painter Andrew Wyeth was his fourth cousin once removed.

Nathan's father, Charles, was the wealthy co-owner of Wyeth and Vandervoort, a company that sold malt for use by brewers of alcoholic beverages. He was also a member of the Chicago Board of Trade. Nathan was just a year old when his parents carried him to safety out of the city when the Great Chicago Fire struck in October 1871.

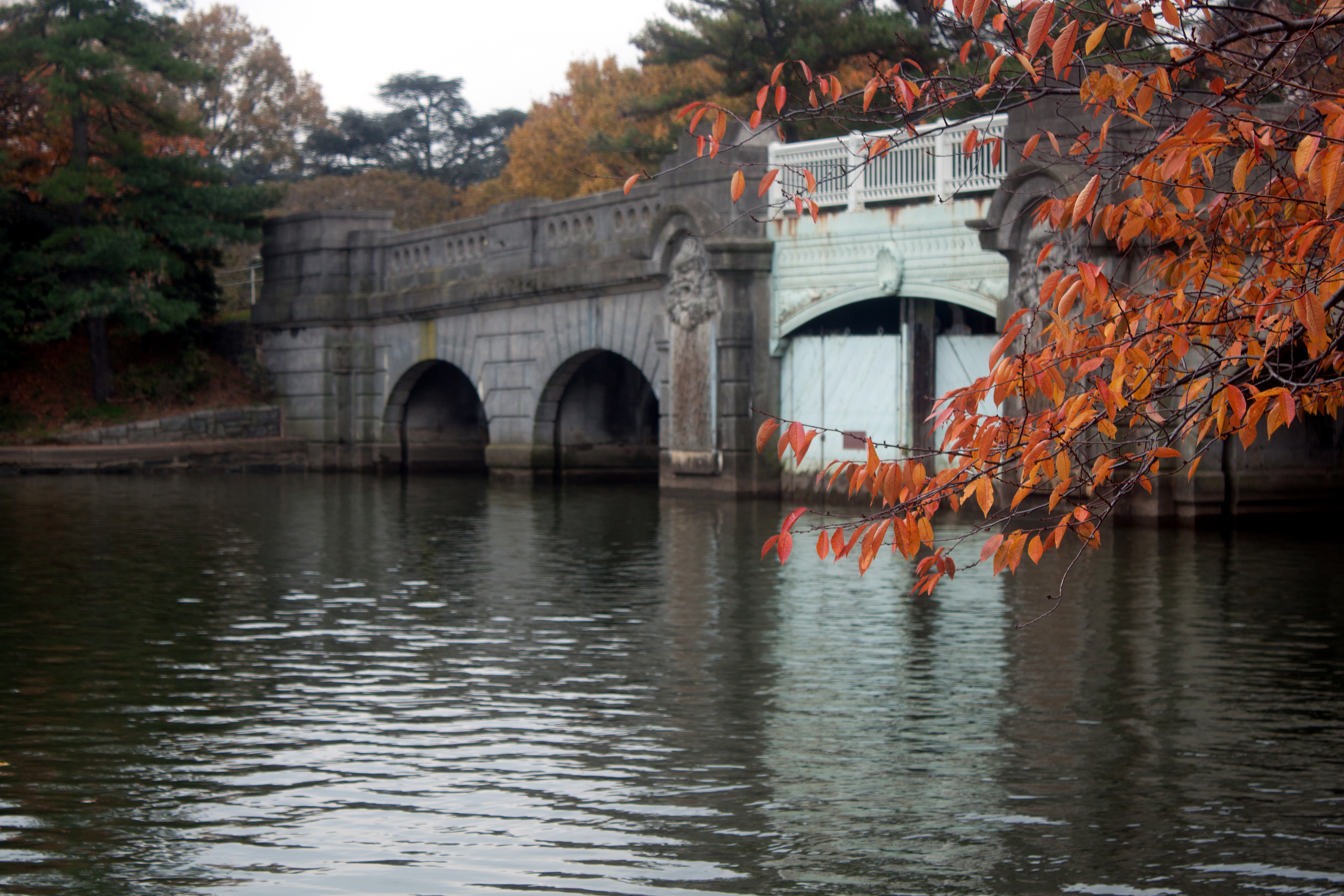
The Tidal Basin Inlet Bridge with inlet gates (in white), one of Wyeth's earliest important commissions

Charles Wyeth died in 1873 when Nathan was three years old. His will left $100,000 ($2,687,500 in 2025 dollars) in trust for his wife and sons Nathan and Leonard. In 1881, Julia Wyeth married General Orlando B. Willcox, a lawyer who rose to the rank of Brevet Major General of Volunteers during the American Civil War and served as a colonel in the 29th Infantry Regiment after the war. (Note: Willcox received the Medal of Honor for his actions during the First Battle of Bull Run in 1861.) Willcox later transferred to the 12th Infantry Regiment, and moved to San Francisco, California, to take up his command. He was appointed Commander of the Department of Arizona in 1878, and in 1886 was made head of the Department of the Missouri. He retired on April 16, 1887, at the rank of brigadier general in the regular army, after which he became governor of the Soldiers' Home in Washington, D.C., on February 27, 1889. But Nathan did not travel with his stepfather. Instead, he attended a series of boarding schools: Racine College (an Episcopal preparatory school in Racine, Wisconsin), the Harrington School (a preparatory school in New Bedford, Massachusetts), and Adams Collegiate Institute (a preparatory school in Sackets Harbor, New York).

In 1888, N. Corwith and Company—the firm which held the Wyeth funds in trust—went bankrupt. The firm had commingled the Wyeth trust funds with those of its other businesses, and the bankruptcy wiped out the trust as well. The Wyeths sued, and the Supreme Court of Illinois held in their favor in 1888. Although it is unclear if the Wyeths recovered much money, enough was received to pay for Nathan and Leonard's secondary and higher education.

Nathan was 18 years old in 1888. Despite the financial setbacks of his trust fund, he began his post-secondary education by studying watercolor painting in Belgium and Switzerland. Wyeth returned to the United States in the summer of 1889 and studied at the Metropolitan Museum of Art in New York City. He was awarded a first prize for his work, and graduated first in his class. (Note: One source, The National Cyclopaedia of American Biography, claims he attended the Michigan Military Academy in Orchard Lake Village, Michigan (near Detroit, where his stepfather had once practiced law). Architectural historians Sue A. Kohler and Jeffrey R. Carson claim he attended both.) In summer 1890, he enrolled as an art student at the École nationale supérieure des Beaux-Arts in Paris, France. He studied under Duray Pascal, switched his major to architecture, and received his Architect Diplômé par le Gouvernement from the school in 1899.

Wyeth's first notable architectural design can be traced to 1891, while he was still studying in France. This effort was a fourth-floor addition to the Lemon Building at 1729 New York Avenue NW in Washington, D.C. It was an important commission, for the building was the headquarters of the American Institute of Architects. (The structure was razed in 1971.)

== Early work ==
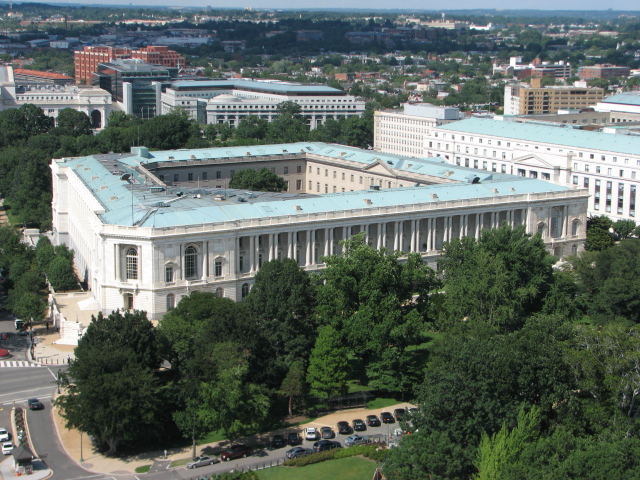
The Russell Senate Office Building, which Wyeth co-designed in 1903 and to which he designed the 1933 addition.

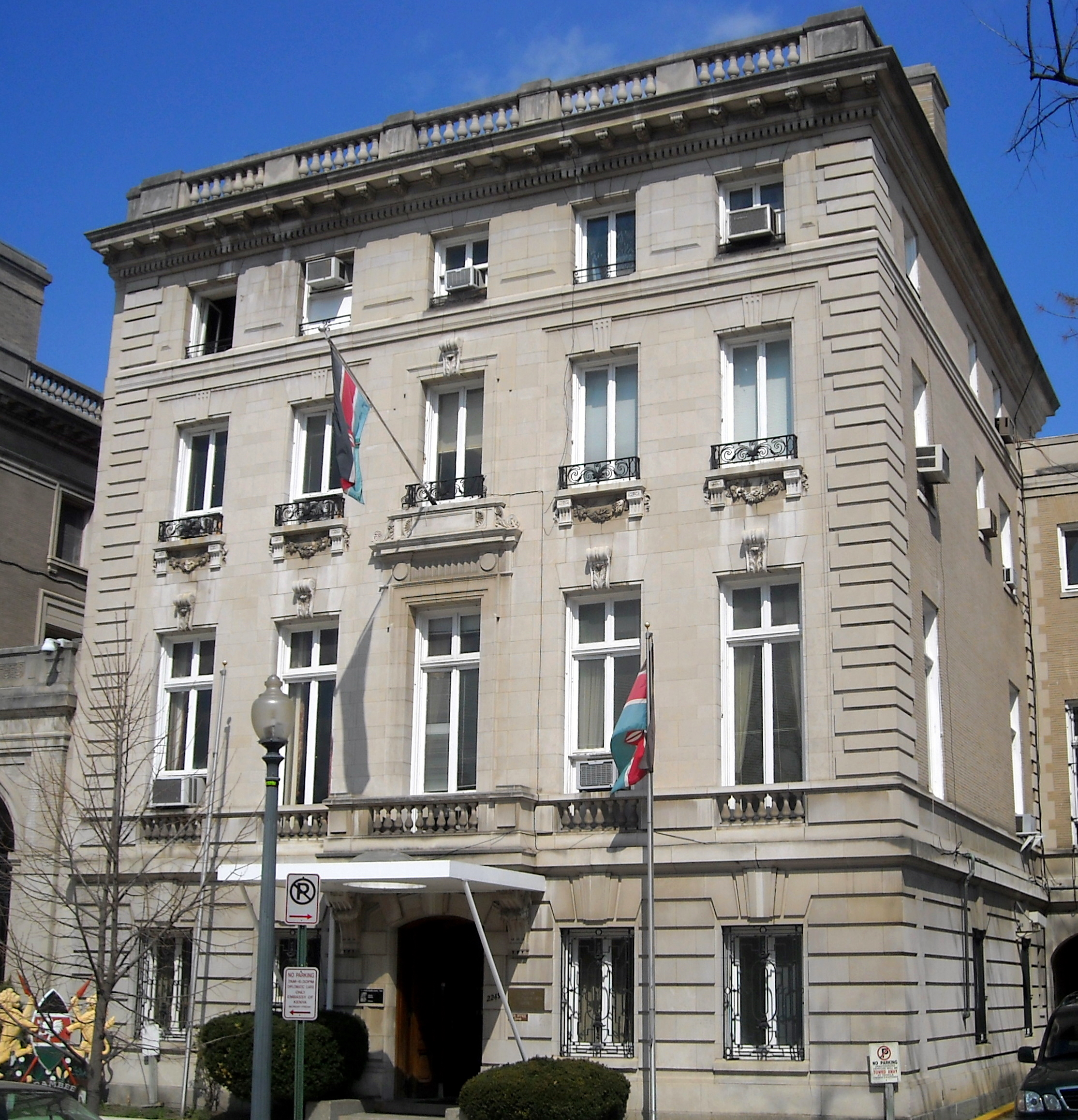
The F.A. Keep/C.R. Peyton House (now the Embassy of Kenya), designed by Wyeth in 1906 and 1908.

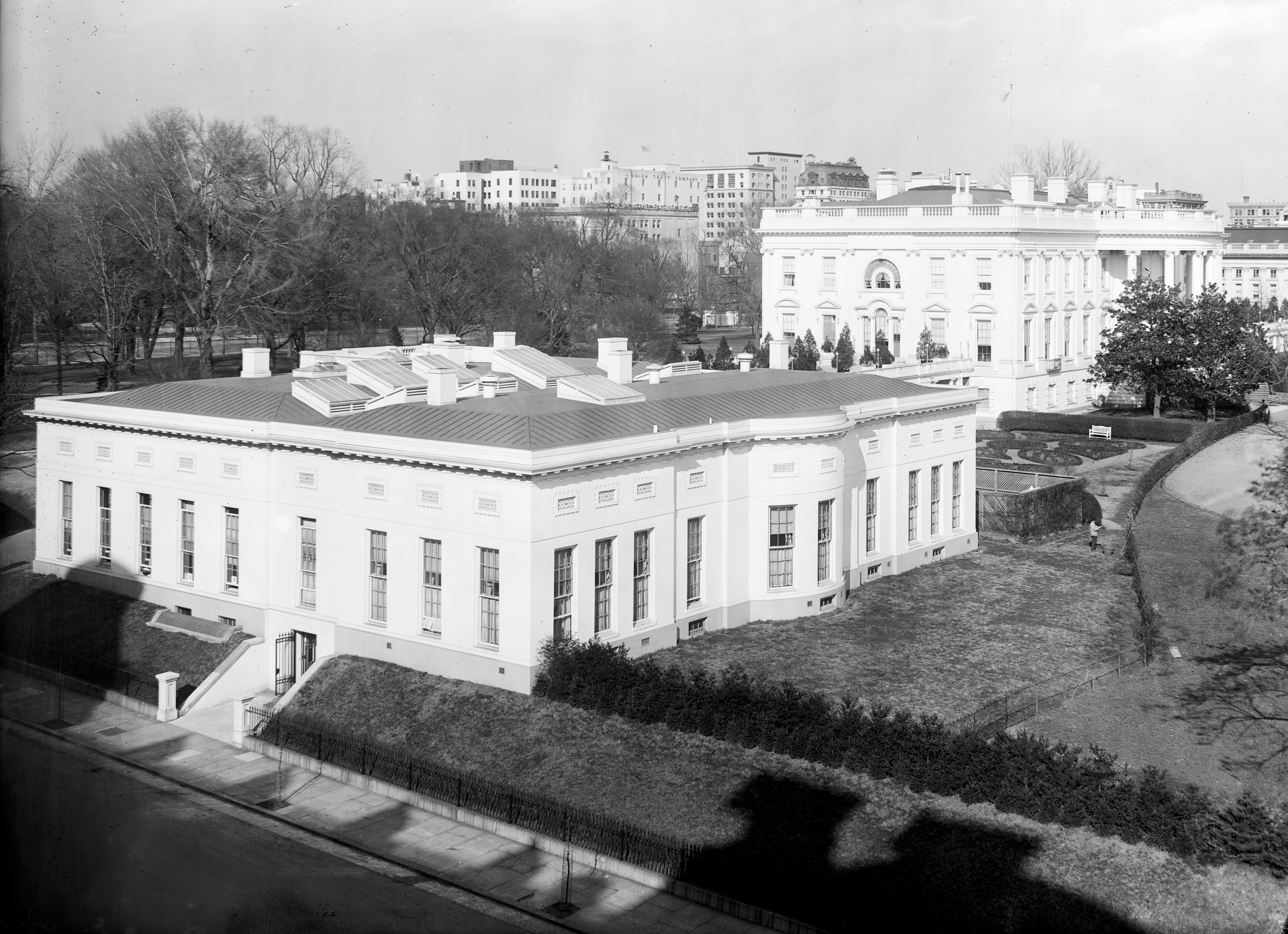
The West Wing of the White House, which Wyeth designed in 1909. The round walls of the Oval Office protrude from the structure.

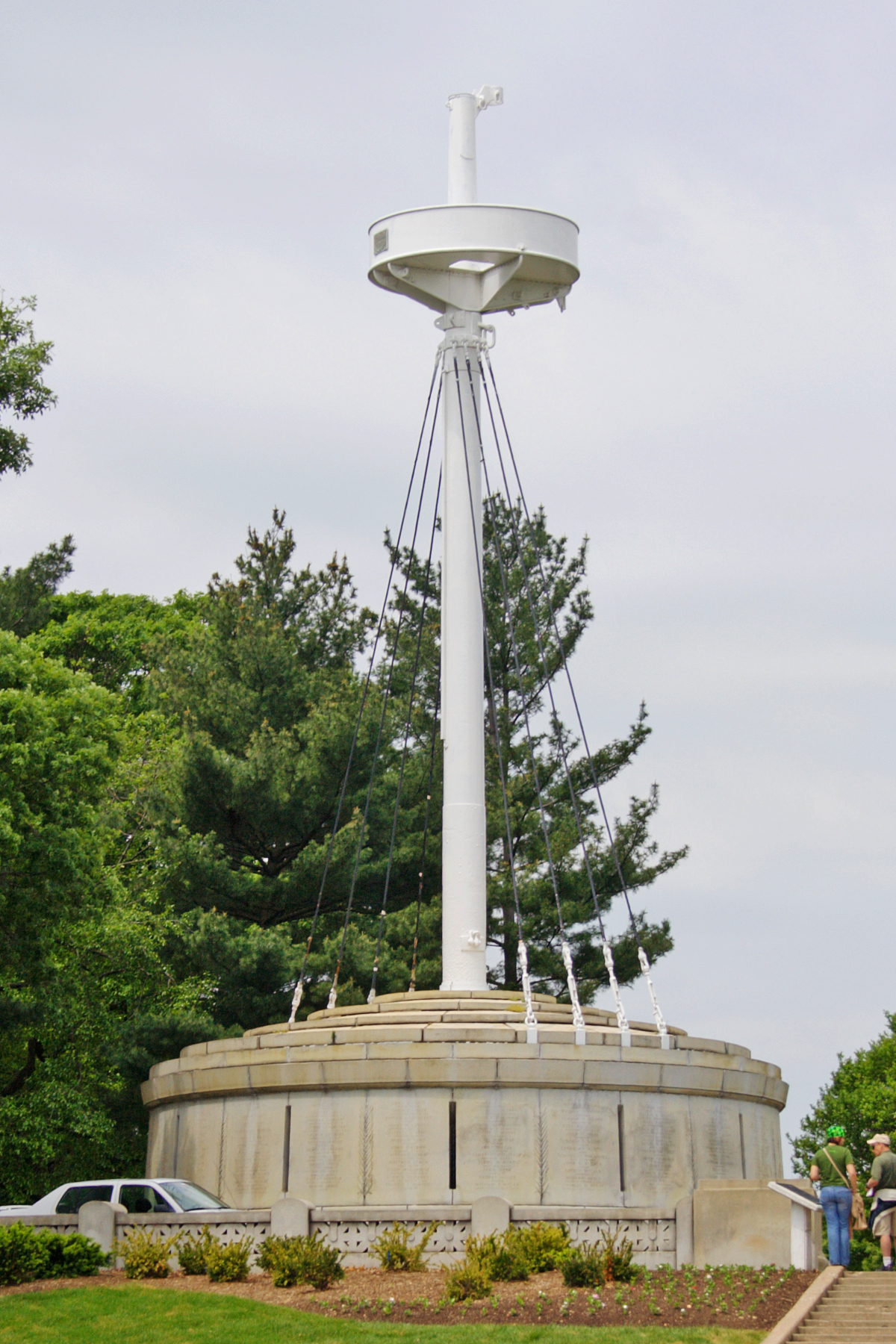
The USS Maine Mast Memorial, designed by Wyeth in 1913.

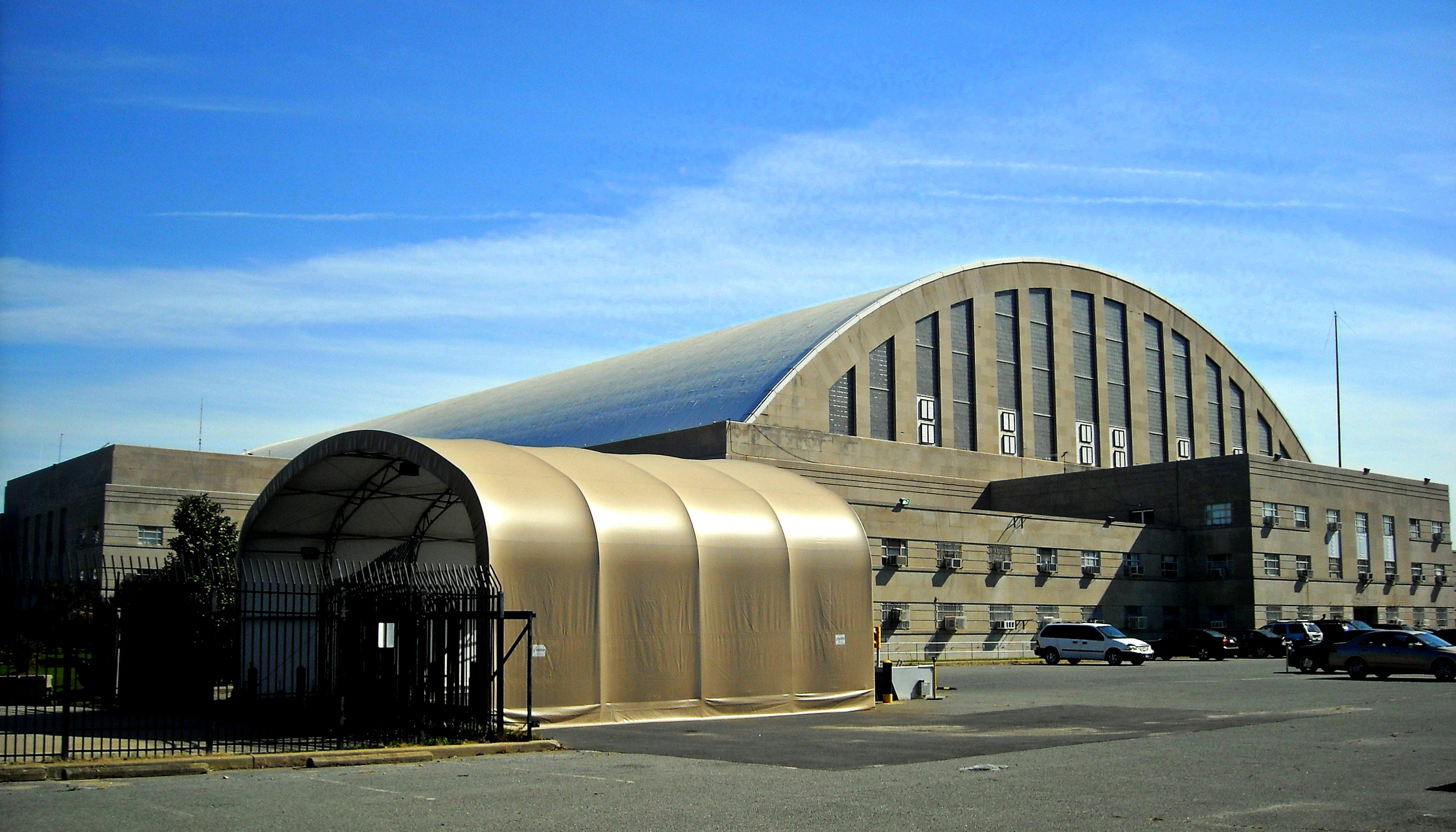
The D.C. Armory, designed by Wyeth and completed in 1941.

After graduating from the École nationale supérieure des Beaux-Arts, Wyeth took a job with Carrère and Hastings, a New York City-based company that was one of the most prominent architectural firms in the United States. He left the firm in 1900 and moved to Washington, D.C., where he took a position at the Office of the Supervising Architect in the United States Department of the Treasury (the government agency which, at the time, designed all federal office buildings). (Note: Kohler and Carson note that Wyeth took a temporary position with the Office of the Supervising Architect in December 1899, but that it did not become permanent until October 1900.) After two and a half years there, he transferred to the office of the Architect of the Capitol, working under Elliott Woods. Although he worked there just eight months, there is evidence that he helped design both the Cannon House Office Building and the Russell Senate Office Building.

=== Private practice ===
Wyeth left government employment to form his own private architectural practice in 1904. During the next 14 years, he designed a large number of residences, office and retail buildings, and local government offices. In 1907, he briefly formed the firm of Wyeth & Cresson with noted local architect William Penn Cresson (husband of sculptor Margaret French Cresson). But the association lasted only a year.

One of Wyeth's most prominent early commission was the Tidal Basin Inlet Bridge connecting East Potomac Park and West Potomac Park. Both parks were formerly part of the waters of the Potomac River. Beginning in 1881, material dredged from the river was placed in the tidal flats west and south of the city, creating the western half of the National Mall, the Washington Channel, and the Tidal Basin. The Tidal Basin was designed so that fresh water would flow in via its southern strait, and then flush outward into the Washington Channel. In 1907, the United States Army Corps of Engineers decided that gates were needed at the southern inlet to prevent the basin's water from backflowing into the Potomac (thus ensuring a flush into the channel). The Corps decided that a bridge should be built along with the gates, so that the roadway around the Tidal Basin would make a complete circuit. Wyeth was the only architect considered for the bridge job. His employment was approved in early February 1908, and by early April he'd completed the bridge plans. Although his design for a two-tier bridge was only partially implemented (the top tier was removed for budget reasons), work on the bridge was largely complete by June 1909.

Among the many notable private residences Wyeth built during this first phase of his private practice were the Nathan C. and Isabelle Wells House at 1609 Connecticut Avenue NW in 1904; the new front facade and rear addition to the Dr. J. H. Bryan House at 818 17th Street NW in 1904; the Dr. Bernard L. Hardin House at 1313 Connecticut Avenue NW in 1905; the Anna Jenness Miller House at 2205 Massachusetts Avenue NW in 1905; the John R. McLean House at 1509 H Street NW in 1905; the F.A. Keep House (built 1906) and the C. Russell Peyton House (built 1908), both at 2249 R Street NW (formerly the Embassy of Sweden, now the Embassy of Kenya); with William P. Cresson, the Louis Arthur Coolidge House (now the Embassy of Zambia) at 2419 Massachusetts Avenue NW in 1907; the Mrs. Norman Williams House at 1227 16th Street NW in 1907; the Mrs. John McGowan House at 1424 16th Street NW in 1907; the Helen Churchill Candee House at 1149 16th Street NW in 1909; the Sara S. Wyeth House (now the Chilean ambassador's resident in Washington, D.C.) at 2305 Massachusetts Avenue NW in 1909; (Note: Sara Wyeth was Nathan Wyeth's cousin.) the Gibson Fhanestock House (now the Embassy and Chancery of Haiti) at 2311 Massachusetts Avenue NW in 1910; with Francis P. Sullivan, the Mrs. George Pullman House (now the Russian ambassador's residence) at 1125 16th Street NW in 1910; the Granville Fortescue House (now the Embassy of Malawi) at 2408 Massachusetts Avenue NW in 1911; the Franklin MacVeagh House (formerly the Embassy of Mexico and now the Mexican Cultural Institute) at 2829 16th Street NW in 1911; the Misses Nellie and Isabelle Sedgeley House at 2406 Massachusetts Avenue NW in 1911; the Dr. William H. Wilmer House at 2101 R Street NW in 1912; and the Charles C. Glover House at 4200 Massachusetts Avenue NW in 1913.

One of Wyeth's largest commissions in this period came in 1913, when he designed a new building for the Columbia Hospital for Women at 2425 L Street NW.

=== Government commissions ===
An avid socialite, Wyeth's short time working for the federal government had won him a wide range of important friends. These led to a number of important commissions between 1904 and 1918. In 1909, he entered and won a competition to redesign the West Wing of the White House, turning a temporary structure into a permanent office complex. The Lemon Building addition had helped him win the commission, Wyeth's design for the West Wing, construction on which ended in October 1909, was a one-story structure which included the first and original Oval Office—which mimicked the Blue Room and Yellow Oval Room in the Executive Residence. (The Oval Office was moved in 1934 from the center of the south wall of the West Wing to the southeast corner of the building.)

The following year, Wyeth oversaw the remodeling of the British Embassy in the District of Columbia. He was appointed "local architect" of the embassy in 1909, and held the position until 1919.

Wyeth was hired to design the USS Maine Mast Memorial at Arlington National Cemetery in May 1913. Congress had approved a memorial in 1910, but little progress had been made. The United States Commission of Fine Arts (CFA), which had legal authority to advise regarding the siting and design of monuments and memorials, had reviewed preliminary designs submitted by the Army Corps of Engineers and had declined to approve any of them. Privately, the CFA voiced its opinion that the designs submitted were very poor. The commission advised the War Department to select a designer rather than hold a competition, and recommended Wyeth. The Secretary of War agreed, and Wyeth was hired in May 1913 to submit a design.

== World War I and post-war work ==
=== War work: 1917 to 1919 ===
On October 17, 1917, Wyeth was hired by the United States Army Corps of Engineers to co-design the newly approved Francis Scott Key Bridge. Wyeth worked with Major Max C. Tyler, an engineer with the Corps of Engineers, to design the bridge, which crossed the Potomac River between the Rosslyn neighborhood of Arlington County, Virginia, and the Georgetown neighborhood of Washington, D.C. The bridge was completed in 1923.

When the United States entered World War I in April 1918, Wyeth sought to join the military. He loved France, and was deeply upset at reports of the destruction and loss of life there. Too old at age 47 to be conscripted, he sought an architectural job with the Army as a way of helping the French people. Wyeth was released from his bridge contract with the Army Corps of Engineers in 1918 so he could be commissioned as a major in the United States Army. For the duration of the war, he worked for the Hospital Division of the Office of the Surgeon General, designing temporary hospitals for construction in France.

The war ended in November 1919. But Wyeth fell seriously ill after the war and moved to Switzerland to recover his health. He spent his time overseas painting watercolors, some of which were good enough to be exhibited at the Corcoran Gallery of Art. His works were also hung in the Missouri State Capitol. He did not return permanently to Washington until 1925.

=== Post-war work ===
After his return to the District of Columbia, Wyeth reopened his private practice.

The post-war era was a difficult one for Wyeth. In 1924 or 1930 (sources vary), he formed an architectural firm with Francis P. Sullivan. Wyeth was appointed in 1925 to a group of architects which advised the District of Columbia Public Schools on the design of school buildings, and which provided design services to the school district. But his commissions from the city never materialized. In 1925, Wyeth joined many of the city's top architects in forming Allied Architects of Washington, D.C., Inc. Teams within this federation of architectural firms worked on some of the most important commissions in the city, and Wyeth joined Frank Upman, Gilbert LaCoste Rodier, and Louis Justement in co-designing the Longworth House Office Building. (Note: Allied Architects folded in 1949.) Commissions for major residences were much rarer now. Wyeth finished six significant works: The Judge Edwin B. Parker House at 2001 24th Street NW in 1926 (later the Embassy of Afghanistan); the Justice Harlan Fiske Stone House at 2340 Wyoming Street NW in 1926; the Clarence A. Aspinwall House at 2340 Kalorama Street NW in 1928; the Duncan Phillips House at 2101 Foxhall Road NW in 1929; the Mrs. Wilber E. Wilder House (now the Embassy of Venezuela at 1099 30th Street NW in 1929 and the Frederick Atherton House (now the Embassy of Ivory Coast) at 2424 Massachusetts Avenue NW in 1930. All were co-designed with Francis P. Sullivan. Again with Sullivan, Wyeth co-designed the First Street Wing addition to the Russell Senate Office Building in 1933.

One of Wyeth's few major commissions during this period was a group of homes on Whitehaven Street NW, near the British Embassy in Washington, D.C. (then under construction). A group of notable Washingtonians—including Senator Frederick H. Gillett, Colonel Reginald S. Huidekoper, and Commander Paul Bastedo—asked Wyeth to design large houses, all in the Georgian style, to occupy this block. (Architect Frederick H. Brooke also built a Georgian home here, but designed it himself.) The block already contained the McCormick House, a 1908 mansion designed by John Russell Pope for diplomat Robert Sanderson McCormick. (Note: 3055 Whitehaven Street NW was built for the Bastedos. It was sold by 1941 to Colonel Kemper Williams, and by 1944 to Arthur Gardner. By 1949 it was owned by prominent D.C. real estate developer and construction company owner Charles Hook Tompkins. The house was sold at some point to Leland Harrison, and in February 1953 it was purchased by Gerard Barnes Lambert, president of the Gillette Safety Razor Company and co-founder of the Warner–Lambert pharmaceutical company. Some time around 1957, the Lamberts transferred ownership of the house to their daughter, Rachel Lambert Mellon. Paul and Rachel Mellon used the home to display their vast collection of artwork. The property was purchased from the Mellons in 2001 by Republican campaign advisor Wayne L. Berman for $4,836,000 ($8,793,140 in 2025 dollars). The 13,000-square-foot (1,200 m^{2}), eight-bedroom, seven-bath house went on the market in 2012 with an asking price of $20 million ($28,047,543.)

With the start of the Great Depression in the United States in the fall of 1929, Wyeth received far fewer architectural commissions. The firm of Wyeth & Sullivan declared bankruptcy that year. (Note: While Kohler, Carson, and Jennings claim the firm collapsed after "six years", Kohler and Carson say it folded in 1934. The 1934 date seems unlikely, as this means the firm would have opened in 1928. The firm was clearly already receiving commissions, however, by 1924.) Wyeth tried to rebuild his practice, but the depression left him without clients. In deep financial difficulty, he took a temporary position as the Municipal Architect of the District of Columbia in 1933. His appointment was made permanent on January 12, 1934. He remained in the position until his retirement at age 77 in 1946.

As Municipal Architect, Wyeth designed and won approval of a master plan for Judiciary Square in 1934. He subsequently designed four buildings which helped to complete this master plan. The first of these, the D.C. Police Court Building, was located on the west side of 5th Street NW, and ran from E Street NW about three-quarters of the way to D Street NW. This structure began construction in September 1936 and was finished in April 1937. (This structure was razed in the mid-1960s.) The second structure was the D.C. Municipal Building (also known as the East Administration Building) at 300 Indiana Avenue NW. Construction started on December 10, 1938, and it was finished in May 1941. To complement the D.C. Police Court Building, Wyeth designed a third structure—the D.C. Municipal Court Building, which occupied the east side of 4th Street NW between E and D Streets NW. It was completed in late 1941. (This structure was razed as well, and the site is now occupied by One Judiciary Square.) The northwest corner of the square itself had long been occupied by a small, Neoclassical structure housing the District of Columbia Court of Appeals. To balance this structure aesthetically, Wyeth designed a new fourth structure, the D.C. Juvenile Court Building at 410 E Street NW. It was completed in 1940. A fifth structure, the Recorder of Deeds Building, was built at 515 D Street NW immediately to the south of the D.C. Police Court Building. It opened in September 1941.

Wyeth also personally designed the D.C. Armory (also known as the National Guard Armory) at 2001 East Capitol Street SE, which was completed in July 1941. He also personally designed the Georgetown Neighborhood Library (finished in 1935) and the Petworth Neighborhood Library (finished in 1939) of the District of Columbia Public Library. Although a number of city schools were constructed while Wyeth was Municipal Architect, only two—Kelly Miller Junior High School (completed in 1949, razed in 2001) and Coolidge Senior High School—can be directly attributed to him.

== Private life ==
Wyeth married Dorothy Ellis Lawson (November 1, 1891 – September 1975) of Cincinnati, Ohio, on September 20, 1911. Lawson was the cousin of Laura Lawson Blair, wife of Gist Blair. The Blairs were still the owners of Blair House, now a part of the White House Complex but then a private residence across the street from the White House. Dorothy was just 19 years old at the time, and Nathan Wyeth was 22 years her senior. The couple bonded over their mutual love of France. The couple had two children: Margo Julia (born in August 1912) and Stuart MacReynolds (born July 1914).

Wyeth was described as nervous, and correct to the point of rudeness. He was an avid watercolorist, figure skater, and hiker.

Wyeth was a member of the American Federation of Art, the American Legion, the American Planning and Civic Association, the Military Order of the World War, the Society of Beaux-Arts Architects, the Society for the Preservation of New England Antiquities, and the Washington Society of Fine Arts. He was also a member of the Alpine Club, Chevy Chase Club, Cosmos Club, and the Metropolitan Club.

== Death ==
Nathan C. Wyeth died at his home in Washington, D.C., of natural causes on August 30, 1963. He was survived by his wife, Dorothy, and his children Margo and Stuart. He was interred in the Wyeth family plot at Mount Auburn Cemetery near Cambridge, Massachusetts.

Writing 15 years after his death, architectural historians Sue A. Kohler and Jeffrey R. Carson concluded "...Wyeth was one of the more gifted architects practicing in Washington during the early years of this century."

== Awards and paintings ==
Wyeth was named a Fellow of the American Institute of Architects in 1914. He was elected the second vice president of the D.C. chapter of the American Institute of Architects in 1928. Wyeth designed his own home at 2915 44th Street NW in 1935, and lived in the structure for the rest of his life. The home was given an award for meritorious design by the Greater Washington Board of Trade in March 1936.

In addition to several exhibitions of his watercolors, Wyeth also illustrated George H. Palmer's 1930 translation of The Odyssey.

== Notable works ==
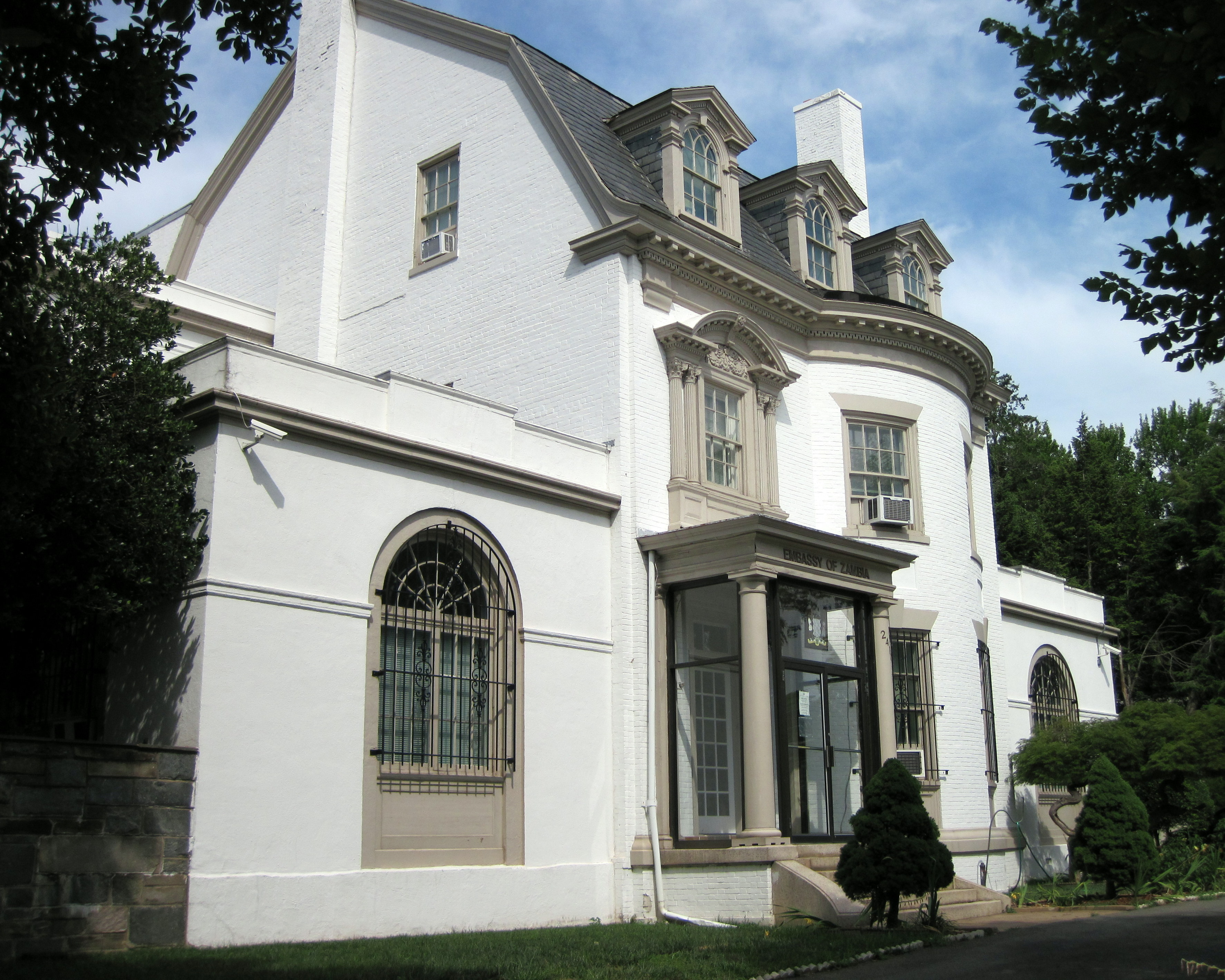
Embassy of Zambia at 2419 Massachusetts Avenue NW, designed by Wyeth in 1907.

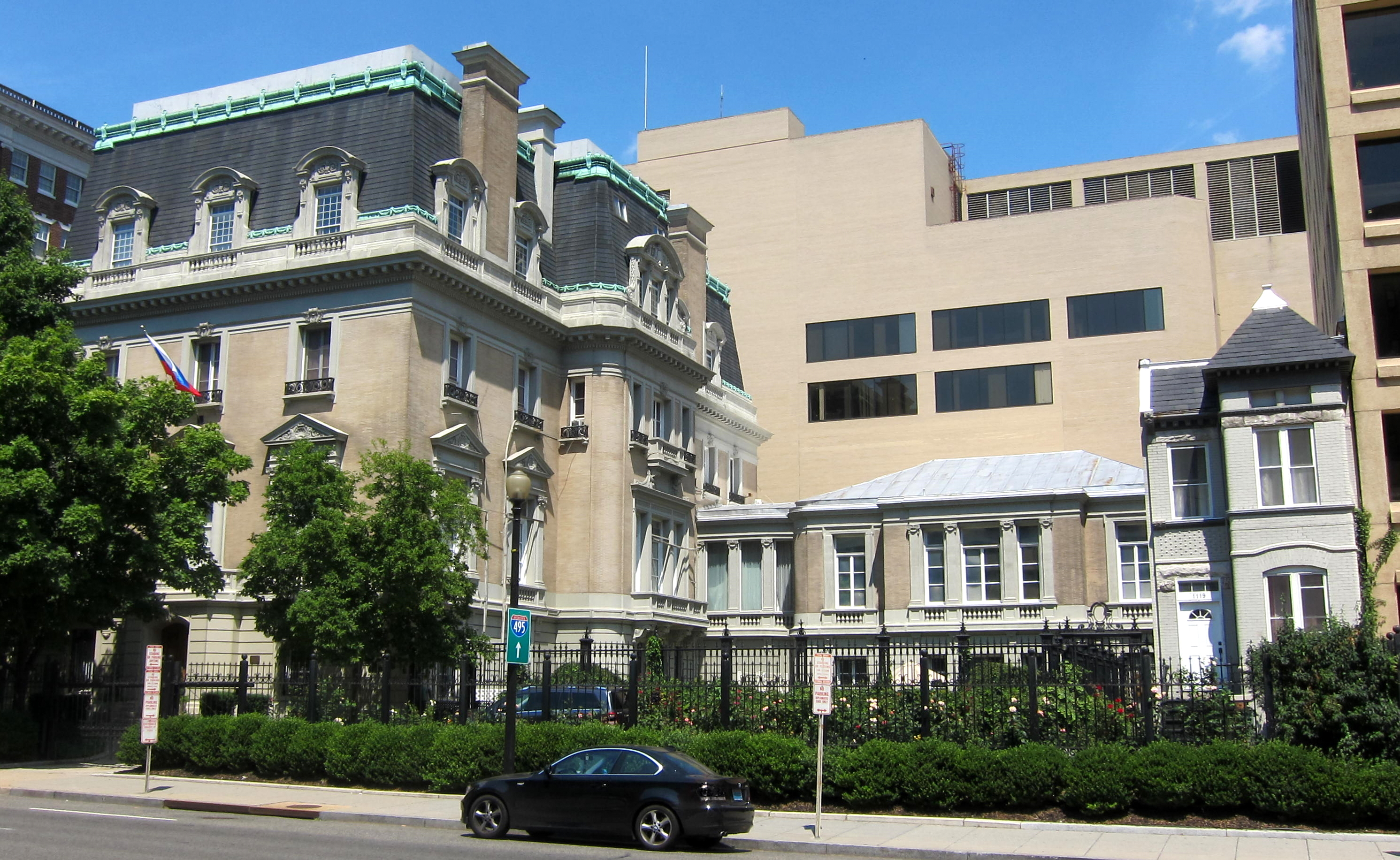
The Russian ambassador's residence at 1125 16th Street NW, designed by Wyeth in 1910.

Wyeth designed a wide range of notable works:

- Chilean ambassador's residence in Washington, D.C. (2305 Massachusetts Avenue NW; Sara S. Wyeth House, built 1909)
- Columbia Hospital for Women (2425 L Street NW; built 1913)
- D.C. Armory (2001 East Capitol Street SE; built 1941)
- D.C. Juvenile Court Building (410 E Street NW; built 1940)
- D.C. Municipal Building/East Administration Building (now the Henry J. Daly Building; 300 Indiana Avenue NW; built 1941)
- D.C. Municipal Court Building (4th Street NW between D and E Streets NW; built 1941)
- D.C. Police Court Building (about 450 5th Street Northwest; built 1937, razed 1960s)
- D.C. Recorder of Deeds Building (515 D Street NW; built 1941)
- Embassy and Chancery of Haiti (Gibson Fhanestock House, 2311 Massachusetts Avenue NW; built 1910)
- Embassy of Ivory Coast, with Francis P. Sullivan (Frederick Atherton House, 2424 Massachusetts Avenue NW; built 1930)
- Embassy of Kenya, formerly Embassy of Sweden (F.A. Keep House, 2249 R Street NW; built 1906; C. Russell Peyton House, 2249 R Street NW; built 1908)
- Embassy of Malawi (Granville Fortescue House, 2408 Massachusetts Avenue NW; built 1911)
- Embassy of Venezuela, with Francis P. Sullivan (Mrs. Wilber E. Wilder House, 1099 30th Street NW; built 1929)
- Embassy of Zambia, with William P. Cresson (Louis Arthur Coolidge House, 2419 Massachusetts Avenue NW; built 1907)
- Georgetown Neighborhood Library of the District of Columbia Public Library (built 1935)
- Mexican Cultural Institute (Franklin MacVeagh House, 2829 16th Street NW; built 1911)
- Petworth Neighborhood Library of the District of Columbia Public Library (built 1939)
- Russian ambassador's residence, with Francis P. Sullivan (Mrs. George Pullman House, 1125 16th Street NW; built 1910)

Some sources say that Wyeth also co-designed the District of Columbia War Memorial with Frederick H. Brooke and Horace Peaslee. Wyeth's name is listed on the memorial as an associate architect. But the authoritative National Park Service Cultural Landscapes Inventory and an investigation into the memorial's creation by John G. Waite Associates (at the Park Service's request) show that the memorial was almost exclusively the work of Brooke, who designed it in 1919. Wyeth and Peaslee did not join the effort until March 1925. The exact nature of Wyeth's contributions are unknown, and appear minimal. As Waite et al. have noted: "No record has been found indicating that anyone but Brooke was ever considered for the job. Once the building was 'definitely to become a reality' with the passage of Resolution 28 in 1924, Brooke informed the memorial commission that Nathan C. Wyeth and Horace W. Peaslee had agreed to act as his associates in preparing the plans. It is not entirely clear what roles Wyeth and Peaslee played in designing the memorial; except for the inclusion of their names on some of the 1924 and 1925 drawings and the base inscription, they are rarely mentioned in connection with project, and what contractual arrangements were made with them are not known." At best, only minor changes were made to the memorial after Wyeth joined the effort.

It is widely assumed that, as Municipal Architect, Wyeth designed Thomas Jefferson Junior High School. For example, Harry Gabbett of The Washington Post makes the claim. Both The New York Times and The Evening Star also assume Wyeth designed the structure, although they erroneously report it was a high school. But Wyeth attributed the work to Jessie I. Cuthriel, architectural designer, and M.F. Coe, chief of the architectural division.

Several sources also report that Wyeth designed Woodrow Wilson High School. But Wyeth told a subcommittee of the United States House Committee on Appropriations in March 1934 that he was only a consulting architect on the structure. The architectural design work on Woodrow Wilson High School was done by two private-sector architects under contract to the Office of the Municipal Architect.

Although The New York Times claimed in his obituary that Wyeth designed the Canadian Embassy (now Uzbekistan's) at 1746 Massachusetts Avenue NW, but in fact the building was designed by architect Jules Henri de Sibour in 1909 for Clarence Moore and his wife, Mabelle Swift Moore (heir to the Swift meatpacking fortune). (Note: Nor did Wyeth design the Canadian chancery at 2450 Massachusetts Avenue NW, as that structure was not built until the mid-1950s, long after he had retired.)

== Bibliography ==
- Army Corps of Engineers (1918). Annual Report of the Chief of Engineers, United States Army. Part 1. Washington, D.C.: Government Printing Office.
- Bacon, Donald C.; Davidson, Roger H.; Keller, Morton (1995). The Encyclopedia of the United States Congress. Volume 1. New York: Simon & Schuster. ISBN 9780132763615.
- Bedford, Steven (1998). John Russell Pope: Architect of Empire. New York: Rizzoli. ISBN 9780847820863.
- Bednar, Michael J. (2006). L'Enfant's Legacy: Public Open Spaces in Washington, D.C. Baltimore: Johns Hopkins University Press. ISBN 9780801883187.
- Benedetto, Robert; Du Vall, Kathleen; Donovan, Jane (2001). Historical Dictionary of Washington, D.C. Lanham, Md.: Scarecrow Press. ISBN 9780810840942.
- Commission of Fine Arts (1912). Report of the Commission of Fine Arts for the Fiscal Year Ending June 30, 1912. Washington, D.C.: Government Printing Office.
- American Institute of Architects (December 1914). "The Convention in Detail". Journal of the American Institute of Architects: 579–599.
- Derby, George, ed. (1968). The National Cyclopaedia of American Biography. New York: James T. White & Co.
- Eicher, John H.; Eicher, David J. (2001). Civil War High Commands. Stanford, Calif.: Stanford University Press. ISBN 0804736413.
- Evelyn, Douglas E.; Dickson, Paul; Ackerman, S.J. (2008). On This Spot: Pinpointing the Past in Washington, D.C. Sterling, Va.: Capital Books. ISBN 9781933102702.
- Field, Cynthia R.; Gournay, Isabelle; Somma, Thomas P. (2007). Paris on the Potomac: The French Influence on the Architecture and Art of Washington, D.C. Athens, Ohio: Ohio University Press. ISBN 9780821442395.
- Goode, James M. (2003). Capitol Losses: A Cultural History of Washington's Destroyed Buildings. Washington, D.C.: Smithsonian Institution Press. ISBN 9781588341051.
- Kohler, Sue A.; Carson, Jeffrey R. (1978). Sixteenth Street Architecture. Volume 1. Washington, D.C.: U.S. Commission of Fine Arts. hdl:2027/mdp.39015030836194.
- Kohler, Sue A.; Carson, Jeffrey R. (1988). Sixteenth Street Architecture. Volume 2. Washington, D.C.: U.S. Commission of Fine Arts. hdl:2027/mdp.39015021503290.
- Kohler, Sue A.; Carson, Jeffrey R.; Jennings, James Longstreet Sibley (1973). Massachusetts Avenue Architecture. Washington, D.C.: U.S. Government Printing Office. hdl:2027/uiug.30112003535959.
- Kresscox Associates (May 2, 1986). Historic Structures Report: Tidal Basin and Inlet Bridge (PDF) (Report). New York: Kresscox Associates.
- Lee, Antoinette J. (2000). Architects to the Nation: The Rise and Decline of the Supervising Architect's Office. New York: Oxford University Press. ISBN 9780195128222.
- Levy, Leonard Williams; Fisher, Louis (1994). Encyclopedia of the American Presidency. New York: Simon & Schuster. ISBN 9780132759830.
- Moeller, Gerard Martin; Feldblyum, Boris (2012). AIA Guide to the Architecture of Washington, D.C. Baltimore, Md.: Johns Hopkins University Press. ISBN 9781421402697.
- Myer, Donald Beekman (1974). Bridges and the City of Washington. Washington, D.C.: U.S. Commission of Fine Arts.
- National Park Service (2009). Cultural Landscapes Inventory: D.C. War Memorial, National Mall & Memorial Parks - West Potomac Park (PDF) (Report). Washington, D.C.: U.S. Department of the Interior.
- Peatross, C. Ford; Scott, Pamela; Tepfer, Diane; Freudenheim, Leslie Mandelson (2005). Capital Drawings: Architectural Designs for Washington, D.C., From the Library of Congress. Baltimore, Md.: The Johns Hopkins University Press. ISBN 9780801872327.
- Scott, Pamela; Lee, Antoinette Josephine (1993). Buildings of the District of Columbia. New York: Oxford University Press. ISBN 9780195061468.
- Seale, William (1992). The White House: The History of an American Idea. Washington, D.C.: American Institute of Architects Press. ISBN 9781558350489.
- Striner, Richard; Blair, Melissa (2014). Washington and Baltimore Art Deco: A Design History of Neighboring Cities. Baltimore, Md.: Johns Hopkins University Press. ISBN 9781421411620.
- Subcommittee of the House Committee on Appropriations (1934). District of Columbia Appropriation Bill for 1935. 73rd Cong., 2d sess. Washington, D.C.: U.S. Government Printing Office. hdl:2027/mdp.39015069442955.
- Waite, John G.; Palazzo, Clay S.; Rankin, Nancy; Jenkins, Chelle M.; Britt, Carrie M. (May 2006). District of Columbia War Memorial: Historic Structure Report and Cultural Landscape Assessment (PDF) (Report). New York: John G. Waite Associates, Architects PLLC.
- Warner, Ezra J. (1964). Generals in Blue: Lives of the Union Commanders. Baton Rouge, La.: Louisiana State University Press. ISBN 0807108227.
