= George Emerson Brewer =

American surgeon and urologist (1861–1939)

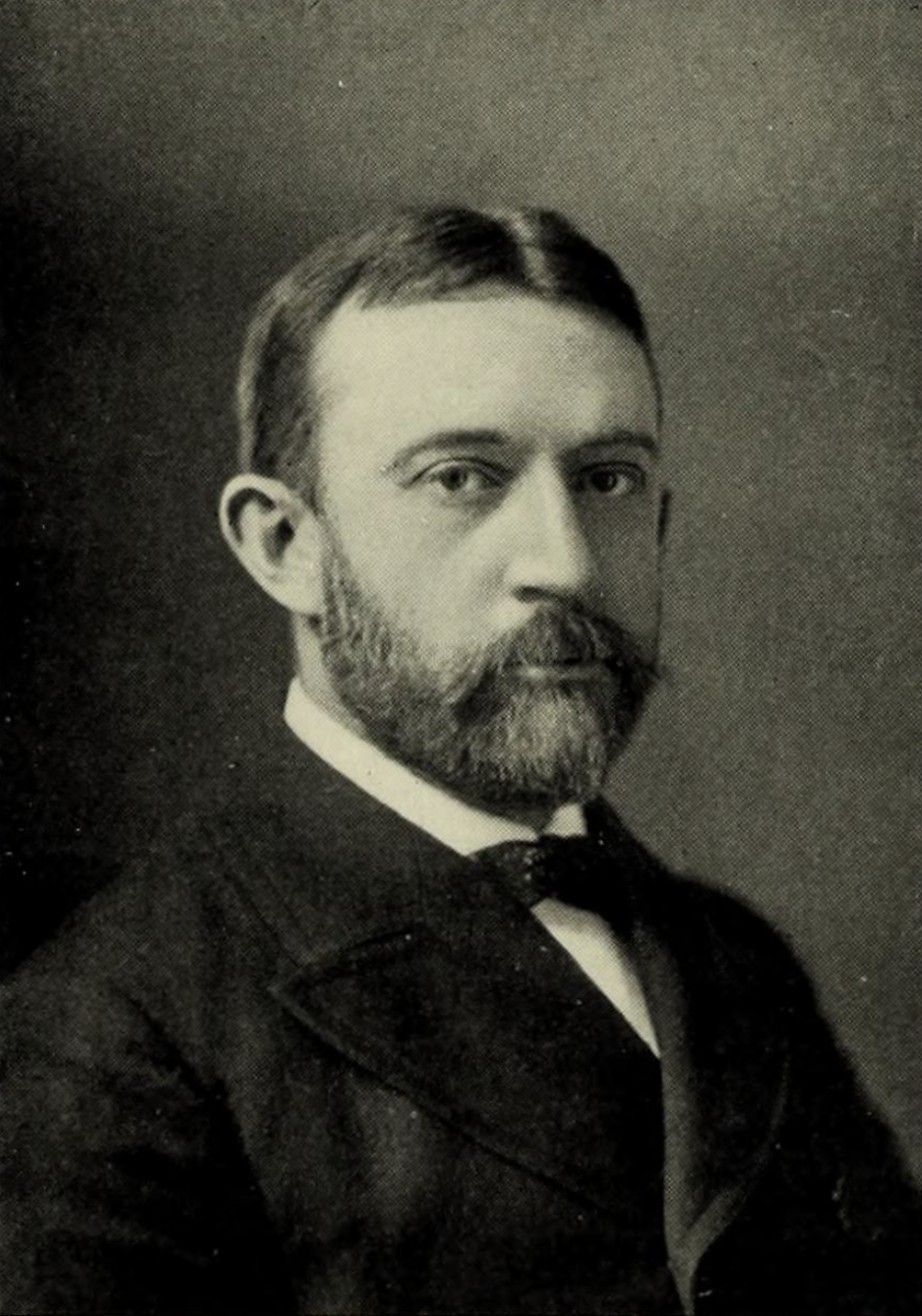
- Born: July 28, 1861; Westfield, New York
- Died: December 24, 1939 (aged 78); New York City, New York
- Education: Hamilton College, A.B. (1881), A.M. (1884); Harvard University M.D. (1885)
- Known for: Brewer infarcts
- Medical career
- Profession: surgeon; urologist
- Institutions: Columbia Hospital for Women; Johns Hopkins Hospital; Presbyterian Hospital; Roosevelt Hospital

George Emerson Brewer (July 28, 1861 – December 24, 1939) was an American surgeon and urologist known for his contributions to the eponymous Brewer infarcts.

== Biography ==
George Brewer was born on 28 July 1861 in Westfield, New York, the son of physician Francis B. Brewer. He graduated from Hamilton College in 1881 and studied medicine at the University at Buffalo and the College of Medicine at Harvard, graduating with a M.D. degree in 1885. He worked at the Columbia Hospital for Women and Johns Hopkins Hospital before starting work in New York City in 1887. He also began teaching at the Columbia University College of Physicians and Surgeons. He became attending surgeon at the Roosevelt and Presbyterian Hospitals in New York. In 1893 he married Effie Leighton Brown of Chester, Pennsylvania.

He was the founder, and first president, of the Society of Clinical Surgery, and was president of the American Surgical Association. He was president of the Clinical Congress of Surgeons of North America, and became surgical director of the Presbyterian Hospital in 1913. He was the author of Textbook on Surgery and Surgical Diagnosis. Hamilton College awarded him the degree of LL.D. in 1916, and Columbia University awarded him Sc.D. (hon) in 1929. He became an honorary fellow of the Royal College of Surgeons in Ireland in 1920.

In 1917 he, along with 22 other doctors and 65 nurses from the Presbyterian Base Unit of the American Red Cross, travelled to France on active duty in the First World War. Brewer became the Director of Base Hospital 2 in Etretat. In August 1917 he was part of an American surgical team, which also included Harvey Cushing, who tried to save Lt. Edward Revere Osler, the only son of Sir William Osler, who was wounded at the 3rd Battle of Ypres. In 1918 he became Consulting Surgeon to the 42nd Division of the American Expeditionary Force, and later became Chief Consultant to the First Army.

He retired in 1928, and travelled to France to study anthropology, and was made Research Associate of Somatic Anthropology at the American Museum of Natural History on his return to the United States. He was diagnosed with bladder cancer in 1937, which was treated by radiotherapy for two years; he deteriorated in December 1939, and died on 24 December 1939 at the Presbyterian Hospital in New York.
