= 2205 Massachusetts Avenue =

House in Washington, D.C.

2500 Massachusetts Avenue
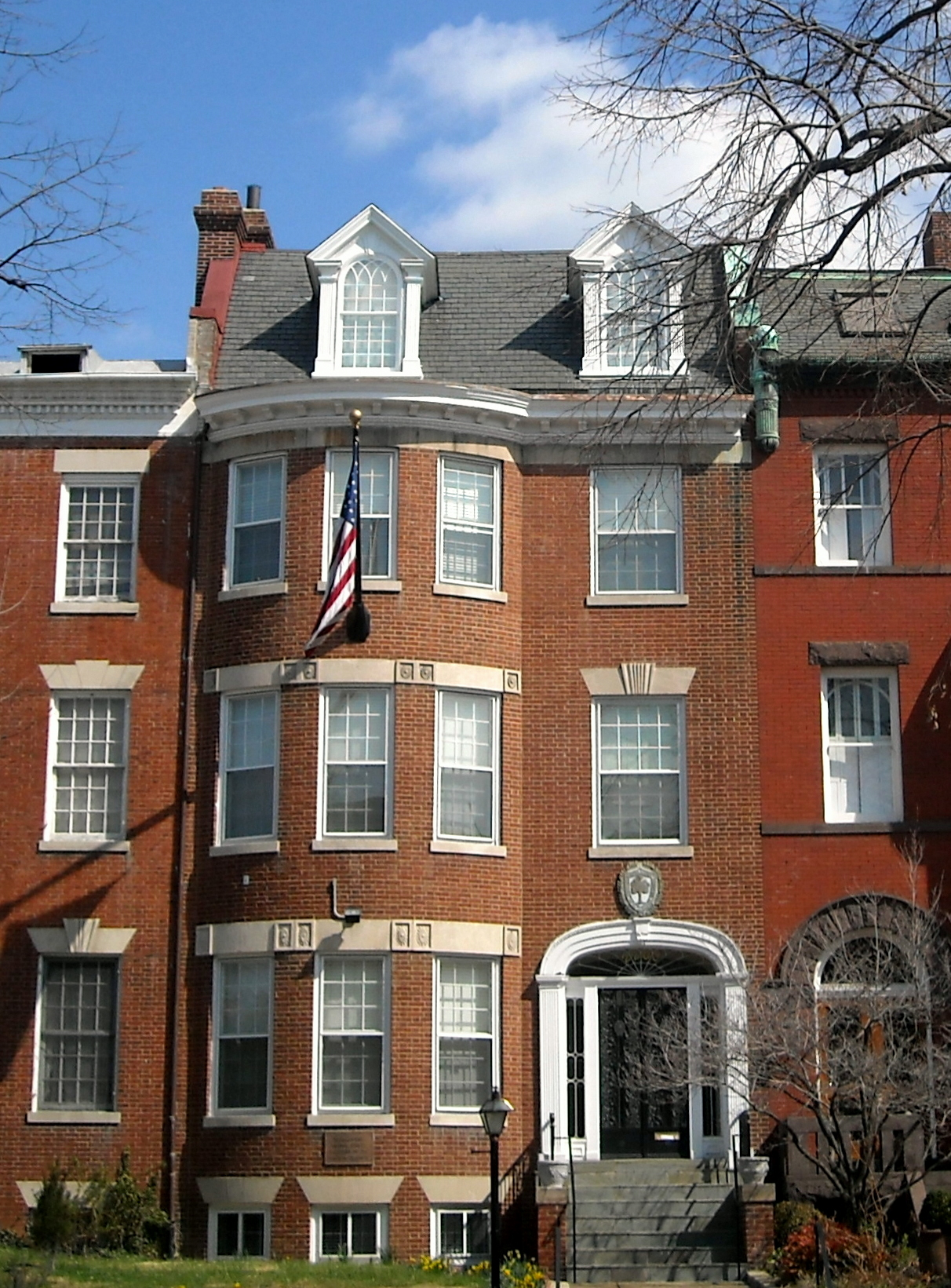
- The house in 2009.

- Location within the United States
- 38°54′43.2″N 77°2′57.3″W
- Location: 2205 Massachusetts Ave, NW, Washington, D.C., U.S

Site notes
- Architects: Louis D. Meline; Nathan C. Wyeth; Louis E. Sholtes
- Architectural style: Colonial Revival
- Owner: Annie Jenness Miller (previous); E. H. Aslop (previous); Frank Putnam Flint (previous); Oliver Hazard Perry Johnson (previous); Embassy of Iraq (previous); National Society Daughters of the American Colonists (current)

2205 Massachusetts Avenue is a historic mansion on Embassy Row in Washington, D.C. The house has served as the headquarters of the National Society Daughters of the American Colonists since 1960.

== History ==
The townhome is located on Embassy Row in the Sheridan-Kalorama Historic District of Washington, D.C.

The architect Louis D. Meline built the house in 1902. The architect Nathan C. Wyeth made changes in 1905 for Annie Jenness Miller. The architect Waddy B. Wood redid the house in 1920 for E. H. Aslop. The architect Louis E. Sholtes worked on the house in 1922.

The house was the Washington, D.C. residence of Republican Senator Frank Putnam Flint of California. It was also, at one point, owned by Oliver Hazard Perry Johnson, the vice president of the National Metropolitan Bank. The Embassy of Iraq in Washington, D.C. owned the residence.

In 1960, the house was purchased by the National Society Daughters of the American Colonists to serve as their headquarters. It also houses their national archives and library.
