= Brewer infarcts =

Histological finding in renal disease

Brewer infarcts are a histological finding found in renal disease. They can indicate pyelonephritis.

They are named after George Emerson Brewer.
