= Lucy Leavenworth Wilder Morris =

American teacher and historian

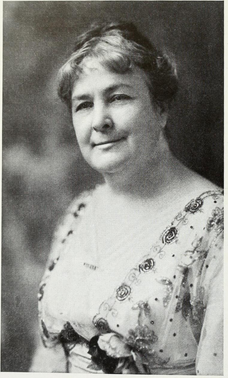
- Morris in 1918

Minnesota State Regentt, Daughters of the American Colonists

Personal details
- Born: Lucy Leavenworth Wilder; 1865 Evanston, Illinois, U.S.
- Died: 1935 (aged 69–70)
- Spouse: James T. Morris
- Occupation: historian teacher

Lucy Leavenworth Wilder Morris (1865 – 1935) was an American teacher and historian. She served as Minnesota state regent for the National Society Daughters of the American Colonists.

== Early life and education ==
Morris was born in Evanston, Illinois. She was the great-granddaughter of a patriot of the American Revolution. She was educated at schools in Illinois. She moved to Houston County, Minnesota in 1878. She later moved to LaCrosse, Wisconsin to further her education before returning to Minnesota.

== Career ==
Morris was a teacher, author, and historian. She began teaching in country schools in Minnesota when she was sixteen years old. She authored travel guides, children's books, and magazine articles.

In 1894, she joined the Daughters of the American Revolution. She collaborated with other members to record, transcribe, and edit stories about 154 women and men who settled in the Minnesota Territory. In 1914, she officially published Old Rail Fence Corners: Frontier Tales Told by Minnesota Pioneers.

In 1922, Morris founded the Minnesota State Society of the Daughters of the American Colonists, launching a project focused on protecting the site at the east end of Stone Arch Bridge, where Father Louis Hennepin allegedly came upon the Saint Anthony Falls in 1680 with the help of Native American guides. In 1924, she persuaded the St. Anthony Falls Water Power Company to grant an easement for a small park. She led the Daughters of the American Colonists in developing the half-acre plot of land, added fences and a gate, planted trees, and secured a large boulder to place a commemorative plaque. The park was dedicated in honor of Morris in 1924 and was officially named the Lucy Wilder Morris Park.

== Personal life ==
She married James T. Morris, a lumber businessman and lender.
