= National Society Daughters of the American Colonists =

American patriotic organization

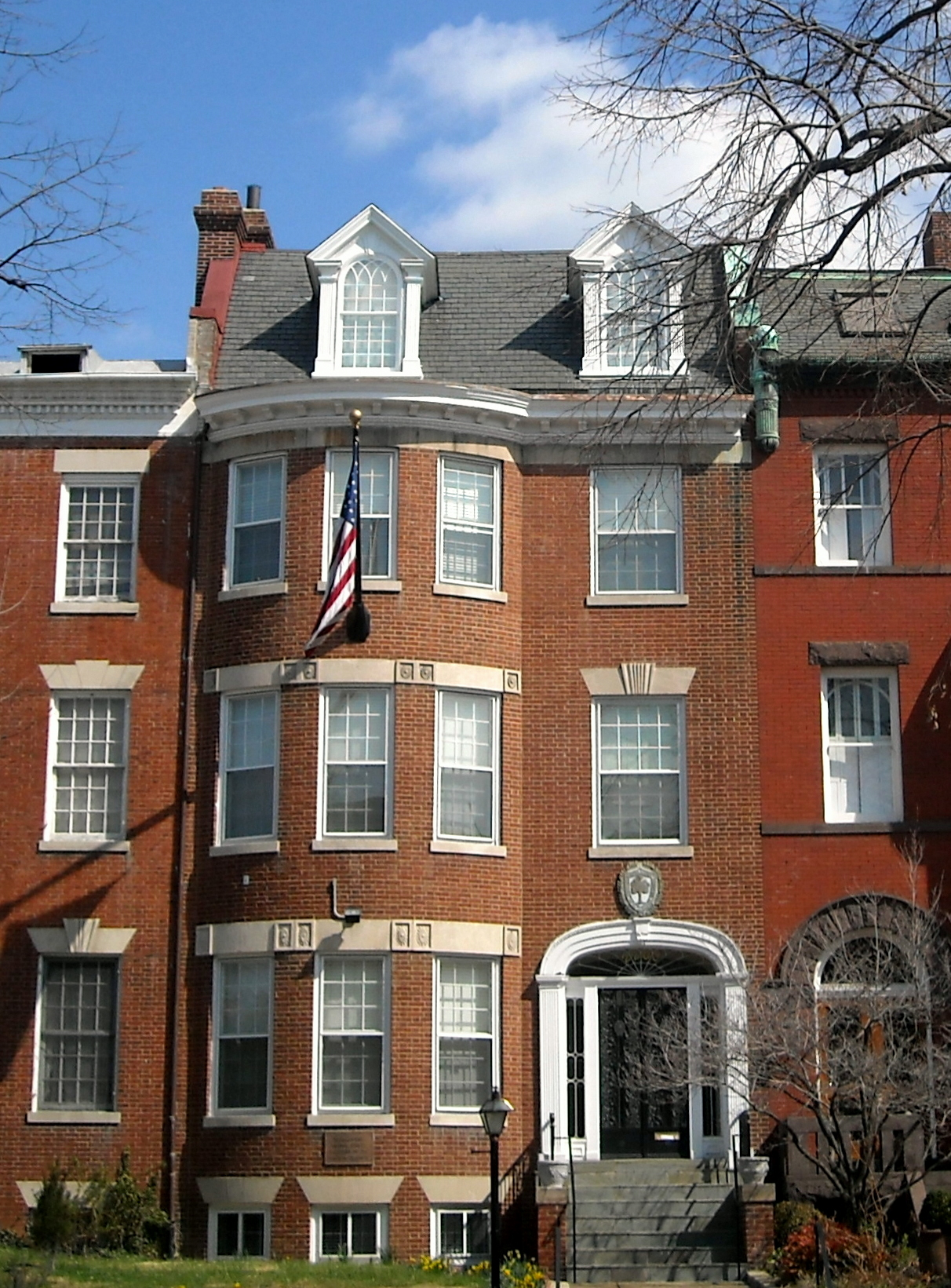
- NSDAC National Headquarters in Washington, D.C.
- Abbreviation: NSDAC
- Founded: December 9, 1920 (105 years ago)
- Founder: Sarah Mitchell Guernsey
- Founded at: Planters Hotel; St. Louis, Missouri, U.S.
- Type: Patriotic organization
- Tax ID no.: 52-0744866
- Purpose: Historic preservation, education, patriotism
- Headquarters: 2205 Massachusetts Avenue, Washington, D.C.
- Coordinates: 38.91222°N 77.04925°W
- Region served: United States
- Official language: English
- National President: Mary Raye Kiser Casper
- Publication: The Colonial Courier
- Affiliations: National Society Sons of the American Colonists
- Website: nsdac.org

The National Society Daughters of the American Colonists (NSDAC), commonly known as the Daughters of the American Colonists, is an American patriotic organization and lineage society for women headquartered in Washington, D.C. Members must be lineal descendants of a person who rendered civil or military service in one of the Thirteen Colonies prior to July 4, 1776.

== History ==
The Daughters of the American Colonists was founded on December 9, 1920 by Sarah Elizabeth Mitchell Guernsey at the Planters Hotel in St. Louis, Missouri and was federally chartered in 1984. The founding members, along with Guernsey, were Ida M. Schaaf, Emma Wagoner Long, Lavinia Crow Reilly, Harriet Holbrook Norris, Margaret Blaine Campbell, Euphrates S. Pearson, Nola P. Hatch, Jennie Bowles Thomas, Emily Willet Davis, Stella Hereford Ball, Dora Eddleman Simmons, and Minnie Walker Wilcox. The society's object is to research and preserve the history and deeds of American colonists and commemorate deeds of colonial interest. The organization is headquartered at 2205 Massachusetts Avenue on Embassy Row in Washington, D.C.

There are various chapters of the Daughters of the American Colonists and over 196 historical markers have been erected by the society, including the Original Patentees Memorial at President's Park South which was erected in 1936. In 1940, the Arizona Society of the Daughters of the American Colonists was organized which in 1991 had chapters in three cities.

The organization reported revenue of $298,332 and expenses of $224,973, with net assets of $2,377,379, in 2024.

== Membership ==
Membership is open to American women who are at least 18 years old and are lineal descendants of someone who rendered civil or military service in one of the Thirteen Colonies before July 4, 1776.

== Notable members ==
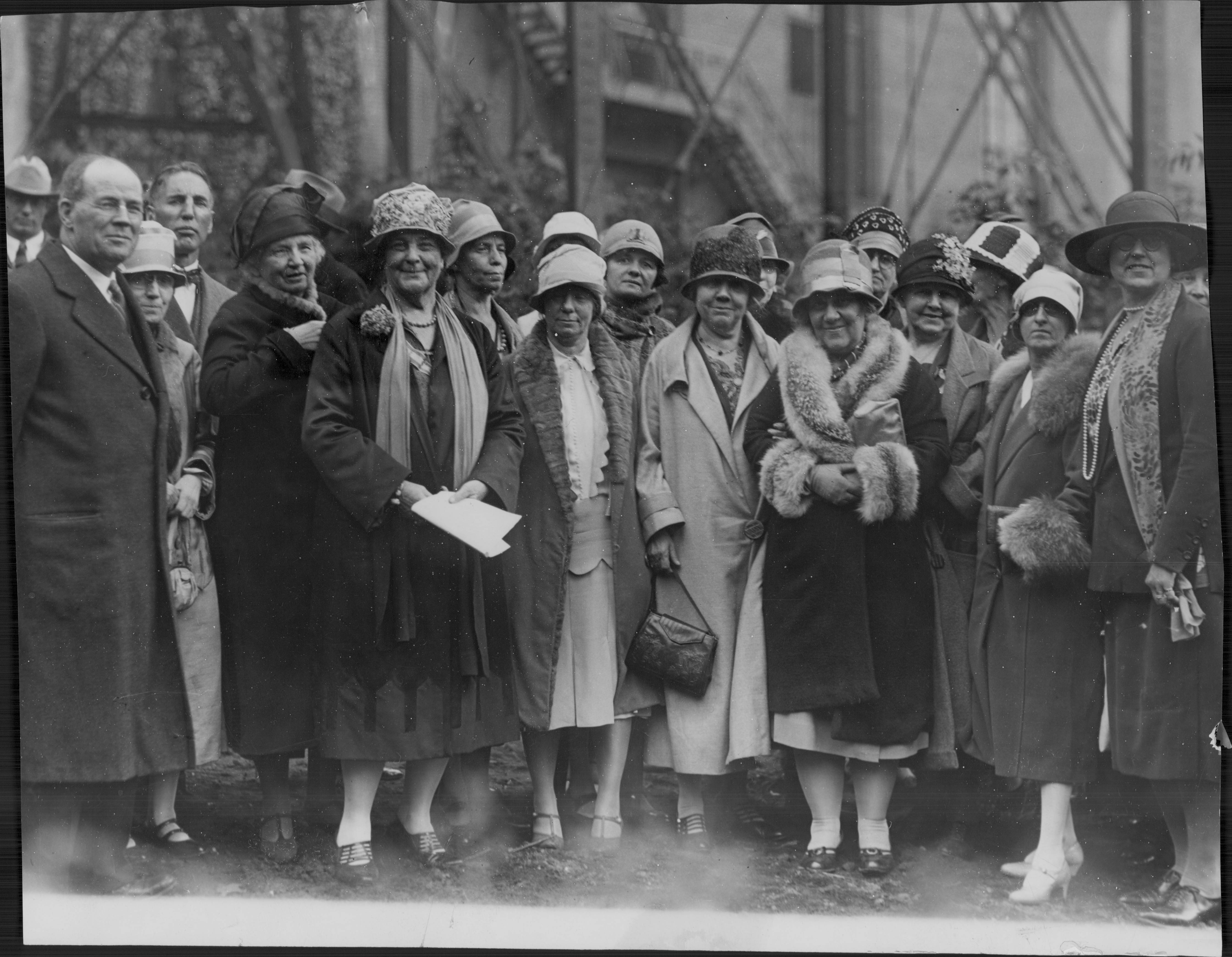
Lucy Leavenworth Wilder Morris and other Daughters with Lt. Gov William I. Nolan of Minnesota

- Rachel Darden Davis, physician and politician
- Denise Doring VanBuren, lineage society leader
- Ruth Coltrane Cannon, preservationist, historian, and philanthropist
- Margaret Wootten Collier, writer
- Jane Grier Durden, schoolteacher and lineage society leader
- Ann Davison Duffie Fleck, lineage society leader and musician
- Sarah Elizabeth Mitchell Guernsey, educator and lineage society leader
- Ida Sherman Jenne, lineage society leader
- Kitty O'Brien Joyner, electrical engineer
- Sarah McKelley King, lineage society leader and political candidate
- Lucy Leavenworth Wilder Morris, historian and teacher
- Almyra Maynard Watson, officer in the United States Army Nurse Corps
- Jeanne Fox Weinmann, lineage society leader
- Edith Wire, composer and pianist
- Grace Steele Woodward, writer and historian
- Josephine McDonald Yarbrough, writer
- Lynn Forney Young, civic leader and clubwoman

== See also ==
- List of hereditary and lineage organizations in the United States
