= George Town Public Library, Cayman Islands =

Library in Cayman Islands

George Town Public Library
- 19°17′47″N 81°22′53″W
- Location: George Town, Cayman Islands
- Type: Public Library
- Established: 1920

Other information
- Director: Paul Robinson MSC, BA, AD/DIP, CILIP, ALA
- Website: Official site

The George Town Public Library is the main library of the Cayman Islands Public Library Service, a department of the Cayman Islands Ministry of Education. It is located in George Town, capital of the Cayman Islands. It has been designated as a place of historic significance and has been referred to as "one of the country’s most important national assets."

== History ==
The George Town Public Library began in 1920 as a small room above the city's old jail and was funded as a subscription library through a $40 grant from the Cayman Islands government. A separate library building was finished in 1939, designed by Captain Roland Bodden and Captain Rayal Bodden, with a ceiling modeled after an inverted ship's hull. While the library was opened to the public in 1940, it was not until 1980 that it was staffed with a trained, professional librarian. The library was expanded in 2009 to include the modernized, three-story Maples Wing, providing a children's services area and public computers with internet access. Early in 2017, a renovation of the historic library building was completed in order to showcase local Caymanian history and culture.
