= Annie Jenness Miller =

American fashion designer

Anna Jenness Miller
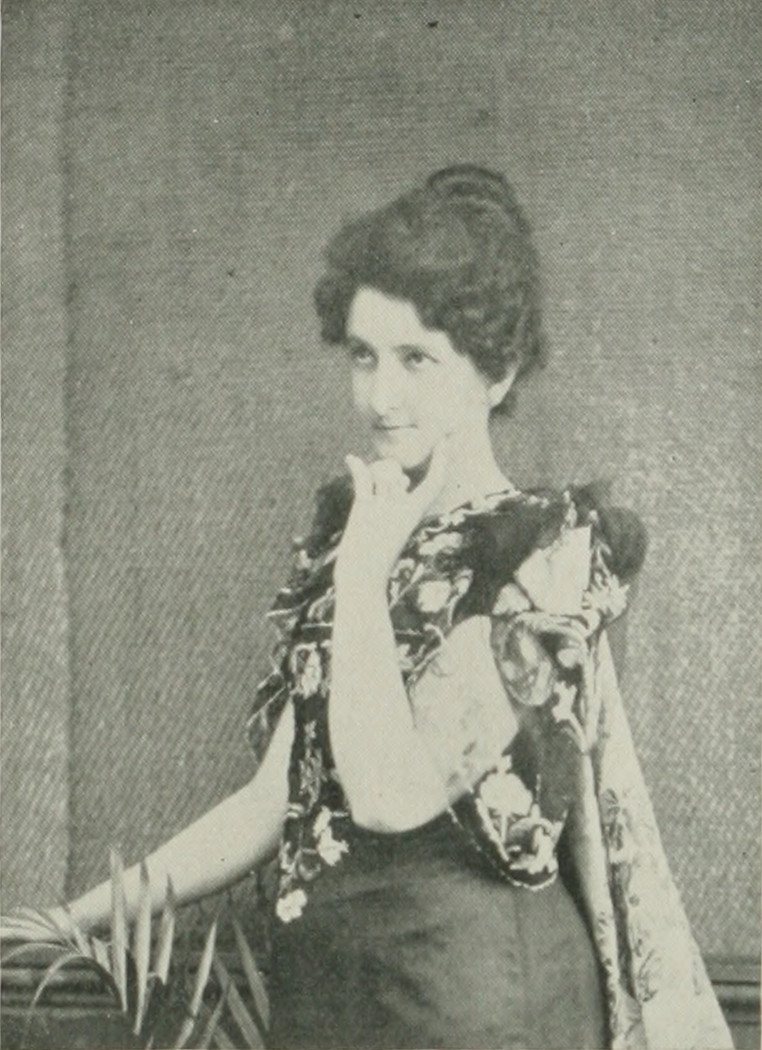
- Born: January 28, 1859; New Hampshire, United States
- Died: August 1935 (aged 76); Washington, D.C., United States
- Occupations: Clothing designer, author, lecturer
- Spouse: Conrad Miller (m. 1884)

Anna Jenness Miller (January 28, 1859 – August 1935) was a pioneering American clothing designer and an advocate for dress reform, as well as an author and lecturer. Her main goals were to be an "advocate of correct principles of physical development and dress for women." She also wanted to educate mass groups of men and women about the importance of hygiene and health to prevent the spread of diseases. As a lecturer, she spoke about human rights, arguing for equality.

== Ancestry and early life ==
Miller's father was Solomon Jenness and her mother was Susan Wendell Jenness, both New England natives. She was also descended from the family of Oliver Wendell Holmes Sr and Wendell Phillips.

Miller was born in the White Mountains of New Hampshire in 1859. Although she was born in New Hampshire, she moved to Boston and stayed there until she married Conrad Miller in 1884. Before she was married, she was known in Boston as a "Women in Letters", a prestigious title in Boston, Massachusetts. This included women such as Louisa May Alcott, Julia Ward Howe, Susan Paul, Maria Stewart, and Lucy Stone. Women in Letters were activists, writers, and strove for positive changes in social justice.

== Dress reform ==
Dress reform is defined as wearing and designing clothing that is more practical and more comfortable than fashion during a specific time period. During the mid to late 1800s, Victorian dress reform also meant a rise in feminism, athletic wear, and undergarments. Dress reformers, such as Annie Miller, promoted a larger waist bodice called an emancipation waist. The emancipation waist was still tight however, it was not a corset. Dress reformers were trying to eliminate the need for always wearing corsets to opt for more comfortable and more practical daily attire. More effective and enjoyable undergarments were to follow after the achievement of the emancipation waist due to the success and attention it received by many reformers, activists, and even men enjoyed wearing the "reform" bodices in the winter under their clothing.

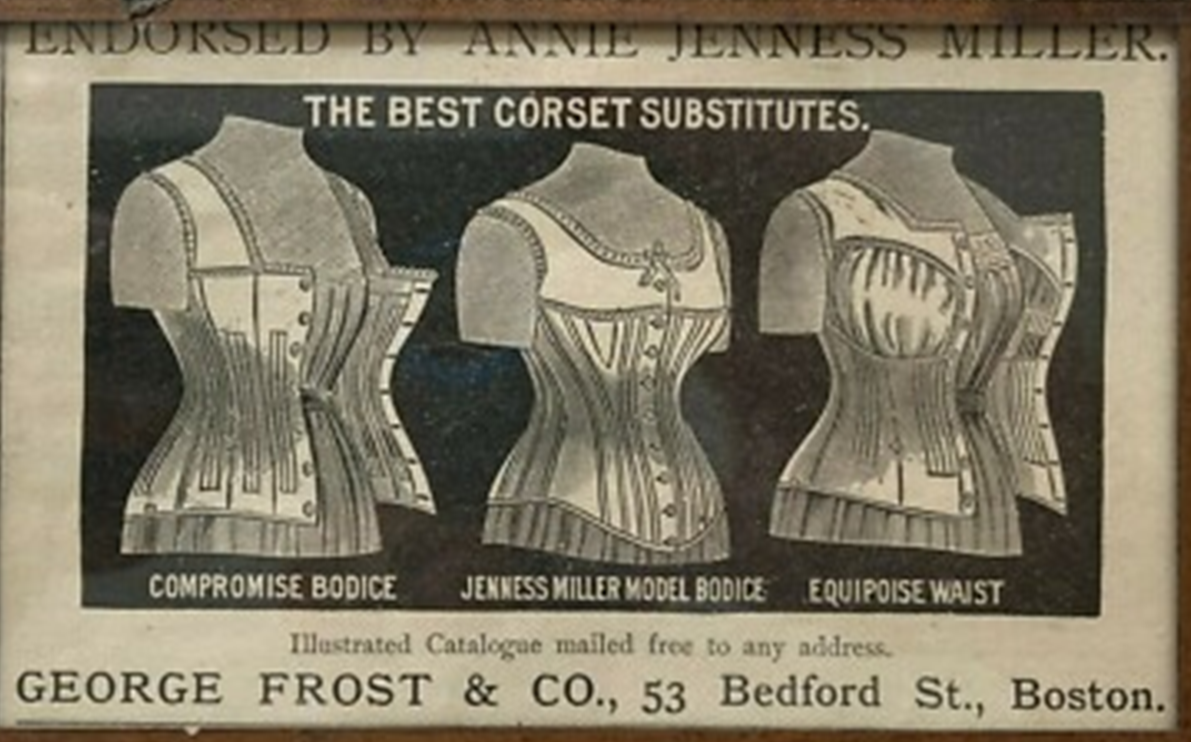
Advertisement for undergarments from George Frost & Co.

Another iconic article of clothing that was invented during this time was called the bloomers suit. The bloomers suit was renamed to just bloomers. Bloomers were loose pants that bunched up at the bottom and usually paired with a dress or skirt. Women who wore this typically were victims of harassment in public.

Miller also wrote a book, Mother and Babe that included plans, patterns, and ideas for better clothing for babies.

Novelty, exaggeration and display have been the ends sought. The body has been cramped and distorted, its requirements for health and comfort disregarded according to the caprice of fashion's arbiters. The fundamental laws of beauty have been violated, and the human form robbed of its expression to what end? Who can answer? One might offer defense of the dress of today, but he would be compelled to reverse his decision tomorrow, for what obtains today may be regarded by the fashionable world tomorrow as "perfectly hideous," as women are often heard to say of fashion plates that are out of date...When art in dress becomes recognized, every walk in life and every occasion will have its appropriate dress, and every class of society 'will be the gainer. Under the regime of art in dress no woman will be seen picking her way along filthy streets in a dress-skirt bedraggled with mud, nor will women wear gems and rich fabrics at church, cloth tailor-made gowns in the reception room and high hats loaded with bustling and aggressive trimmings at the theater. We shall not be served by kitchen girls arrayed in tawdry finery; shop girls in cheap jewelry and cotton lace, nor denied ourselves the privilege of proper selection in dress for time and place in any profession. In short, with the study of principles order will evolve from chaos, and each department of work will have its recognized dress, appropriate in detail, self-respecting, because the right thing for our immediate needs, and beautiful because appropriate.

— Annie Jenness Miller

== Later years, death, and legacy ==
As an advocate for dress reform, Miller lectured all over the United States and Canada on topics on athletics and dress, and designed a costume for women which she claimed "fulfilled the requirements of both hygiene and art."

She was the author of two books: Physical Beauty and Father, Mother and Babe. Physical Beauty talks about her opinions of what is physical beauty, going against higher ideals, individuality, and the dress reform, and many other topics.

Miller would also "patent and sell clothing for athletics, leisure and even a business suit for women. But her styles hewed somewhat to the accepted norms so as not to be too provocative. Her middle way appealed to many women who simply wanted comfortable clothes, not a full-on fashion revolution."

For the last years of her life, she resided in Washington, D.C., where she had a large real estate interest.
