= William Penn Cresson =

American architect (1873–1932)

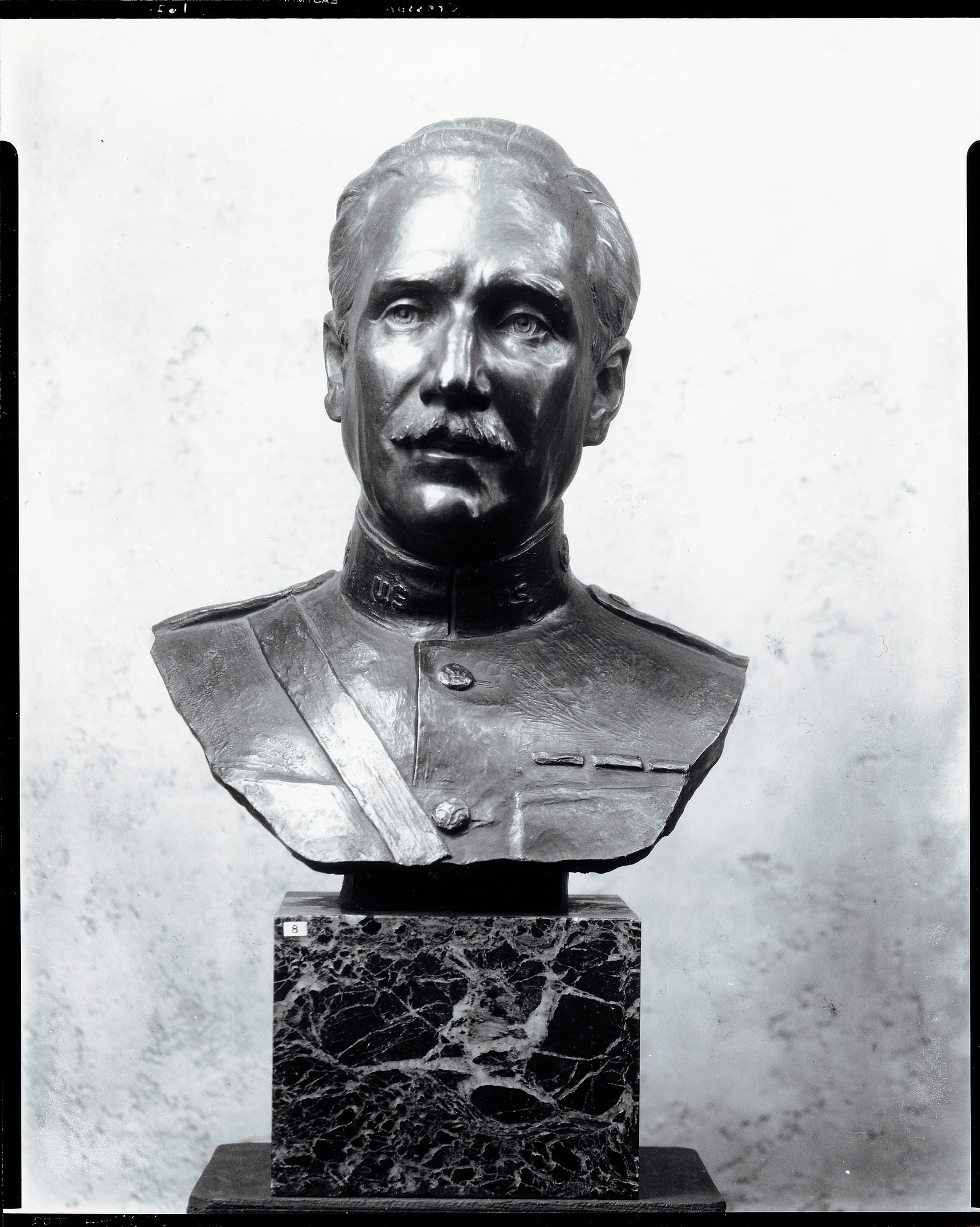
- Sculpture of William Penn Cresson created by his wife Margaret
- Born: September 17, 1873; Claymont, Delaware, U.S.
- Died: May 12, 1932 (aged 58); Stockbridge, Massachusetts, U.S.
- Occupations: Architect; author; diplomat; professor
- Known for: Designer of the Embassy of Ireland, Washington, D.C.

William Penn Cresson (September 17, 1873 – May 12, 1932) was an American architect, author, diplomat, and husband of sculptor Margaret French Cresson (1889–1973).

== Early life and education ==
William Penn Cresson was in Claymont, Delaware, on September 17, 1873. He studied at the University of Pennsylvania from 1895 until graduation in 1897. Shortly after graduation, Cresson moved to France to study at the influential École des Beaux-Arts until 1902, when he went on to become a student at the École Libre des Sciences Politiques.

== Career ==
Cresson arrived in Washington, D.C., in 1905 where he practiced Architecture for two or three years. During this time, he worked in partnership with fellow American architect Nathan C Wyeth at their architecture firm "Wyeth & Cresson" whose offices were located at 1517 H Street, N.W within Washington, D.C. It was during this time that he was involved in a number of building designs including the current Embassy of Ireland in Washington.

In 1907, Cresson left Washington to become a cattle rancher in Nevada, where he worked for two years.

Cresson's diplomatic career began in 1909 when he was appointed Secretary to the American Legation in Lima, Peru. He was then appointed to various diplomatic posts such as the Second Secretary to the United States Embassy in London from 1912 until 1913 and from 1913 onward, Cresson was appointed Secretary to the American Legation in various foreign missions such as Quito, Ecuador; Panama, Petrograd, and Lisbon.

=== World War I ===
During World War I – Cresson was commissioned as Lieutenant in the Aviation Section of the U.S Signal Corp's reserve component and was subsequently promoted to captain. He was posted as chief of the American Military Mission at the Belgian General Headquarters during the war. During this time he was decorated a Chevalier of the Order of Leopold and received the Croix de Guerre.

When the war ended, he continued his service as a Major in the Reserve Officer's Training Corps – as well as accepting a post as Assistant Professor of International Law in Princeton University. Later Cresson went on to become a professor of International Law at Tufts College working for the Fletcher School.

Cresson remained active in diplomatic affairs – serving as Chief of the Military Secretary at the Washington Naval Conference in Washington, D.C., and diplomatic secretary at the Sixth Pan-American Conference in Havana, Cuba.

In 1922 Columbia University conferred upon him the degree of Doctor of Philosophy. He was a Fellow of the Royal Geographical Society, London and also a member of the American Society of International Law.

Prior to his death, Cresson was serving as President of the Laurel Hill Association in Stockbridge, MA since 1926

== Private life ==
By the end of 1920, Cresson was engaged to well-known sculptor Margaret French, the daughter of Daniel Chester French. The couple traveled to Taormina, Sicily to spend the winter – before the marriage ceremony in January 1921. The attendance included the then US Ambassador to Italy; Robert Underwood Johnson, Mrs. Johnson, and Councillor of the US Embassy at Rome; Franklin M. Gunther – who served as Cresson's best-man.

They maintained homes in both Washington, D.C., and Stockbridge, Massachusetts.

== Death ==
On May 12, 1932, Cresson died after a prolonged illness at the French's family estate in Stockbridge – Chesterwood. The funeral was held in St. Paul's Episcopal Church, Stockbridge. His remains were cremated and later buried in Oaks, Pennsylvania.

== Bibliography ==
- Persia, The Awakening East (ISBN 1176927841)
- The Cossacks, Their History and Country (ISBN 1178134350
- The Holy Alliance, The European Background of the Monroe Doctrine
- Diplomatic Portraits
- Francis Dana, a Puritan Diplomat at the Court of Catherine the Great
