= Sarah Elizabeth Mitchell Guernsey =

Founder of the National Society Daughters of American Colonists

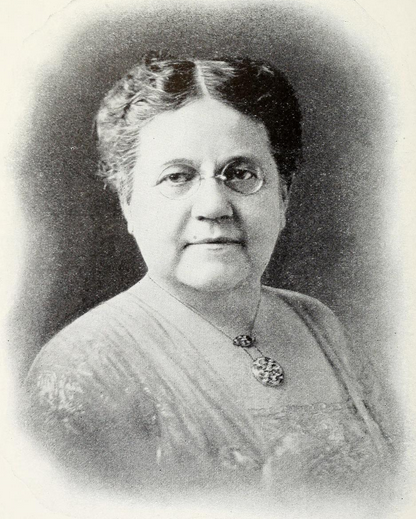
- Guernsey in 1918

1st President General of the National Society Daughters of the American Colonists

10th President General of the National Society Daughters of the American Revolution
- In office 1917–1920
- Preceded by: Daisy Allen Story
- Succeeded by: Anne Rogers Minor

Personal details
- Born: Sarah Elizabeth Mitchell; 1860; Salem, Ohio, U.S.
- Died: 1939
- Spouse: George Thatcher Mitchell
- Occupation: schoolteacher, principal, philanthropist

Sarah Elizabeth Mitchell Guernsey (1860–1939), also known as Mrs. George Thatcher Guernsey, was an American educator and philanthropist. She served as the 10th president general of the National Society Daughters of the American Revolution and was the founder of the National Society Daughters of the American Colonists.

== Early life and family ==
Guernsey was born Sarah Elizabeth Mitchell in 1860 in Salem, Ohio to Daniel P. Mitchell and Ann Eliza Baker. Her great-great-grandfather, Rev. John Mitchell, served as a private in the Virginia Militia and in Captain James Pendelton's company in the First Continental Artillery during the American Revolutionary War. She was also a descendant of Rev. Anthony Jacob Henkel, who came to the colonies in 1717 as one of the founders of the Lutheran Church in America.

== Adult life ==
After graduating from the Kansas State Normal School, Guernsey worked as a schoolteacher for four years. In 1879, she moved to Independence, Kansas to serve as principal of the local high school.

She was elected President General of the National Society Daughters of the American Revolution and served in that position from 1917 to 1920. During her first week in office, she formed the War Relief Service Committee. She traveled around the country attending many state conferences and chapter meetings of the DAR, including meetings in 41 states, Cuba, France, and England. She traveled to France following World War I, visiting Tilloloy, where the DAR would rebuild the municipal water system. She was the first president general of the DAR to visit Alaska.

On December 9, 1920, Guernsey founded the National Society Daughters of the American Colonists, a lineage society for women who are lineal descendants of people who served in military or civil capacities in one of the Thirteen Colonies before July 4, 1776.
