= Columbia Hospital for Women =

Hospital in Washington, D.C., U.S.

Coordinates: 38°54′15″N 77°3′9″W

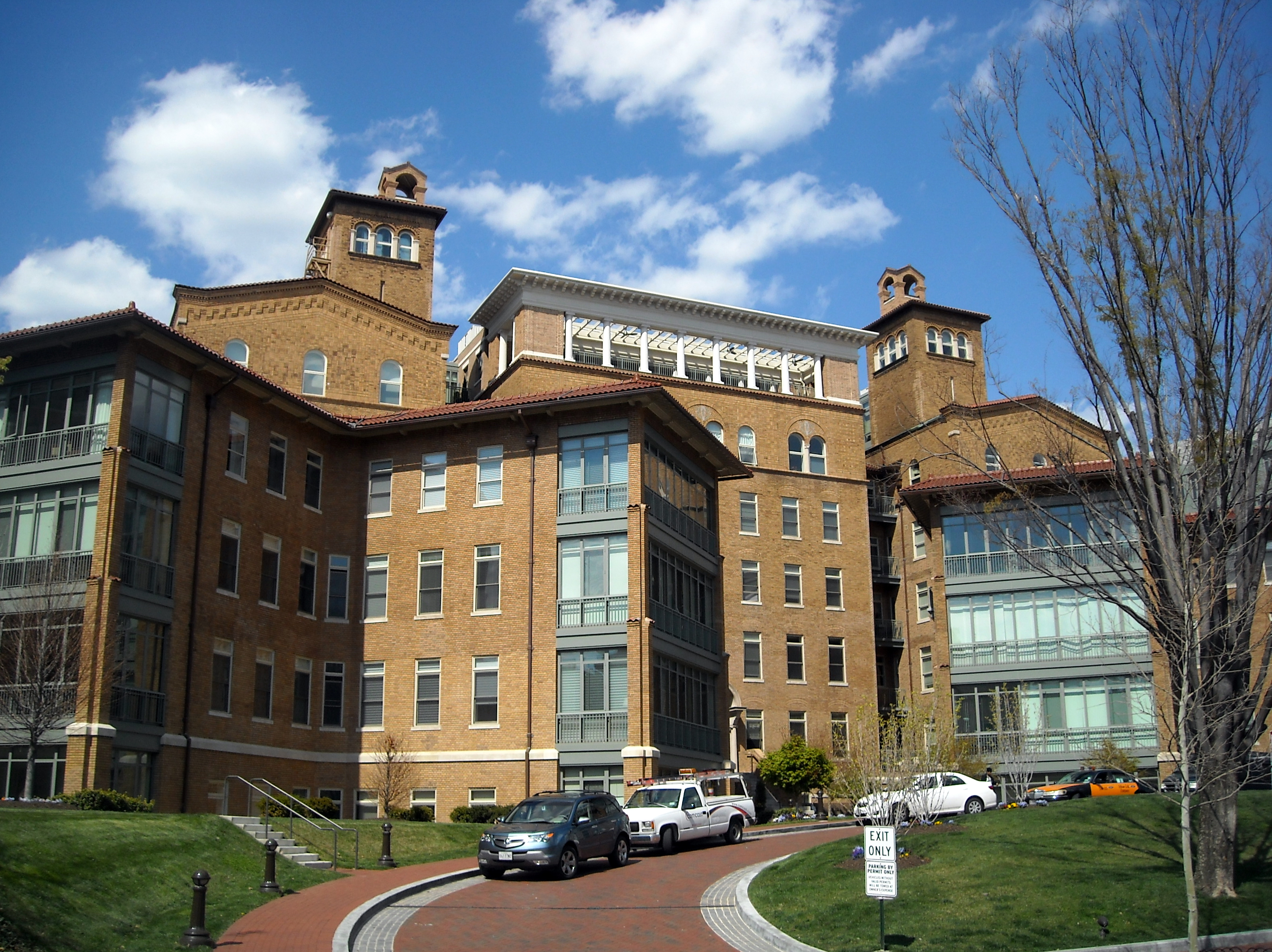
The Columbia Residences, formerly known as the Columbia Hospital for Women, in Washington, D.C.

The Columbia Hospital for Women was a former hospital located in Washington, D.C. Originally opening in 1866 as a health-care facility for wives and widows of Civil War soldiers, it moved in 1870 from Thomas Circle to its later location at 2425 L Street, NW in the West End neighborhood. American architect, Nathan Wyeth, designed the brick structure; construction began in 1913, and opened its doors in 1916. The Columbia became a private, non-profit hospital when President Dwight D. Eisenhower signed legislation transferring it to a board of directors in 1953.

The facility closed in 2002 and the building was converted into a condominium, The Columbia Residences. Among the more than 275,000 people born at Columbia Hospital for Women were Duke Ellington, Al Gore, Julie Nixon Eisenhower, Katherine Heigl. and Rob O'Brien.
