= Georgetown Neighborhood Library =

Public library in Washington, D.C.

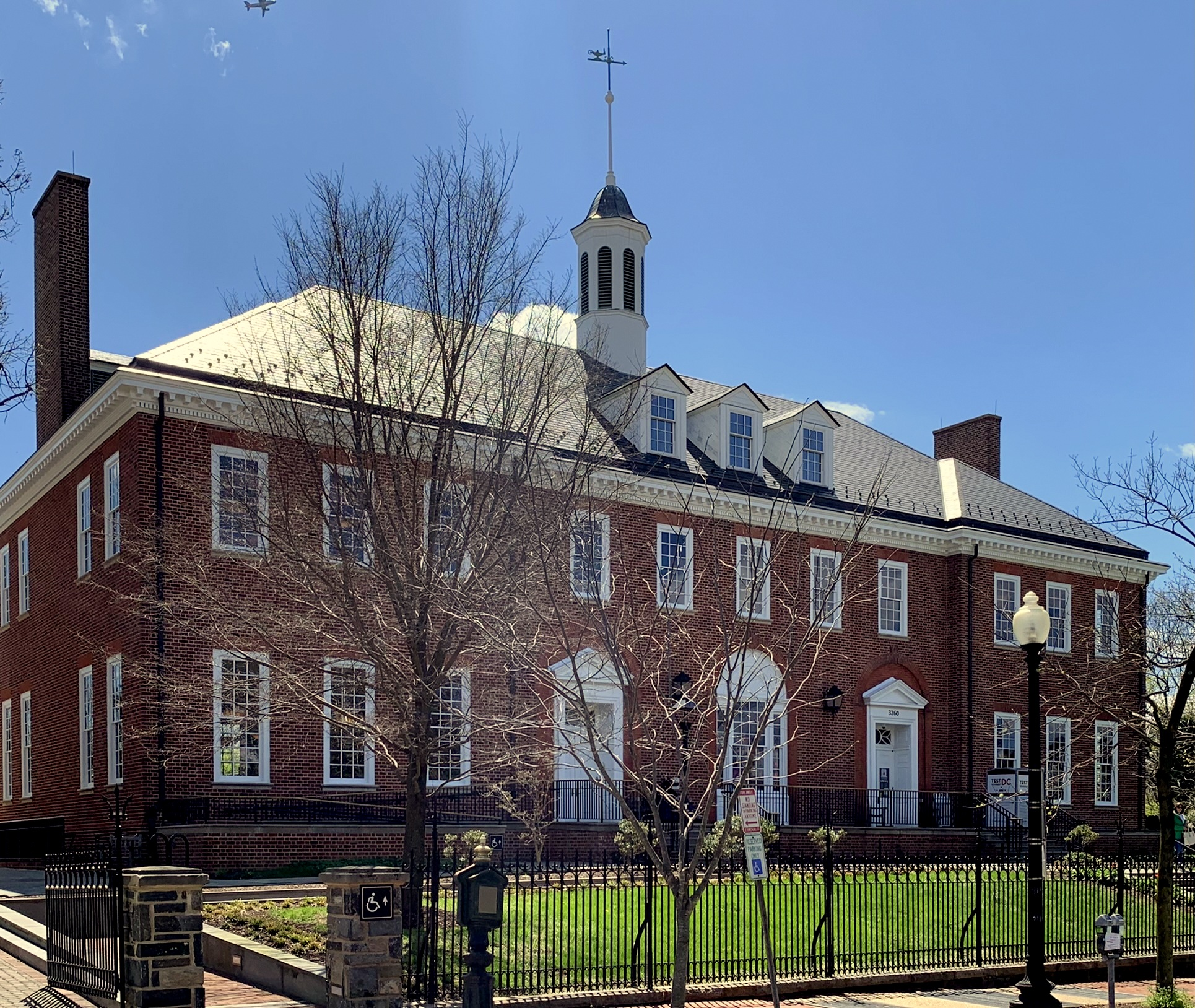
- Colonial Revival facade
- 38°54′48″N 77°03′57″W
- Location: 3260 R St. NW; Washington, D.C. 20007, United States
- Type: Public library
- Established: 1935
- Architect(s): Nathan C. Wyeth
- Branch of: District of Columbia Public Library

Other information
- Website: www.dclibrary.org/georgetown

The Georgetown Neighborhood Library is a branch of the District of Columbia Public Library located in the Georgetown neighborhood of Washington, D.C. Established by an Act of Congress in 1934, the library houses the collection of its predecessor Peabody Library, which was founded in 1872 by a donation of George Peabody. The library opened in 1935 upon completion of the building, designed by Nathan C. Wyeth in the Colonial Revival style. It holds the only collection of materials relating to Georgetown's history in the public library system.

== History ==
The first attempts at creating a public library in Georgetown came in 1867 when the financier George Peabody donated funds to a Board of Trustees of the Peabody Library Association to establish a library for the citizens of Georgetown. The board, chaired by William Wilson Corcoran, invested Peabody's $15,000 donation until March 1872, when they opened the Peabody Library inside the Curtis School on O Street, across from St. John's Episcopal Church. The District of Columbia Public Schools offered them a room in the school free of charge.

Eventually, the library outgrew its location, and local citizens' associations sought to build a larger library. In 1934, Congress appropriated $150,000 for the construction of a branch of the District of Columbia Public Library in Georgetown. A site was selected atop a hill on the corner of Wisconsin Avenue and R Street, the location of the former reservoir. Consequently, the hill and the park that occupies its southern slope became known as Book Hill. The reputed municipal architect for the District of Columbia, Nathan C. Wyeth, designed the Colonial Revival building, whose architecture was designed to blend into the surrounding neighborhood. The library opened in October 1935.

West reading room

The Georgetown Neighborhood Library was renovated to modernize the building in 1976. With the reorganization of the D.C. Public Library system into regions centered on one large hub branch, the Georgetown Library was designated a regional library in 1977. The Board of Trustees of the Peabody Library Association was dissolved in 1979 and donated its holdings to the D.C. Public Library on the condition that they remain in the Georgetown branch. The library maintains a Peabody Room, which houses materials related to Georgetown's history, including the former Peabody Library, and is the only special collection related to Georgetown's history in Washington. This is also the only collection on local history in any neighborhood library in the city.

In 2007, a large fire broke out at the library, severely damaging much of the building and causing the roof to collapse. The fire irreparably damaged some of the library's holdings and artwork, including the historic Peabody collection. Repairs and a major renovation were completed in 2010.

== See also ==
- Georgetown University Library
