= Margaret French Cresson =

American sculptor

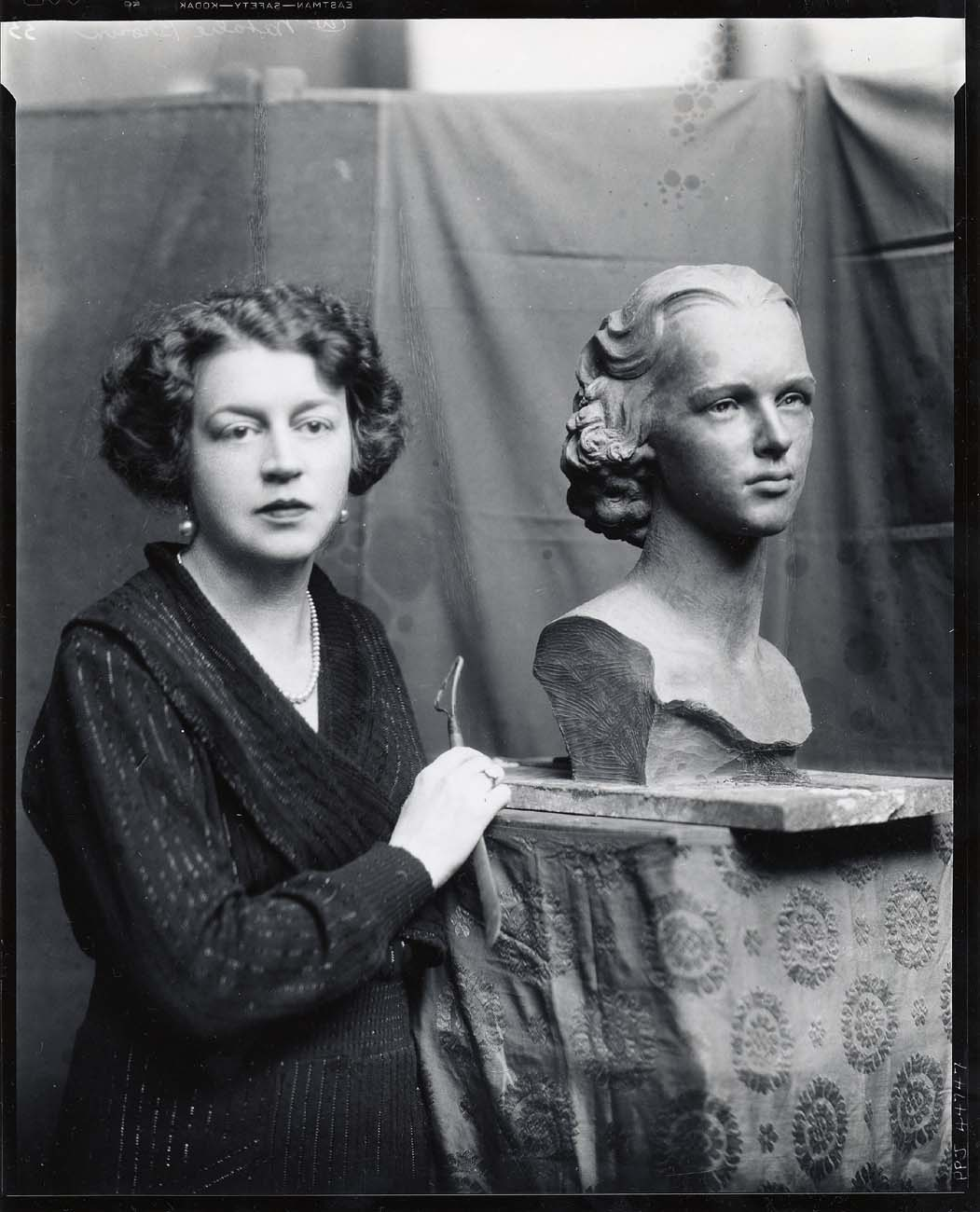
- Margeret Cresson standing beside a bust of Nathalie Osborn.
- Born: 1889; Concord, Massachusetts, U.S.
- Died: October 3, 1973 (aged 83–84); Stockbridge, Massachusetts, U.S.
- Occupation: Sculptor

Margaret French Cresson (1889–1973) was an American sculptor, and daughter of sculptor Daniel Chester French (1850–1931). She studied under Abastenia St. Leger Eberle and George Demetrius, focusing her art on marble busts and portrait heads. Her works were exhibited in Paris, the Corcoran Gallery of Art in Washington, D.C., and other museums and galleries.

Margaret French was painted by many artists who were friendly with her father, and many of these portraits may be found today at Chesterwood in Massachusetts, a property of the National Trust for Historic Preservation. One important portrait, documented as in the house in 1970, is missing, but is known from a photograph. In December 1912, the Swiss-born American portrait painter Adolfo Müller-Ury painted a bust length portrait of Margaret, which was exhibited by him in New York in March and April 1913 after having been donated to the French family that January. In 1942, she was elected into the National Academy of Design as an Associate Academician, and became a full Academician in 1959.

She married William Penn Cresson, an American author, diplomat, and architect in 1921. She is buried in Saint Paul's Episcopal Church Cemetery in Montgomery County, Pennsylvania, along with her husband.
