= Mount Vernon Triangle Historic District =

Historic district in Washington, D.C., United States

- U.S. National Register of Historic Places
- U.S. Historic district
- D.C. Inventory of Historic Sites
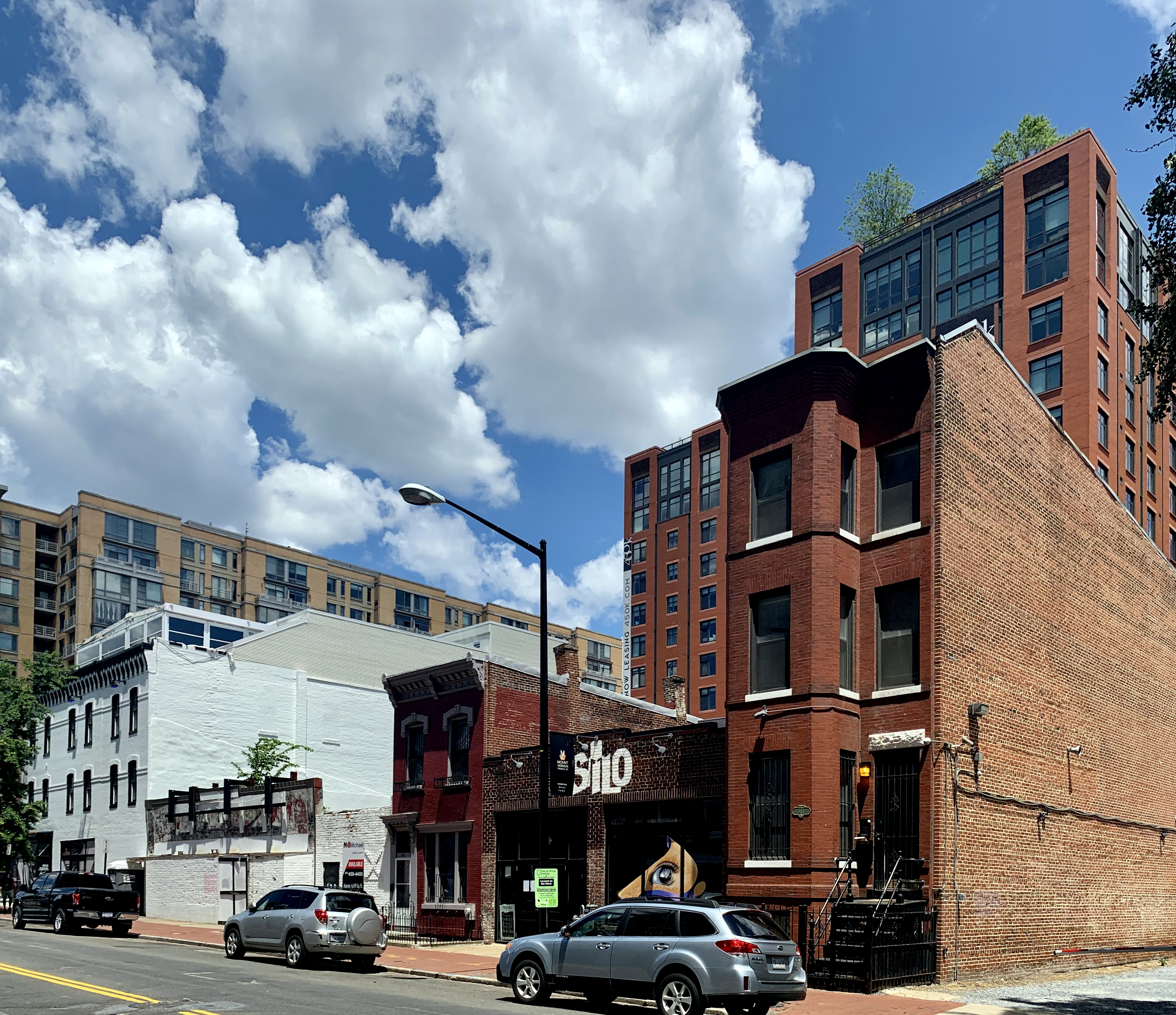
- Buildings on the 900 block of 5th Street NW in the Mount Vernon Triangle Historic District

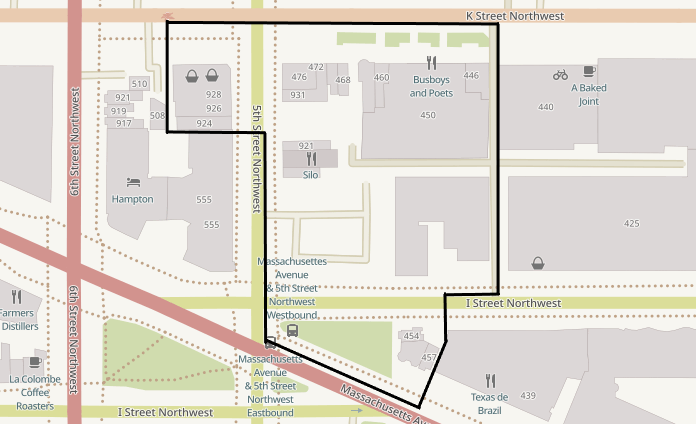
- Location: Roughly bounded by: 400 blocks Massachusetts Avenue NW and K Street NW, Prather's Alley and 5th Street NW; Washington, D.C., US
- Area: 4.4 acres (1.8 ha)
- Architectural style: Italianate, Mediterranean Revival, Queen Anne, Romanesque Revival, Second Empire
- MPS: Mount Vernon Triangle MPS
- NRHP reference No.: 06000191

Significant dates
- Added to NRHP: September 19, 2006
- Designated DCIHS: November 17, 2005

The Mount Vernon Triangle Historic District is a historic district in the Mount Vernon Triangle neighborhood of Washington, D.C., consisting of 22 contributing residential, commercial, and industrial buildings, and one known archaeological site. The area was once a working class neighborhood for mostly German immigrants and home to semi-industrial enterprises such as a dairy and an automobile repair shop. The Northern Liberty Market that once stood on the corner of 5th Street and K Street NW played a large role in spurring development in the surrounding area as did the streetcars on Massachusetts Avenue and New York Avenue.

The historic district was added to the District of Columbia Inventory of Historic Sites in 2005 and the National Register of Historic Places in 2006. The 22 buildings in the district were constructed between 1869 and 1946. Two of the buildings included in the historic designation process, 470 and 472 K Street NW, collapsed in 2014. Many of the buildings in the district have undergone a restoration process. Prather's Alley, which was once lined with dwellings, stables, and industrial businesses, is being redeveloped into a place for community residents to gather.

== Geography ==
The Mount Vernon Triangle Historic District is located in the Mount Vernon Triangle neighborhood of Washington, D.C. The neighborhood boundaries are Massachusetts Avenue NW on the south, New Jersey Avenue NW on the east, New York Avenue NW on the north, and 7th Street NW on the west. The boundaries of the much smaller historic district are Massachusetts Avenue NW on the south, Prather's Alley on the east, K Street NW on the north, and mid-block between 5th and 6th Streets NW on the east. Milian Park, on Reservation 74, is also within the district boundaries.

The majority of buildings in the district are near the intersection of 5th and K Streets. K Street is considered the neighborhood's "Main Street" and the intersection of 5th and K the heart of the neighborhood.

There are 22 contributing buildings in the historic district. They are located on both sides of the 900 block of 5th Street, the 400 block of K Street, the 400 block of I (Eye) Street, and on the 400 block of Massachusetts Avenue. There is an archaeological site on the northeast corner of 5th and I Streets and a strong possibility of undiscovered additional artifacts along 5th Street and I Street. There was one non-contributing building in the historic district when the survey was taken in 2006, 459 I Street, but that has since been demolished.

There are three additional historic sites within the neighborhood but outside the historic district boundaries. They are the Emily Wiley House at 3rd and I Streets, Second Baptist Church on the 800 block of 3rd Street, and the Jefferson Apartment Building on the 300 block of H Street.

== History ==
=== 19th century ===
Prior to the Civil War the present-day Mount Vernon Triangle neighborhood was composed of simple frame dwellings occupied by tradespeople. At the time the area was called "Burch's Hill", named after early settler Captain Samuel Burch who had built a house in the vicinity. The Northern Liberties Market on Mount Vernon Square, built in 1845, slowly increased development in the neighborhood, mostly along I Street and Massachusetts Avenue. The market attracted shopkeepers and tradespeople to live in the area.

In 1872 the market was demolished and vendors purchased a lot on the northeast corner of 5th and K Streets to erect a new a building. The Northern Liberty Market opened in 1875 with 284 vending stalls and had a profound effect on development in Mount Vernon Triangle. Merchants and craftsmen moved into newly constructed buildings near the market. Most of these new residents were German, Irish, and Jewish immigrants, while African Americans lived in alley dwellings.

Several buildings constructed during this time period are in the historic district. The Italianate pair of buildings at 444 and 446 K Street, constructed in 1874, housed working class people, including immigrants from Russia, Austria, Germany, Ireland, and England. That same year the Italianate residence at 924 5th Street was built. John E. Wyess, a prominent German immigrant, built a Second Empire style house at 453 I Street as an investment property. The letter "W" was incised into the window pediment and is still visible today. Wyess rented the building to an architect working for the Architect of the Capitol and a fellow German immigrant, Charles Herman, who lived there until constructing the adjoining house at 455 I Street in 1883. The building at 921 5th Street, known as the Kiefer House, was built in 1878 for German immigrant and tailor Conrad Kiefer. It was most likely constructed by Henry Klinge, a German immigrant builder and contractor.

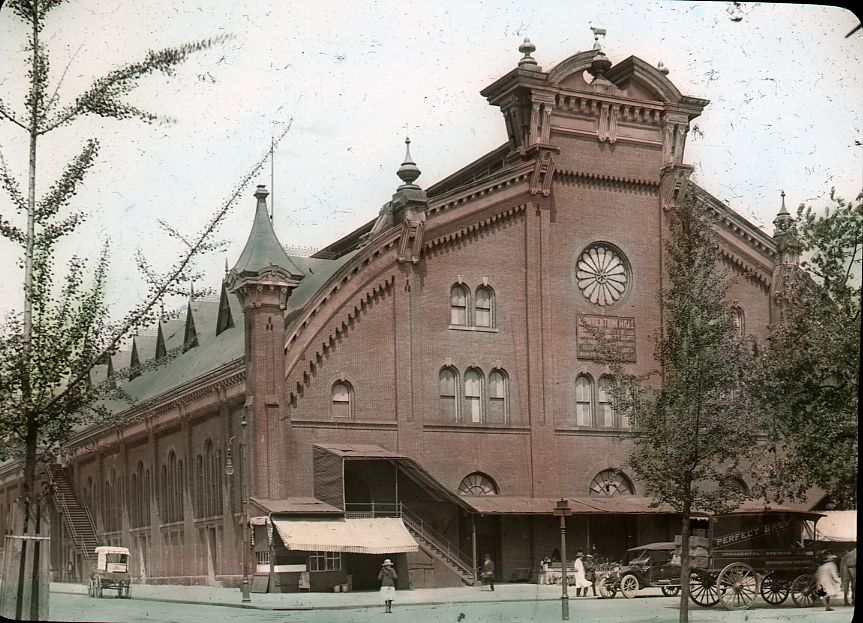
Northern Liberty Market played a large role in the neighborhood's development.

During the 1880s there was substantial improvements throughout the neighborhood and city thanks to Board of Public Works leader Alexander "Boss" Shepherd. In 1884 a horse-drawn streetcar began offering service along Massachusetts Avenue and 4th Street, and four years later, the city's first electric streetcar line was installed on New York Avenue. Even though the neighborhood had access to public transportation, it did not develop like similar areas in the city. Instead of blocks of middle class rowhouses, most of the buildings constructed in the historic district and surrounding neighborhood were single or adjoining homes, light industrial facilities, or small commercial structures.

This decade also saw the growth of commercial activity in Prather's Alley, which is located in the city block bounded by 4th, 5th, I, and K Streets. The alley had been lined with dwellings for African Americans and stables, but during the 1880s several commercial buildings replaced these structures. These included a tinner's shop and a bakery owned by German immigrant Charles Schneider. His business became very successful and would become one of the city's largest bakeries.

The historic district's surviving buildings from the 1880s include an Italianate house at 468 K Street, constructed for Joseph A. Baur in 1883 and designed by John Beha. Baur operated a stove store around the corner at 931 5th Street, one of three adjoining Italianate buildings constructed in 1883 and 1885 by John McDermott, a carriage builder and real estate developer. These buildings, historically known as the McDermott Shops, are on the corner of 5th and K Streets and are considered the most prominent structures in the historic district. In 1887 Charles W. King, a speculative real estate developer, built three adjoining Queen Anne style rowhouses on what was considered a nicer area of the neighborhood, Massachusetts Avenue. The three buildings, 457 and 459 Massachusetts Avenue and 833 5th Street, are located beside Milian Park. King lived in the center building that features a tower until around 1895 and rented out or sold the adjoining properties.

There is one building from the 1890s that is still standing in the historic district. The small Romanesque Revival apartment building at 915 5th Street was constructed in 1892 by Charles Edmonston, a contractor and builder. Edmonston and his nephew Samuel were responsible for building several prominent homes in the city, including the adjoining Hay-Adams House for John Hay and Henry Adams, now the site of the Hay–Adams Hotel, and the Sherman mansion, now the Embassy of Kazakhstan.

=== 20th century ===
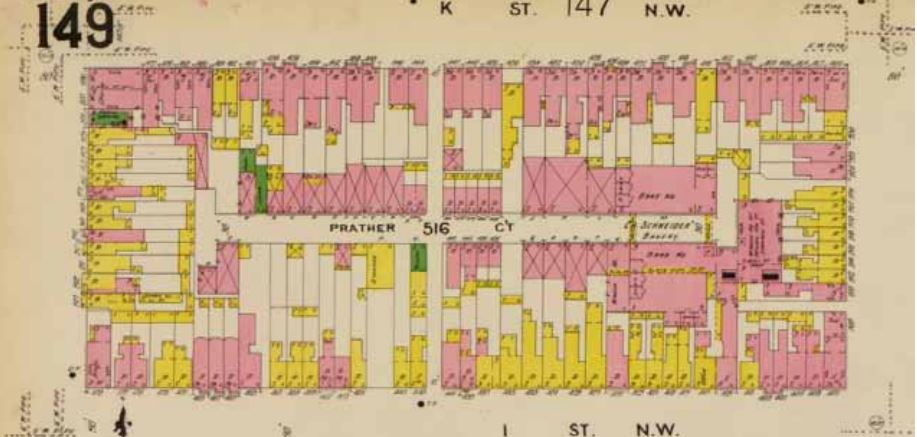
Map of Prather's Alley in 1904.

By the early 1900s Mount Vernon Triangle was home to a variety of working class ethnic and racial groups. Northern Liberty Market continued to flourish and there was a variety of skilled trade services offered in the area. In 1904 John J. Bowles moved his dairy bottling business from H Street to Prather's Alley. He chose German architect Julius Germuiller to design his new 5,000 square feet (465 sq m) bottling plant, where he ran his business until 1925. Bowles lived at the now-demolished 458 K Street and selected Germuiller to design adjoining buildings. The Romanesque Revival 460 K Street was constructed in 1904 and stood in front of his newly completed bottling plant. The building housed workers at his plant unlike the Romanesque Revival 462 K Street, also designed by Germuiller, that was constructed in 1906 and catered to middle class residents. A frame house where 15 African Americans lived was demolished to make way for 462 K Street.

In 1912 William Beuchert, who lived at the now-demolished 430 K Street and owned a stable on Prather's Alley, chose B.F. Snelling to design a blacksmith shop in the alley. Three years later he added a warehouse to the existing structure and in 1919, added an automobile repair shop, Central Auto Works, that replaced a house at 451 I Street. His last addition to the property was completed in 1930 when his repair shop was expanded again. The blacksmith shop, warehouse, and Central Auto Works properties were combined and now appear as one continuous building.

The increase in automobile usage and location between two major avenues resulted in many residential buildings in the Mount Vernon Triangle being demolished and replaced with gas stations and repair shops. This led to some of the remaining residents to leave for a more traditional neighborhood.

After the Center Market on Pennsylvania Avenue was demolished in 1931, many of its vendors relocated to Northern Liberty Market or had to find space elsewhere when there were no vending stalls available. Business partners and Russian Jewish immigrants Morris Wittlin and Samuel Deckelbaum saw this opportunity and chose A.S.J. Atkinson to design a Mediterranean Revival style commercial property containing five storefronts and office space. The Wittlin-Deckelbaum Building, at 500-506 K Street NW and catty-corner to the Northern Liberty Market, offered modern amenities including central electric refrigeration and a temperature-controlled meat cutting sector and was an early example of the supermarket.

The last buildings in the historic district to be constructed were built in 1936 and 1946. J. Edward Fowler selected architect Thomas M. Medford to design the small commercial buildings at 917-919 5th Street and 923 5th Street. James A. Beasley, Jr. ran a poultry shop at 917-919 5th Street for 25 years. Horace Lloyd operated a fish shop out of 923 5th Street but by 1938 it was a clothes cleaning business owned by Daniel Baldomino. The building at 925-929 5th Street was designed by W. Ellis Groben and completed in 1946. The owner was the Union Distributing Company and the building housed a meat market and distribution center. The company operated a storefront in the Wittlin-Deckelbaum Building across the street.

By 1946 many of the longtime residents had left the neighborhood and most of the remaining residential buildings were operated as boarding houses. That year a massive fire broke out at Northern Liberty Market, which had been renamed the New Center Market. Although the market eventually reopened, many vendors left which resulted in a further decline of the neighborhood. Many of the remaining buildings in Mount Vernon Triangle were demolished and replaced with parking lots after streetcar service on New York Avenue ended in 1949. The construction of Interstate 395, closing of the New Center Market in 1963, and destruction of property during the 1968 riots had a long-lasting effect on the area.

=== 21st century ===
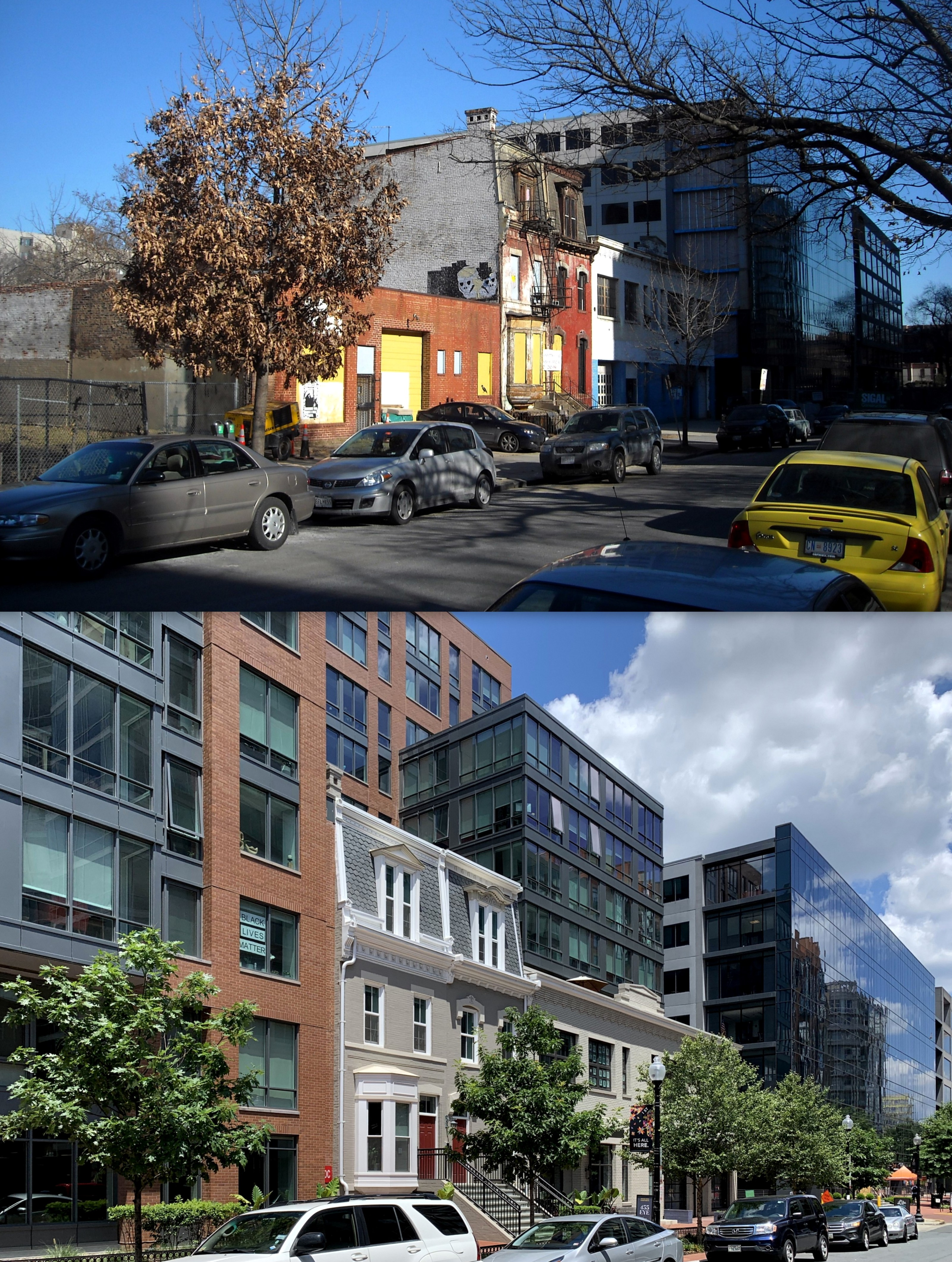
The 400 block of I Street NW in 2010 and 2020. The adjoining houses and former Central Auto Works were restored and incorporated into a new apartment building.

In the late 20th century and early 2000s Mount Vernon Triangle had a reputation for being home to prostitutes, derelict buildings, and parking lots. The old McDermott Shops at 5th and K Streets operated as a strip club. While the Walter E. Washington Convention Center near the neighborhood's western edge was being built, community and local business leaders put forth a plan to redevelop Mount Vernon Triangle. Hundreds of millions of dollars were spent constructing hotels, residential buildings with ground-floor retail, and commercial properties. It was during this time that historic preservationists took note of the older buildings still standing in the neighborhood.

The Mount Vernon Triangle Historic District was added to the District of Columbia Inventory of Historic Sites on November 17, 2005, and the National Register of Historic Places on September 19, 2006. The historic district's nomination form states: "These buildings - the sole surviving, intact collection of historic buildings in an area that is under intense re-development with contemporary high-rise condominiums and apartment buildings - stand out for their historic associations, most readily apparent in the buildings' modest size and scale, in their generally vernacular appearance, and in the wide variety and increasingly rare building types they exhibit. Together, these buildings bespeak the historic character of this semi-industrial/commercial and residential working-class neighborhood."

In 2014, two of the contributing buildings in the historic district, 470 and 472 K Street NW, collapsed and caused damage to the adjoining strip club. The remaining portion of the collapsed buildings were soon demolished. The damage was repaired and the strip club reopened in 2018.

Development continued in the neighborhood and with that, a changing demographic and continued restoration of buildings in the historic district. The adjoining houses and former Central Auto Works on I Street were restored and incorporated into the 455 Eye Street residential building. The former blacksmith's shop was converted into the apartment lounge, the former garage now serves as a restaurant, and the rowhouses contain four rental units.

Prather's Alley serves as a popular shortcut for area residents. To encourage more use of the historic alley, neighborhood leaders proposed turning it into a place where community members could gather. The proposals included a performance space where movies could be played along with art projections, a marketplace with seating and art installations, and a pet recreation area. The winning proposal chosen by area residents was to install a marketplace.

== List of contributing buildings ==
Rating	Image	Address	Year	Style	Comments
Contributing		444-446 K Street NW; 38°54′09.28″N 77°01′03.53″W	1874	Italianate	Originally a pair of residences for working-class people.
Contributing		460 K Street NW; 38°54′08.55″N 77°01′05.78″W	1904	Romanesque Revival	John J. Bowles Dairy Bottling Plant and Associated Buildings. Built as a store for John J. Bowles and to house his dairy workers. Designed by Julius Germuiller.
Contributing		462 K Street NW; 38°54′08.48″N 77°01′05.78″W	1906	Romanesque Revival	John J. Bowles Dairy Bottling Plant and Associated Buildings. Originally an apartment building for Bowles. Designed by Germuiller.
Contributing		468 K Street NW; 38°54′08.55″N 77°01′06.22″W	1883	Italianate	Built as a residence for Joseph A. Baur who owned a store at 931 5th Street NW. Later served as a boarding house. Designed by John Beha.
Demolished		470 K Street NW; 38°54′08.3″N 77°01′06.08″W	1902	Romanesque Revival	Built as a residence for William H. Schluter. Collapsed in 2014.
Demolished		472 K Street NW; 38°54′08.3″N 77°01′06.08″W	1874-1877	Italianate	Served as a saloon and boarding house. Collapsed in 2014.
Contributing		476 K Street NW; 931-935 5th Street; 38°54′08.89″N 77°01′07.81″W	1874-1902	Italianate	McDermott Shops. Several buildings that have been combined. Originally served as residences and stores.
Contributing		925-929 5th Street NW; 38°54′07.35″N 77°01′08.09″W	1946	Industrial	Designed by W. Ellis Groben. Originally housed a meat market and distribution center.
Contributing		923 5th Street NW; 38°54′07.35″N 77°01′08.09″W	1936	Industrial	Designed by Thomas M. Medford. Originally housed a fish shop.
Contributing		921 5th Street NW; 38°54′07.41″N 77°01′08.12″W	1878	Italianate	Kiefer House. Built for Conrad Kiefer as a residence and shop.
Contributing		917-919 5th Street NW; 38°54′07.23″N 77°01′08.12″W	1936	Industrial	Designed by Medford. Built for James A. Beasley, Jr. and housed a poultry shop.
Contributing		915 5th Street NW; 38°54′07.23″N 77°01′08.12″W	1892	Romanesque Revival	Designed by Charles Edmonston. Originally served as an apartment building.
Contributing		500-506 K Street NW; 38°54′08.86″N 77°01′07.81″W	1931	Mediterranean Revival	Wittlin-Deckelbaum Building. Designed by A.S.J. Atkinson for Morris Wittlin and Samuel Deckelbaum. Originally served as a supermarket.
Contributing		924 5th Street NW; 38°54′07.65″N 77°01′08.14″W	1874	Italianate	Originally served as a residence.
Contributing		443-451 I Street NW; 38°54′07.27″N 77°01′04.05″W	1912-1930	Industrial	Central Auto Works. Built in phases as a blacksmith shop and warehouses by William Beuchert.
Contributing		453-455 I Street NW; 38°54′04.56″N 77°01′05.01″W	1876 and 1883	Second Empire	Wyess-Herman House. Built as residences for John E. Wyess and Charles Hermann.
Contributing		457-459 Massachusetts Avenue NW; 38°54′03.89″N 77°01′06.08″W	1887	Queen Anne	King's Row. Built as residences for developer Charles W. King.

== Notes ==
1. There were 24 contributing buildings when the historic district was added to the National Register of Historic Places in 2006, but two of these buildings collapsed in 2014.

== See also ==
- History of Washington, D.C.
- National Register of Historic Places listings in Washington, D.C.
