= The Village Cafe DC =

Coordinates: 38°54′33″N 76°59′50″W

The Village Cafe
- Company type: Privately held
- Industry: Food and Beverage, Community Development
- Founded: 2018
- Founders: Kevon King, Mahammad Mangum, Ryan Williams
- Headquarters: Washington, D.C.
- Area served: Washington, D.C.
- Website: www.thevillagedc.space

The Village Cafe is an American community-based coffee shop and event space located in the Union Market District of Washington, D.C. Since its founding in 2018, the café has operated as a local hub for entrepreneurship, creativity, and social impact, especially among Black-owned businesses and underserved communities in the city.

== History ==
=== 2018: Founding ===
The Village Cafe was founded in 2018 by Kevon King, Mahammad Mangum, and Ryan Williams, three childhood friends and graduates of Woodrow Wilson High School in Washington, D.C. The concept was born from their desire to create a space that blended commerce with community development.

Shortly after opening at 1272 5th St NE, the café began sourcing its products from local D.C. vendors, including Ivy City Smokehouse, DC Urban Greens, and a local coffee roaster.

=== 2018–2019: community programming ===
From its first year, The Village Cafe hosted free community events, workshops, and classes in its back-room event space. Offerings included American Sign Language classes in collaboration with Gallaudet University, children's reading hours in partnership with Politics & Prose, and professional development sessions. The space, dubbed "Lab 1270," quickly became known for incubating local talent.

=== 2020: pandemic response ===
During the COVID-19 pandemic in Washington, D.C., The Village Cafe temporarily closed due to health restrictions. In response, the team partnered with the DC Fridge Collective to host a free community refrigerator providing food to residents in need. The café reopened under health guidelines and saw increased patronage amid the nationwide "Buy Black" movement following the summer 2020 protests.

=== 2020–2022: social enterprise growth and event hosting ===
The café continued to host pop-ups for local entrepreneurs through its "Neighbors" program and expanded mentorship and employment opportunities for D.C. residents. Staff were hired through city programs such as DC Career Connect and Project Empowerment.

The Village Cafe also established itself as a key event host for creative and community-centered pop-ups. Among its notable recurring events is the Get Flee marketplace, which supports local artisans and vendors.

In 2025, the café hosted a collaboration with STRIPT and BUJI Matcha for a Sunday pop-up featuring merch, drinks, and music. The event was promoted on STRIPT's verified Instagram account, which had over 47,000 followers at the time.

=== 2023–2025: expansion ===
By 2023, the café had supported dozens of local ventures and cultural programs. In 2025, The Village Cafe announced its relocation to a larger space on Penn Street NE in Union Market. The new location, expected to open in fall 2025, is designed to support expanded programming, youth development, and business incubation.

During the transition period, the café has continued operating through weekend pop-ups and event-based service.

== Community impact ==
The Village Café has been profiled by the Local Initiatives Support Corporation (LISC) for its community-driven business model and focus on local empowerment."Village DC". Local Initiatives Support Corporation (LISC). 2023. Through its hiring practices, collaborative events, and focus on underserved communities, the café has functioned as a model for socially responsible entrepreneurship in Washington, D.C.
