= Union Market =

Food hall and district in Washington, D.C.

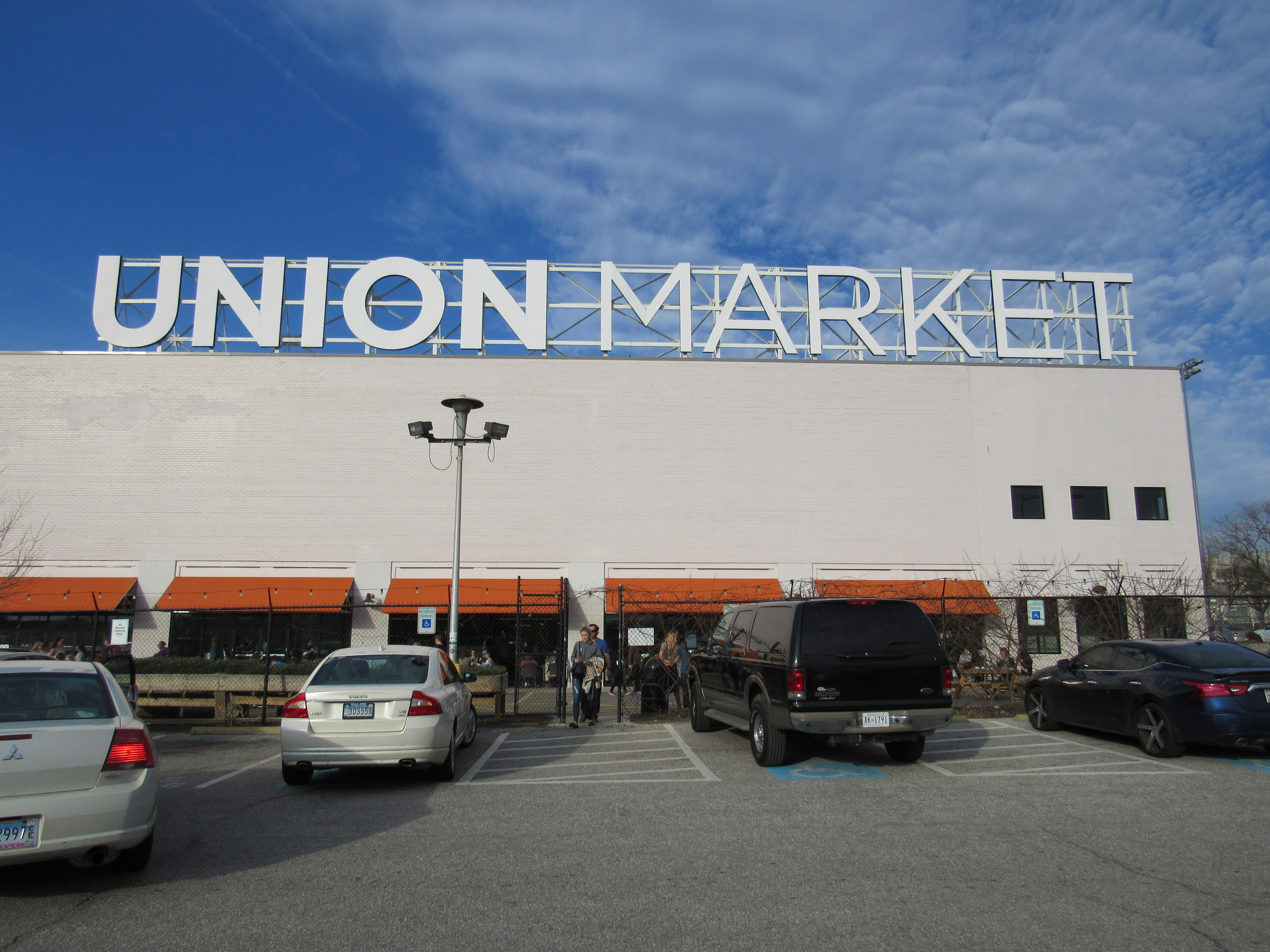
- The Union Market District
- Location: North of Florida Ave NE between 4th St NE and 6th St NE Washington, D.C. 20002, U.S.; Washington, D.C., U.S.; 38°54′30.9″N 79°59′52.9″W
- Opening date: 1931
- Developer: EDENS
- Management: EDENS
- Owner: EDENS
- Website: unionmarketdc.com
- Interactive map of Union Market

Union Market is a food hall located in Washington, D.C. It anchors the Union Market District, a neighborhood encompassing high-rise apartments, office buildings, retail, and entertainment options.

It was formally known as Union Terminal Market when it started as a replacement market center for the old Center Market located near the National Mall in 1931. It became an important part of the Washington food infrastructure to feed a growing city population. It featured retail and wholesales stores as well as a farmers' market which ran into trouble with the city in the 1960s due to its failure to comply with sanitation and safety standards. A new building was completed in 1967 to replace it and is today the food hall carrying the name "Union Market".

After falling into disrepair in the 1980s and 1990s, the area is being revived as a destination for restaurant and nightlife near NoMa and H Street. While for many it is a specific building containing the gourmet food hall, it is in fact an area that today features restaurants, a small movie theater, an ice cream factory and new luxury apartment buildings in Northeast Washington, D.C. off of Florida Avenue NE. These new venues are slowly replacing the old stores that had been the heart and soul of the market.

== Construction ==
=== Planning ===
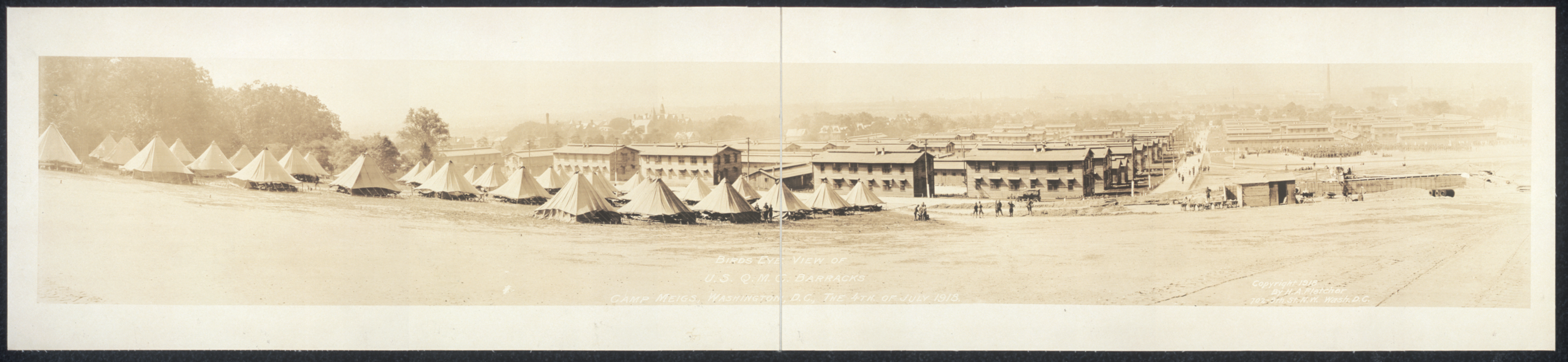
Aerial view of Camp Meigs on July 4, 1918 with the U.S. Capitol (in the background) and Gallaudet College's Chapel Hall (on the left) both visible

A committee composed of Maj. Carey H. Brown, engineer of the National Capital Park and Planning Commission; Lloyd S. Tenny, acting chief of the Bureau of Agricultural Economics of the U.S. Department of Agriculture; C. W. Kitchen, business manager and superintendent of the Washington Center Market, and George M. Roberts, superintendent of the office of weights, measures and markets of the District Government recommended 5 criteria for the selection of a new site to replace

- Proximity of railroad connections to eliminate the cost of handling the food products.
- Readily accessible to the greatest number of inhabitants of the District of Columbia.
- For the farmers' market, seen an essential feature to protect consumers from commission merchants, it must be located so that farmers can easily bring their produce without having to go through congested areas.
- Accessibility of street railways and bus lines heading to different parts of the city.
- Large enough accommodate all the groups which are an integral part of a market center. The building as well parking must be big enough to accommodate hundreds vendors and even more customers.
- The land must be cheap to offer warehouses clustering around the market center.

Two sites were found to meet these needs:

- In Southwest: the area bounded by Walter Street, Maryland Avenue and 12th Street SW.
- In Northeast: the Patterson Tract bounded by Florida Avenue NE, the Baltimore and Ohio Railroad yards and Gallaudet University

The Trinidad Citizens' Association opposed the move of the market to the Patterson Tract and voiced its opposition following the vote by the Citizens' Advisory Council on March 30, 1928, in the District Building.

Union Terminal Market was set up by the Union Market Terminal Company, an organization of commission merchants with some from the old Center Market on the Patterson Tract. The property was located at the intersection of Florida Avenue and 5th Street NE and was originally put on sale on January 1, 1929 by the Phillips & Caldwell real estate firm. The tract of land was used at various times by the military. During the Civil War, it was the site of Finley General Hospital from 1862 to 1865. During World War I it became Camp Meigs.

After 130 years in operation, the beautiful Center Market designed by Adolf Cluss was to be demolished by the Federal Government and be replaced by the National Archives Building as part of the redesign of the National Mall as specified in the McMillan Plan. The farmers gave their endorsement to this bill. Phillips & Caldwell representing the Union Terminal Company on July 29, 1929 announced the new plan to build a $1 million retail and wholesale market center to replace the lost market. It would be built on 85 acres of the Winslow estate. It would be wholesale and retail market. Congress approved funds for a new market in Southwest but this was not seen as enough for the Association.

=== Design ===
Charles H. Tompkins Co. was awarded the contract for nine 2-story market buildings. Permits were submitted and the cost for each building was $132,000. A new $300,000 plant for Joseph Phillips & Co. as part of the market development. Tompkins was to build this too. Multiple permits were issues to many retailers and wholesalers that day. Excavation of the new site started on August 28, 1929 with construction scheduled to start soon after. Negotiations were still under way with the National Capital Park and Planning Commission and the heirs of the tract of land regarding the additional purchase of 42 acres of a park and playground. It seems an agreement had been reached for the purchase for $395,577.18. Six acres of flat land would be developed as a playground and athletic field as discussed for several years. It would be preserved as a national park.

On October 19, more permits were issued to build 25 more buildings. It was estimated that the total cost was $452,000.

The Maryland-Virginia Farmers' Marketing Association made the decision to partner with them on January 16, 1930 in the New National Museum's auditorium and open a farmers market. The Association had been formed in 1929 top represent the local commission merchants and the farmers and represented 1000 farmers. The plan was to allow the farmers to use the tract of land in exchange for a daily fee. The Federal Government had considered purchasing a tract of land to replace the market where they had been evicted but had not yet done so. Some of the vendors had relocated to the Northern Liberty Market located on K Street NW and 5th Street NW. With this new location, 100 to 1,000 farmers would be able to sell there. It was considered to be a more viable location then another proposed in Southwest DC (10th and 11th St SW between E and G Street) as the patrons were not going into this area.

By February 2, 1930, the project was about 75% complete. With enough buildings to house between 600 and 1,000 farmers, it was going to compete with the new project being planned in Southwest. According to the President of the Union Market Terminal Corporation, J.O. Harrison, 42 commission men were planning to move in by May 1930. They represented 80% of the total tonnage of fruits and vegetables being sold in the District of Columbia at the time. On May 10, more permits were issues to build six more buildings costing $40,000.

=== Zoning opposition ===
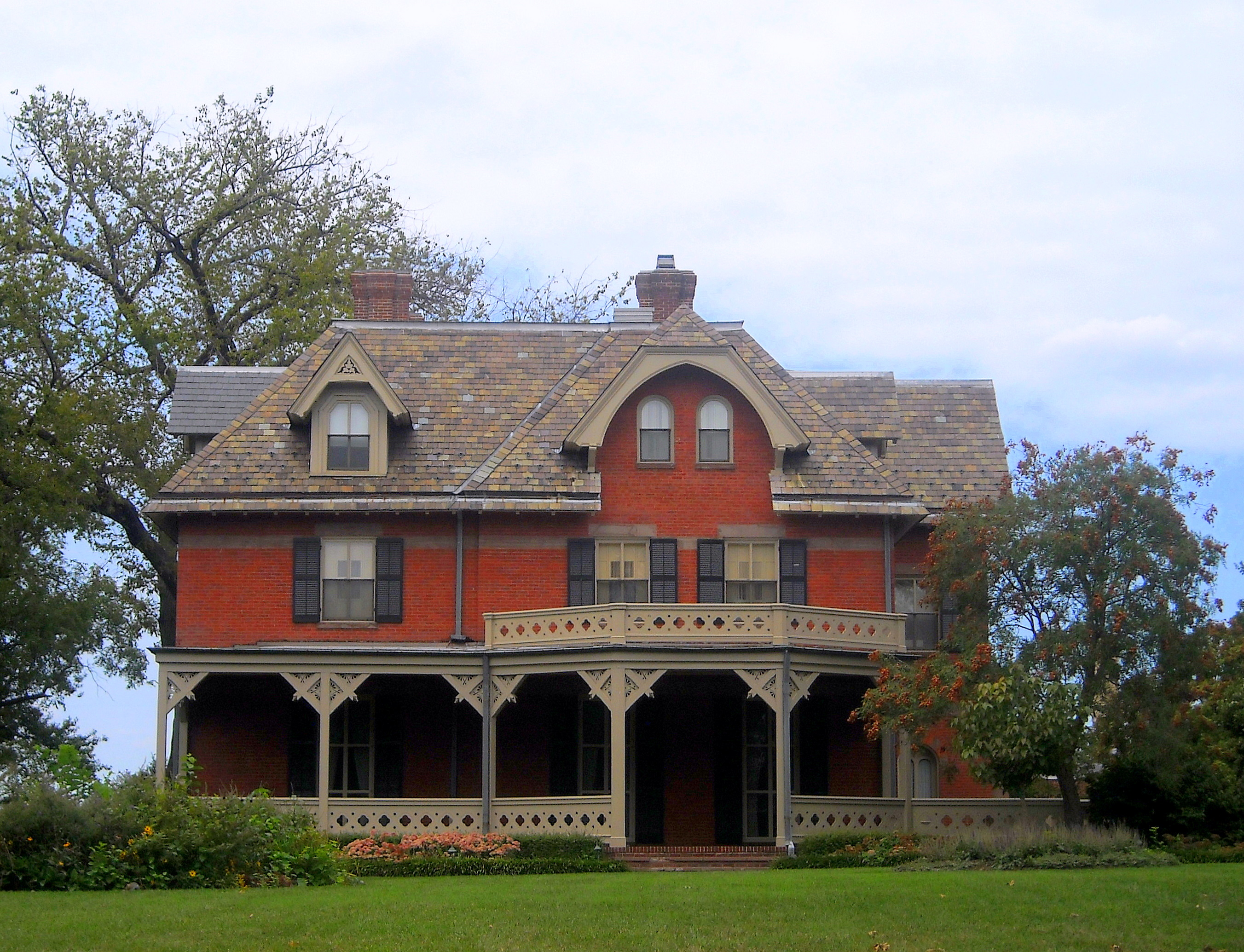
The President's House at Gallaudet University. One of the residential properties located next to the Union Market area that was being rezoned for which Dr. Hall was fighting.

While construction of the 52 building was going well, some opposition was being felt. The Trinidad Citizens' Association met on May 26, 1930 to voice their opposition to the project with regards to the change in zoning. A portion of the land was zoned as residential and the Company wanted to change this to second commercial. According to the civic group, this rezoning would be detrimental to the Gallaudet College and to nearby homeowners. The action was being pushed by the President of Gallaudet, Dr. Percival Hall who also chaired the park and planning committee of the citizen group. His residence was adjacent to the area being rezoned. He argued that the development would "distract from the general beauty of the region" and would bring hundreds of vehicles on Florida Avenue. The area in question went from Florida Avenue and covered the area from 5th Street NE to the property line with Gallaudet College all the way to New York Avenue covering 15 acres. The hearing was scheduled for June 4, 1930 and the market was defending its request by the new buildings were a better option then the vacant lot currently there. In addition, 6th Street was scheduled to be opened providing a buffer between the two properties.

On June 9, the Zoning Commission made a decision on the matter. They ruled that part of the petition would be granted once the property owners dedicated all the streets as listed on the highway plan for the District, including opening up 6th Street NE north of Florida Avenue. The land east of 6th Street would remain residential to act as buffet between the school and the market. This would also preserve the access to the park located being the property. A strip of land on the north side of Florida Avenue was rezoned to first commercial instead of second commercial. This would protect the street from heavy types of commercial structures.

The Trinidad Citizens' Association urged the National Capital Park and Planning Commission to acquire 16 acres of land next to Gallaudet College on June 25, 1930. This would have been on top of the 40 acres already purchased the previous year.

=== Wholesale and retail stores ===
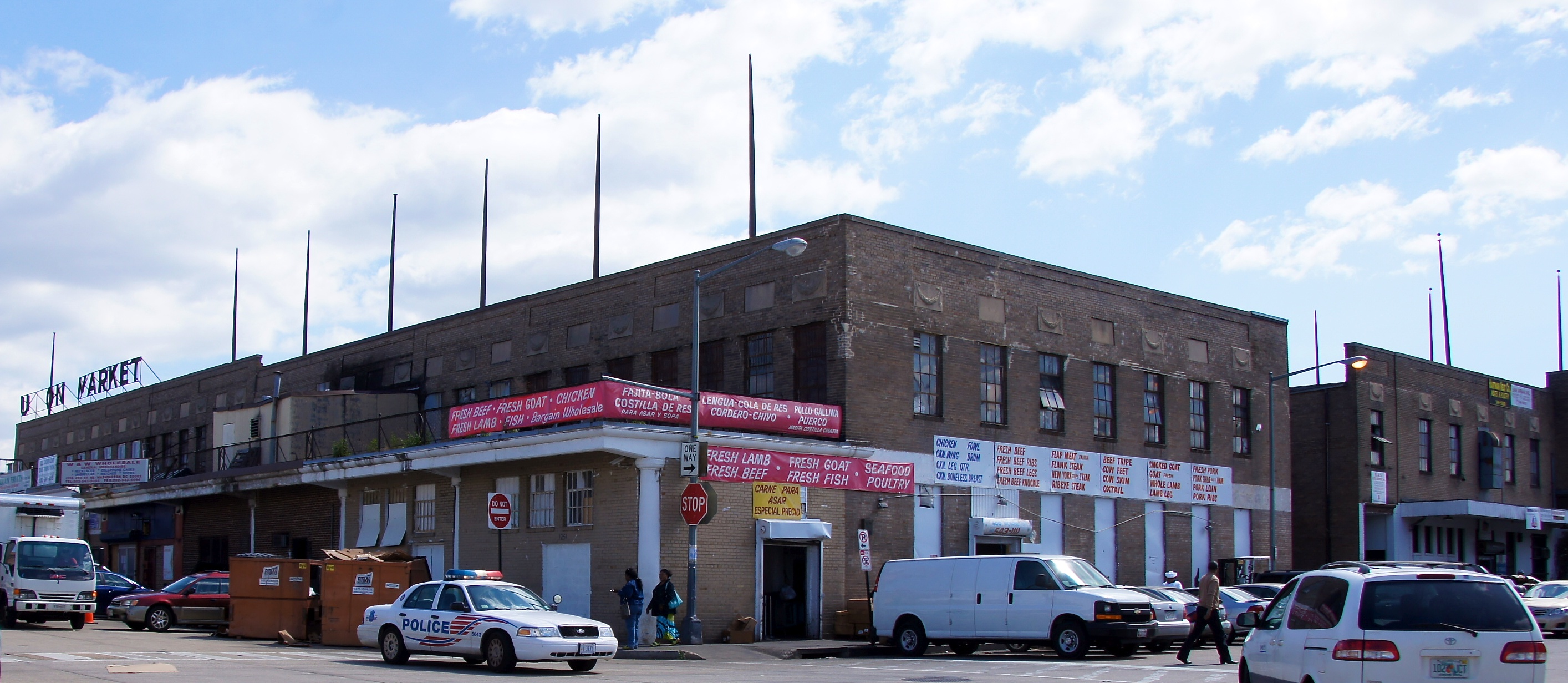
Union Market retails and wholesale stores as they still stood in 2012

The first part of market with it 42 fireproof stores started receiving its first tenants on September 20, 1930. The first one was the Joseph Phillips Co. which moved in its $150,000 meat packing and distributing plant. The facility featured refrigeration equipment using cold air being propelled in storage cambers by fans. All the walls were tiled in white for easy cleaning. The buildings featured long canopies on the front and back of the buildings allowing for extra space outside. Each building was also equipped with an elevator. The streets were designed to allow easy parking for loading and unloading. The streets were 100 feet wide and the alleys 40 feet with large parking areas available.

The first four buildings were completed by that time and receiving their tenants. The building closest to Florida Avenue was to be dedicated to retail sales exclusively. For access to the complex, shoppers would come through Florida Avenue. New York Avenue was not yet finished but under way.

=== Farmers' market ===
However, the farmemrs' market located further north were not yet finished. On February 14, 1931, at a meeting of the Maryland and Virginia Farmers' Marketing Association, 215 farmers applied for 300 stands. A 25 cent fee would be paid by the farmers to be on the line. It was expected to increase once the sheds were built but the goal was not to make a profit but to cover the cost of interest, taxes and sanitation.

A permit for the sheds were issued on May 9, 1931. Located at 1315 5th Street NE, it would be made of steel and cost $10,000. A second permit was issued for a shed at 1314 6th Street NE for the same cost and same specifications on May 23. The extension was officially announced on July 11, 1931. The two structures would measure 360 feet long and 30 feet wide. It would provide enough space for 336 farmers. An additional emergency space was provided to house 165 farmers until these structures are completed. In addition, twelve other stores were going to be built on the site.

On August 4, 1931, the commission merchants had a 9 o'clock breakfast with local officials including Dr. Luther H. Reichelderfer, President of the Board of District Commissioners and Col. U. S. Grant, 3rd director of Public Buildings and Public Parks as guests of honors. The reception was followed with a visit of the new complex.

=== Further expansion ===
Plans for further expansion was announced on October 10, 1931. The one-story brick and concrete building was to be erected for Joseph Phillips Co. and house a provision plant. It was to be located between 1260 and 1264 5th Street NE. Several other stores went up around that period of time including 501 to 529 Morse Street NE at a cost of $110,000 and 1252 4th Street at a cost of $20,000.

On May 14, 1932, it was announced that the construction on the new buildings along Florida Avenue had started at a cost of $100,000. These buildings were owned by Kass Realty Co. and had five stores on the first floor and twenty offices above. Some of the space would be used by the Market and the Market Association.

== Events ==
=== Central Labor Union's Fair and Exposition ===
From June 15 to June 27, 1931, the Central Labor Union's Fair and Exposition took place on the grounds of the Union Market Terminal. The fair was organized to raise finds for the District of Columbia War Memorial. The Fair opened on June 16, 1931 with a speech from Frank Morrison, secretary of the American Federation of Labor in front a large crowd in which he declared that unemployment "must be solved". The United-States at the time in the middle of the Great Depression. He was followed by three other speakers. The attraction was Valencia, an acrobat expert on high pole and the trapeze followed by Beach Bentum and her aquatic troupe. It was followed by a large parade that included floats, cars, trucks and numerous groups.

The next day, a demonstration of anti-aircraft and searchlight maneuvering took place. It was performed by the 260th Coast Artillery, District of Columbia National Guard. A crowd of 10,000 was present to witness it. On June 22, Pauline Firnandow was to be buried alive in a coffin for the third time since the beginning of the fair. She had already been buried twice but had to be pulled out due to the temperature in the coffin reaching 103 degrees. This time she was going to be buried with her husband an attempt to remain underground for 24 hours. He would then be re-buried to attempt to beat his own record of 100 hours and 10 minutes.

=== Sports ===
In 1931 and 1932, the Union Terminal Market was competing in the local Recreation Duckpin League against other local businesses. It is not clear if they did well or not.

In May 1949, The Evening Star published an article about Billy Edwards and his gym located in Union Market above some of the stores. The owner, manager and trainer was a former boxer who was now training the generation of amateur and professionals boxers, both white and black. He was nicknamed locally as the "Stillman of the South" after the legendary Lou Stillman of New York City. The gym had a boxing ring and would see about 75 fighters come through each day to train. On the walls were posters of famous fighters and the radio was turned on all day. Edwards would spend his day coaching the boxers and fixing fights on the pay phone. He always carried a pocket full of nickels for this purpose and smoked a cigar. Billy Edwards had moved his gym from 12th Street and U Street NE and had trained Billy Banks, a black boxer who fought and beat "Baltimore" Joe Soles in the first non-segregated boxing match in Washington, D.C., on June 22, 1940, in Griffith Stadium. Billy Banks went on to be inducted into the D.C. Boxing Hall of Fame in 1980.

=== Circus ===
Prior to the construction of the Union Market Terminal, circuses used the space for their shows. It appears this continued after the construction. On August 2 and 3, 1933, the Hagenbeck-Wallace Circus came to town. In May 1936, it was the Ringling Bros. and Barnum & Bailey Circus who settled there with their menagerie. They returned the following year from May 17 to May 19, 1937. The circus later moved to the Washington Coliseum (formally the Uline Arena) but the animals still came by the Market into the 1970s.

=== Traffic safety campaign ===
The Union Market Business Association endorsed the campaign spearheaded by the Evening Star to reduce traffic fatalities via a pledge to be safe on the road. The death toll due to traffic as of November 23 was of 98. The previous year at the same time, the toll was 114. The vote was made on November 23, 1935 and was unanimous. A drive was undertaken to reach all 700 men and women working at the Market, both employees and employers. The campaign had received 100% support within one week. This represented 110 firms employing 150 trucks and 325 passenger cars. An additional 350 farmers employed 400 trucks and cars in the farmers' market area. With the addition of shoppers, the numbers of vehicles using the space reached 13,143 passenger cars, 3,300 trucks and a total of 35,122 as recorded on a single week day. These numbers would have been significantly higher on Saturdays.

== Post World War II issues ==
=== Strike ===
The market operated throughout the war. Starting on June 10, 1949, it was hit by a strike of the Drivers and wharehousemen of the Union Terminal Market. Organized by the Truck Drivers' Local 639 and the Warehouse Employes' Local 730, they were seeking a 48-hour week with the same pay they receive for a 54-hour work week. This strike was part of a larger wave of strikes that hit Washington, D.C., at that time and involved other professions. The Strike was settled on June 18, 1949 when the 130 warehousemen and drivers voted to accept an offer.

=== Sanitation ===
In December 1960, the Farmers' Market was inspected by the City. It became obvious to the health inspectors that the market was in violation of health and building regulations and had been for at least a year. The District Commissioners immediately ordered the market to clean up. According to the inspectors, there was no sanitary facilities and toilets, there was an insufficient number of refrigerators and some of the meat was being sold out in the open. The responsibility was divided between the owners of the property and the farmers selling there: neither group wanted to invest money in long term improvements. The farmers were very concerned that the market might be closed for Christmas and wanted enough time to resolve the issues.

The market was given an extension on December 15, 1960 until February 1, 1961 to demolish all the unsanitary buildings. Money and a contractor had been secured by the market. However, by August 23, 1961, the issue was still not resolved. The market argued that they were grandfathered into the old code. After many back and forth, an agreement was found between the city and the market. This was delayed by the fact that the ownership of the market was divided in three trustees. A complete overhaul was needed. The owners had started to tear down the more than 100 dilapidated sheds and adjacent structures covering the ground. 35% had been torn the previous week. In addition, the market had agreed to rewire the market and install much needed sanitary facilities. They had also promised to keep it clean in exchange to keeping it open during the renovations.

While there was improvement, cleanliness remained a problem for years. Union Market was facing an ongoing battle to stay out of trouble. On March 6, 1964, the District Board of Commissioners revealed that the Market was in violation of the code. The investigation had started back in July 1963. On July 13, 1964, it was determined that it would cost $100,000 to bring the Market to code but the operators were unwilling to spend this much. According to the city's report, the market had inadequate refrigeration, toilet facilities and washing facilities for hands, meats and vegetables. The shed itself was dirty and without protection against flies. While progress had been made in the previous year according to the operators, it was still not adequate and the Market would need to conform to code like all the other food establishments.

By the end of the year, the issue was affecting three open air markets in DC, including Eastern Market and Union Market. On September 28, 1964, Rep. Charles Mathias (R-MD) visited several markets including Union Market's farmers' market as part of his investigation of the District Health Department's clean-up-or-close-up order. He agreed that the Health Director, Murray Grant was acting appropriately but also urged him to make it easier for stall operators to solve the issues by providing them a detailed list of what they need to do to stay open. He was concerned about this as, while the markets were located in the District of Columbia, some of the operators lived in his district in Maryland. After visiting the markets, the Director announced that only sales of fresh fruits, vegetables and non-food items could be sold. Meats, poultry, custards, pies, home-canned goods and other items currently present had to go due to the lack of adequate sanitary and refrigeration facilities on-site. It was determined that the crackdown in the market could put at least 35 of the 200 lease-holders out of business.

On February 1, 1965, the attorneys for the merchants announced that sweeping design changes had been made in the plans drafted with the cooperation of the Health Department. This included appropriate refrigeration for meat, poultry and eggs and new bathrooms. The delay came from the inability to secure a lease long enough to amortize these improvement but that issue was supposedly resolved.

=== New market ===
By 1965, it was obvious that the old market was not able to adapt to the new sanitation standard in its current setup. A new building was needed. On September 24, 1965, it was announced that plans for a new 250,000 square foot building were ready and that engineering and boring test were complete. The four-acre tract had been acquired by William and Charles Cohen along with Samuel Weinstein at a cost of $900,000 from the Patterson-Winslow Realty Trust. Construction was scheduled to start in the Spring of 1966 and completed in nine months at a cost of $4 million. It would be the largest single structure in Washington exclusively for food merchants and farmers.

On December 16, 1967, the new farmers' market opened on Neal Place NE between 5th Street NE and 6th Street NE. 60 stalls were set up with more than half being independent concessionaires. Thousands of people lined up in front of the market to receive special coupons for free ice-cream cars, 10 cent a dozen eggs, giant penny doughnuts, ground beef and pork chops for 20 cents a pound and 10 cents packs of cigarettes. Mayor Walter E. Washington and Rep. Hervey Machen (D-MD) were present for the opening day "sausage cutting ceremony". They also shook hands and gave out produce out of bushel basket given to them including a chicken who Mayor Washington gave to Mrs. Baron, a mother of eight children.

=== Farmers' market closure ===
An announcement was made on January 3, 1976 that the open air farmers' market that had been operation since 1932 would close. It had become a shadow of itself selling only fruits and vegetables. In July 1975, Gallaudet College bought the two-acre lot located on Penn Street NE between 5th Street NE and 6th Street NE for $325,000. It was to be used for storage of trucks and maintenance equipment. The lot was owned by Historic Figures, the company that owned the Wax Museum in DC. It was leased to a produce retailer named John Spivey would subleased to the farmers. He had retired a few years ago and the lease were coming to an end on December 31, 1959. The College had grown significantly in recent years and needed more space. Some vendors were attempting to get stores nearby but the rents were significantly higher.

DC Councilwoman Nadine Winter (D-Ward 6) told college officials she was in favor of the city purchasing the market in order to prevent the shut-down on January 8. However, Edward C. Merrill Jr., President of Gallaudet College responded that the land was needed for storage but said he was open to alternatives. On January 15, the college announced that it would let vendors continue to operate for the time being. The agreement reached on January 13 stated that the extension would be for two or three years approximately and only half of the space due to the dwindling number of vendors. The college would use the western half as it only 50 vehicles but would need all of it once it expends to 100 vehicles in a few years.

== Today ==
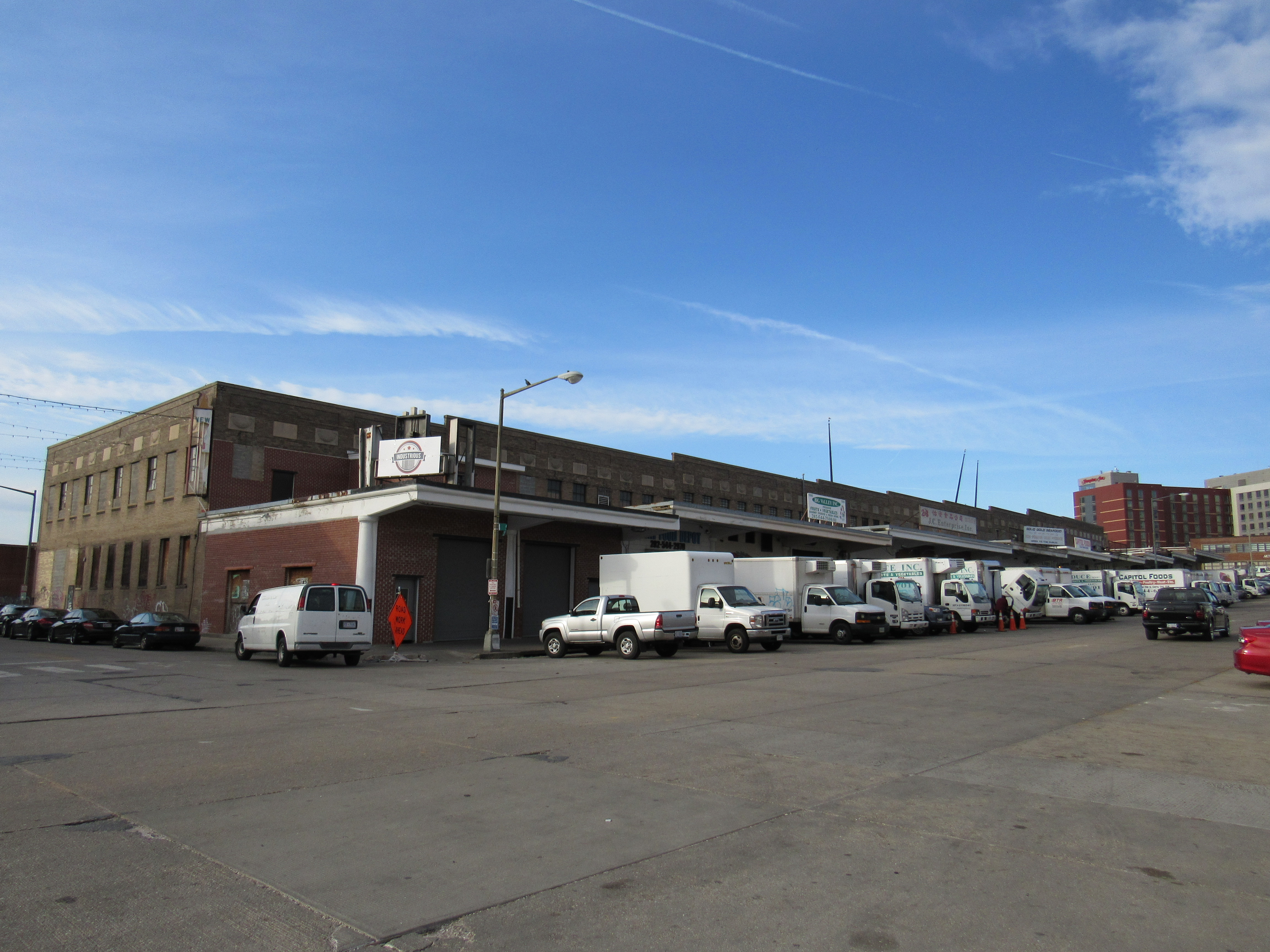
The Union Market buildings as they still stood in 2017

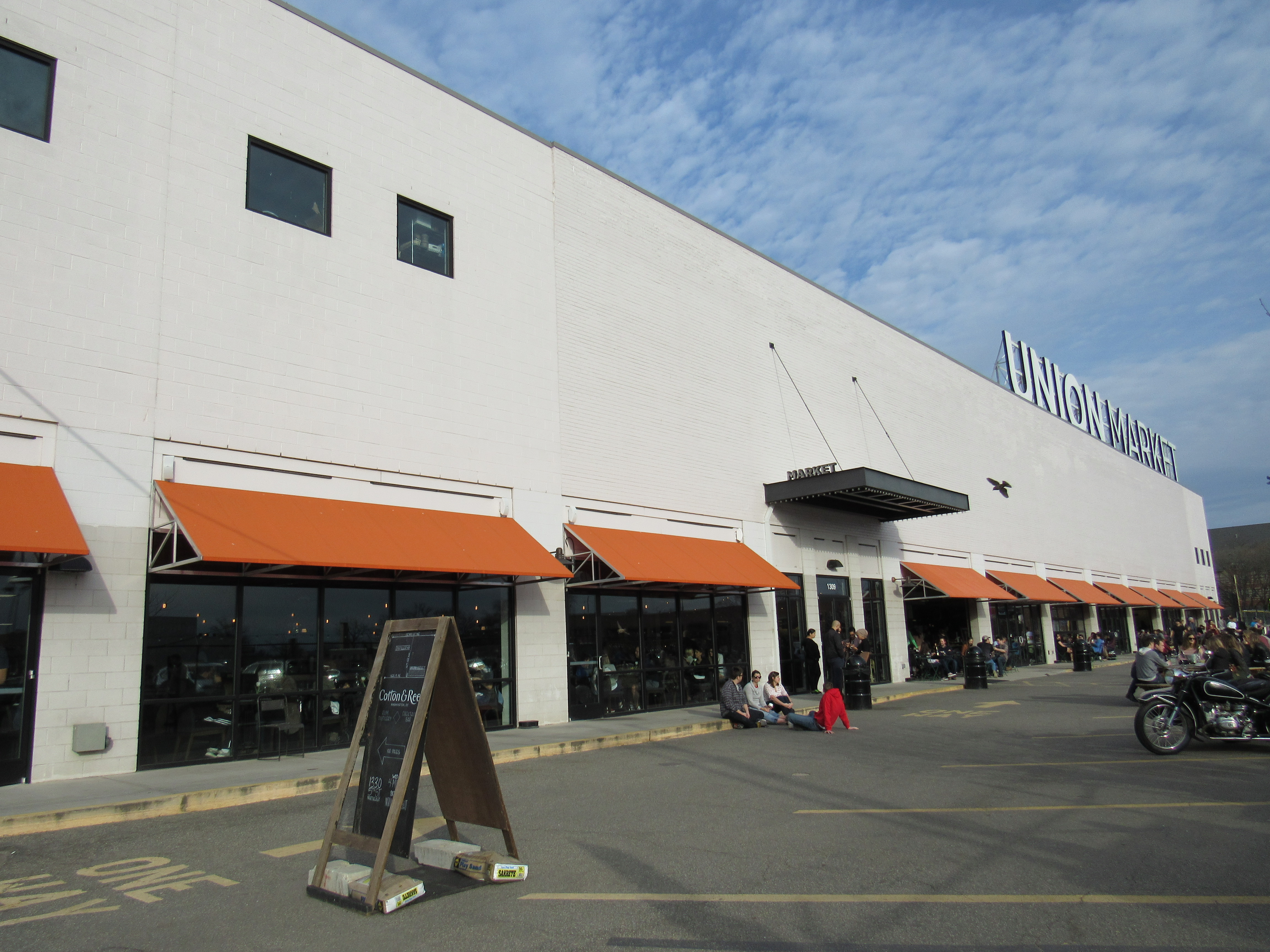
The front facade of Union Market in 2017

Today, the name Union Market is used by both the food hall located between 5th Street and the entire area between Florida Avenue NE, New York Avenue NE and 6th Street NE. This name sometimes overlaps with the name NoMa. The area had been going through a revitalization that follows the trend of NoMa with the renovation of the Uline Arena. What was once a low income retail area is becoming an upscale residential and entertainment area.

=== Food hall ===
Bon Appétit called it one of the 5 best food halls in the United States.

Union Market is owned by EDENS, a national retail real estate developer. EDENS has proposed building office space and homes above the existing market; the project was approved in 2015, and EDENS requested a two-year extension in 2017.

The Washington Post has written that the "once-scruffy" Union Market "has become a mecca for foodies from around the D.C. area and is a centerpiece for a revitalized neighborhood set to expand with numerous residential options." A 187-unit, six-story apartment building, the Edison at Union Market, opened in 2017. Construction of another development nearby, the 318-unit, 12-story Highline, began the same year.

As of 2017, the food hall housed 48 vendors. The "mostly local vendors" sell "gelato, olive oil, oysters and other specialties" and the market is "an upscale retail presence in the warehouse district between Florida and New York avenues."

In September 2017, a new large-scale mural was installed on the side of the building along 6th Street. The artwork by Yoko Ono was the inaugural project of Hirshhorn in the City which hopes to exhibit international contemporary artists in Washington, D.C. The artwork is a white wall with the following words in capital letters:

“RELAX. YOUR HEART IS STRONGER THAN WHAT YOU THINK!”

=== Retail stores ===
Several of the old buildings have been demolished and replaced since 2010. The new Edison Building opened in 2017 at the intersection of Florida Avenue NE and 4th Street NE with a Trader Joe's on the ground floor. Some of the small stores are being converted to restaurants such as St. Anselm, a steakhouse and O-Ku DC, a sushi bar.

=== World TeamTennis ===
In 2019, the Washington Kastles of World TeamTennis announced they would play outdoors on the roof of the Union Market. From 2014–2018, they played at the Charles E. Smith Center.

== See also ==
- Center Market
- Northern Liberty Market
- Maine Avenue Fish Market
- District Grocery Stores
- Finley General Hospital
