= Mount Vernon Triangle =

Neighborhood of Washington, D.C., United States

- Neighborhood of Washington, D.C.
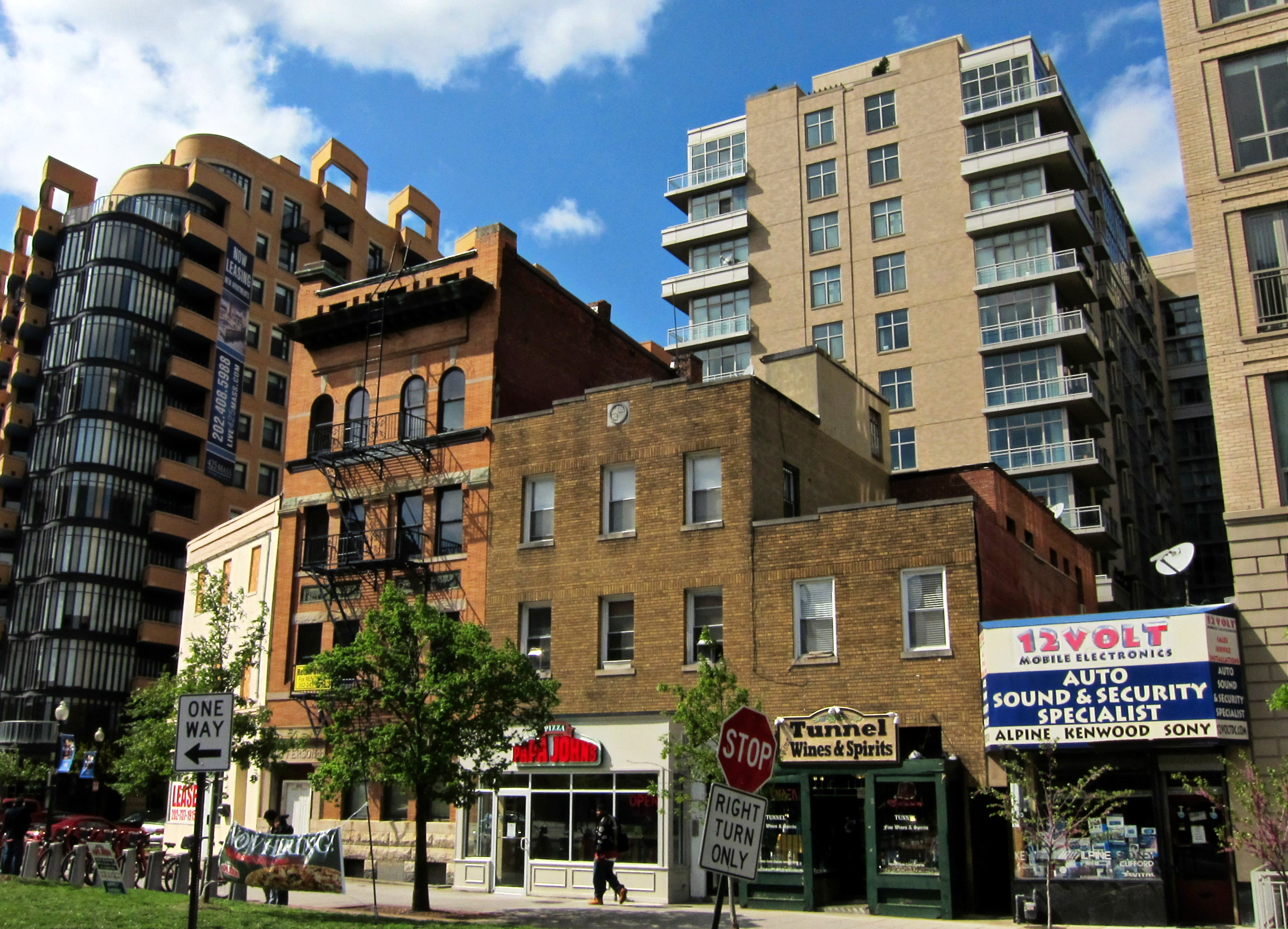
- The 300 block of H Street NW in Mount Vernon Triangle

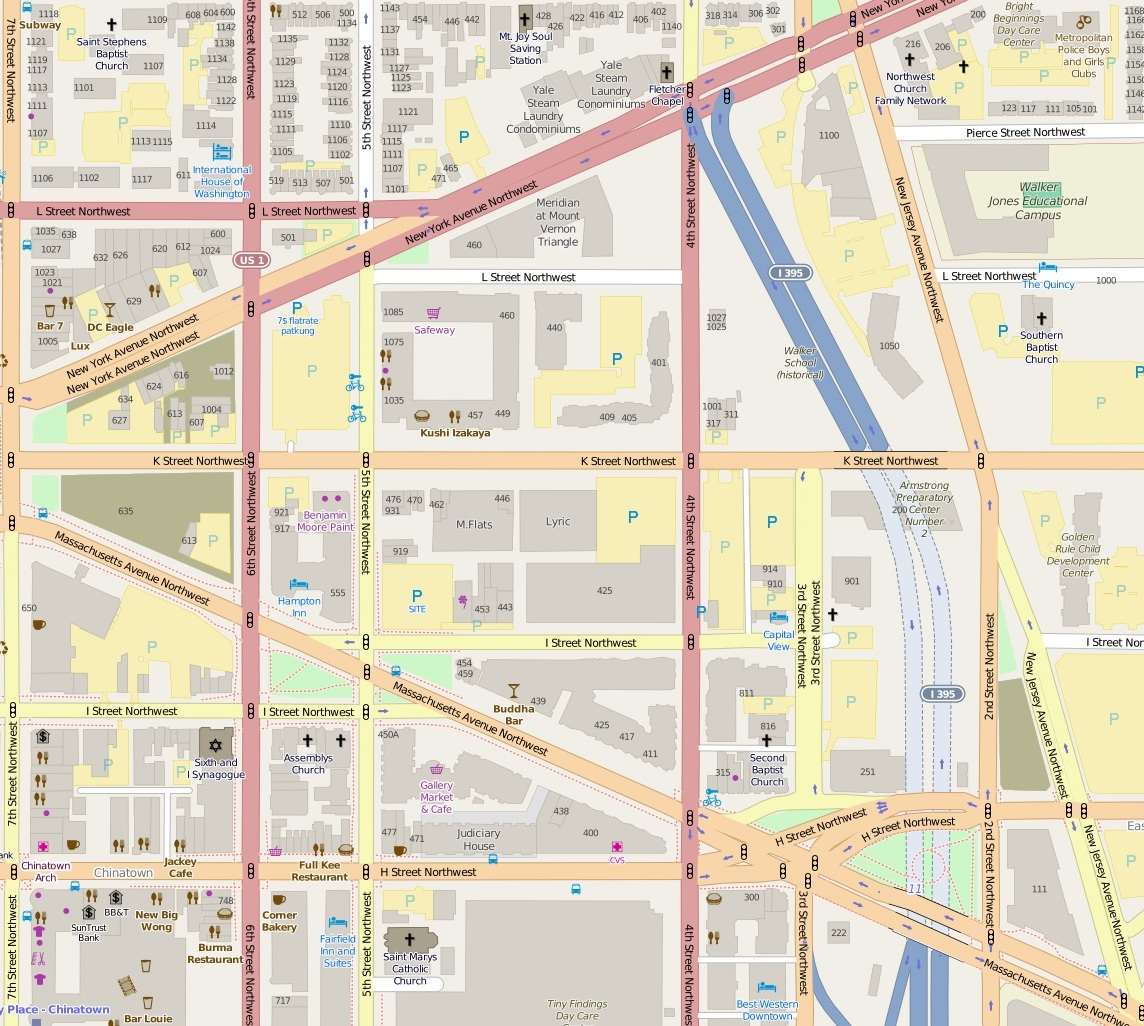
- Coordinates: 38°54′09″N 77°01′04″W
- Country: United States
- District: Washington, D.C.
- Ward: Ward 6

Government
  - Councilmember: Charles Allen

Population (2011)
  - Total: 2,840
- Postal code: ZIP code

Mount Vernon Triangle is a neighborhood and community improvement district in the northwest quadrant of Washington, D.C. The neighborhood is located adjacent to Mount Vernon Square. Originally a working-class neighborhood established in the 19th century, present-day Mount Vernon Triangle experienced a decline in the mid-20th century as it transitioned from residential to commercial and industrial use.

The neighborhood has undergone significant and rapid redevelopment in the 21st century. It now consists mostly of high-rise condominiums, apartment and office buildings. Several historic buildings in the neighborhood have been preserved and are listed on the National Register of Historic Places. Mount Vernon Triangle is now considered a good example of urban planning and a walkable neighborhood.

== Geography ==
Mount Vernon Triangle, consisting of 17 blocks, is in Ward 6 and the 20001 ZIP code. The triangular neighborhood is bordered by:

- 7th Street and Mount Vernon Square and Downtown on the west,
- Massachusetts Avenue and the Judiciary Square neighborhood on the south,
- New Jersey Avenue and the Sursum Corda and NoMa neighborhoods on the east
- New York Avenue and the Shaw neighborhood on the north

K Street is considered to be the neighborhood's "Main Street", with the intersection of 5th and K Streets acting as a "community focal point and heart of the neighborhood."

== History ==
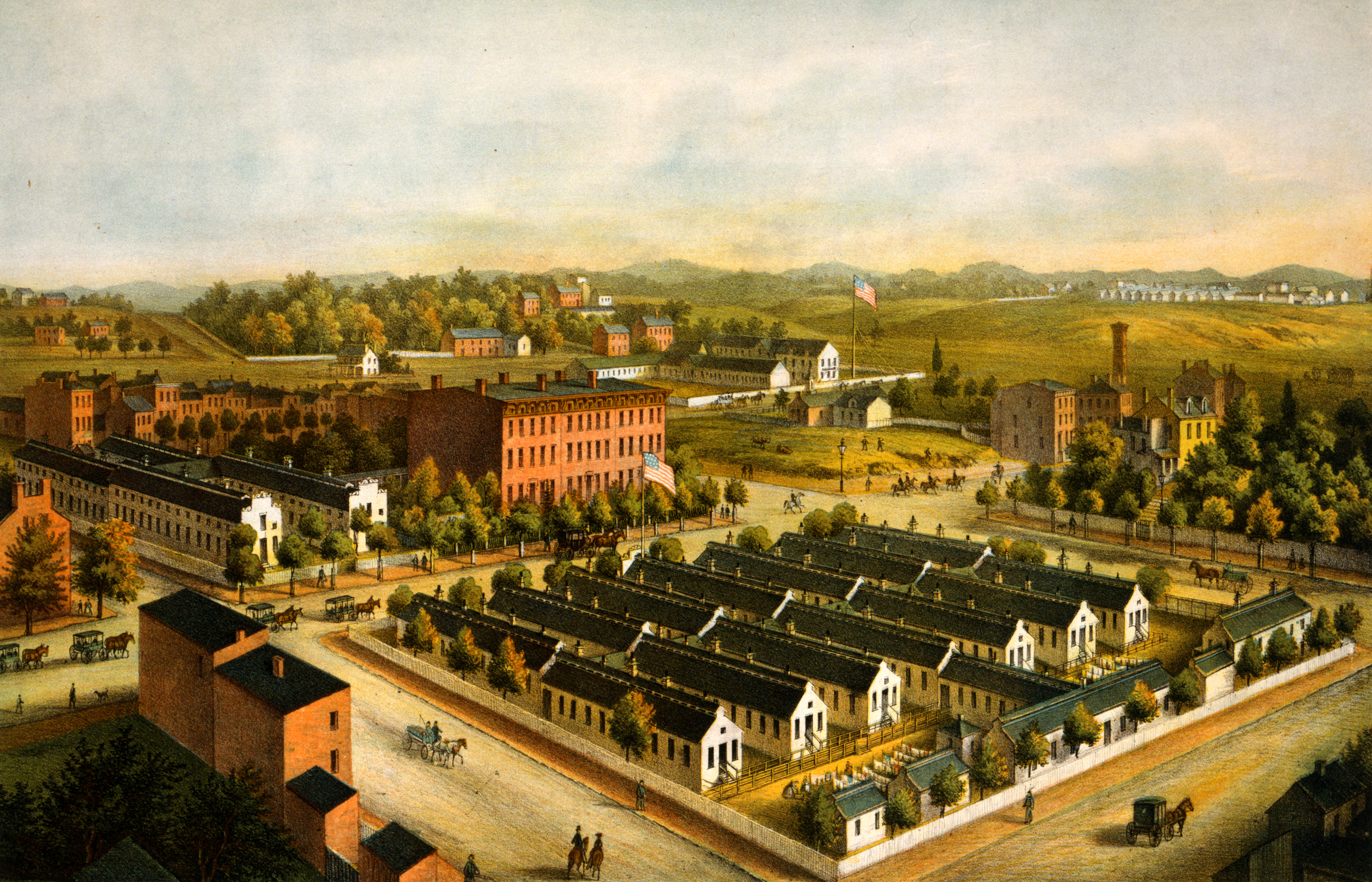
1864 lithograph of Douglas Row and Stanton Hospital

Present-day Mount Vernon Triangle was featured on the L'Enfant Plan for the city, although it was north of the populated areas at the time and remained largely unsettled. In 1810, Congress chartered the 7th Street Turnpike, an extension of 7th Street that ran from Center Market (National Archives Building present site) to the Maryland border. This led to some minor development in the area, although prior to the Civil War, most of the residences consisted of only modest frame dwellings. The exception was Douglas Row, three large homes built in 1856 by two senators and Vice President John C. Breckinridge. Douglas Row was used as a hospital during the Civil War and served as the residence of notable figures after the war concluded, including Ulysses S. Grant and William Tecumseh Sherman. Stanton Hospital, one of the city's largest temporary hospitals during the war, was located in the neighborhood, across the street from Douglas Row.

The rapid growth of the neighborhood was spurred by the 1875 opening of the Northern Liberty Market, a large public market with 284 vending stalls that stood at 5th and K Streets NW. As the population grew, older dwellings were replaced with permanent brick homes and businesses and the demographics changed dramatically. German, Irish and Jewish immigrants moved to the neighborhood and opened shops. African Americans also moved to the area, though they tended to live in alley dwellings.

In addition to the Northern Liberty Market, the neighborhood experienced rapid growth due to improvements made by the Board of Public Works led by Alexander "Boss" Shepherd and the installation of streetcars. Horse-drawn streetcars began service on the neighborhood portion of Massachusetts Avenue and 4th Street in 1884 while Washington, D.C.'s first electric streetcar line began operating on New York Avenue in 1888. The transportation options and proximity to downtown led to speculative development in the neighborhood, though middle-class rows of houses were not built, unlike most neighborhoods in the area. In addition to residential and commercial development, there was an active industrial center in the neighborhood, centered around Prather's Alley (located between 4th and 5th and I and K Streets). In the late 19th century and early 20th century, buildings and stables on Prather's Alley were demolished or converted into bakeries, a dairy bottling plant, warehouses and other industrial facilities.

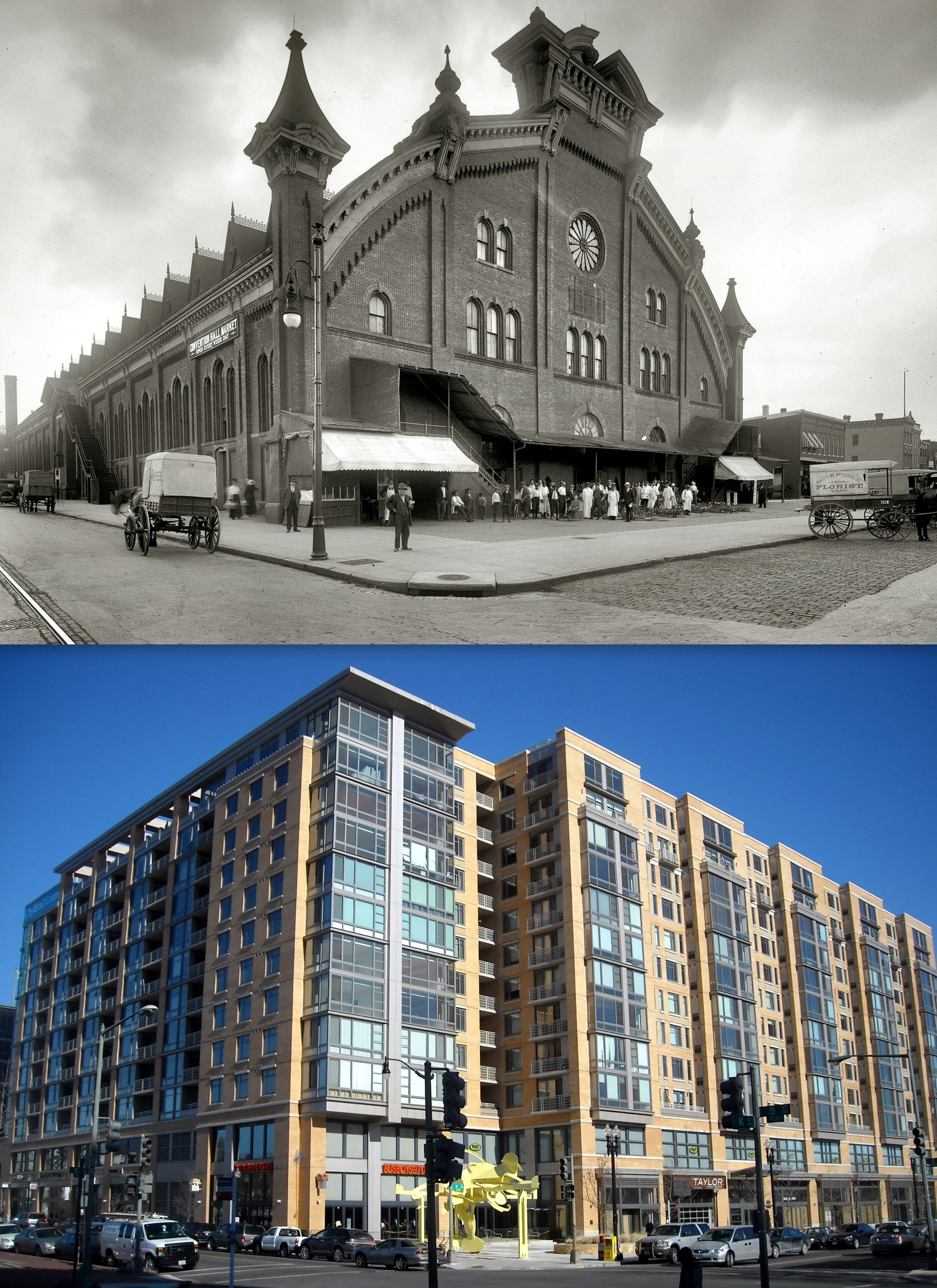
The Northern Liberty Market (in 1920) and CityVista (in 2010) on the same corner.

Commercial development increased in the neighborhood in the 1910s and 1920s. Increased traffic on New York Avenue resulted in the addition of gas stations, garages and car repair shops, many of which replaced residential buildings. By 1930, Northern Liberty Market (called Center Market at the time) was under threat of closing and demolition. A new and modern building for vendors was built on the opposite corner. As the number of commercial and industrial businesses increased, many residents moved elsewhere. Many homes became boarding houses for poor residents, a trend that significantly increased following World War II.

In 1946, a fire destroyed much of Center Market, resulting in many local businesses supported by the market to close or move to other parts of the city. The streetcar on New York Avenue was removed in 1949 and many of the residential buildings along that road were demolished and replaced with parking lots. In the 1960s, a large portion of the neighborhood's eastern section, including the remaining portion of Douglas Row, was demolished to make room for Interstate 395. During the 1968 riots that followed the assassination of Martin Luther King Jr., several buildings on the west side of Mount Vernon Triangle were burned. By the 1980s, much of the neighborhood was decrepit, consisted of large parking lots and had become a haven for prostitutes and drug dealers.

Redevelopment of large areas of Mount Vernon Triangle began in the 21st century as more people moved into the city and local government officials offered tax abatement for residential construction. City officials and real estate developers began to push for revitalization of the area in 2000.

The Mount Vernon Triangle Community Improvement District, a nonprofit that coordinates and markets the community improvement district, was established in 2004. The turning point for Mount Vernon Triangle was the 2008 completion of the neighborhood's largest development, CityVista, a complex consisting of 441 condominium units, 224 apartments, and retail space. There was a decline in construction during the Great Recession, but development has since resumed. As of 2011, the neighborhood had an estimated population of 2,840, consisting of mostly young professionals.

The Washington Post has described the neighborhood as a "vibrant, thriving urban center" and "a textbook example of urban planning and design, connectivity among people, and walkability." In 2014, there were 3,691 condominium units, 2,607 apartments, 40 restaurants, and 1.7 million sq ft (160,000 m^{2}) of office space either built or under construction in the neighborhood. Focal points of business on 5th Street include a 24-hour Safeway grocery store and Busboys and Poets.

Two outdoor sculptures, Lift Off and Inspiration, were installed on the corner of 5th and K Streets in 2009 and 2010, respectively.

=== Historic properties ===
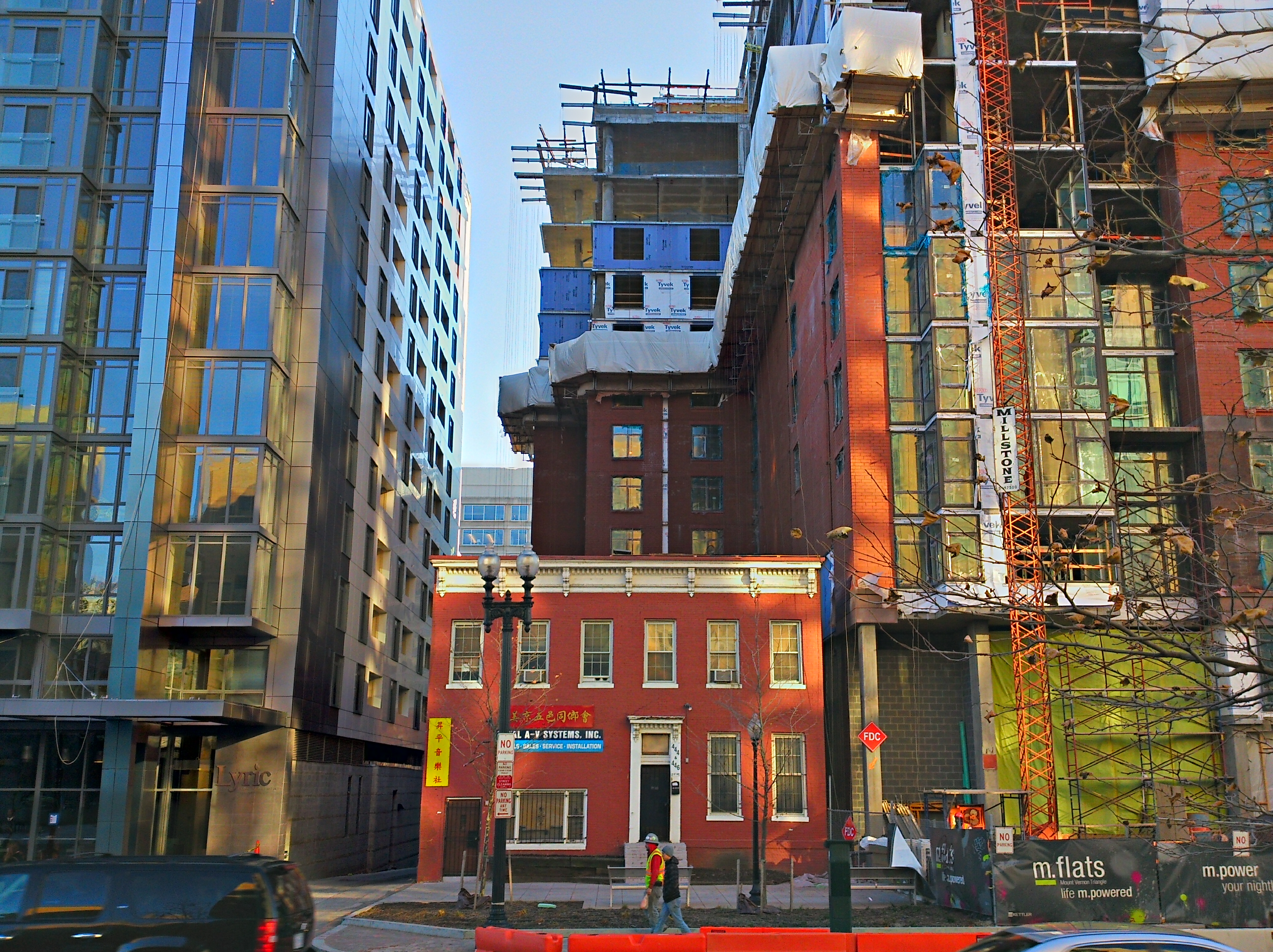
444-446 K Street NW, contributing properties to the Mount Vernon Triangle Historic District, surrounded by new apartment and condominium buildings.

There are several 19th and early 20th century buildings in the neighborhood which have been preserved and restored. The Mount Vernon Triangle Historic District, originally composed of 24 buildings mostly located between 4th and 5th and I and K Streets, was listed on the National Register of Historic Places (NRHP) in 2006. Two of the buildings, 470 and 472 K Street NW, collapsed in 2014.

The Emily Wiley House, completed in 1871, is a former townhouse located at 3rd and I Streets NW that was listed on the NRHP in 2006. The Jefferson Apartment Building, built in 1899 and designed by local architect George S. Cooper, is located at 315 H Street NW and was listed on the NRHP in 1994. Second Baptist Church, built in 1894 on the site of the church's former 1856 property, is located at 816 3rd Street NW and was listed on the NRHP in 2004.

== Public services ==
Several public transportation options are available for neighborhood residents and visitors. There are three Metro stations within short walking distance: Gallery Place, Judiciary Square, and Mount Vernon Square. The DC Circulator's Georgetown-Union Station route runs along Massachusetts Avenue and there are several Metrobus stops throughout the neighborhood. Three Capital Bikeshare stations are also located in the neighborhood.

Elementary and middle school students attend Walker-Jones Education Campus, which lies on the eastern boundary of the neighborhood. Older students attend Dunbar High School in nearby Truxton Circle.

There are several pocket parks in Mount Vernon Triangle: two at 7th and K Streets, Cobb Park (2nd Street and Massachusetts Avenue), Milian Park (5th and I Streets) and Seaton Park (500 block of Massachusetts Avenue). Most of these parks are small triangular lots sited between busy streets and intersections. Local advocates are pursuing a larger public space and "urban park for passive pursuits, including strolling, reading, and sitting."

== See also ==
- Neighborhoods in Washington, D.C.
