= Inspiration (sculpture) =

Public sculpture by Ethan Kerber

- Artist: Ethan Kerber
- Year: 2010
- Type: Metal
- Dimensions: 7.6 m × 7.6 m (25 ft × 25 ft)
- Location: Washington, D.C., U.S.; 38°54′10.42″N 77°1′8.01″W
- Owner: D.C. Commission on the Arts and Humanities

Inspiration is a public artwork by American artist Ethan Kerber, located at a commercial building at the intersection of 5th St NW & K St NW in the Mount Vernon Triangle neighborhood of Washington, D.C., United States. Inspiration was created through DC Commission on the Arts and Humanities.

== Description ==
This metal sculpture is placed on an air intake vent on the facade of the CityVista building just north of Busboys and Poets. At 25 feet by 25 feet; it consists of five panels which are made up of 80 custom CNC plasma cut metal sheets. It weighs about 3,500 pounds. Painted in shades of blue, the design represents exhaled breath on a cold day.

== Artist ==
A Masters student at San Francisco State University, Ethan Kerber was raised in New York City. Working primarily with metal his work is inspired by the street art that he saw throughout the city as a youth. Kerber describes his art as "a reflection in metal of the urban environment around us." His work is seen also at the Oakland Zoo. He works under the name Midnight Metal Works Inc.

== Acquisition ==
In 2009 the DC Commission on the Arts & Humanities, DC Office of Planning, CityVista and the Mount Vernon Triangle Community Improvement District selected Kerber to create a "dynamic" installation for an exterior wall at CityVista. The sculpture was installed on March 1, 2010.

== Information ==
Inspiration was created using three-dimensional modeling software. Kerber worked closely with architects and engineers to use digital design to create an efficient and creative work. The final image was programmed into a plasma cutter which precisely cut the image. According to Kerber, the title "Inspiration" refers to "the source of creativity as well as the functional role in relation to the building's system of breathing."

== See also ==
- List of public art in Washington, D.C., Ward 2
