= Northern Liberty Market =

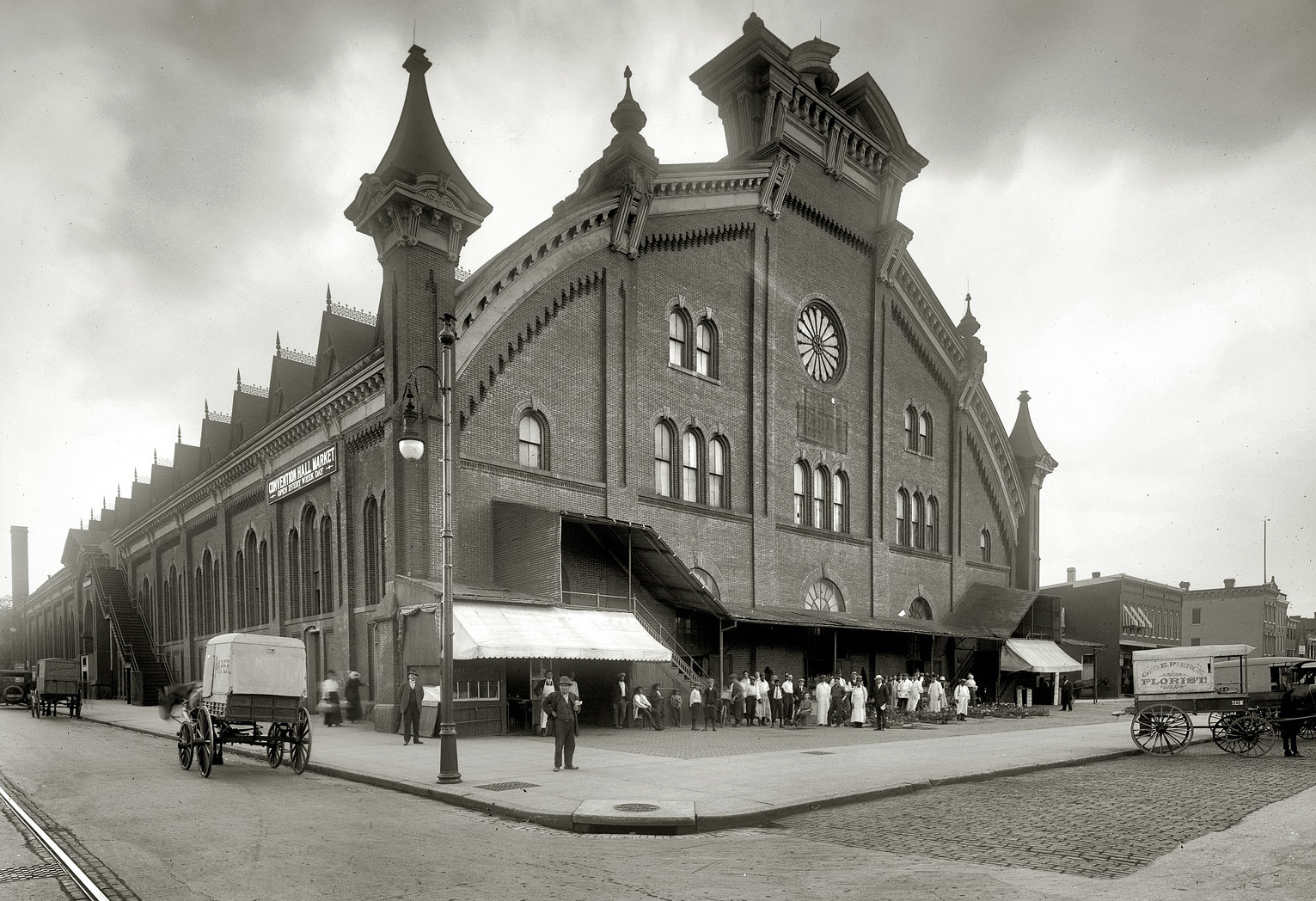
- Northern Liberty Market
- Location: 5th Street NW, between K and L Streets, NW, Washington, D.C., U.S.; 38.90290639999999°N 77.01866129999996°W
- Opening date: 1874
- Closing date: 1963
- Architect: James H. McGill
- Interactive map of Northern Liberty Market

The Northern Liberty Market, later called Convention Hall Market and Center Market, was located on the east side of 5th Street NW, between K and L streets, in the present-day Mount Vernon Triangle neighborhood of Washington, D.C. It operated from 1875 to 1963.

== History ==
=== Mount Vernon Square ===
Northern Liberty Market used to operate at Mount Vernon Square, one of the busiest parts of town at the time. This market was a collection of what was described as "dilapidated sheds". On September 3 1871, the market was torn down by order of President Ulysses Grant to General Orville Babock, Superintendent of Public Buildings and Grounds for Washington, DC authorizing Governor Alexander Shepherd. It was to become a public park before being later replaced by the Carnegie Library in 1903.

The Governor had planned to destroy the market. When the vendors learned about his plan, they appealed for an injunction. He counteracted their action with some political influence. The market by that point was guarded day and night by armed men in what looked like a siege of war. At night, the men laid down their arms a few hours only before Governor Shepherd arrived with 200 or 300 men at midnight with torches. By morning, the market was completely torn down.

Claims were made by several vendors in Court. The District of Columbia was not held responsible. Rather Governor Shepherd was held responsible for the destruction of the market. But Congress paid the demands as a gratuity by an act passed January 26, 1897 for a total of $392,215. Some payments were made before Congress passed a resolution suspending the payments. Finally, twenty-five years later in April 1899, checks totaling $125,346.35 were paid out to the few surviving victims and their descendants since many had died by then.

=== 5th Street and K Street NW ===
A new Northern Liberty Market is built in 1874 on K Street NW between 4th and 5th Street NW, a couple blocks from the old market. Built on a site previously called "Savage Square". The land was purchased at the time for the enormous price of $100,000 and the building was built at a cost of $150,000. It was designed by architect James H. McGill.

The building was 324 feet (99 m) long, 126 feet (38 m) wide, 35 feet (11 m) high on the side and 85 feet (26 m) high in the middle. Due to the marshy land, the foundations were made of stone sunken to a depth of 12 feet (3.7 m). The walls were made of red bricks and the entire roof made of wrought iron weighing 209 tons.

Many of the vendors from old Northern Liberty Market moved to the new market which opened in January 1875 and managed by the Northern Liberty Company organized by George W. King.

In 1885, a case involving the Northern Liberty Company made it to the Supreme Court of the United States as Northern Liberty Market Co. v. Kelly. The case involved a conflict between the company managing the market and a vendor who had leased a stall for a period of 99 years, renewable forever while the company's existence was limited to only twenty years.

=== Convention Hall ===
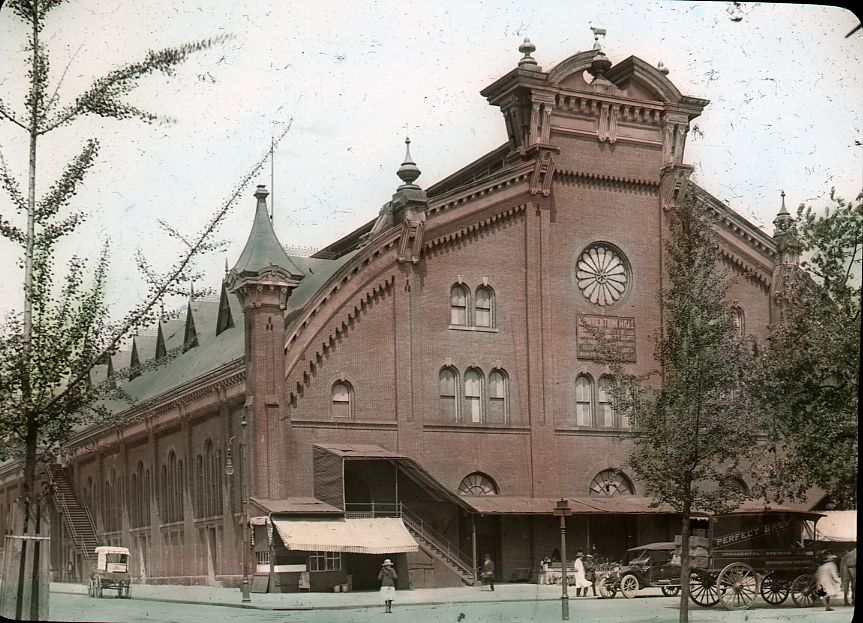
Colorized picture of the Northern Liberty Market

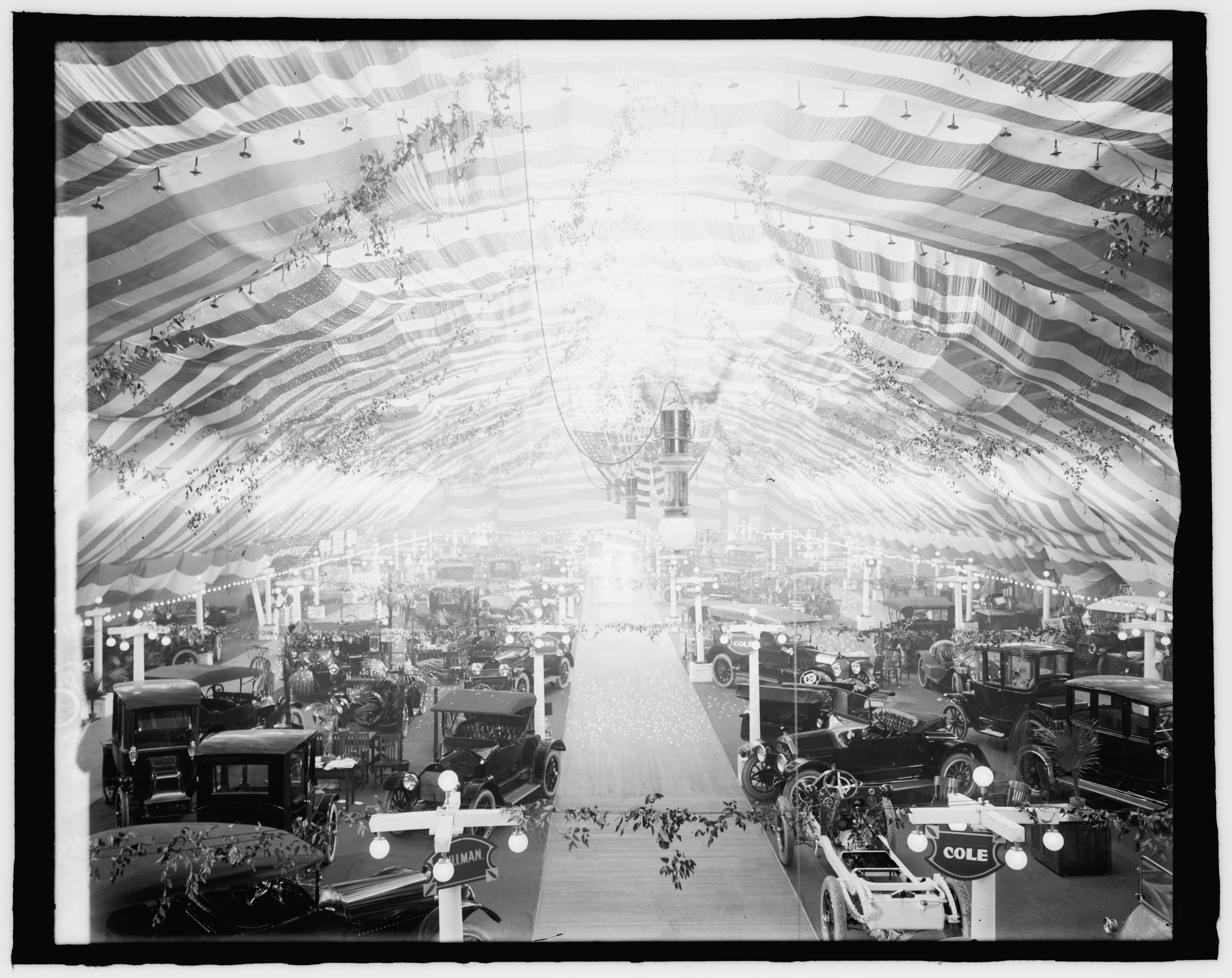
Washington Auto Show, Convention Hall, 1924

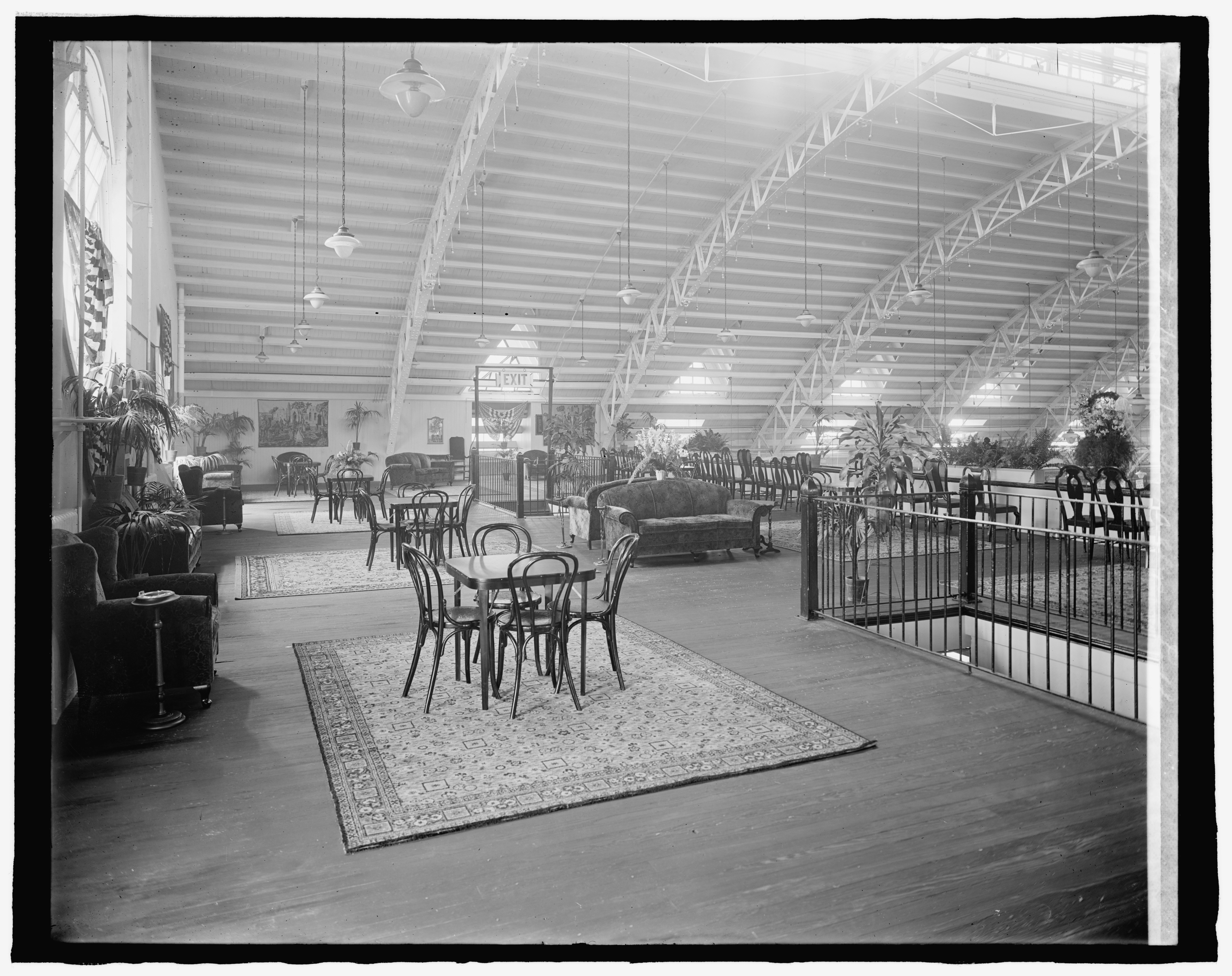
Convention Hall's lobby above the Northern Liberty Market

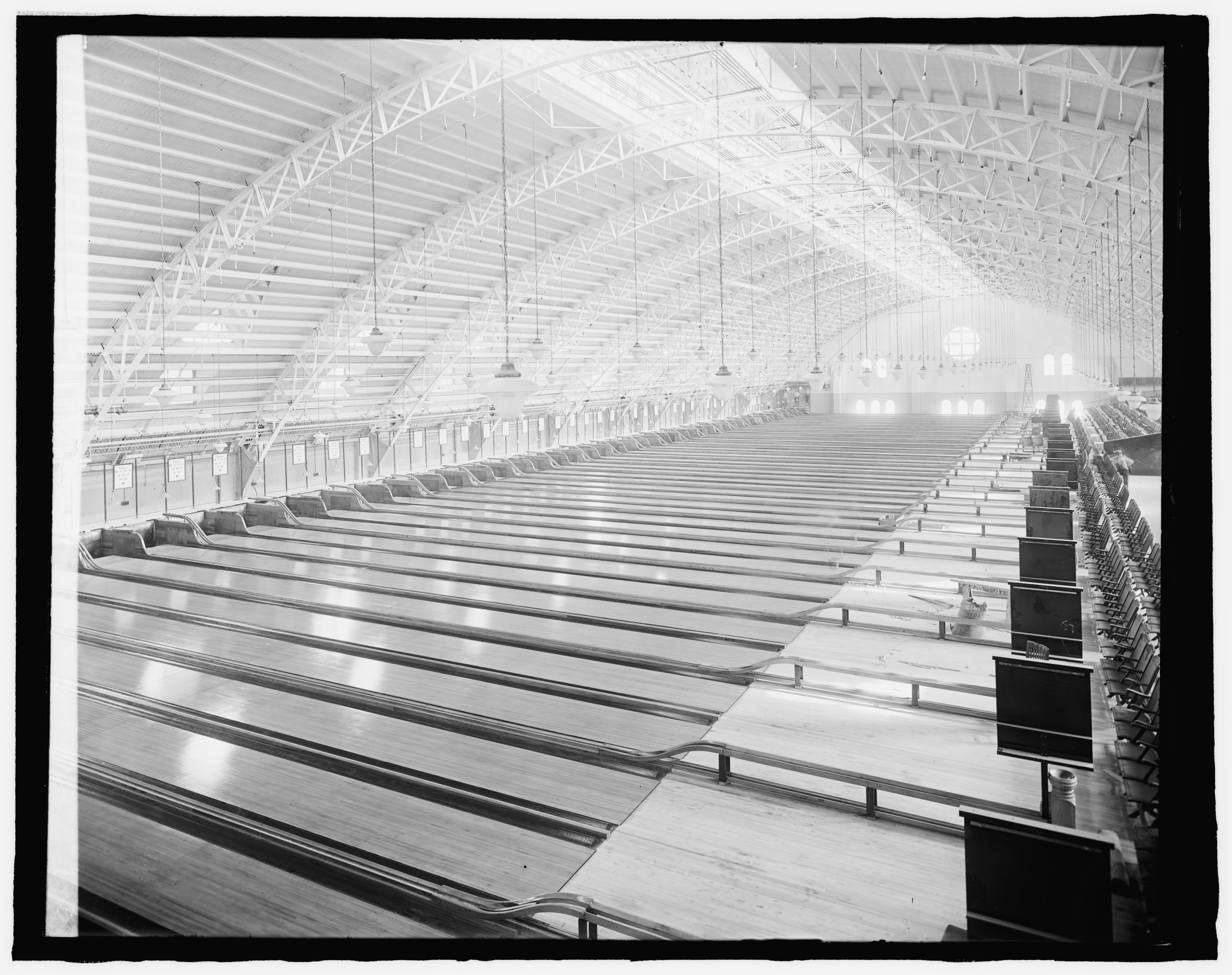
Convention Hall: bowling alleys above the Northern Liberty Market

As early as 1887, discussions were taking place of building a large hall above the market. The Hall was started in 1891. On May 22, 1893, the Convention Hall, also known as the Northern Liberty Auditorium, was officially dedicated under the auspices of the Washington Lodge, No. 15, BPO Elks. An audience of 5,000 people watched The War in song by Silas Gamaliel Pratt, a military and musical allegory of the Civil War sung by a chorus of 500 voices.

The Convention Hall was used extensively for various activities including a movie theater for silent movies, religious conventions, a roller skate rink, food shows, the Washington Auto Show and dog shows organized by the Washington Kennel Club. It was also used for High School graduations and an armory for the DC National Guard. On June 8-9, 1912, the Convention Hall was used for a banquet and a concert during the unveiling of the Columbus Fountain. The event was a major celebration in the city and gathered some of the most prominent individuals in the city. The building was one of the biggest venues at the time, allowing for large gatherings.

At some point in the 1920s or 1930s, the Hall became a bowling alley before its destruction in 1946.

In 1931, the market was renamed Center Market after the original Center Market building between Constitution Avenue and Pennsylvania Avenue was torn down to make way for the National Archives Building. The two markets were direct competitors though Northern Liberty Market was less than half the size of the old Center Market. Many of the vendors from Constitution Avenue also moved to this smaller market.

=== The Fire ===
On March 1, 1946, a fire destroyed the top floor of the structure where Convention Hall was located. According to reports at the time, five alarms were triggered. The first one was started by the police offices at the Second Precinct at 1:51 am and followed by four others. Large flames engulfed the metal structure and at 2:09 am, the roof made of 209 tons of wrought iron collapsed. It was fought with over 60 pieces of apparatus. It was finally subdued at 3:30 am thanks to large amounts of water which continued until dawn. According to the Fire Marshall, Ray Roberts, the high vaulted roof and the finishes used in the bowling alley lead to a rapid spread of the fire.

While the fire did not spread to the market underneath thanks to the reinforced cement ceiling, there was severe damage to products due to the water used. A total of 70 butcher, grocery and flower stalls were damaged. The one owned by Charles Carrington (a smoked meat dealer) was completely crushed by an iron girder which fell in an opening in the concrete ceiling. The next morning, K. F. Knudsen, general manager and superintendent of the Washington Convention Hall Company announced that they hoped to convert the building to a one-story building. He estimated the damages to $800,000 ($500,000 for the building and $300,000 for other damages). For the safety of the public, a 20-foot section of the wall on 5th Street NW was pulled down on March 2 by order of the Chief Building Inspector, J. J. Kimball.

Merchants hoped to re-open the market within two weeks of the fire. Prior to re-opening, the Health Department inspectors were to inspect the meats to determine if they were fit for consumption. The power had been cut with the fire and so the refrigeration system was not functioning for several days.

=== Reopening ===
The market was reopened, but with a flat roof. Leo and Norman Bernstein bought the property after the fire from the Washington Hall Company for $500,000. It reopened as only a market. It finally closed in 1963 due to the pressure of supermarkets with only 110 stalls occupied by that time.

A new Convention Center was planned in the area and the property attracted investors. In 1964, the National Historical Wax Museum moved to the site leaving its former home of Foggy Bottom because of the Kennedy Center. It did not last long, with the Museum moving to Southwest Washington in 1975. The empty building was finally demolished in 1985.

== Present day ==
The CityVista condominiums are now on the site with a Safeway supermarket and several other businesses on the ground floor. It is included in the D.C. Inventory of Historic Sites.
