= Milian Park =

Park in Washington, D.C., U.S.

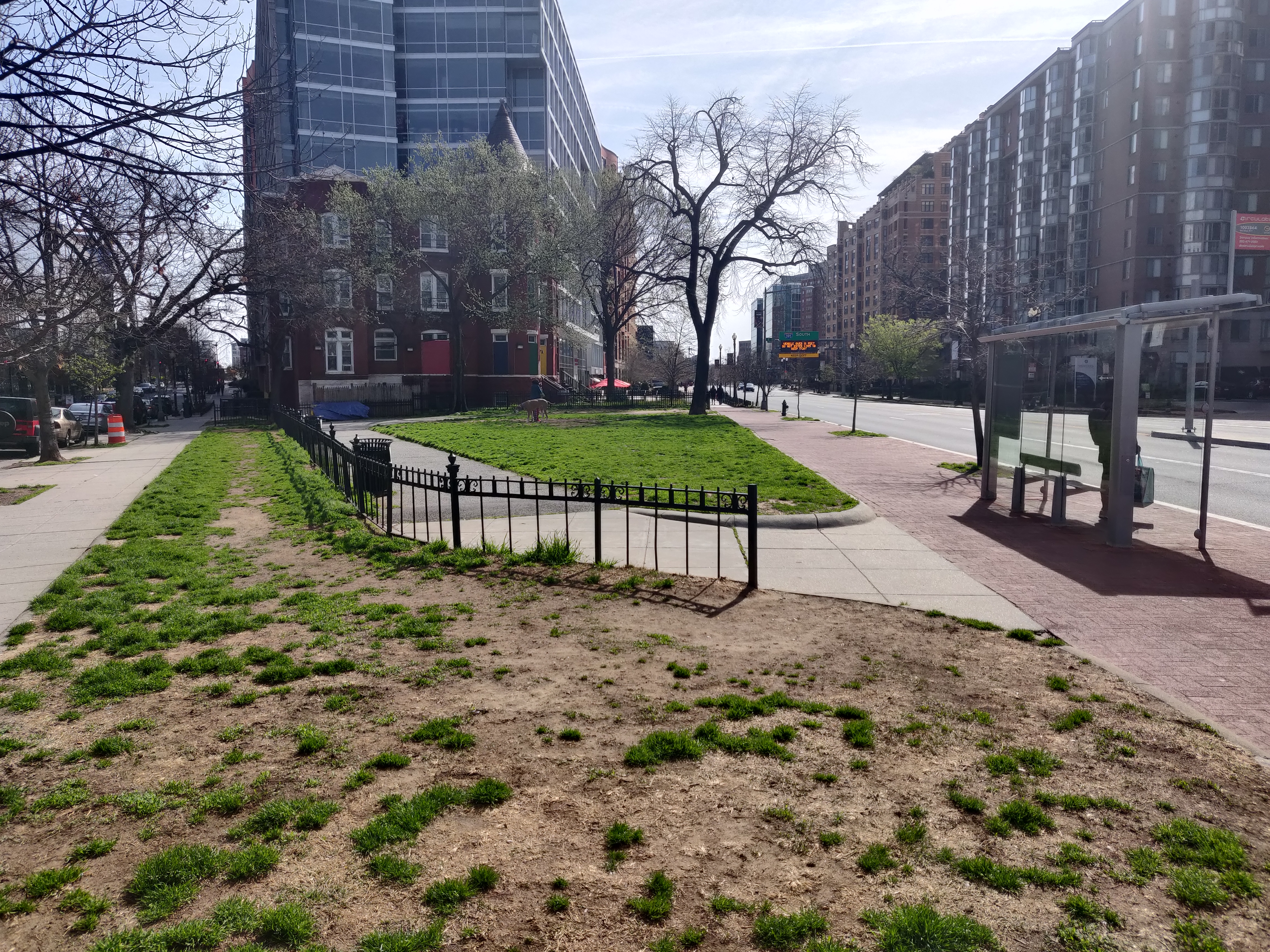

- Location within Central Washington, D.C.
- Location: Massachusetts Ave., & I St. NW Washington, D.C.
- Coordinates: 38°54′04″N 77°01′06″W
- Area: 0.24 acres (0.097 ha)
- Operator: National Park Service

Milian Park is a neighborhood-named park located on National Park Service property at north of Massachusetts Avenue at I Street, NW in the Mount Vernon Triangle neighborhood of Washington, D.C. It is named after an inventor and scholar from Spain, Michael Austin Milian who died nearby in 1886.
