= Emily Wiley House =

Historic house in Washington, D.C., United States

- U.S. National Register of Historic Places
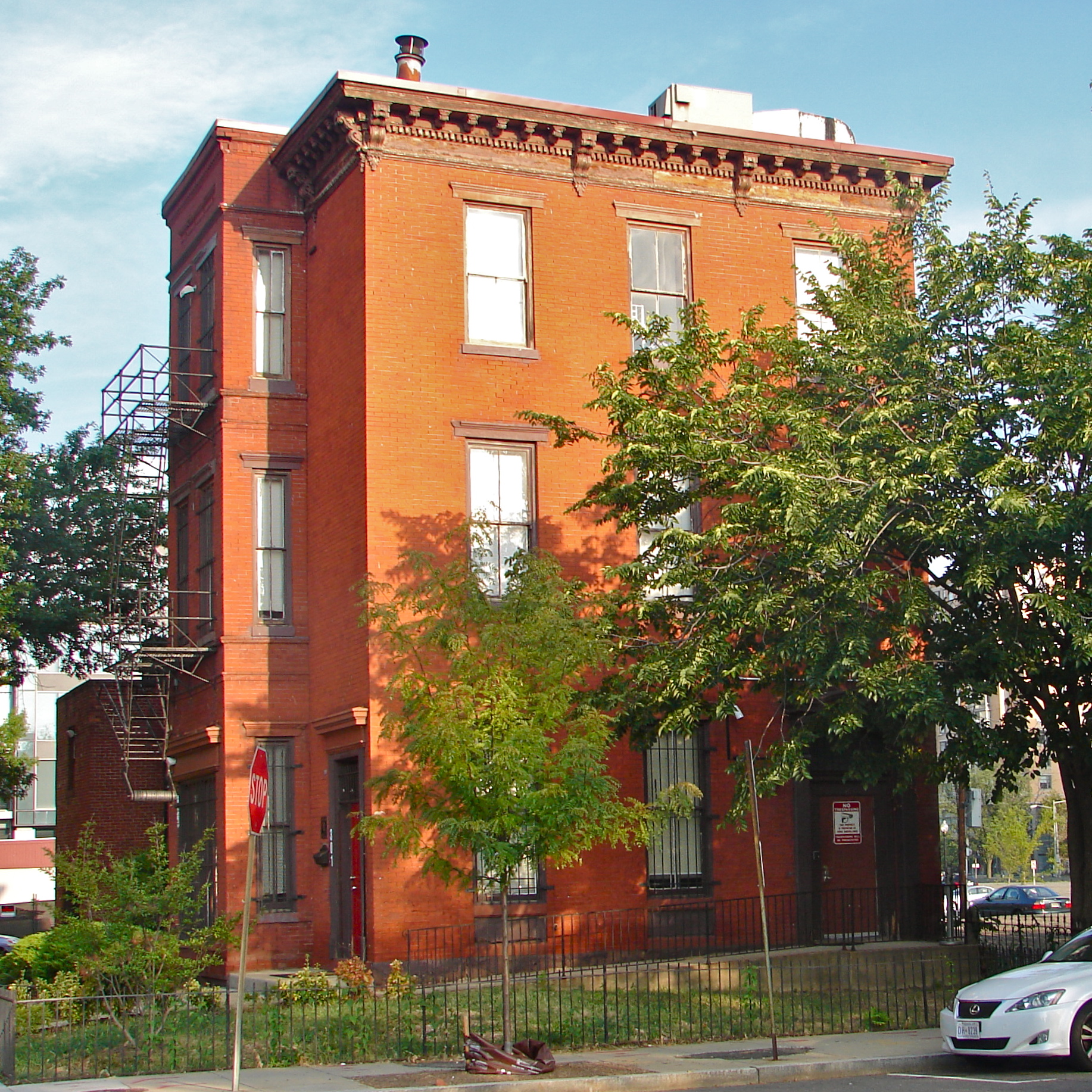

- Location within Central Washington, D.C. Location within the District of Columbia Location within the United States
- Location: 902 3rd Street, N.W., Washington, D.C.
- Coordinates: 38°54′5″N 77°0′55″W
- Area: 2372 sq ft
- Built: 1869
- Architectural style: Italianate
- NRHP reference No.: 06000192
- Added to NRHP: May 26, 2006

The Emily Wiley House is a historic building at 902 3rd Street and 301 I Street, Northwest, Washington, D.C., in the Mount Vernon Triangle neighborhood.

== History ==
The Italianate home was constructed in 1869 to 1871. It served as Holy Rosary Church, established by Father Nicholas DeCarlo, from 1914 to 1919. During the 1920s, it was the headquarters for the National Colored Voters Union, and Smith and Robinson Club.

It was listed on the National Register of Historic Places in 2006.
