= Mount Vernon Square =

Square and neighborhood in Washington, DC, US

- Mount Vernon Square Historic District
- U.S. National Register of Historic Places
- U.S. Historic district
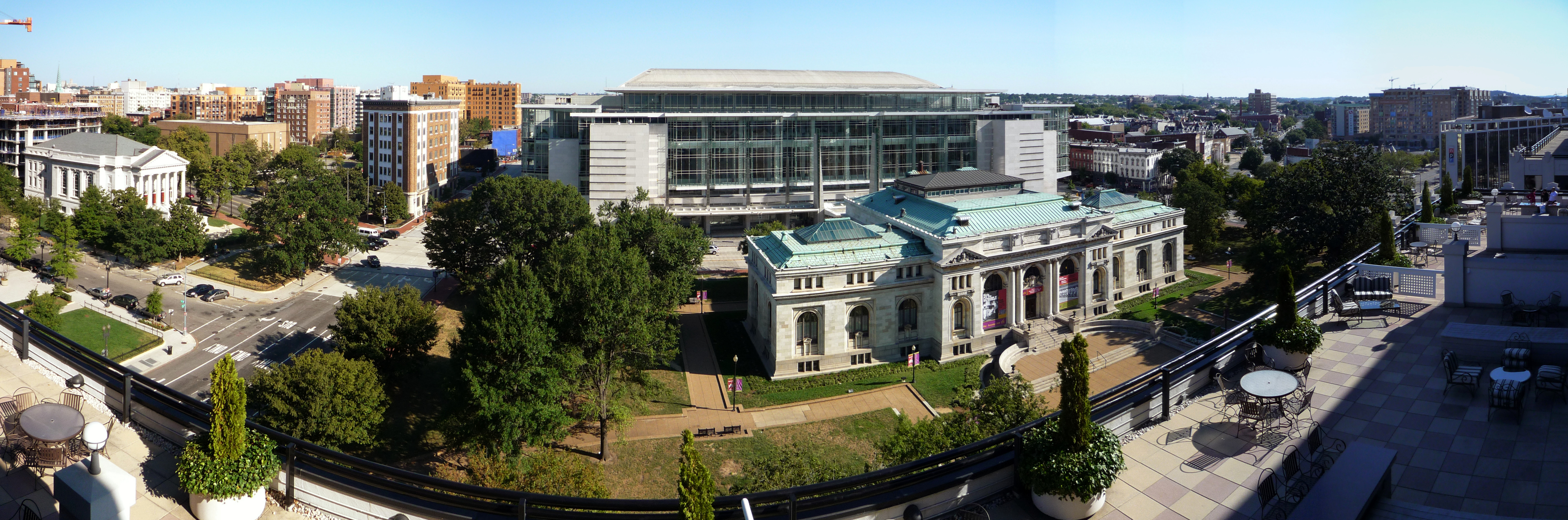
- Mount Vernon Square with Mount Vernon Place United Methodist Church, Washington Convention Center, Historical Society of Washington, D.C., and NPR's former headquarters visible

- Location within Washington, D.C.
- Location: Roughly bounded by New York Ave., 7th St., N St., and 1st St. NW, Washington, D.C., U.S.
- Coordinates: 38.902528°N 77.023583°W
- Area: 100 acres (40 ha)
- Built: 1845
- Architectural style: Late Victorian, Late 19th And 20th Century Revivals
- NRHP reference No.: 99001071
- Added to NRHP: September 3, 1999

Mount Vernon Square is a city square and neighborhood in the Northwest quadrant of Washington, D.C. The square is located where the following streets would otherwise intersect: Massachusetts Avenue NW, New York Avenue NW, K Street NW, and 8th Street NW.

== Attributes ==
Mount Vernon Square is bounded on the east by 7th Street NW, on the west by 9th Street NW, on the north by Mount Vernon Place, and on the south by a two-block section of K Street NW that is slightly offset from the rest of K Street.

In the center of the square is the Carnegie Library of Washington D.C., finished in 1903, as a gift of industrialist Andrew Carnegie. The white marble Beaux-Arts building was originally the central library for Washington, D.C. The building now houses the Historical Society of Washington, D.C., and an Apple Store.

== History ==
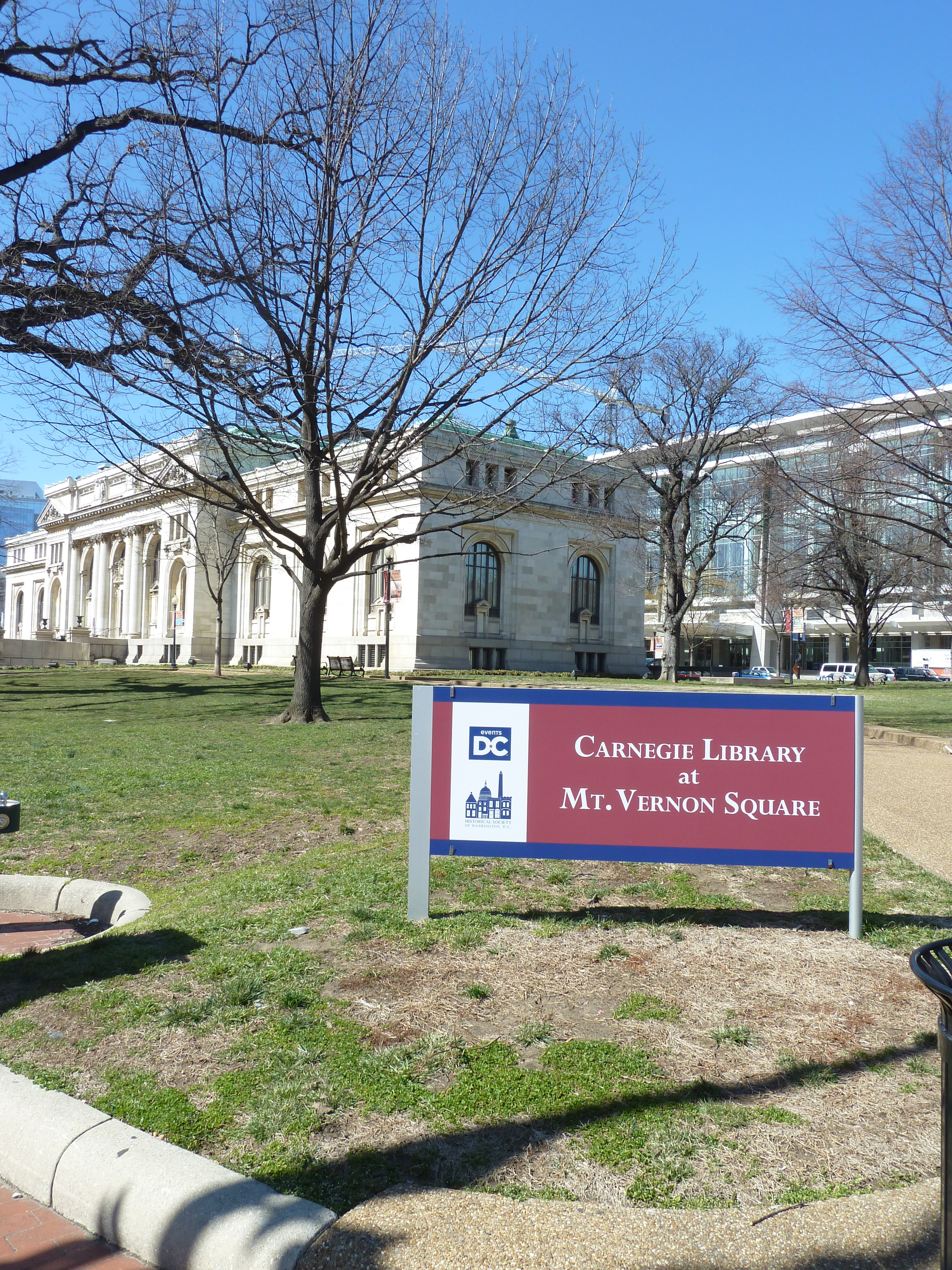
Carnegie library on the square

The square was in the original L'Enfant Plan for the city but in the early 1800s was divided into four triangles by the intersection of Massachusetts Avenue and New York Avenue. The old Northern Liberty Market stood along Seventh Street until 1872, when it was demolished by Governor Alexander Shepherd in a night raid with two to 300 men. The roadways were removed in 1882 at the request of residents who complained that "in its former condition the constant passage of vehicles of all descriptions through the park made it unpleasant and oftentimes dangerous for those frequenting it."

The Carnegie Library of Washington D.C. was built in 1903. It was the central library for the city until 1972, when the Martin Luther King Jr. Memorial Library was completed. The library sat abandoned for a decade until it was renovated as a library for the University of the District of Columbia.

In the late 19th and early 20th century, the city's furniture stores and more economical department stores such as Goldberg's and Kaufman's were located along 7th Street NW in the 7th Street shopping district, most of which was in the neighborhood now known as Mount Vernon Square. Further south, just below today's Chinatown, the 7th Street corridor met the F Street corridor with its more upscale apparel and department stores.

In 1999, the library became the headquarters for the Historical Society of Washington, D.C. The City Museum of Washington opened in the library in May 2003, but closed less than two years later.

In 2008, a sculpture was installed on the lawn at the south side of the square - "The Hand" created by Jim Fauntleroy in the 1960s for the Southern Christian Leadership Conference’s Poor People’s Campaign.

The Washington Convention and Sports Authority took over the library building in 2011, renting it out for events. The building underwent significant renovations in 2018, to accommodate a new Apple Store and exhibit space for the Historical Society.

== Neighborhood and vicinity ==
Mount Vernon Square also refers to the neighborhood northeast of the square (though the official name for this neighborhood is Mount Vernon Triangle), extending north to O Street and east to New Jersey Avenue. In the early 20th century, Victorian-style townhomes occupied the area, and the 7th Street shopping district was the city's vibrant commercial strip (along with more upscale F Street), until the Great Depression, when the area went into a steep decline. During the 1968 Martin Luther King Jr. riots, the area around the square suffered rioting, arson, and extensive vandalism.

In the 1980s, 7th Street was shut down for several years during the construction of the Green Line (Washington Metro) - the Mount Vernon Square station opened in 1991.

=== Boundaries ===
The boundaries of the neighborhood are;

- On the south, Chinatown and the Penn Quarter, usually considered the heart of Downtown Washington, D.C.
- On the north, M or O Street NW according to the source, and the Shaw neighborhood
- From the eastern boundary of the square to New Jersey Ave. is the Mount Vernon Triangle neighborhood, often mentioned together with the Mount Vernon Square neighborhood
- On the west, either Thomas Circle or 10th St. NW and the Logan Circle neighborhood

=== Old and new convention centers ===
In 1977, the city used eminent domain to purchase several blocks southwest of Mount Vernon Square. Over the next few years, the homes and businesses on these blocks were razed. The old Washington Convention Center was constructed on the area block bounded by New York Avenue NW, 9th Street NW, H Street NW, and 11th Street NW. Construction on the center began in 1980, and it opened on December 10, 1982. At 800,000 square feet (74,000 m^{2}), it was the fourth largest facility in the United States at the time. However, during the 1980s and 1990s, numerous larger and more modern facilities were constructed around the country, and by 1997 the Washington Convention Center had become the 30th largest facility.

In 1998, construction began on a new larger convention center, occupying several blocks directly north of Mount Vernon Square. The new convention center was completed in 2003, and renamed the Walter E. Washington Convention Center in 2007.

=== Commercial development ===
Many small businesses existed around Mount Vernon Square before the construction of the convention centers. One of the last businesses to exist on the west side of the square was a Chinese restaurant named Nan King (which was one of the first restaurants in the city to serve dim sum), which was open until 1979. By 2004, Alperstein's Furniture was the only store on 7th Street to survive through the construction of the Metro station and the new convention center. It closed in 2014, with a restaurant moving into its building.

On the west side of the square is the 901 New York Avenue office building (headquarters of law firm Finnegan, Henderson, Farabow, Garrett & Dunner), completed in 2003. On the east are two large office buildings, including the headquarters of law firm Arnold & Porter (opened 2016), and the headquarters for the Association of American Medical Colleges and the American Dental Education Association (opened 2014). On the south side is the Renaissance Washington DC Hotel (opened 1986), and the Techworld plaza office development (opened 1989), which is undergoing redevelopment and re-branding as "Anthem Row."

Across from the northwest corner of the square is the Washington Marriott Marquis, the largest hotel in the city, which opened in 2014. The lot at the southwest corner of the square was the former site of the old Washington Convention Center, now the CityCenterDC development, which opened in 2015.

=== Historic buildings ===
There are two historic buildings northwest of the square, Mount Vernon Place United Methodist Church and the American Federation of Labor Building. The Mount Vernon Place church was built in 1917, by the Methodist Episcopal Church, South. The Labor building was built in 1916 as the headquarters for the American Federation of Labor.

== See also ==
- List of circles in Washington, D.C.
