= Carnegie Library of Washington D.C. =

Historic building in Washington, D.C.

- Central Public Library
- U.S. National Register of Historic Places
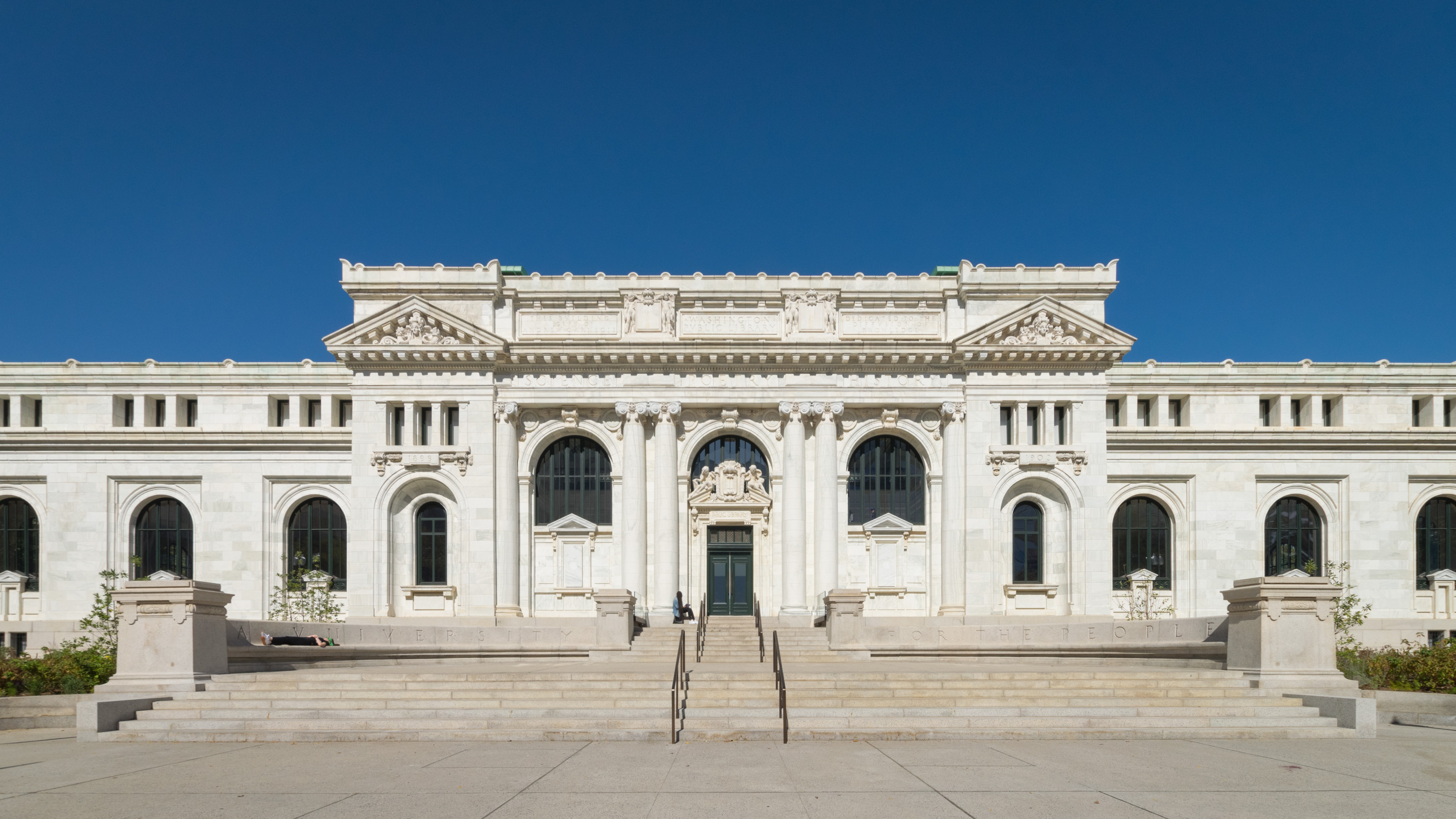
- Carnegie Library building, located at Mount Vernon Square, houses the Historical Society of Washington, D.C. (2019)

- Location within Central Washington, D.C.
- Location: Mount Vernon Sq., 8th and K Streets, NW. Washington, D.C.
- Coordinates: 38°54′9.36″N 77°1′22.44″W
- Area: 2.74 acres (1.11 ha)
- Built: 1903; 123 years ago
- Architect: Ackerman & Ross
- Architectural style: Beaux-Arts architecture
- NRHP reference No.: 69000290
- Added to NRHP: December 3, 1969

The Carnegie Library of Washington D.C. (also known as Central Public Library; referred to as Apple Carnegie Library in official communications by Apple), is situated in Mount Vernon Square, Washington, D.C. It was the city's first of four Carnegie libraries and its first desegregated public building.

== History ==
=== Use as library ===
Around 1900, Brainard Warner, a prominent local banker and developer, was serving as vice president of the Washington Public Library board of trustees when he "seized on a chance meeting with Andrew Carnegie" to ask him to fund public libraries in the city. Carnegie ultimately funded four, starting with this one. It was designed by the New York firm of Ackerman & Ross in the Beaux-Arts style. and dedicated on January 7, 1903.

It was listed on the National Register of Historic Places, as "Central Public Library", in 1969. It was used as the central public library for Washington, D.C. for almost 70 years before it became overcrowded. The central library was then moved to Martin Luther King Jr. Memorial Library. After being shut down for ten years, the central library was renovated as part of University of the District of Columbia.

=== Historical Society of Washington, D.C. ===
In 1999, it became the headquarters for the Historical Society of Washington, D.C. The City Museum of Washington opened in the library in May 2003, but closed less than two years later. In 2014, Events DC twice sought to move the International Spy Museum into the library, but failed to win historic preservation approval.

=== Apple Carnegie Library ===
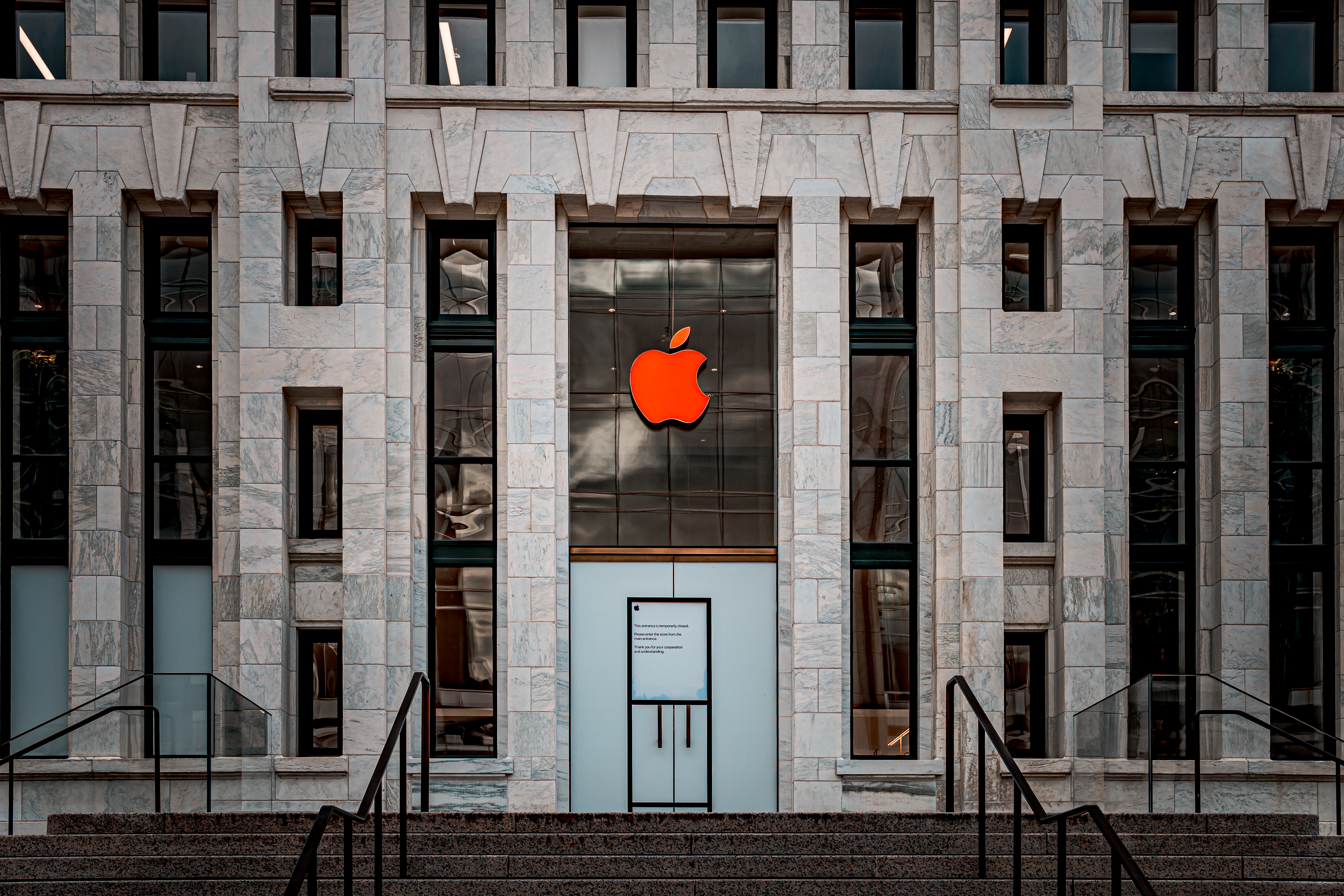
The building now houses an Apple store.

In September 2016, Apple Inc. proposed renovating the library into D.C.'s second Apple Store location. In December 2016, Events DC announced an agreement with the company for conversion of the space into a new store designed by Foster and Partners. The building was renamed the Apple Carnegie Library, and the Apple Store within opened on May 11, 2019. Apple hosts free daily sessions focused on photography, filmmaking, music creation, coding, design and more.

On October 9, 2019, the first episode of Oprah's Book Club, a television series produced by Apple, was filmed with a live audience in the library. The episode premiered on November 1 of the same year.

The building also now houses the DC History Center on the second floor, and the Carnegie Gallery (featuring historic photographs and documents about the origins and history of the building) in the basement.

== See also ==
- Architecture of Washington, D.C.
- Martin Luther King Jr. Memorial Library
- District of Columbia Public Library
- List of Carnegie libraries in Washington, D.C.
