= George Washington University residence halls =

Coordinates: 38.900750°N 77.047100°W

The George Washington University
- Established: February 9, 1821
- Location: Washington, D.C.
- Campus: Urban — Foggy Bottom; Suburban — Mount Vernon; Rural — Ashburn
- Website: www.gwu.edu

The George Washington University is one of the largest United States private universities in terms of enrollment. Almost 10,000 undergraduates attend George Washington. GW has residence halls on two of its three campuses. The Foggy Bottom campus is the university's main campus, where most of the residence halls can be found, in an urban setting. Also in Washington's Foxhall neighborhood is the Mount Vernon campus, formerly the Mount Vernon College for Women. The Mount Vernon campus provides a more suburban residential setting.

== Foggy Bottom ==
There are over 26 residences at the Foggy Bottom campus. Residences come in residence halls, or dormitories, and townhouses. Some residence halls were originally constructed as hotels and apartment buildings. The current residences on the Foggy Bottom campus vary in age; some residences were built in the 1920s and the newest, District House at 2121 H Street, opened in August 2016. Hattie M. Strong Hall is a women's only residence found on 21st Street, between G and H Streets. I (Eye) Street residences such as Munson and JBKO are very close to the Foggy Bottom–GWU Washington Metro station, which is also right next to George Washington University Hospital.

The following is a list of residence halls found on the Foggy Bottom campus:

Name	Year built	Capacity	Street	Class	Image	Notes
Potomac	2006	384	F	Freshman		Potomac House houses Freshman men and women in doubles. Rooms have a jack and Jill bathroom. There is a communal kitchen in the basement.
District House	2016	878	H	Upperclassmen (except Affinities)		District House houses upperclassmen in doubles and 2 bedroom quads. These rooms have in room kitchens and bathrooms. District House includes Freshman affinities for various programs. Affinities include a common space and kitchen.
Madison	1926	192	22nd	Freshman		Madison Hall houses Freshman men and women in doubles and quads. Rooms include a Jack and Jill bathroom and a kitchen on every floor. Madison is a National Landmark.
Thurston	1929 (Renovated 2022)	779	F	Freshman		Largest freshman residence hall. Thurston Hall houses Freshman men and women in doubles and some singles with Communal Bathrooms. Odd numbered floors have communal kitchens. Completely Renovated in 2022 and features a dining hall in the basement.
Lafayette	1926	126	I	Sophomore		Lafayette Houses Freshman men and women in doubles and Quads. Rooms feature jack and Jill bathrooms and a communal kitchen in the basement. Completely renovated in 2011.
2109 F Street	1935	47	F	Sophomore		Completely renovated in 2016. Formerly all-female residence hall until 2019–2020 academic year. One of 2 residence halls without an elevator. Rooms feature an in room bathroom and kitchen.
Mitchell	1929	350	19th	Half Freshman, Half Upperclassmen		Singles with Communal Bathrooms. Chick Fil A at street level. Kitchens on every floor. Closed for renovations until Fall 2026
Munson	1937	190	I	Sophomore		Munson is a National landmark. It houses Sophomores in double and triple studios. Rooms have in room bathrooms and kitchens
Jacqueline Bouvier Kennedy Onassis (JBKO)	1936	263	I	Sophomore		JBKO houses Sophomores in double and triple studios. Rooms have in room bathrooms and kitchens
Building JJ	1920	32	F	All (Greek Life)	|	Building JJ features double and six person rooms throughout three floors. Rooms have in room bathrooms and kitchens
Fulbright	1939	231	H	Sophomore		Fulbright is a National landmark. It houses Sophomores in triple studios. Rooms have in room bathrooms and kitchens
Francis Scott Key	1940	163	20th	Sophomore		FSK houses freshmen in double, triple, and quadruple studios. Rooms have in room bathrooms and communal kitchens on floors 3 and 5. Recent renovations to meet freshmen housing needs removed in room kitchens.
Guthridge	1926	297	F	Freshman		Guthridge houses Freshman in double, triple, quadruple, and quintuple rooms. Rooms have in room bathrooms and communal kitchens on floors 2 and 6.
South Hall	2009	450	F	Juniors and Seniors		South Hall features four and five bedroom suites for junior and senior students. Rooms have a living room, full kitchen, 2 bathrooms, and in unit laundry.
Amsterdam Hall	1997	434	H	Sophomores		Formerly known as New Hall. Houses Upperclassmen in 2 bedroom, 4 person rooms. Rooms have a living room, full kitchen, and 2 bathrooms.
Strong	1936	109	21st	All (Greek Life) (Women Only)		Women only Sorority housing featuring doubles and singles. Doubles have jack and jIll bathrooms, singles have a communal bathroom. Communal kitchens on the first floor and lounges in the basement and the roof. National Register of Historic Places
1959 E Street	2002	459	E	Junior and Senior		Starbucks, Subway, and SecreTea at street level. Four and Five Person Rooms with Three and Four Bedrooms. Rooms have 2 Bathrooms, a living room, a full kitchen, and in unit laundry.
Shenkman Hall	2004	722	23rd	Upperclassmen		Basement level features a Dining Hall. Formerly known as Ivory Tower. Four person, two bedroom suites. Rooms have a living rooms, 2 bathrooms, and a full kitchen.
The Dakota	1989	172	F	Upperclassmen		Three and four person suites with two and three bedrooms. Rooms have a living room, 2 bathrooms, a full kitchen, and in unit laundry.
International House	1966	140	Virginia Avenue	Sophomores		Ihouse features double studio rooms. This is the only building with the possibility of a balcony in a students room (approx. half of all rooms). Rooms have in room bathrooms and kitchens.
Townhouse Row	2002	30 Per House (240 total)	23rd	All (Greek Life)		Townhouses A-H are Greek Life housing. All of the above feature doubles. Rooms have jack and jill bathrooms and a living room/lounge and full kitchen on the first floor
Small Townhouses	Varies	6-12 per building	Varies	All (Greek Life/Program Specific)		Various Small Townhouses across campus are used for Greek Life and other programs. These Include 605 21st St, 2121 F St, 2123 F St, 522 22nd St, 2206 F St, 2208 F St, 603 22nd St, 605 22nd St, 607 22nd St, 611 22nd St. 522 22nd St is the Casa Cisneros Program and 611 22nd St is the George Washington Williams House for African Americans. These are historic townhouses and are oriented in various ways depending on original design. All include a living room and full kitchen on the main floor.

== Mount Vernon ==
The following is a list of residence halls found on the Mount Vernon campus:

Name	Year Built	Capacity	Class	Image	Notes
Merriweather Hall	1960	48	Freshman		Merriweather houses residents in doubles. Rooms have jack and jill bathrooms and a communal kitchen in the basement.
Hensley Hall	1945	37	Freshman		Hensley houses 39 men and women in doubles. Rooms have jack and jll bathrooms and a communal kitchen in the basement.
Clark Hall	1945	23	Freshman		Clark Hall houses freshman in doubles. rooms have jack and jill bathrooms and a communal kitchen in the basement.
Somers Hall	1945 (renovated 2002)	249	Freshman		Somers was fully renovated in 2002. It houses 246 men and women in doubles. Rooms have jack and Jill bathrooms and a communal kitchen in the basement.
Cole Hall	1945	45	Freshman		Cole Hall houses freshman in doubles. Rooms have jack and jill bathrooms and communal kitchen in the basement.
West Hall	2010	283	Mostly Freshman, Some Upperclassmen	Rendering, UNDER CONSTRUCTION	houses men and women in singles or three and four bedroom quads. Rooms have a living room, in room bathroom, and small food prep area with a fridge. Kitchens are on every floor. Features a dining hall and mail services in the basement. The black box theater is in the 2nd basement.
