= Broyhill =

Broyhill may refer to:

- Broyhill Furniture of Lenoir, North Carolina, United States
  - James Edgar Broyhill (1892–1988), founder of Broyhill Furniture
  - Jim Broyhill (1927–2023), American politician and U.S. Representative and Senator from the state of North Carolina, son of the above
- Joel Broyhill (1919–2006), American politician and a Congressman from Virginia for 11 terms, from 1953 to 1974
- Lincoln Broyhill (1925–2008), record-setting American tail-gunner in World War II and later a successful real estate developer

== See also ==
- M.T. Broyhill & Sons Corporation a Washington DC–based building company, United States
- Beroe Hill
- Bray Hill
- Bury Hill
