= Arlington Forest, Virginia =

Neighborhood in Virginia, US

- Arlington Forest Historic District
- U.S. National Register of Historic Places
- U.S. Historic district
- Virginia Landmarks Register
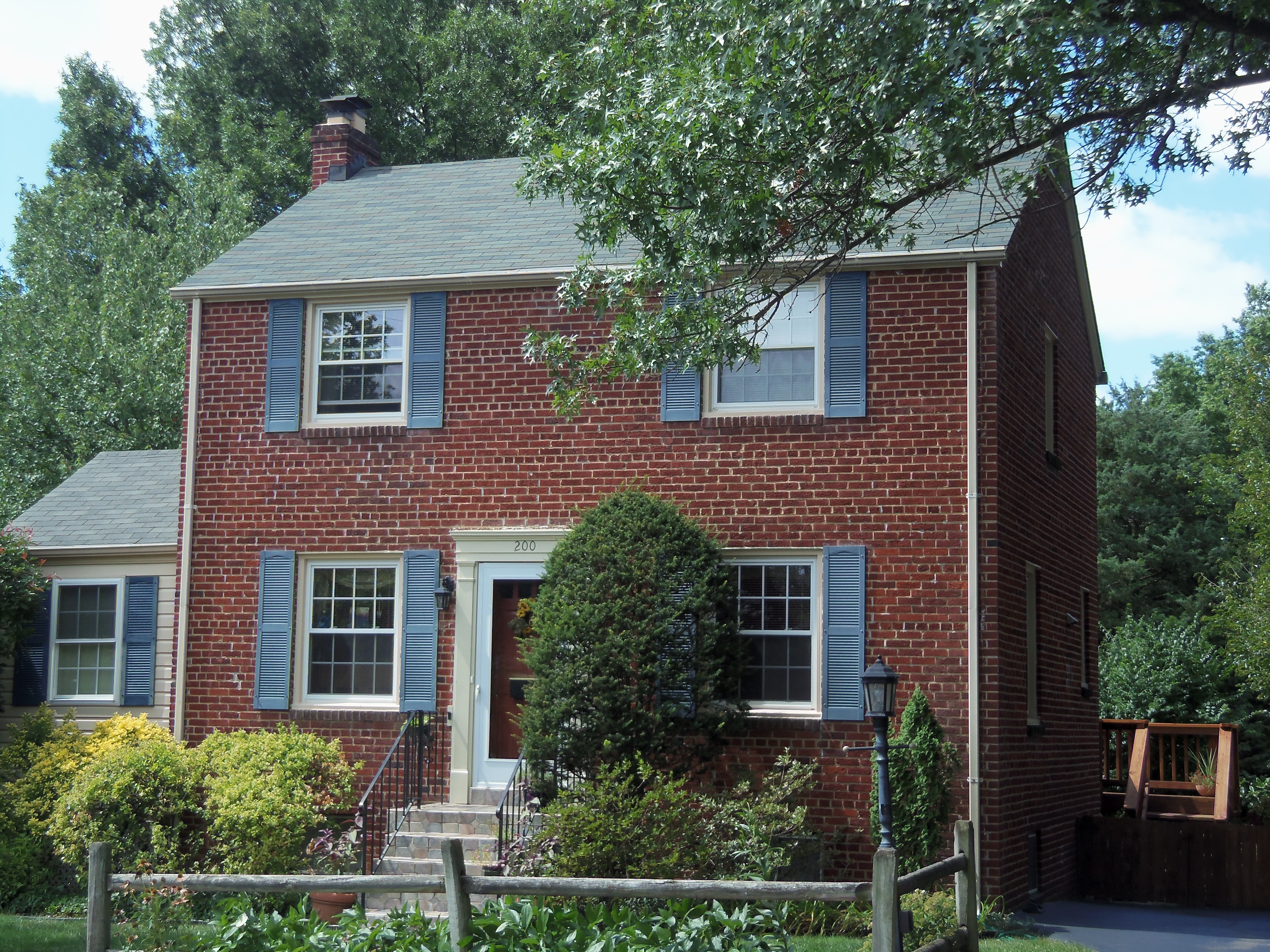

- Location within District of Columbia Location within Virginia Location within the United States
- Location: Bounded by Carlin Springs Rd., George Mason Dr., Henderson Rd., Aberdeen St., Columbus St., Granada, Galveston and 2nd, Arlington County, Virginia
- Coordinates: 38°52′14″N 77°07′08″W
- Area: 219.2 acres (88.7 ha)
- Built: 1939–1948
- Built by: Meadowbrook Construction Company, M.T. Broyhill & Sons Corporation
- Architect: Robert O. Scholz, J. Raymond Mims
- Architectural style: Colonial Revival
- MPS: Historic Residential Suburbs in the United States, 1830-1960 MPS
- NRHP reference No.: 05001344
- VLR No.: 000-7808

Significant dates
- Added to NRHP: December 2, 2005
- Designated VLR: September 8, 2004

Arlington Forest is a neighborhood in Arlington County, Virginia, United States. As of 2022, the 219-acre (89 ha) neighborhood comprised 852 single-family detached houses. A substantial portion of the neighborhood is a national historic district, the Arlington Forest Historic District. At the time of its nomination to the National Register of Historic Places in 2005, the historic district contained 810 contributing buildings and 3 contributing sites in a subdivision in South Arlington and two sites in North Arlington.

The Arlington Forest neighborhood was developed in four stages between 1939 and 1948, known as Southside, Northside, Greenbrier, and Broyhill's Addition. In the first phase, from 1939 to 1946, Meadowbrook, the builder, collaborated with the locally prominent architect Robert O. Scholz to design the two-story brick homes with Colonial Revival detailing. The neighborhood is representative of a mid-20th century planned community in Arlington County. It was listed on the Virginia Landmarks Register in 2004 and listed on the National Register of Historic Places in 2005.

== Description ==
Arlington Forest is a suburban neighborhood and historic district in Arlington County, Virginia, about 3.5 mi (5.6 km) from Washington, D.C. As of 2022, the 219-acre neighborhood comprised 852 single-family detached houses, each on small lots of approximately 6,000 ft^{2} (560 m^{2}). At the time of its addition to the National Register of Historic Places in 2005, the historic district comprised 810 contributing structures and three contributing sites, as well as 293 non-contributing buildings. The bordering neighborhoods of Barcroft, Bluemont, and Glencarlyn are alike Arlington Forest in primarily being single-family residences, while the northeastern neighbor of Ballston has high-density and mixed-used zoning around the Ballston–MU Metro station. Arlington Forest is representative of a mid-20th century planned community in Arlington County.

Arlington Boulevard, the line that divides North and South Arlington, cuts east–west through Arlington Forest. With Lubber Run – a stream which runs north–south through the neighborhood – Arlington Forest can be divided into four sections: Northside in the northeast, Greenbrier in the northwest, Southside to the southeast, and Broyhill's Addition to the southwest. As of 2022, there were 282 houses in Northside, 399 houses in Greenbrier, and a combined 171 houses in Southside and Broyhill's Addition. The residences were mostly constructed between 1939 and 1948 as a planned community. The original Colonial Revival two-story brick houses are arranged in rows. Colonial Revival houses still comprise the majority of structures in the neighborhood, but other styles have since been introduced.

A mix-use development, the neighborhood includes a shopping center built in the 1940s. Fronting to Arlington Boulevard, the Arlington Forest Shopping Center was constructed to the contemporary recommendations of the Federal Housing Administration (FHA). The shopping center centers on a building configured in an L-shape and follows the surrounding residential architecture by being completed in brick with Colonial Revival styling. A parking lot is located in front of the complex and along the service road parallel to Arlington Boulevard. As of 2022, eleven businesses operated in the shopping center. One of the occupants of shopping center is an Outback Steakhouse, which the US senator Jim Justice described as his favorite restaurant.

A citizens association operates within Arlington Forest. The Arlington Forest Citizens Association represents the neighborhood in lobbying and collaborating with the school board and Arlington County.

=== Residential architecture ===
The FHA published the bulletin Principles of Planning Small Houses in 1936, in which five house designs were described as samples for use in future planned communities. The designs – labeled A, B, C, D, and E – were intended as simple and inexpensive models that could be modified to accommodate a variety of building materials. The FHA issued a revised edition of the bulletin in 1940 that promoted both standardization and variation in construction and materials. Arlington Forest's original construction followed models from the 1936 edition, with the construction and materials reflecting the 1940 edition.

The original developer, the Meadowbrook Construction Company, and the local architect Robert O. Scholz adapted three of the FHA model styles for the Arlington Forest development. Meadbrook and Scholz's modified form of the E type – the largest of the FHA's five designs – was the most commonly used in the neighborhood. These houses were each built with a full basement, Colonial Revival decorations, three bedrooms on the second floor, and usually an attached one-story side porch around the entrances. Also common were a variety of permutations on the D type, which were built with a basement and three bedrooms on the second floor – but without the FHA design's attached garage. A few houses were also built to a modification of the C type. The FHA's proposed C type featured contrasting exterior materials between the two floors, and this was adopted more broadly by Meadowbrook during Arlington Forest's development.

The houses of Broyhill's Addition were designed and built by M.T. Broyhill & Sons Corporation and the architect J. Raymond Mims. These houses also follow patterns established by the FHA and were completed in a Colonial Revival style.

Since their original construction, many Arlington Forest's houses have been modified with minor renovations to accommodate the needs and tastes of their owners. Among the common changes were the enclosing of existing porches or construction of new ones, the building of additions on the rear or sides of houses, and the insertion of new windows. Most original houses in the neighborhood largely retain their original styling, though nine were so substantially modified by 2005 that they were not considered contributing structures when the neighborhood was designated a national historic district.

== History ==
=== Pre-development ===
Pre-European contact, Native Americans lived in the area that is now Arlington Forest. During the Colonial period, the region was divided into large land grants. The majority of the modern Arlington Forest neighborhood was once part of land owned by the planter and merchant John Colville, who had purchased a 1,400-acre plot along Lubber Run in 1731. Colville received permission to construct a grist mill along Four Mile Run in 1754 and several other grist mills followed. An 165-acre plot on Lubber Run was purchased from Colville by William Carlin, George Washington's tailor, in 1772.

Three houses from the 19th century survive in Arlington Forest. William Carlin built the Mary Carlin House on what is now the western edge of the neighborhood for his daughter c. 1800. Broyhill's Addition contains both the one-story Ann Carlin Cottage (built c. 1850) and a two-story frame farmhouse (built sometime between the 1820s and 1840s). During the American Civil War, the farmhouse belonged to Charles Eli Mix, the chief clerk of the Bureau of Indian Affairs. The farmhouse's carriage house also survives. An 1878 map of Arlington County indicates that the majority of what later became Arlington Forest was occupied by the families of Mix and William Sypher (spelled incorrectly as "Cypher" on the map).

A 38-acre tract carved from the original Lubber Run tract was acquired by the former Missouri senator John B. Henderson in 1891. His son, John B. Henderson Jr., also acquired two tracts totaling 101 acres cut from the Lubber Run tract. The Henderson family thus owned the majority of what is now Arlington Forest. In 1925, 6.76 acres of the Henderson tract was purchased by the patent lawyer Herbert H. Porter, who grew exotic herbs on the property as a hobby using irrigation from a small concrete dam on Lubber Run. This property was acquired in 1951 by Arlington County. In the 1930s, the remaining Henderson tract was considered a possible site for a new naval hospital; what is now the Walter Reed National Military Medical Center was instead built in Bethesda, Maryland.

=== As Arlington Forest ===
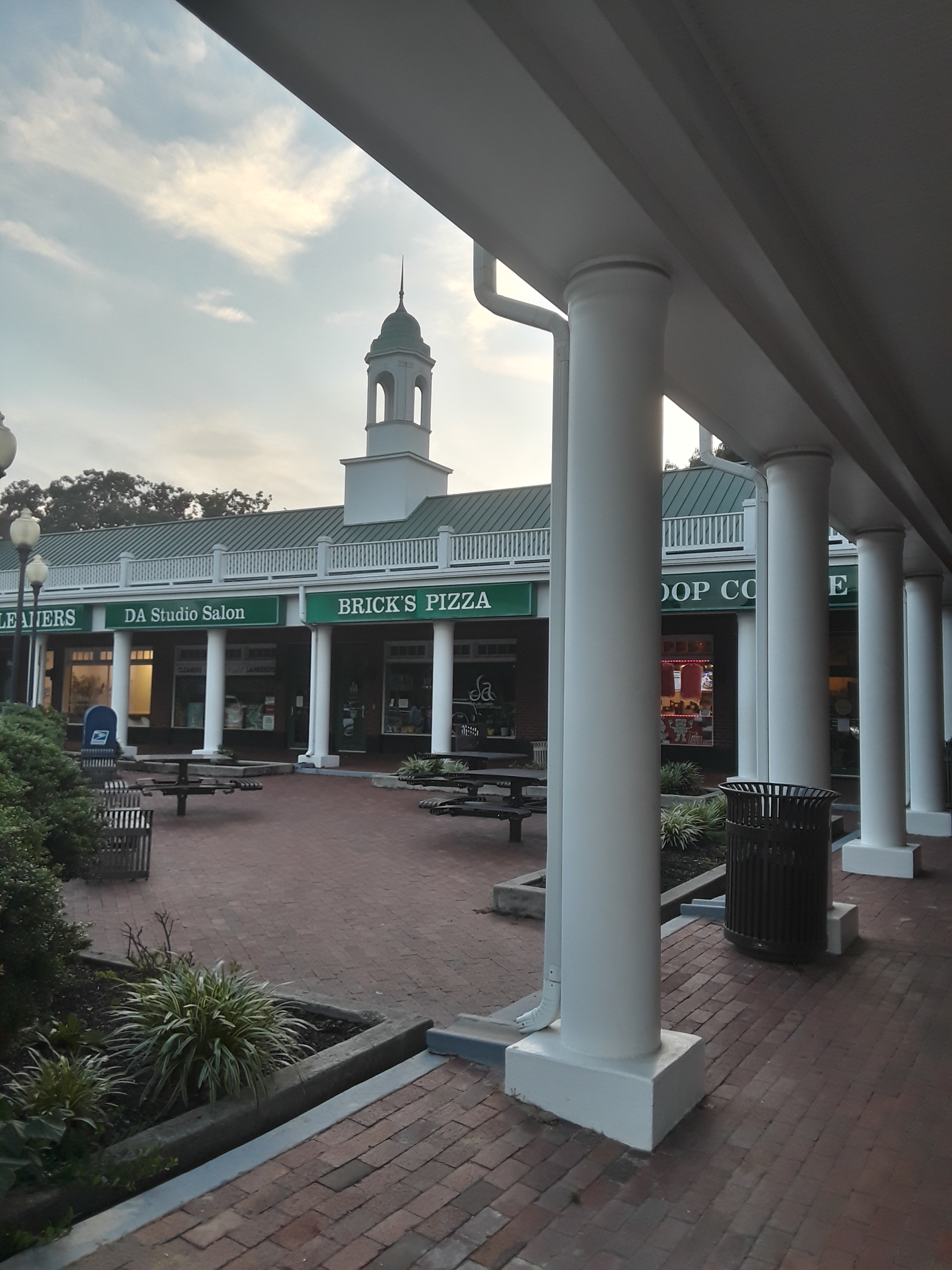
The Arlington Forest Shopping Center, 2023

The remaining Henderson tract changed hands several times after 1930 with no development occurring. Monroe Warren, the president of the D.C.-based Meadowbrook Construction Company, acquired the tract in 1939. Capitalizing on an FHA program for financing that encouraged homeownership, Meadowbrook named the area Arlington Forest and began construction. The homes were designed by Meadowbrook and Robert O. Scholz, with Scholz's previous work including the Alban Towers in D.C. The first houses began going up along Lee Boulevard (now Arlington Boulevard) in 1939. The 1939 advertised sale price of these Southside homes was $5,000 (equivalent to $88,200 in 2024). During the 1940–41 construction of the Northside and Greenbrier houses, the standard models of those houses were advertised as $5,990 (equivalent to $98,300 in 2024).

Meadowbrook established restrictive covenants in Arlington Forest. These covenants – encouraged by the FHA as a means of keeping bolstering house values – prohibited residency or use of property in neighborhood by anyone not of Caucasian ancestry, with an exception for non-white domestic servants of white homeowners or tenants. The covenants were set for expiration in 1970 and were enforced through civil lawsuits. The U.S. Supreme Court prohibited racially restrictive covenants with their decision Shelley v. Kraemer in 1948.

The Arlington Forest Citizens Association was founded in 1940, soon after the first houses in the neighborhood were occupied. Construction continued in Greenbrier through the Second World War. The final stage of construction in the neighborhood was undertaken 1948. Not part of the Meadbrook, the design and construction of what became Broyhill's Addition was performed by the D.C.-based M.T. Broyhill & Sons Corporation and the architect J. Raymond Mims, with the latter having worked on Al's Motors building in Ballston. The houses of Broyhill's Addition follow the rest of Arlington Forest's Colonial Revival styling. In 1948, they were priced at (equivalent to $104,000 in 2024)

The Arlington Forest Shopping Center was built in three sections in 1941, 1946, and 1947. The inclusion of a shopping area within a residential development was an innovation. The neighborhood was the first in Virginia to use service roads, which became common in later developments. A recreation club opened in 1945, with a swimming pool open to residents built in 1954. The neighborhood's plan was used as a model during the period, and an aerial photo of Arlington Forest was featured on the cover of the federal government publication Suggested Land Subdivision Regulations in 1960. According to the 1980 United States census, the population of Arlington Forest was 2,257 people.

On September 8, 2004, Arlington Forest was listed on the Virginia Landmarks Register. It was listed on the National Register of Historic Places as a historic district December 2, 2005. The neighborhood is presently a commuter suburb of Washington, D.C.

== Natural features ==
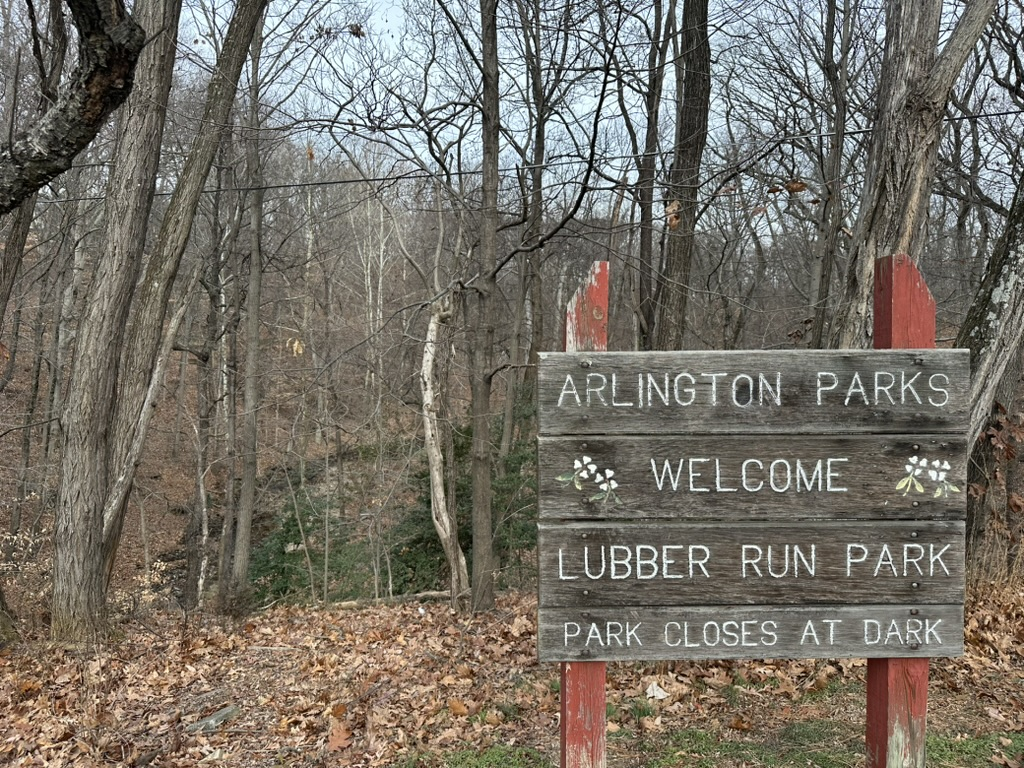
Lubber Run Park in Arlington Forest, with Lubber Run visible in the ravine below

Arlington Forest is located on the eastern edge of Virginia's Piedmont, where it meets the Atlantic Plain along the Fall Line. The Piedmont is defined by its crystalline metamorphic and igneous rocks and hilly surface, producing streams with fast-moving water. Several grist mills were once present along the Fall Line on Four Mile Run. A ravine was once located where Lubber Run Park's parking lot was constructed; this was filled in using earth taken from the excavation for the neighborhood's basements.

Water from the neighborhood drains into Four Mile Run, as well as its tributaries Lubber Run and the Arlington Forest Branch. Four Mile Run crosses the Fall Line during its run along Arlington Forest, and the middle of the stream functions as the border between the Arlington Forest Citizens Association and the Glencarlyn Citizens Association.

The Arlington Forest area had been mostly forested prior to the neighborhood's construction. These woods were mostly destroyed during the development, with many chestnut trees succumbing to blight in 1940. Meadowbrook aimed to preserve two trees for each house constructed and planted trees when houses were built on what was previously field. The maturation of plantings has restored the tree canopy. On Arlington Forest's edges are wooded areas, and Lubber Run Park is forested with hardwood tree.

In front of the shopping center is the one-acre Arlington Forest Park. This is the smallest of seven Natural Resource Conservation Areas designated by Arlington County. The park is covered by largely undisturbed native soil, despite the surrounding development. The park's plants form a oak–heath forest remnant plant community known as a dry gravel cap poverty oat grass glade.
