= Corcoran Hall =

- U.S. National Register of Historic Places
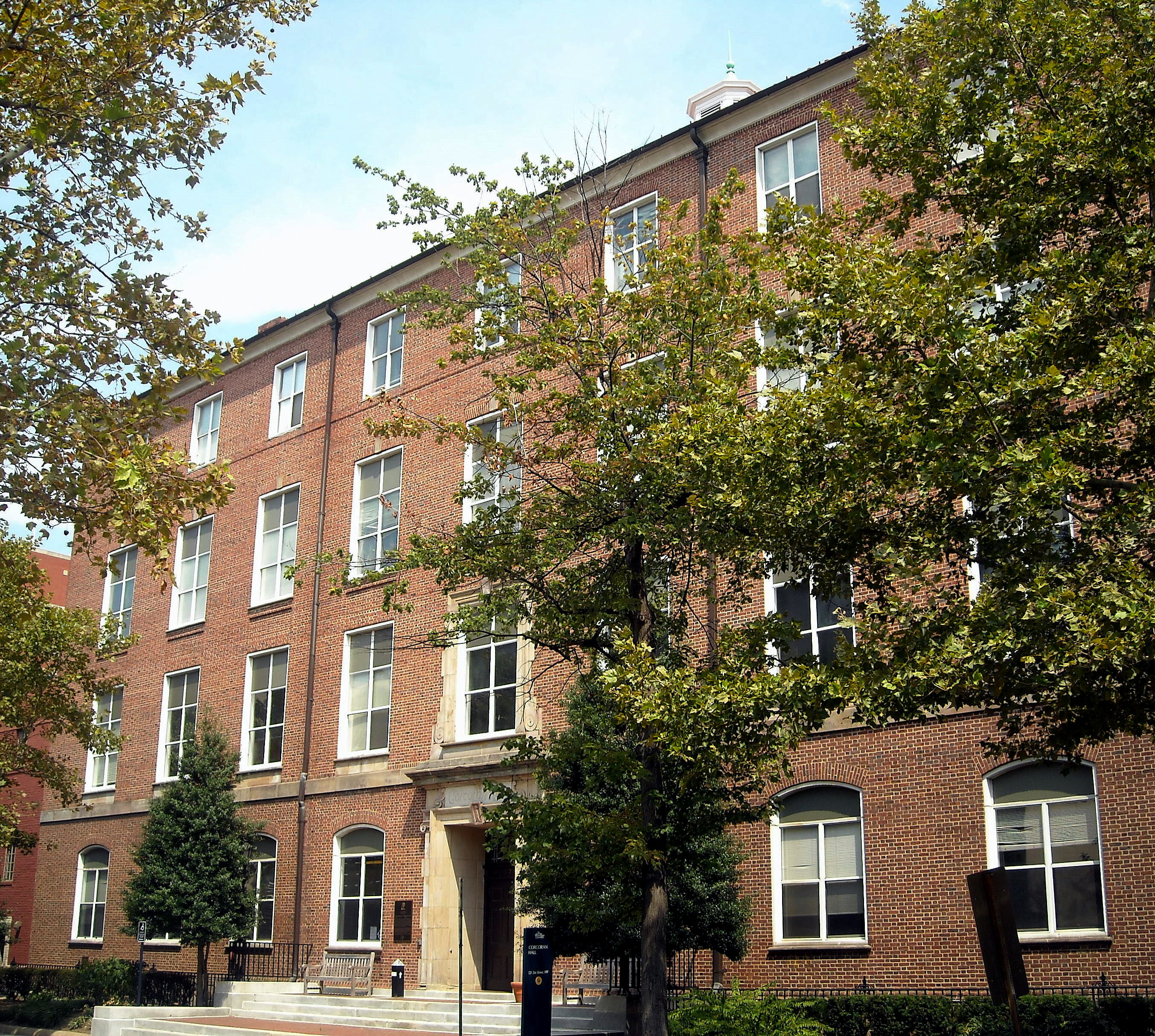

- Location within Washington, D.C.
- Location: 725 21st St., NW; Washington, D.C.
- Coordinates: 38°53′57″N 77°2′48″W
- Area: less than one acre
- Built: 1924
- Architect: Albert L. Harris & Arthur B. Heaton
- Architectural style: Colonial Revival
- NRHP reference No.: 90001545
- Added to NRHP: April 12, 1991

Corcoran Hall is an academic building on the campus of George Washington University in Washington, D.C. It was listed on the District of Columbia Inventory of Historic Sites in 1987 and the National Register of Historic Places in 1991.

== History ==
Corcoran Hall was the first building built on the university's Foggy Bottom campus. The building was designed by architects Albert L. Harris and Arthur B. Heaton in the Colonial Revival style. It was dedicated on October 28, 1924, and named after William Wilson Corcoran, who was President of the Trustees and benefactor of the university. Nuclear physicist George Gamow both taught and did research in the building from 1934 to 1956. The bazooka was developed in the basement during World War II. The physics department is now housed in the building.

== Architecture ==
The Colonial Revival building is a four-story structure with a concrete and steel frame. The exterior is covered in red brick laid in Flemish bond and trimmed in limestone. The rectangular structure is 136 feet (41 m) wide and 55 feet (17 m) deep. The main entrance to the building is in the center of the main facade and is flanked by four segmental arched windows on each side. The upper stories are similarly symmetrical with rectangular windows. A simple cornice frames the top of the building. A cupola tops the structure.

== See also ==
- H.B. Burns Memorial Building
- Fulbright Hall
- Madison Hall
- Munson Hall
- Jacqueline Bouvier Kennedy Onassis Hall
- Stockton Hall
- Hattie M. Strong Residence Hall
