= Stockton Hall =

- U.S. National Register of Historic Places
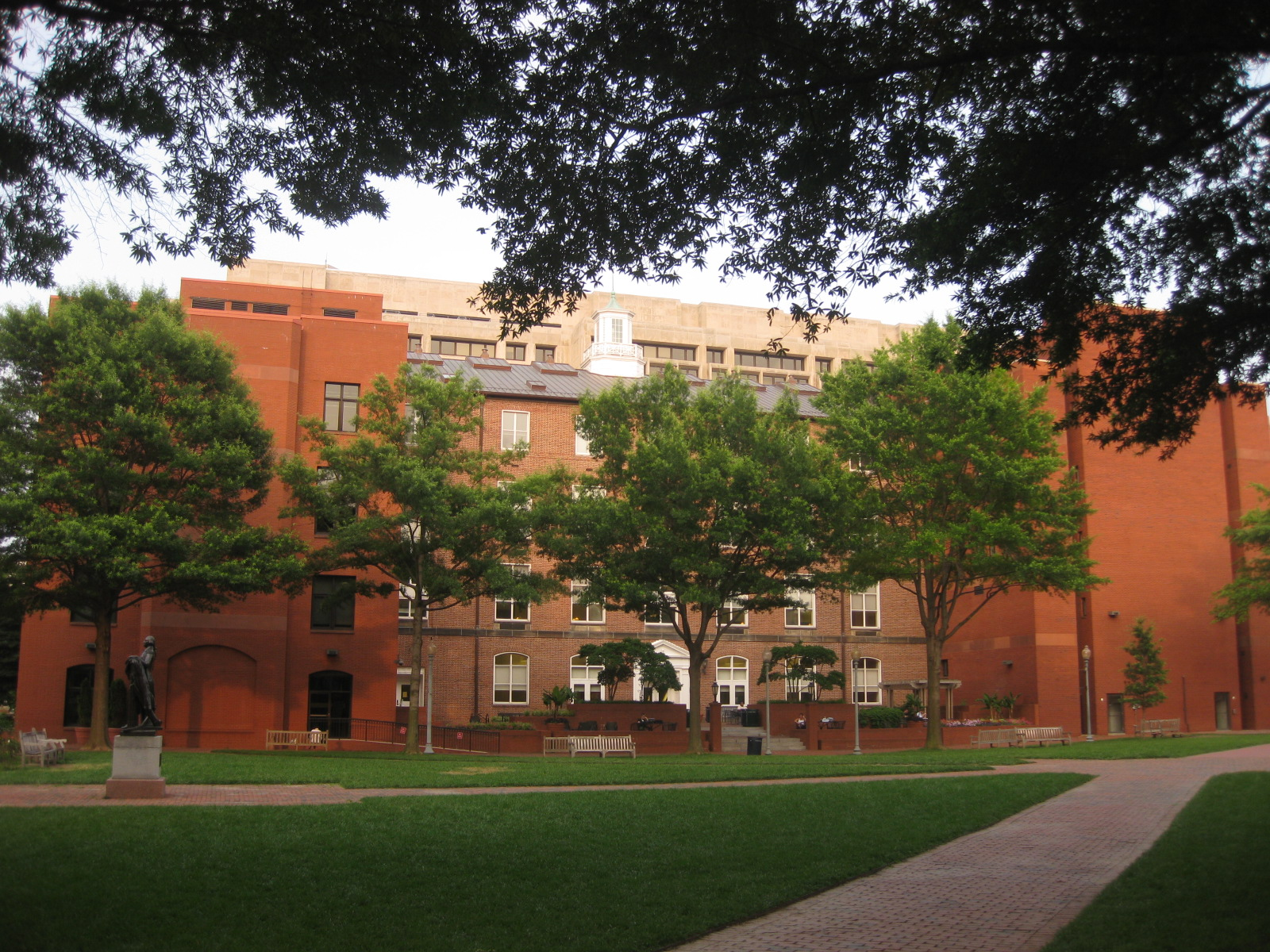
- Stockton Hall is flanked by two post modern classroom buildings.

- Location within Washington, D.C.
- Location: 720 20th St., NW; Washington, D.C.
- Coordinates: 38°53′57″N 77°2′43″W
- Area: less than one acre
- Built: 1926
- Architect: Albert L. Harris & Arthur B. Heaton
- Architectural style: Colonial Revival
- NRHP reference No.: 90001546
- Added to NRHP: September 13, 1991

Stockton Hall is a building on the campus of George Washington University in Washington, D.C. It was listed on the District of Columbia Inventory of Historic Sites in 1987 and on the National Register of Historic Places in 1991.

== History ==
The building was designed by Albert L. Harris and Arthur B. Heaton in the Colonial Revival style and completed in 1926. Wardman Construction Company built the structure. It was the second building built on the Foggy Bottom campus after Corcoran Hall. The structure is named after Charles Herbert Stockton, a Rear Admiral in the United States Navy who served as the GW President from 1910 to 1918. It serves the George Washington University Law School.

== Architecture ==
Stockton Hall is a concrete and steel frame structure covered in red brick and sandstone. A cupola is featured in the center of the roof. It is similar in style to Corcoran Hall, across University Yard to the west. It rises four-stories from the ground. The building is flanked by two classroom buildings that were built in the post modern style.

== See also ==
- H.B. Burns Memorial Building
- Fulbright Hall
- Madison Hall
- Munson Hall
- Jacqueline Bouvier Kennedy Onassis Hall
- Hattie M. Strong Residence Hall
