= Robert O. Scholz =

American architect (1895–1978)

Robert O Scholz
- Born: September 25, 1895; New York City
- Died: July 8, 1978 (aged 82); Washington, D.C.
- Education: Armour Institute
- Occupation: Architect
- Spouse: Frances B. Scholz
- Children: Roberta G. Logie
- Buildings: Alban Towers; Arlington Forest Historic District; The Keystone; Milton Hall; Munson Hall

Robert O. Scholz (1895–1978) was an American architect from Washington, D.C., who is considered one of the city's most important Art Deco designers. A native of New York City, his German parents later moved to Chicago, where he studied at the Armour Institute. Scholz briefly served during World War I before moving to Washington, D.C. He worked as an engineer and draftsman before starting his own architectural firm in 1922.

Scholz worked with business partner David A. Baer to design and construct over 100 buildings in the Washington, D.C. area, including several large apartment buildings like Alban Towers. His transition to designing Art Deco buildings began with The Keystone, one of three former apartment buildings in Foggy Bottom he designed that are on the National Register of Historic Places. In addition to residential structures, Scholz designed houses, warehouses, gas stations, and office buildings. During his later years he was involved with several financial institutions, most notably as vice president of the Perpetual Building Association.

== Biography ==
=== Early life ===
Robert O. Scholz was born on September 25, 1895, in New York City. His parents, William and Marie, were recent emigrants from Germany. When he was young Scholz's family moved to Chicago where he attended elementary school and three years of high school. During this time his father painted china for the Marshall Field Company. Scholz later attended the Armour Institute from 1911 to 1914 but did not graduate. After leaving the Armour Institute Scholz he worked as a draftsman for Chicago architect H. Clyde Miller from 1914 to 1917 followed by one year as an engineer for the Kalman Steel Company. During World War I Scholz served in the Navy and later moved to Washington, D.C., where he worked as an engineer for the Bureau of Yards and Docks until 1920.

=== Career ===
==== Early years ====
In 1920 Scholz began working as an architect for Howard Etchison, a Washington, D.C. real estate developer who built apartment buildings from 1910 to 1925. The following year Scholz joined the office of noted architect George N. Ray, whose historic landmark designs include the Old Federal Building in Fairbanks, Alaska, and the B.F. Saul Building, Hill Building, Peyser Building, Riggs–Tompkins Building, and Waggaman-Ray Commercial Row in Washington, D.C.

==== Baer & Scholz ====
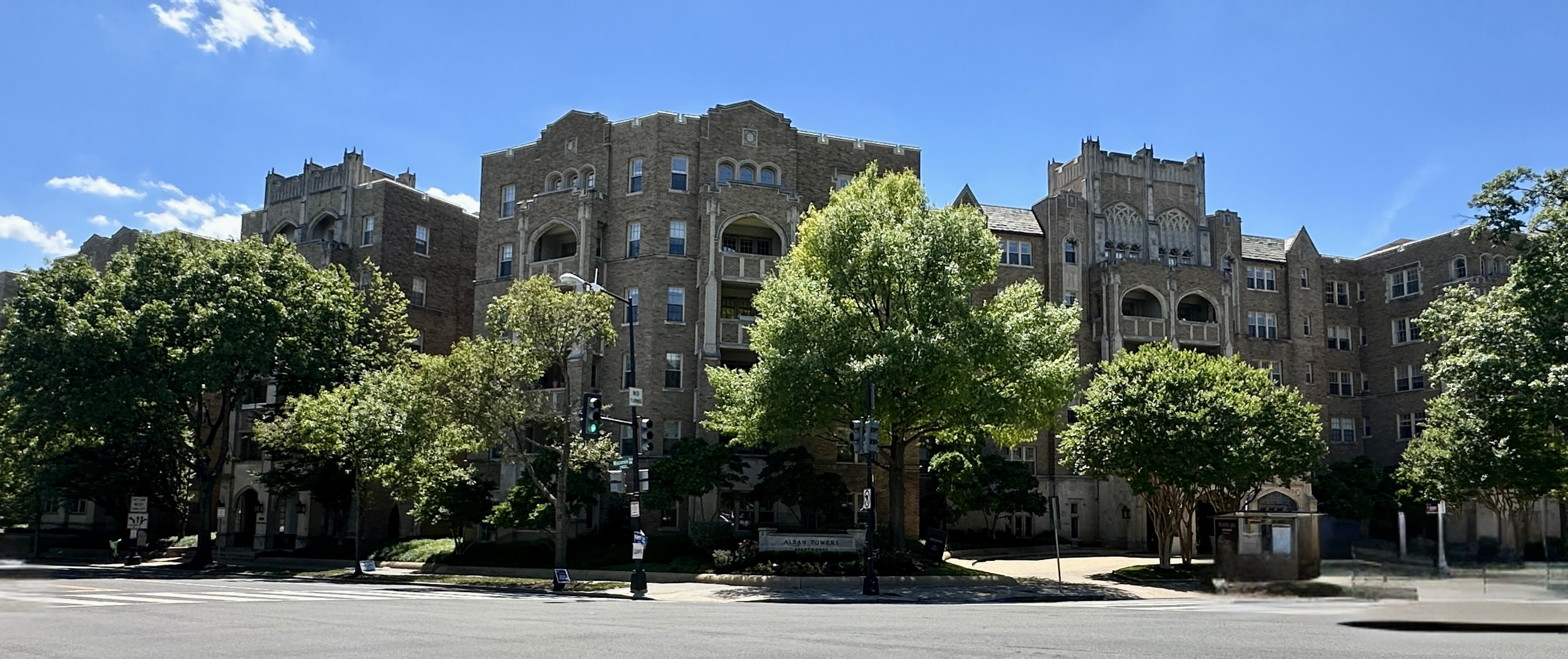
Alban Towers, built in 1928.

In 1922 Scholz started his own architectural firm and began a long business partnership with lawyer and builder David A. Baer. Scholz's younger brother, Oscar, was a draftsman who joined his firm and supervised the construction projects. During the 1920s Scholz and Baer designed and built houses, apartment buildings, and commercial properties throughout Washington, D.C., and are considered one of the city's most important architect and builder teams in the 1920s and early 1930s. Three of their earliest projects were small apartment buildings at 1498 Spring Place NW in Mount Pleasant, 1835 California Street NW in Adams Morgan, and 3432 Connecticut Ave NW in Cleveland Park.

During the next several years the duo would design additional apartment buildings, including The Klingle at 2755 Macomb Street NW in Cleveland Park, and three in Cathedral Heights: The Fleetwood at 3707 Woodley Road NW, Bishop's House at 3010 Wisconsin Avenue NW, and The Archer at 3701 Massachusetts Avenue NW. Examples of houses Scholz & Baer designed and built during these years include the Classical Revival townhomes at 1806-1818 24th Street NW in Kalorama. Scholz resided at 1810 24th Street NW for a time. Projects the two designed and built that have since been demolished include the Blackstone Hotel at 1016 17th Street NW and an apartment building at 815 18th Street NW.

Scholz and Baer's most well known project is the Alban Towers, a large apartment building sited on one of the city's highest points. It was constructed in 1928 and cost $1,500,000 to build. Two wings added in 1930 cost an additional $400,000. Similar to the Washington National Cathedral which is across the street, Alban Towers was designed with a mixture of Gothic Revival and Tudor Revival elements. The apartment building sits on a prominent corner, the intersection of Massachusetts and Wisconsin Avenues.

Scholz still designed buildings on his own during his partnership with Baer, including houses and smaller projects like gas stations and restaurants. The duo's last major project together demonstrated a change in architectural style that Scholz would repeat throughout the next decade and earn him the distinction of being one of the city's most prominent Art Deco architects. Similar to Alban Towers, The Keystone was a large apartment building constructed on a prominent corner, 22nd Street and Pennsylvania Avenue NW in Foggy Bottom. Constructed in 1931, Scholz incorporated new building materials into The Keystone, including aluminum panels, a key design feature of the Art Deco style. During their 12-year partnership from 1922 to 1934, Scholz and Baer designed and constructed 122 buildings.

==== Robert O. Scholz Company ====
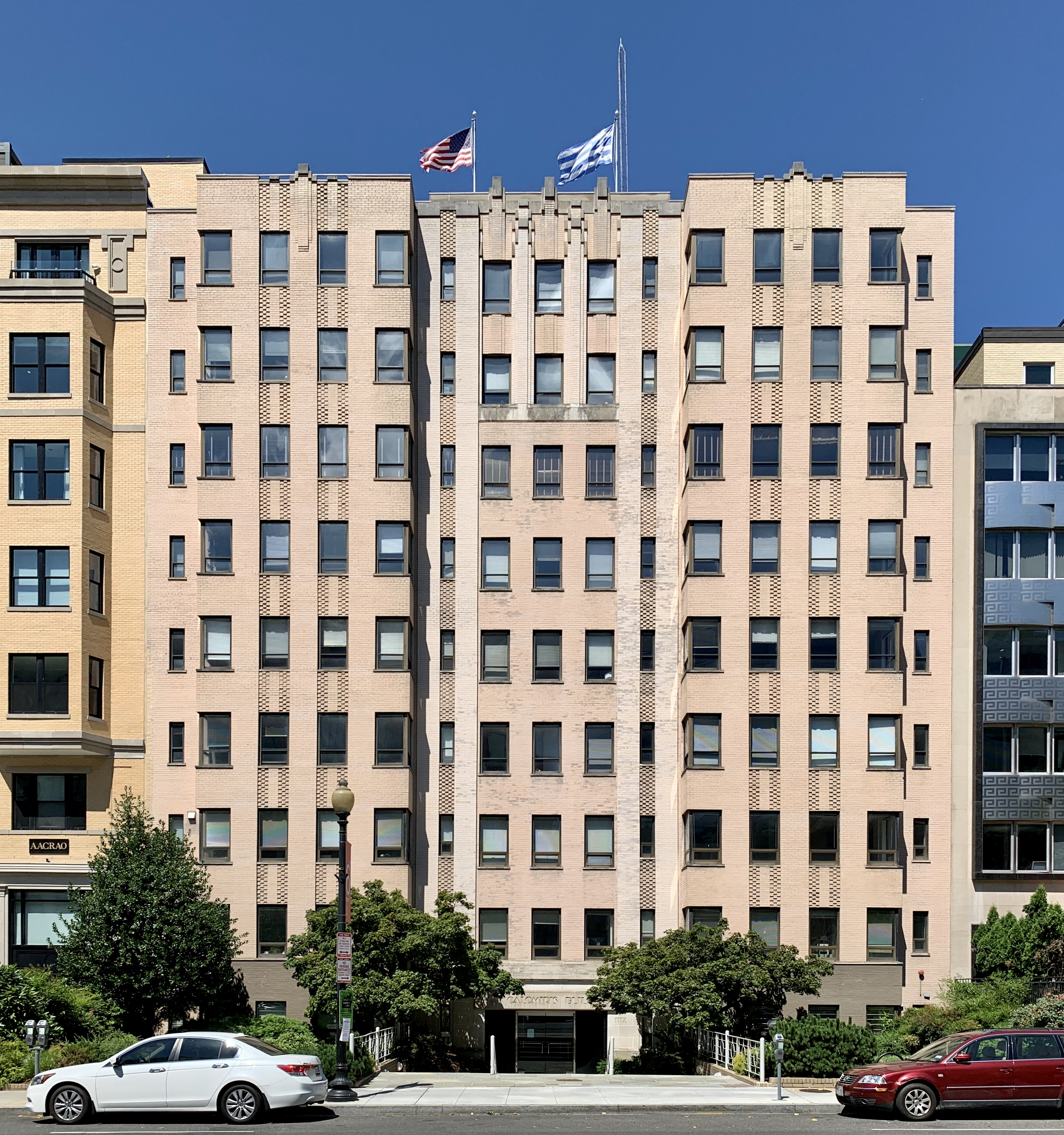
The Pall Mall, built in 1940.

In 1934 Scholz opened his own office in the Edmonds Building, where Baer also had his office, and founded the Robert O. Scholz Company, Inc., with help from his brother and a draftsman. During the next several years Scholz became well known for his Art Deco designs, many of which were apartment buildings. He also designed additional commercial projects during these years, including garages, office buildings, shops, and warehouses. In addition to these commercial projects, Scholz continued designing houses, including the 14 townhomes at 3821–3847 Calvert Street NW in Glover Park, the originally platted homes in the Arlington Forest subdivision, and smaller apartment buildings that were not designed in the Art Deco style, including 1834–1842 M Street NE in Carver Langston and 3323 16th Street NW in Mount Pleasant. Similar to his partnership with Baer, Scholz was also involved in not just the design but also construction of buildings. One of these projects was the Massachusetts Avenue Parking Shops, which Scholz's company built in 1936 and E. Burton Corning designed.

Art Deco apartments Scholz designed in the mid-to-late 1930s include the Park Marconi at 3150 16th Street NW in Mount Pleasant, The Eddystone at 1301 Vermont Avenue NW in Logan Circle, and The Bay State at 1701 Massachusetts Avenue NW in Dupont Circle. Two neighboring Art Deco buildings he designed during that time that are similar in appearance are The Munson at 2212 I Street NW in Foggy Bottom and The Milton at 2222 I Street NW.

The last two large apartment buildings Scholz designed in the city were constructed in 1940. The Pall Mall at 1112 16th Street NW, located near the White House, and the General Scott, located on Scott Circle, were both built in the Art Deco style. The General Scott was one of the first air-conditioned apartment buildings constructed in Washington, D.C. His last major apartment project, the Pooks Hill Apartments, was built in Bethesda, Maryland in 1949.

Most of the buildings Scholz designed in the 1940s and 1950s were commercial properties, including the World Center Building in 1949. He designed office buildings for the Perpetual Building Association (PBA), a savings and loan institution where Scholz served as vice president. The PBA headquarters, built in 1953, was located at 12th and E Street NW but has since been demolished. The PBA branch in Silver Spring, Maryland, was built in 1958 and is located at 8700 Georgia Avenue.

=== Later years ===
In 1954 Scholz's only child, Roberta, was married at the National Presbyterian Church. That same year his brother and business partner, Oscar, died. Following Oscar's death, Scholz was mostly involved with oil drilling investments and his work at the PBA, where he served on the board of directors until 1975. He also served as a member of the Metropolitan Washington Board of Trade and a board member of the Union National Bank of Washington.

Scholz was an active member of the Annapolis Yacht Club and Corinthian Yacht Club, having been involved with yachting groups for several decades. His passion for sailing had continued even after a near-fatal experience on his yacht, Good Hope, which had become disabled during a storm at sea. He and four other passengers spent several days adrift before being rescued by the Coast Guard.

Scholz died on July 8, 1978, at the age of 82. He had resided at the Wisconsin Avenue Nursing Home where he died from congestive heart failure. Several of his apartment designs were later added to the National Register of Historic Places (NRHP): Alban Towers (1994), The Keystone (2010), Milton Hall (2010), and Munson Hall (2010). The Arlington Forest Historic District, added to the NRHP in 2005, is a subdivision in Arlington, Virginia, that was built from 1939 to 1948 and features Colonial Revival homes designed by Scholz.

== Selected works ==
- 1498 Spring Place NW (1922)
- 1835 California Street NW (1922)
- 3432 Connecticut Ave NW (1922)
- 1806–1818 24th Street NW (1924)
- 2755 Macomb Street NW (1926)
- 3707 Woodley Road NW (1926)
- 3701 Massachusetts Avenue NW (1926)
- 3010 Wisconsin Avenue NW (1927)
- Alban Towers (1928)
- The Keystone (1931)
- 2600 Connecticut Avenue NW (1935)
- 3821–3847 Calvert Street NW (1935)
- 3150 16th Street NW (1936)
- 1834–1842 M Street NE
- 7331 14th Street NW (1936)
- 2509–2515 39th Street NW (1936)
- 1301 Vermont Avenue NW (1937)
- 3323 16th Street NW (1937)
- The Munson (1937)
- The Milton (1938)
- 1701 Massachusetts Avenue NW (1939)
- 1112 16th Street NW (1940)
- 1 Scott Circle NW (1941)
- 1708 Good Hope Road SE (1946)
- Pooks Hill Apartments (1949)
- 1600 K Street NW (1949)
- 8700 Georgia Avenue (1958)
