= Medical Faculty Associates =

The GW Medical Faculty Associates
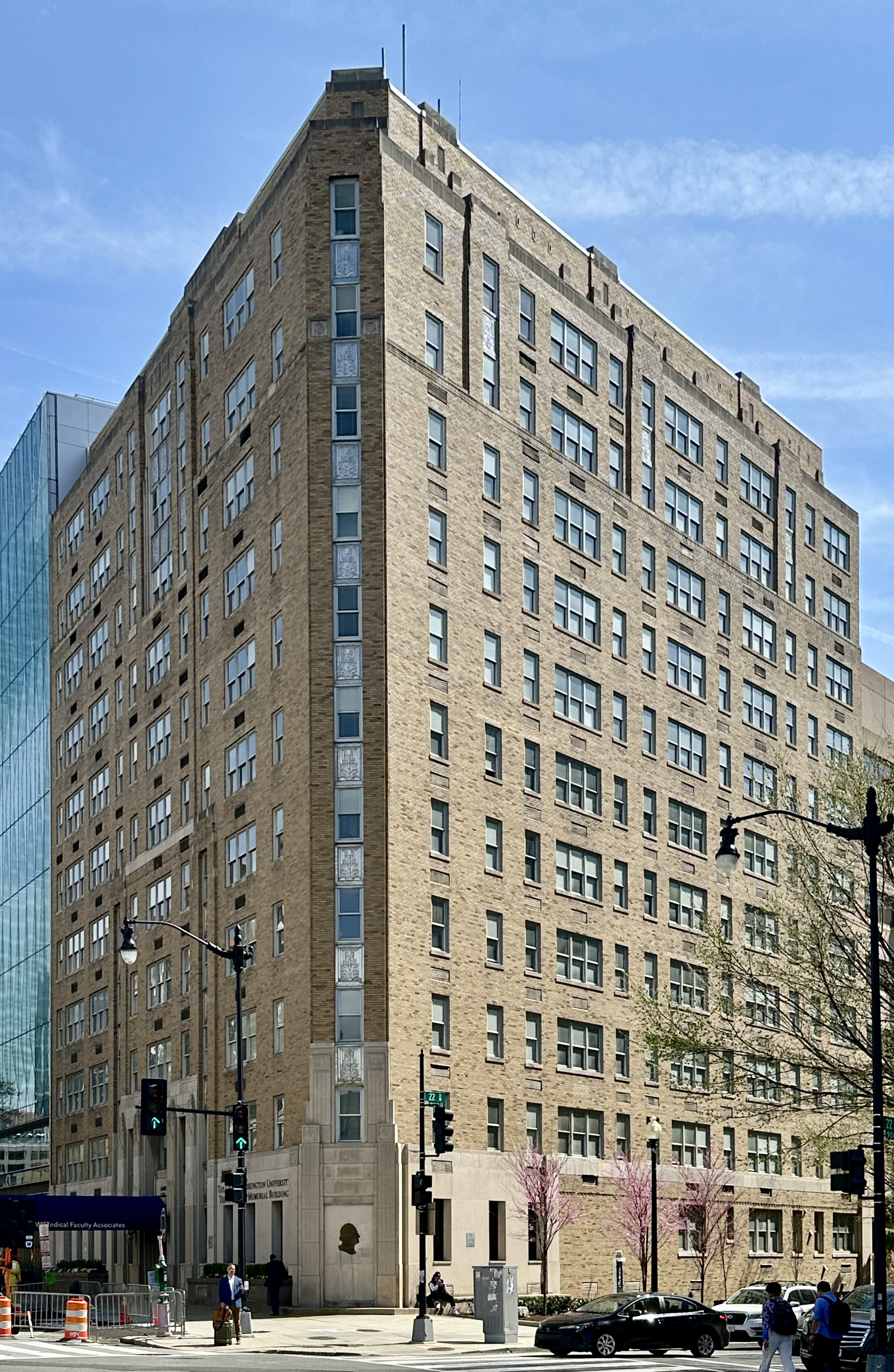
- MFA is located in the former Keystone apartment building
- Abbreviation: GW MFA
- Formation: George Washington University
- Headquarters: 2150 Pennsylvania Avenue, NW Washington D.C. 20037
- Location: Washington, D.C, United States
- CEO: Bill Elliott
- Website: www.gwdocs.com

The George Washington University Medical Faculty Associates (MFA) is a non-profit 501(c)3 physician group practice affiliated with the George Washington University. The MFA group practice is made up of academic clinical faculty of the GW Medical School. As of 2015, the group had more than 750 physicians providing medical services to the Washington DC, Northern Virginia, and Maryland areas. The GW Medical Faculty Associates offers over 51 specialty areas of care. The organization is a partner with the George Washington University Hospital and the School of Medicine and Health Sciences.

Robert Kelly became CEO in January 2017 and left in 2020. Stephen Badger left the post in September 2015 after 16 years with MFA. Barbara L. Bass was CEO from 2020-2024 and was succeeded by William "Bill" Elliott in October 2024.

== Centers and Institutes ==
The GW Breast Care Center, the Dr. Cyrus and Myrtle Katzen Cancer Research Center, and the GW Heart & Vascular Institute are headquartered at the GW MFA.

Within the Department of Emergency Medicine is Innovative Practice. Housed within Innovative Practice are the GW Training Center, the Worldwide Emergency Communications Center, and the GW Operational/Event Medicine. The GW Training Center offers EMT classes year-round, in addition to other emergency medicine-related courses. The Worldwide Emergency Communications Center operates a call center that provides telemedicine services globally. GW Operational/Event Medicine is an ALS Special Event EMS agency, providing standby and event medical services/solutions throughout the District of Columbia.

== Expansion ==
In the past, Howard University was a partner of the GW Medical Faculty Associates. Around 200 physicians have since left since the termination of the partnership.

In April 2015, the Medical Faculty Associates announced the acquisition of Metro Immediate and Primary Care (Metro IPC). Metro IPC offers 365-day-a-year service at three locations within Washington DC.

As of 2024, MFA is scheduled to offer services at the 365,000-square foot Cedar Hill Regional Medical Center being constructed in Southeast Washington DC.
