= The Keystone (Washington, D.C.) =

- U.S. National Register of Historic Places
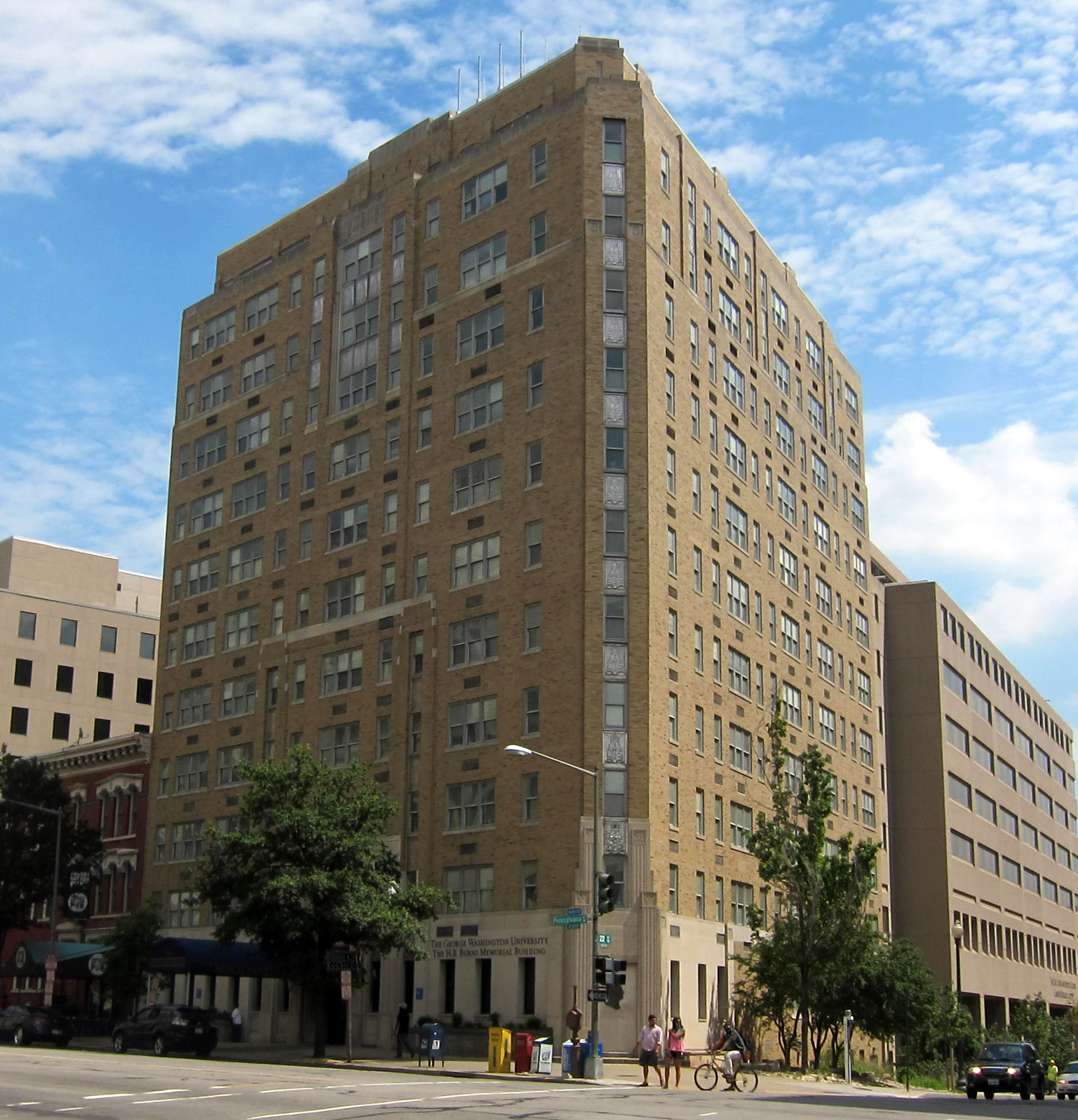

- Location within Washington, D.C.
- Location: 2150 Pennsylvania Ave, NW; Washington, D.C.
- Coordinates: 38°54′6″N 77°2′54″W
- Area: less than one acre
- Built: 1931
- Architect: Robert O. Scholz
- Architectural style: Art Deco
- MPS: Apartment Buildings in Washington, DC, MPS
- NRHP reference No.: 10000370
- Added to NRHP: June 18, 2010

The Keystone, also known as the H.B. Burns Memorial Building and Medical Faculty Associates, is a building on the campus of George Washington University in Washington, D.C. It was listed on the District of Columbia Inventory of Historic Sites and the National Register of Historic Places in 2010. The building is home to the George Washington University Medical Faculty Associates.

== History ==
The building was designed by Robert O. Scholz in the Art Deco style and completed in 1931. It is a twelve-story building that was formerly known as The Keystone apartment building. It was acquired by the university and dedicated on February 15, 1971, as the University Clinic, or Burns Clinic. It was named in honor of H.B. Burns, the deceased brother of Jacob Burns.

== Architecture ==
The Burns Memorial Building is similar in massing to the nearby Munson Hall and Jacqueline Bouvier Kennedy Onassis Hall. The exterior of the building is faced with yellow brick and cast stone. Metal panels that feature decorative scrollwork are found below the windows and above the main entrance.

== See also ==
- Corcoran Hall
- Fulbright Hall
- Madison Hall
- Stockton Hall
- Hattie M. Strong Residence Hall
