= Joel Broyhill =

American politician (1919–2006)

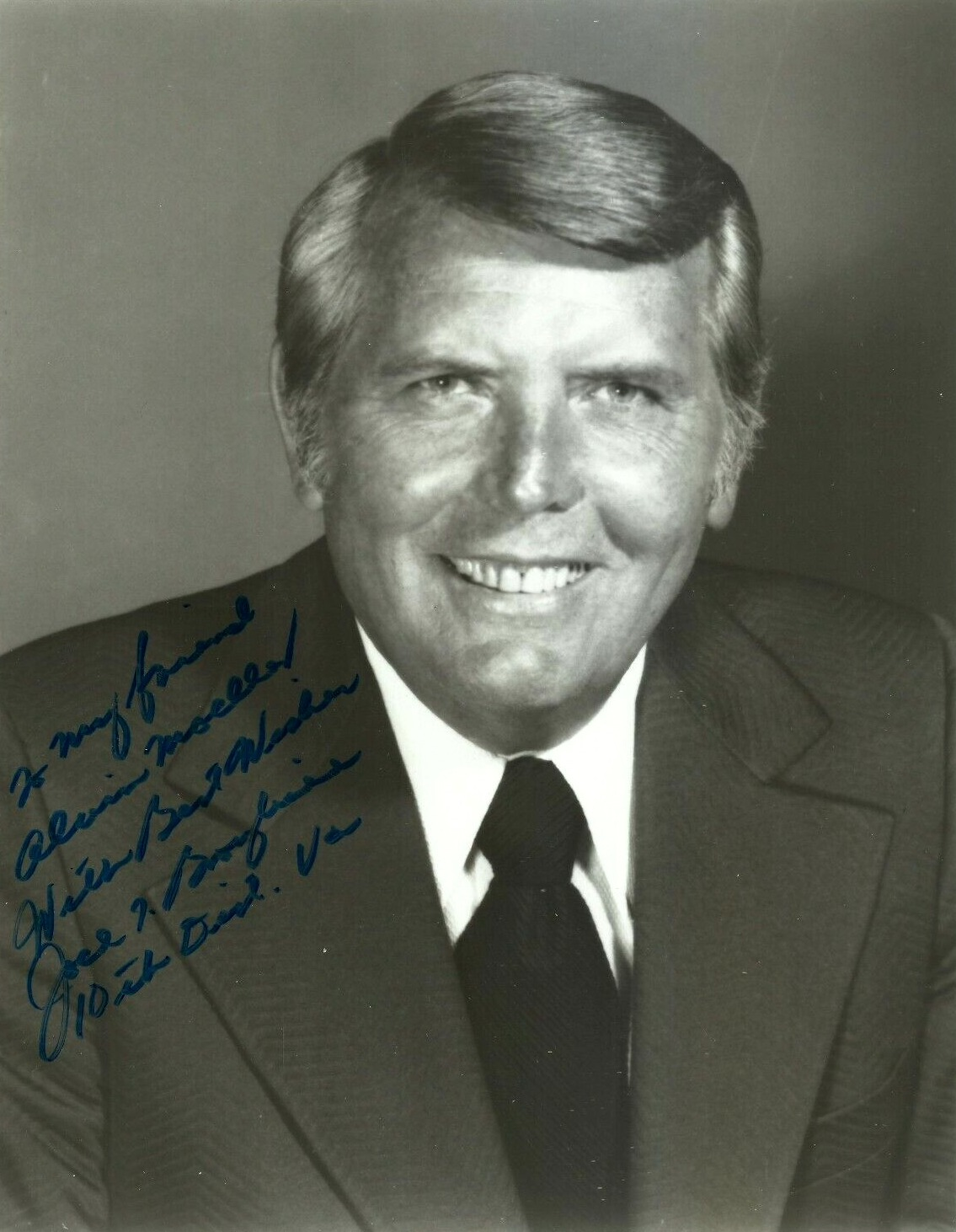
- Broyhill c. 1969

Member of the U.S. House of Representatives from Virginia's 10th district
- In office January 3, 1953 – December 31, 1974
- Preceded by: District established
- Succeeded by: Joseph L. Fisher

Personal details
- Born: Joel Thomas Broyhill; November 4, 1919 Hopewell, Virginia, U.S.
- Died: September 24, 2006 (aged 86) Arlington, Virginia, U.S.
- Resting place: Arlington National Cemetery
- Party: Republican

Joel Thomas Broyhill (November 4, 1919 – September 24, 2006) was an American military officer, businessman and Republican Party politician who represented Virginia in the United States House of Representatives from 1953 until 1974.

He was elected in 1952 from Virginia's 10th congressional district, a district consisting of Washington, D.C. suburbs in and around Arlington and Fairfax County. During his eleven terms in office, Broyhill was known for his constituent services and advocacy for federal workers, as well as his opposition to racial desegregation during the 1950s and 1960s.

== Early life and education ==
Although according to family genealogy, the first Broyhill emigrated to Halifax County, Virginia, in the 18th century, Joel Broyhill's grandfather, Thomas Jefferson Broyhill (1852–1935) had been born near Moravian Falls in Wilkes County, North Carolina, the son of William Broyhill, a farmer and miller who also taught school following the Civil War. Thomas Broyhill became a carpenter and millwright, then leading citizen of the area as he established sawmills and other businesses. Joel's father Marvin Talmadge Broyhill Sr. moved his family to Hopewell, Virginia, to follow an uncle who worked for the DuPont Powder Company. M.T. Broyhill occasionally worked for DuPont, as well as established a real estate business which thrived until the plant closed. At the age of eighteen, Broyhill moved to Arlington, Virginia, when his father relocated his building and real estate firm, M.T. Broyhill & Sons Corporation (in part developing housing near Front Royal, Virginia, where DuPont established a cellulose factory). He then attended George Washington University from 1939 to 1941.

== Military service and real estate career ==
In February 1942, Joel Broyhill enlisted in the United States Army. He served in European Theater as a captain in the 106th Infantry Division. He narrowly escaped death when Allied planes bombed the Nazis, and suffered what proved to be lifetime partial hearing loss from the explosions. Captured by the Germans during the Battle of the Bulge, Broyhill escaped six months later from a prisoner-of-war camp and rejoined advancing U.S. forces. He was released from active duty November 1, 1945. Among his military awards was a Bronze Star Medal.

After the war, Broyhill and his brother M.T. Broyhill Jr. returned from military service and rejoined their father's real estate firm, where Joel became partner and general manager. By 1952, the firm was building three thousand homes a year, and became the second largest customer for General Electric appliances. The parents, Joel's family and M.T. Jr.'s family lived in three houses next door to each other in Arlington, Virginia near North 26th and Vermont Streets, although this man moved his family to a mansion on Old Dominion Drive in 1967.

== Politics ==
He was president of the Arlington County Chamber of Commerce and chairman of the Arlington County Planning Commission. In 1950 he was elected president of the Arlington Republican Club.

=== Elected to Congress ===
In 1952 he ran for Congress in a bid to become the first representative of Virginia's new 10th district, located in the inner suburbs of Washington, D.C. Broyhill won on his 33rd birthday, defeating Democrat Edmund D. Campbell by 322 votes and riding the coattails of the Dwight D. Eisenhower and Republican Party landslide that year. He won his next ten elections but lost during the Democratic landslide in 1974 in the wake of the Watergate scandal and the resignation of President Richard Nixon. Broyhill's district had been carved out of the old 8th district, then represented by Howard W. "Judge" Smith, a legendary and powerful Democrat who controlled legislation through his chairmanship of the House Rules Committee. The Washington Post wrote

Although of different political parties, Mr. Broyhill and Smith shared a conservative political ideology, and the veteran Rules Committee chairman took an avuncular interest in the new congressman, teaching him many tricks of the legislative trade. In this relationship, the two men reflected a trend that in years to come would be of singular significance in the politics of the South: the passing of the conservative mantle and the power that went with it from Old Guard Democrats to a new generation of Southern Republicans.

=== Congressional career ===
After taking office, Broyhill developed a reputation for assisting federal employees, as well as constituent service that became legendary. A messenger came to his office every 30 minutes to pick up the Western Union telegrams his office would fire off to government agencies on behalf of constituents.

The Washington Post wrote:

As a lawmaker, Mr. Broyhill was best known for local matters. He sponsored legislation that led to the construction of the Roosevelt and Woodrow Wilson bridges across the Potomac River and the second span of the 14th Street Bridge. He also sponsored a measure that led to the widening of Shirley Highway. He fought for better pay and working conditions for federal employees, federal aid to local school systems and financial support for Metro. He was an unrelenting and outspoken opponent of home rule for the District, arguing that the U.S. Constitution placed ultimate responsibility for the nation's capital with Congress, and he battled for years against measures to increase the authority of city residents to manage D.C. affairs. For these efforts he was bitterly criticized by D.C. leaders, who ascribed racial motives to his opposition to self-government for the majority-black city. But he won widespread support in Northern Virginia, where his stand was interpreted as a first line of defense against any attempt by the city to levy taxes on suburban commuters. He supported the 23rd Amendment to the Constitution, which allowed D.C. residents to vote for president and vice president, and the 26th Amendment, which gave 18-year-olds the right to vote. He also backed aid to grandparents who cared for their grandchildren.

Broyhill served on the powerful House Ways and Means Committee, as well as the House Post Office and Civil Service Committee. In 1963, he was joined in the House by his distant cousin Jim Broyhill, also a Republican and who had won an unexpected victory in North Carolina's 9th congressional district, and who would also become known for his constituent services. Congressman Frank Wolf later noted:

According to the Almanac of American Politics in 1972, and I quote, they said, "There were few offices that took care of constituents' needs and complaints with more efficiency." Congressman Broyhill estimated that he aided more than 100,000 10th Congressional District residents in his 20-plus year service in office. The almanac also describes Congressman Broyhill as a Member of Congress and says that he "should be credited with voting his conscience".

On national issues, Broyhill supported the Republican legislative programs of Eisenhower and Nixon. In the Democratic administrations of John F. Kennedy and Lyndon B. Johnson, he opposed programs of the New Frontier and the Great Society.

Broyhill also became known as a strident opponent of integration. In 1955, he was one 81 US Representatives who vowed to oppose by "every lawful means", the U.S. Supreme Court holding in Brown v. Board of Education which outlawed segregation. He and Richard Harding Poff of Virginia were two of only four Republicans to sign the Southern Manifesto. Broyhill voted against the Civil Rights Acts of 1957, 1960, 1964, and 1968, and the Voting Rights Act of 1965, but voted in favor of the 24th Amendment to the U.S. Constitution. As a longtime member of the committee overseeing the District of Columbia he, along with three other members of Congress, recommended that schools in the District reinstitute segregation.

Broyhill in 1972 voiced opposition towards the federal subsidization of housing in Washington, D.C. suburbs, lamenting that it "smacks of forced integration".

In 1974 he announced his intention to retire, but was persuaded to seek another term at the request of Vice President Gerald R. Ford. He ended up losing to Democrat Joseph L. Fisher, as the GOP suffered landslide defeats in reaction to the Watergate scandal. His defeat was considered one of the biggest upsets nationally that year.

After leaving office, he served as campaign manager for Republican John W. Warner's successful first run for U.S. Senate in the 1978 election, but primarily he was involved with real estate. His firm developed several neighborhoods in Northern Virginia, including Broyhill McLean Estates, Broyhill Forest, and Sterling Park.

== Death and legacy ==
Broyhill died at his home in Arlington, Virginia, of congestive heart failure and pneumonia on September 24, 2006. He is buried at Arlington National Cemetery. In 2000, Congress named the postal building at 8409 Lee Hwy. in Merrifield, Virginia, after Broyhill, though no plaque remains in public areas. His papers are held among the special collections of George Mason University.

U.S. House of Representatives
| New district | Member of the U.S. House of Representatives from Virginia's 10th congressional district January 3, 1953 – December 31, 1974 | Succeeded by Joseph L. Fisher |
