= Alban Towers =

Apartment building in Washington, D.C.

- Alban Towers Apartment Building
- U.S. National Register of Historic Places
- D.C. Inventory of Historic Sites
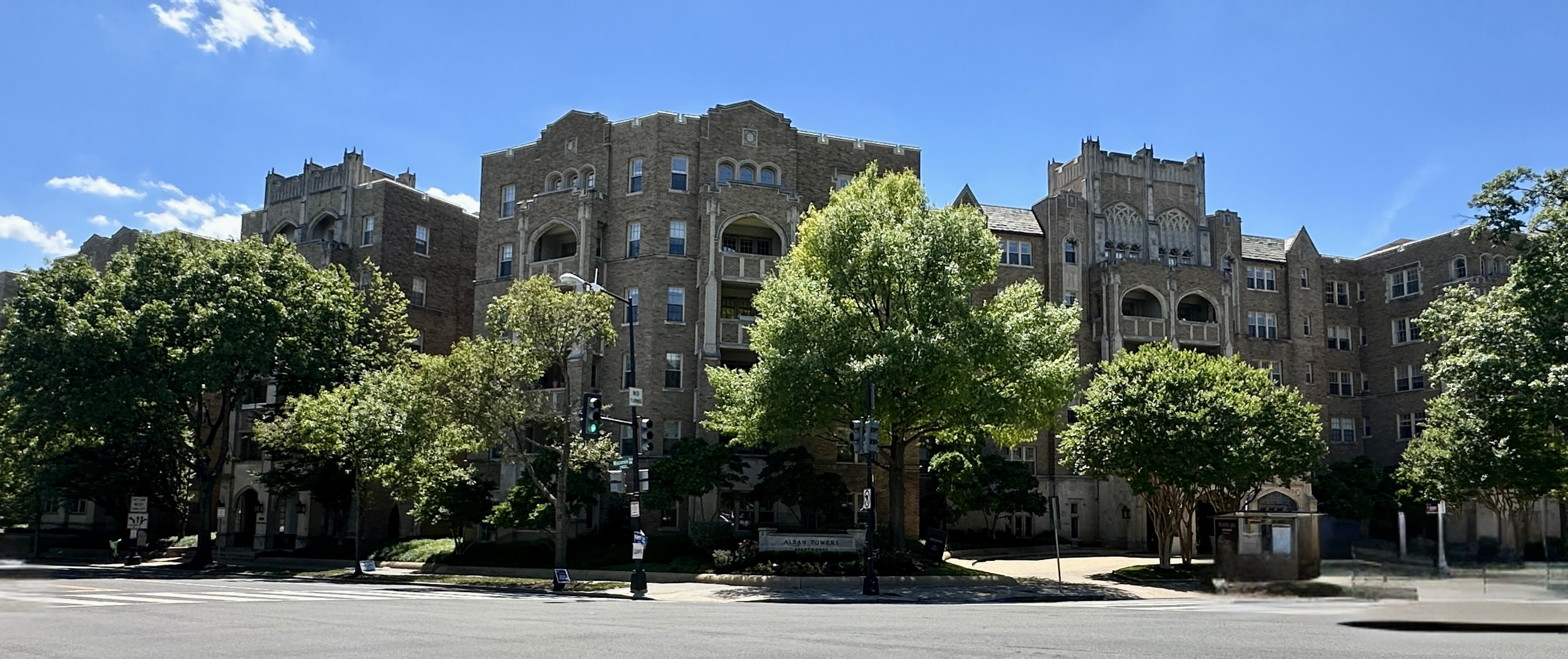
- Alban Towers in 2026

- Location within Washington, D.C.
- Location: 3700 Massachusetts Ave. NW., Washington, D.C., United States
- Coordinates: 38°55′43″N 77°4′26″W
- Area: 1.5 acres (0.61 ha)
- Built: 1928; 98 years ago
- Built by: David A. Baer
- Architect: Robert O. Scholz
- Architectural style: Tudor Revival, Late Gothic Revival
- MPS: Apartment Buildings in Washington, DC, MPS
- NRHP reference No.: 94001040

Significant dates
- Added to NRHP: September 9, 1994
- Designated DCIHS: May 15, 1991

Alban Towers is an apartment building on Massachusetts Avenue in Northwest Washington, D.C. It is located at the intersection of Massachusetts Avenue (Embassy Row) and Wisconsin Avenue; it occupies the 221,000 square foot (21,000 m²) block between those two avenues and Garfield Street, Cathedral Avenue, and 38th Street. Diagonally from the Massachusetts-Wisconsin intersection is the St. Albans School, which occupies the southwestern corner of the grounds of the Washington National Cathedral. It is listed in the National Register of Historic Places, and is considered to be one of the best examples of Gothic Revival architecture in Washington.

== History ==
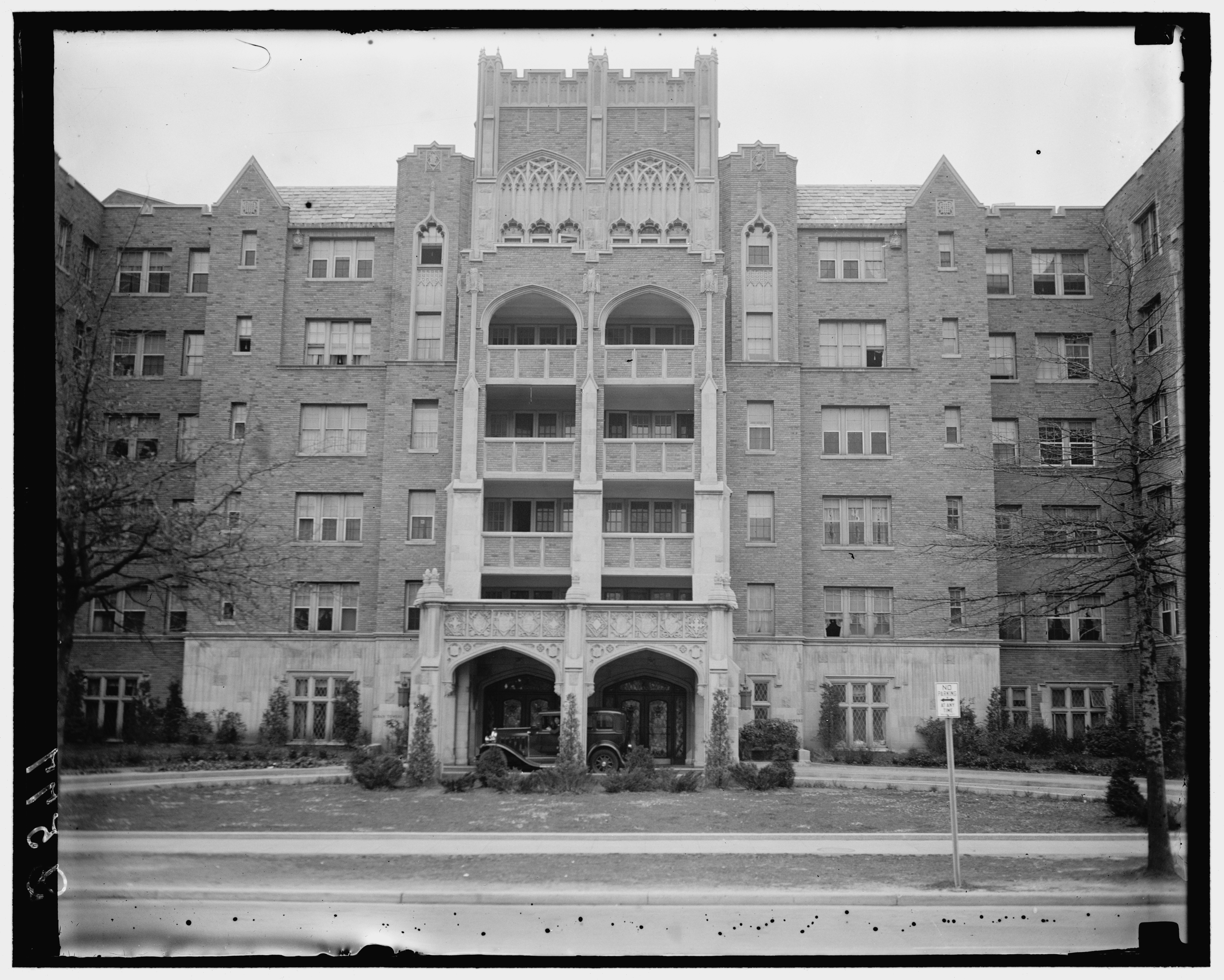
Alban Towers in 1937

The land Alban Towers is situated on was purchased by its developer from Washington National Cathedral in the early 1920s. It opened in 1929 as the largest apartment building in Washington, D.C. By today's standards, however, it is modest in size with a height of six stories.

Its prominent architect/developer team, Robert O. Scholz, designer, David A. Baer, builder, designed the building in the Gothic Revival with tan-colored brick and limestone employed to simulate the monochrome composition of Gothic style architecture. The design was selected because it was popular in the 1920s and because it would complement the Washington National Cathedral. (Scholz & Baer together were responsible for the construction of at least eight apartment buildings between 1922 and 1931. As a result, they earned a reputation as one of the more important apartment house architect/developer teams of the post-World War I decade. Representing the product of the collaboration, both whom specialized in 1920s apartment building construction, Alban Towers reflects the work of notable planners and architects who influenced the evolution of apartment construction in Washington, D.C.)

The lobbies and hallways, with their richly ornamented Gothic/Art Deco elements, were integral to the exterior scheme. Paved in quarry tiles of brown, orange, and ocher laid in a geometric pattern, the lobby is topped by plaster crown molding composed of rope and infilled with alternating roses, acorns, and thistles. These symbols of Great Britain reinforce the English Gothic tenor of the building. The walls of the upper-floor hallways are covered in rough-finished stucco, lending a “sumptuous texture that is rarely found in apartment buildings.”

Billed as an apartment hotel, Alban Towers offered its residents 24-hour maid service and a public dining room. The ground floor of the building has housed a beauty shop, a travel agency, a grocery store, and a lunch counter. Each of the upper floors contained a maid's lounge and a bathroom facility. Constructed during the decade in which apartment construction exceeded that of single-family houses, Alban Towers attempted to compensate for smaller family space by furnishing its tenants with luxurious amenities and public areas. The relative modesty of individual apartments is offset by the grandeur of the public spaces.

Alban Towers was the Washington, D.C. headquarters of supporters of the presidential campaigns of John F. Kennedy, Eugene McCarthy, Richard Nixon, and Ronald Reagan. Its hotel suites were frequented by such celebrities as Bette Davis and Frank Sinatra. During World War II, it was discovered that Japanese spies had used the Alban Towers residence of the Japanese Naval attaché as a lookout point to the city as well as a place to tap into official radio frequencies.

Its apartments were leased by the embassies of Great Britain, Canada, Australia, South Africa, and others to house their diplomats. However during the 1950s, this created controversy when the embassies of the newly independent African states attempted to lease some of its apartments; Washington was still a racially segregated city and the African diplomats were refused residence in Alban Towers and other area apartment buildings. Originally, the building featured 132 units, mostly of lavish one-bedroom apartment homes, as well as a number of hotel suites. In 1930, responding to the large demand for apartment in the building, the number of units was increased by 84 with the construction of an additional two wings on the south side of the building in 1930.

In the 1960s, neglect of the owners to afford proper care and maintenance to the building led to its decline in status. In 1973 it was sold to Georgetown University for use as housing for some 450 students. In the 1980s and 1990s the building fell into a state of serious disrepair. The partnership of Edmonson & Gallagher contracted to purchase the building in 1986, but an association of tenants attempted to exercise a statutory right of first refusal, resulting in clouded title that was not resolved for several years. Sally Berk, president of the DC Preservation League, nominated the building to be an historic landmark in 1990, and it was placed on the National Register of Historic Places in 1994.

In 1995, after the sale to Edmonson had fallen through, Georgetown contracted to sell the building to a partnership led by Starwood. At the time of the sale only 30 apartments in the building were occupied. Starwood paid several tenants to leave their apartments, and paid others to move to temporary housing while renovation work was to be conducted. The building was closed and renovation work began in the summer of 1997, but was stopped shortly thereafter for undisclosed reasons and ultimately abandoned. Finally, in 1999, the building was purchased by Charles E. Smith Co. Residential Realty, which undertook a costly restoration effort. Special attention was paid to the preservation of the building's original architectural elements. The restoration included restoration architects and artisans to ensure that the original character of the building was retained. The exterior, lobby and hallways were restored, while the actual apartments, which were demolished by previous owners, were completely rebuilt to serve modern demands. The total cost of the restoration was $63 million. The building reopened in 2001.

Today, the building provides residence to many diplomats and government officials and to American University students, known to some as The AParty.

== Building ==
Alban Towers' exterior consists of Limestone Tracery, bas-relief panels and brick, and has much Gothic-inspired ornamentation including arched balcony openings, gargoyles, and rising spirals on the roof. The main entrance on Massachusetts Avenue features a crenelated porte-cochere with carved spandrels and corbel stones supporting its gothic arches. Also featured on the porte-cochere are eight carved heads, six male and two female. The heads include one of an aviator inspired by Charles A. Lindbergh's historic flight.

The grand lobby is spacious and designed using Tudor ideals, featuring Tudor strapwork and plaster ceilings. The hallways (which are protected under historic preservation laws) are designed with a rough plaster finish, pointed arches, and sculptural plaster pilasters and brackets. Sculptured plaster arches and panels and friezes in the public corridors resemble the signs of the zodiac.

Today, the building has 229 units in the form of studio and one, two and three bedroom luxury apartments between 486 and 1,521 square feet (141.3 m^{2}) as rental properties. There are two indoor garages for the building's residents; attached and detached. The attached garage is incorporated into the building's basement level and accommodates a limited number of cars. The detached garage is located opposite the building on the building's access drive, and features two underground heated levels of parking spaces. Additionally, the detached garage serves as access to the private garages of a number of luxury townhouses—Alban Row—located above the garage on 38th Street.

The building includes a grand lobby, a party room, fitness center, swimming pool, conference center, business center and rooftop garden.

== Grounds ==
An access drive runs behind the building from Cathedral Avenue to Garfield Street. Originally, a large park was located behind the building, but under the current ownership it was scaled down into a nationally recognized butterfly garden, which was designed in coordination with the Washington Area Butterfly Club. The purpose of the scaling down of the park was to provide land for the Alban Row townhouses, which were built to offset the costs of the expensive restoration of 1999–2001.
