= Munson Hall =

- U.S. National Register of Historic Places
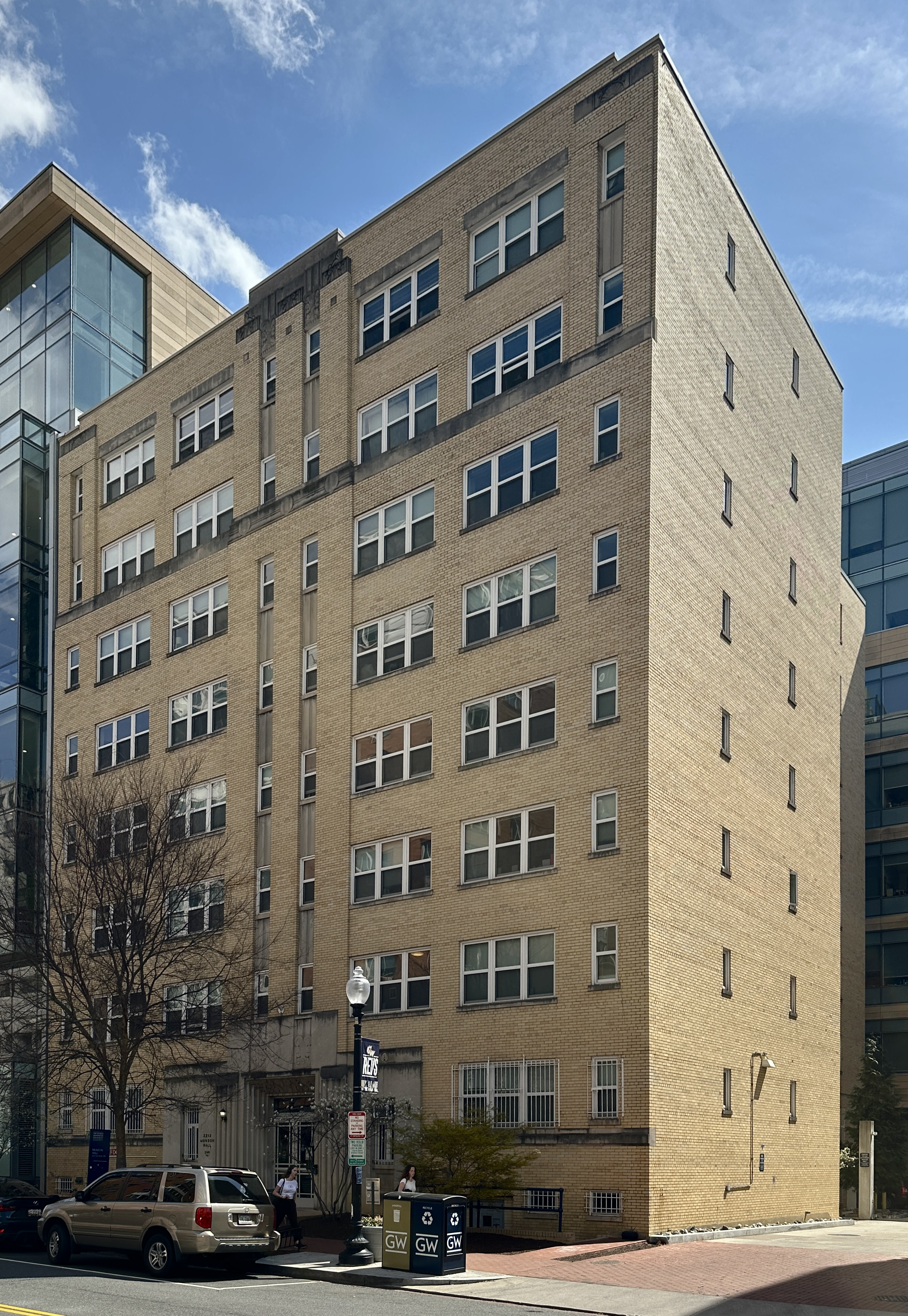
- Munson Hall in 2026

- Location within Washington, D.C.
- Location: 2212 Eye St., NW; Washington, D.C.
- Coordinates: 38°54′2″N 77°2′57″W
- Area: less than one acre
- Built: 1937
- Architect: Robert O. Scholz
- MPS: Apartment Buildings in Washington, DC, MPS
- NRHP reference No.: 10000372
- Added to NRHP: June 18, 2010

Munson Hall is a residence hall on the campus of George Washington University, located at 2212 I St., Northwest, Washington, D.C. in the Foggy Bottom neighborhood.

== History ==
The building was designed by Robert O. Scholz and was built in 1937. It was known as the Munson Hall Apartments and became a residence hall in 1971.

It is an eight-story structure that is similar in style and form as the Jacqueline Bouvier Kennedy Onassis Hall next door. The exterior is covered in buff brick with cast stone detailing. There is a slightly projecting center bay with a recessed entrance with vertical cast stone banding. The entrance also features three medallions and two panels with decorative scroll work.

It was listed on the District of Columbia Inventory of Historic Sites and the National Register of Historic Places in 2010.

== See also ==
- H.B. Burns Memorial Building
- Corcoran Hall
- Fulbright Hall
- Madison Hall
- Stockton Hall
- Hattie M. Strong Residence Hall
