= Jacqueline Bouvier Kennedy Onassis Hall =

- JBKO Hall
- U.S. National Register of Historic Places
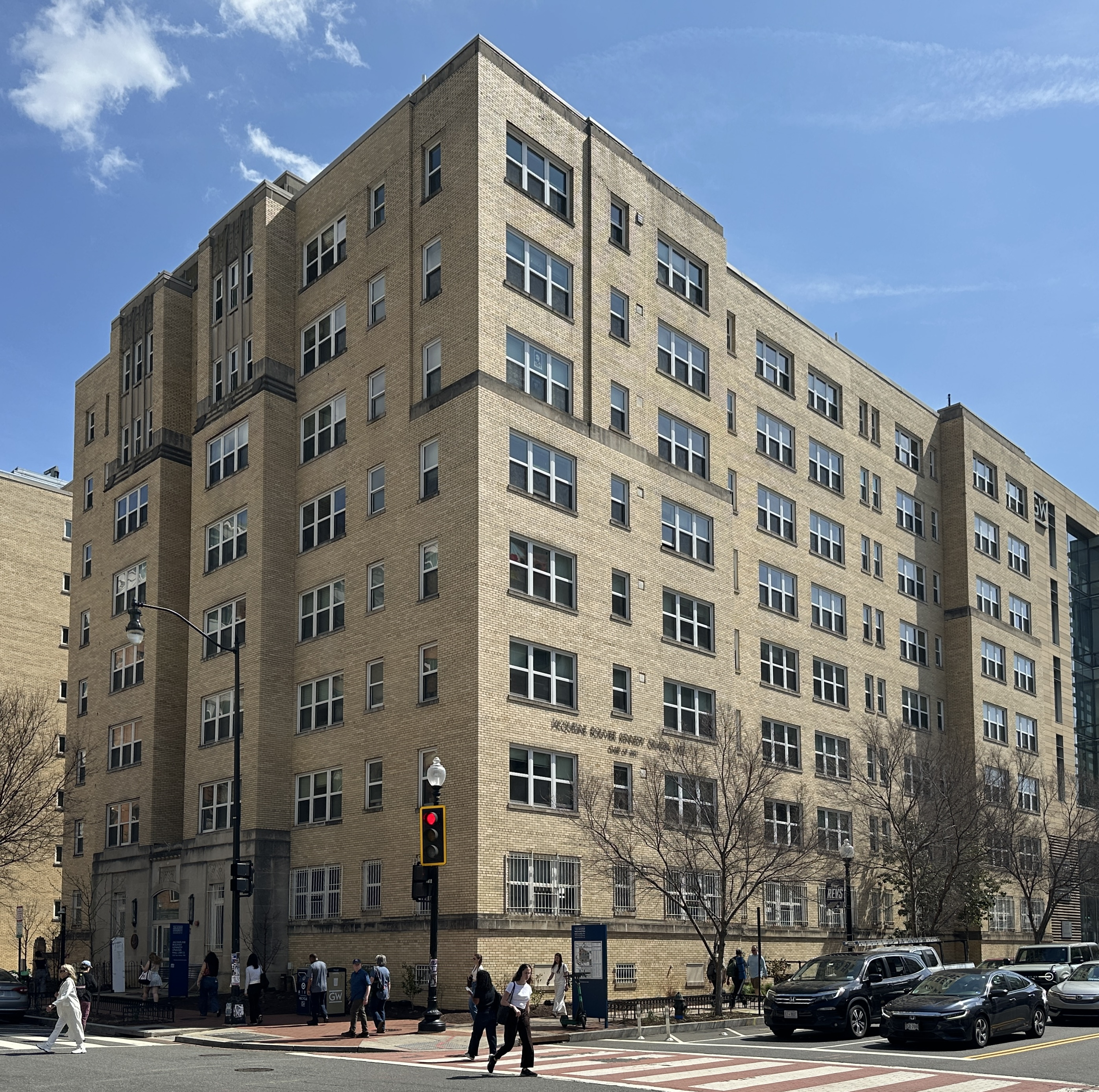
- Jacqueline Bouvier Kennedy Onassis Hall in 2026

- Location within Washington, D.C.
- Location: 2222 I St., NW; Washington, D.C.
- Coordinates: 38°54′2″N 77°2′59″W
- Area: less than one acre
- Built: 1938
- Architect: Robert O. Scholz
- MPS: Apartment Buildings in Washington, DC, MPS
- NRHP reference No.: 10000371
- Added to NRHP: June 18, 2010

Jacqueline Bouvier Kennedy Onassis Hall (formerly known as Milton Hall) is a residence hall on the campus of the George Washington University, in Washington, DC. It is named after GW alumna Jacqueline Bouvier Kennedy Onassis, former First Lady of the United States.

== History ==
The building was designed by Robert O. Scholz and was built in 1938. The building is similar in style as the neighboring Munson Hall. It is eight stories tall, and features two bays. The exterior is faced with buff brick. The main entrance is in the recessed space between the two bays. Cast stone scrollwork is found over the door and surrounding the first floor and eighth floor windows. There are three medallions on each bay along a horizontal cast stone band above the sixth floor. In 1995 the building was named for Jacqueline Bouvier Kennedy Onassis, who graduated from GW in 1951. It was listed on the District of Columbia Inventory of Historic Sites and the National Register of Historic Places in 2010.

== See also ==
- Corcoran Hall
- Fulbright Hall
- H.B. Burns Memorial Building
- Madison Hall
- Stockton Hall
- Hattie M. Strong Residence Hall
