= M.T. Broyhill & Sons Corporation =

M.T. Boryhill and Sons Corp
- Type: Private
- Industry: Real-estate
- Founder: M.T. Broyhill
- Headquarters: United States
- Area served: United States
- Key people: M.T. Broyhill; Joel Broyhill; Marven Broyhill
- Products: Homes

M.T. Broyhill and Sons Corporation, also known as Broyhill and Sons, was a brick-and-mortar housing company based around Washington, D.C. Broyhill and Sons successfully capitalized on the post-World War II housing boom to become the largest builder of brick-and-mortar homes in the United States during the 1950s. By 1953, Broyhill and Sons was building 3,000 homes a year when the company also become the biggest customer of General Electric appliances. The company was owned by M.T. Broyhill, and sons Marvin Broyhill and Joel Broyhill whom become congressmen of Virginia for 11 terms, from 1953 to 1974. [

== History ==
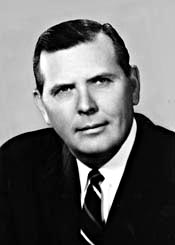
Joel Broyhill, one of three founders of the company

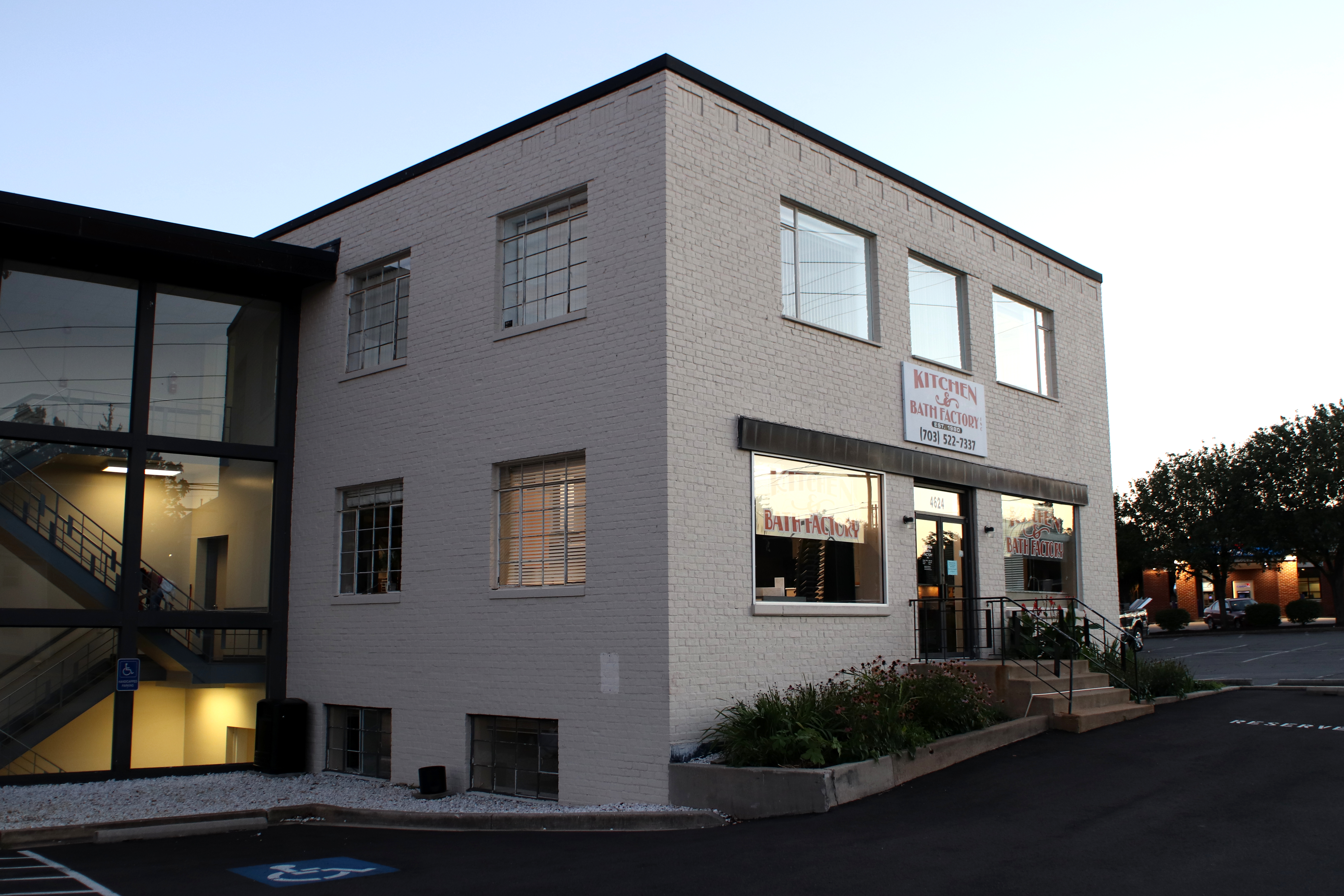
The former M.T. Broyhill and Sons corporate headquarters at 4624 Lee Highway, in Arlington County, Virginia

Founder Marvin Broyhill was born on July 27, 1888 in Moravian Falls, North Carolina. He founded the company in 1915, originally in Hopewell, Virginia. He married Nell Magdalene Broyhill (née Brewer) in 1917. The company built its first house in Northern Virginia, in 1934.

=== Sterling Park ===
Broyhill had long sought to develop a complete, self-contained satellite city. In the early 1960s, M.T. Broyhill and Sons entered into a partnership with U.S. Steel to develop 1,765 acres of farmland on either side of Route 7 into 3,500 houses, available in ten different models, 3,000 apartments, a 100 acre shopping center, a 75 acre recreation area, including an 18-hole golf course and a two acre lake, two elementary schools and a high school and a 547 acre industrial park, to be named Sterling Park Aerospace Center.

Part of the deal was that Sterling houses would be built with steel studs and siding, in order to promote of steel as a building material. The first phase of 1,000 houses were built with steel. After U.S. Steel withdrew from the deal, the remaining two phases of houses were built with lumber.

Many first-generation residents worked either at the newly opened Dulles International Airport or the Federal Aviation Administration's Regional Air Traffic Control Center in Leesburg, Virginia. For many, the attraction was the lack of a home owners' association – the community instead being managed by the nonprofit Sterling Foundation.

=== Founder retirement ===
In 1962, at the age of 73, after 47 years as the head of the company, M.T. Broyhill, Sr. retired and moved to Daytona Beach, Florida. His son, Marvin T. Broyhill, Jr. became the president, with cousin Tomas J. Broyhill as executive vice president and Representative Joel T. Broyhill one of the vice presidents.

== Houses ==
A typical house would feature an Interior Décor by Colony House and modern General Electric Kitchens in mix-or-match colors with dishwashers and metal cabinets. Prices increased during the life of the various subdivisions around Washington DC. Between 1979 and 2007, the Consumer Price Index increased by 2.8 times and the assessed value of a typical home increased by nearly 9 times, land by 15 times ($20,000 to $300,000 per quarter acre) and improvements by 5 to 10 times. All homes had air-conditioning. Air-conditioning was uncommon in homes of that price range at the time. Homeowners also have access to golf, tennis courts, and pools without membership fees. Broyhill's ideas, except for free golf, are realities today.

== Development ==
Notable projects include Sterling, Virginia where M.T. Broyhill and Sons built several thousand homes outside Dulles International Airport, and McLean, Virginia outside Washington D.C. The business strategy of Marvin Broyhill, Jr.'s was to put together a prefabricated home and sell it for about $17,000 less than a comparable Fairfax County Home.

- Broyhill-Glen Gary Park, McLean, Virginia
- Langley Estates, Maryland
- McLean Broyhill Estates, McLean, Virginia
- Sterling Park, Sterling, Virginia
- Broyhill's Addition, Arlington Forest, Arlington County, Virginia

=== 21st century ===
M.T. Broyhill and Sons Corporation's work is visible in Northern Virginia, where Broyhill family remain active in regional real estate, and several Broyhill companies, including LR Broyhill Co. and Broyhill Enterprises, Inc., have continued to develop in and around Washington D.C..
