= Lincoln Broyhill =

United States Army Air Forces soldier

Lincoln Felix Broyhill
- Born: January 31, 1925; Winston-Salem, North Carolina
- Died: November 21, 2008 (aged 83); Oakton, Virginia
- Military career
- Allegiance: United States of America
- Branch: United States Army Air Forces
- Service years: 1943-1945
- Nickname: Babe
- Units: 8th Air Force, 15th Air Force, 840th Bomb Squadron, 483rd Bombardment Group

Lincoln Felix "Babe" Broyhill (January 31, 1925 – November 21, 2008) was a record-setting American tail gunner in World War II and later a successful real estate developer.

== Early years ==
Broyhill was born in Winston-Salem, North Carolina, and grew up in Hopewell, Virginia, and later in Arlington, Virginia.

== Military service ==
Broyhill joined the U.S. Army Air Force in 1943. He served with the 8th Air Force in England, before being assigned to the 483rd Bombardment Group, based in Foggia, Italy.

In March 1945, Broyill was the tailgunner on a B-17 Flying Fortress known as the "Big Yank." The nose-art on the "Big Yank" included a portrait of President Franklin D. Roosevelt and was painted by Italian artist Mario Rucci. On March 24, 1945, Broyhill and the "Big Yank" flew in a 28-plane formation targeting the Daimler-Benz tank works near Berlin. The mission was the longest escorted bomber mission of World War II in Europe. The American bomber group was confronted by Luftwaffe Messerschmitt Me 262 jet fighters. In the air battle that followed, The 483rd Bombardment Group set several records, including the following:

- Most German jets destroyed by a single bomb group on one mission: six.
- Most German jets destroyed by one bomb group for the entire war: seven.
- Most German jets destroyed by a single crew on one mission: three.
- Most German jets destroyed by a single crew for the entire war: three.
- Most German jets destroyed by a single bomber for entire war: three.

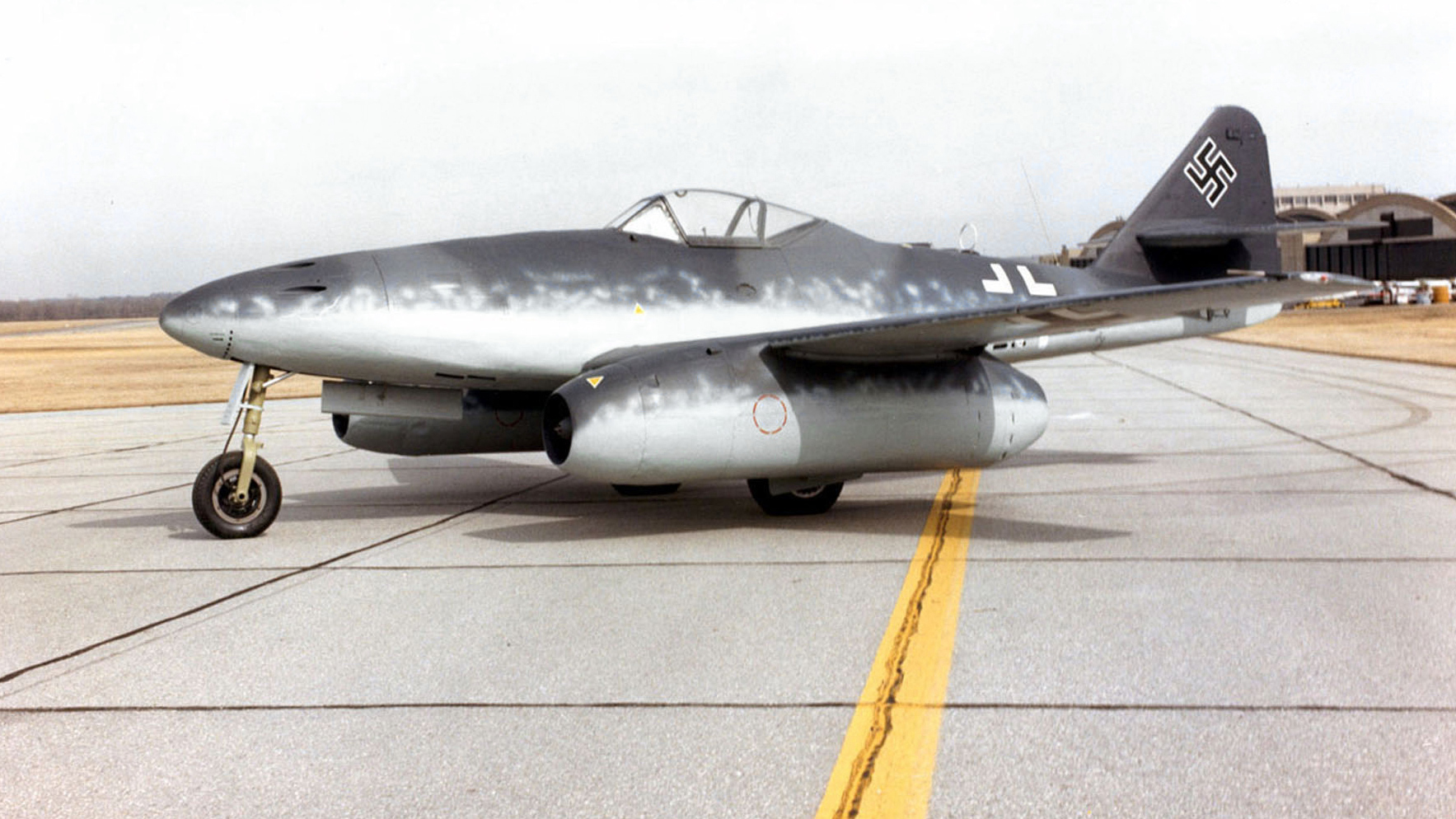
Messerschmitt Me 262 jet fighter.

The 483rd Bombardment Group received a Distinguished Unit Citation, and Broyhill set two individual records that day: (1) most German jets destroyed by a single gunner in one mission (two), and (2) most German jets destroyed by a single gunner during the entire war (two). Broyhill later recalled the record-setting mission as follows:

I saw four jets attacking a lone B-17 from another group. The B-17 knocked down one of the enemy fighters before it flew in a crippled manner towards the Russian lines. The remaining three fighters came at our plane. Two of them came right behind each other at my position. They were about 1000 yards away when I started cutting loose with my guns. The first (Me 262) made a pass at 200 yards and my tracers were going right into its fuselage. Suddenly it went down in flames. The second came into my sights after the first had dropped. I kept shooting away because he was getting into my hair. Suddenly, it also spiraled down. Upon hitting the ground, it burst into flames. Because I had my guns spitting lead so rapidly, they jammed.

== Career as a real estate developer ==
After being discharged from the Air Force, Broyhill returned to Arlington, Virginia, and graduated from Washington-Lee High School. He later joined the L.R. Broyhill Co., a real estate company that developed residential communities in Arlington and Fairfax Counties in northern Virginia. Broyhill formed his own company, Broyhill Enterprises, Inc., in 1969. He continued to work as a residential real estate developer until he retired in 1980 and was one of the early developers of the planned community of Reston, Virginia.

== Death ==
Broyhill died on November 21, 2008, of congestive heart failure at INOVA Fair Oaks Hospital in Oakton, Virginia. He was 83 years old, and was survived by his wife of 62 years, two children and a grandson.
