= Fulbright Hall =

- The Everglades
- U.S. National Register of Historic Places
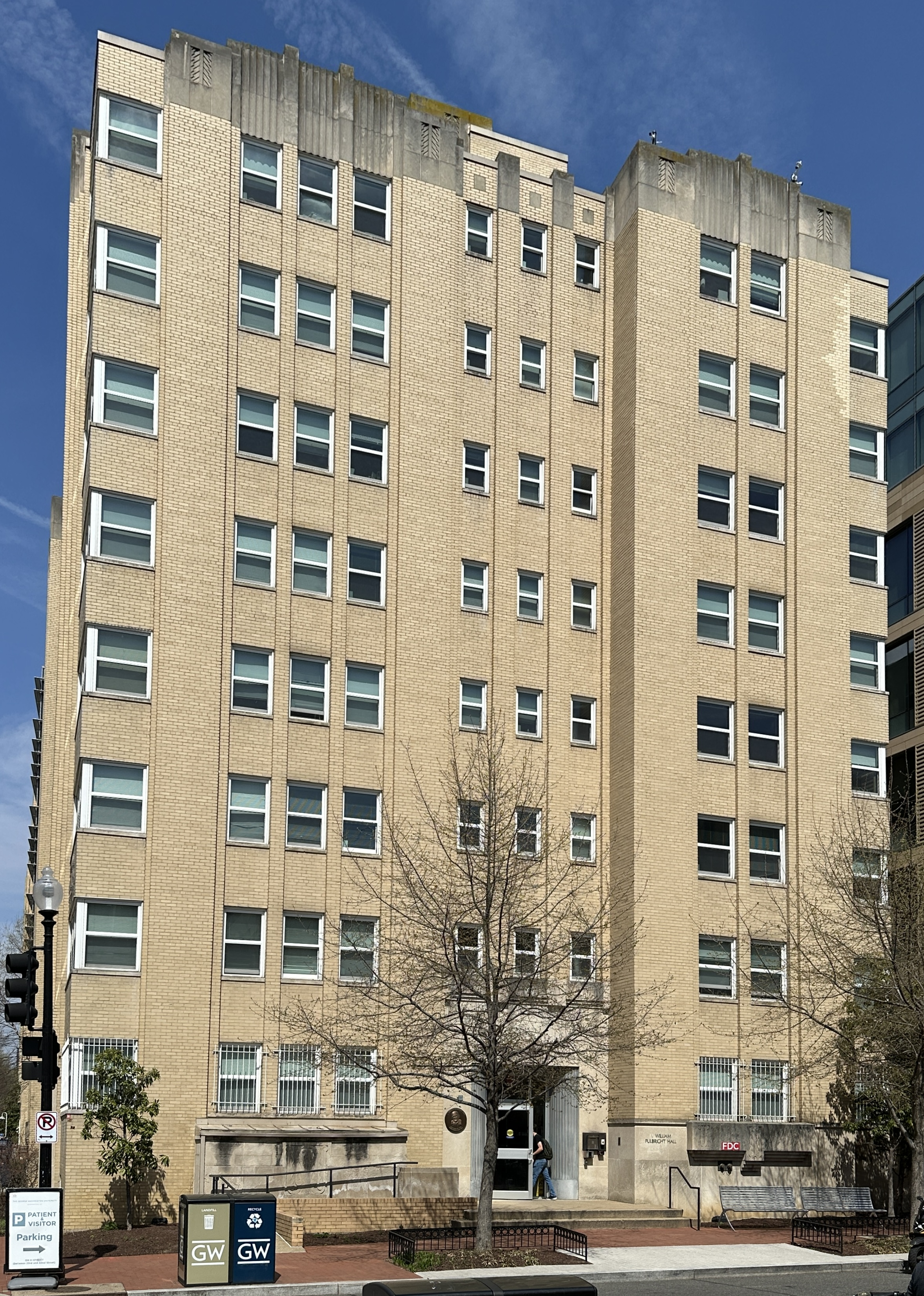
- Fulbright Hall in 2026

- Location within Washington, D.C.
- Location: 2223 H St., NW; Washington, D.C.
- Coordinates: 38°53′59″N 77°2′59″W
- Area: less than one acre
- Built: 1939
- Architect: Joseph Abel
- Architectural style: Art Deco
- MPS: Apartment Buildings in Washington, DC, MPS
- NRHP reference No.: 10000368
- Added to NRHP: June 18, 2010

Fulbright Hall, formerly known as The Everglades, is an undergraduate residence hall on the Foggy Bottom campus of the George Washington University (GW), named after J. William Fulbright, located at 2223 H St., Northwest, Washington, D.C., in the Foggy Bottom neighborhood.

== History ==
The building was designed by Joseph Abel in the Art Deco style and completed in 1939. The Art Deco detailing can be seen in the curved metal surrounding the main entrance and the cast stone at the roofline with zigzag motifs and vertical banding. It was acquired by the university originally for use as a residence for nurses and was renamed in honor of Senator J. William Fulbright on May 6, 1996. He had earned a LL.B. degree from GW in 1934. It was listed on the District of Columbia Inventory of Historic Sites and the National Register of Historic Places in 2010.

== See also ==
- H.B. Burns Memorial Building
- Corcoran Hall
- Madison Hall
- Munson Hall
- Jacqueline Bouvier Kennedy Onassis Hall
- Stockton Hall
- Hattie M. Strong Residence Hall
