= Al's Motors =

Historic commercial building in Virginia, United States

- U.S. National Register of Historic Places
- Virginia Landmarks Register
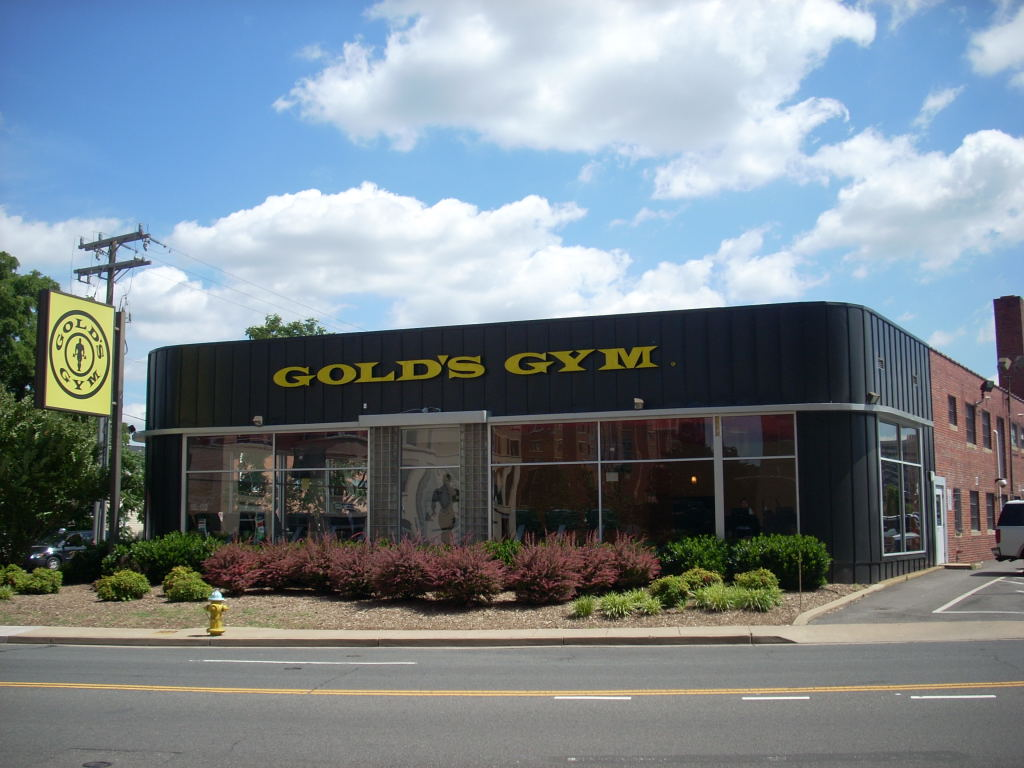
- Gold's Gym in June 2009

- Location within District of Columbia Location within Virginia Location within the United States
- Location: 3910 Wilson Blvd., Arlington County, Virginia, U.S.
- Coordinates: 38°52′45″N 77°6′27″W
- Area: less than one acre
- Built: 1948
- Architect: Mims, J. Raymond
- Architectural style: Streamline Moderne
- NRHP reference No.: 03000628
- VLR No.: 000-7381

Significant dates
- Added to NRHP: July 5, 2003
- Designated VLR: December 4, 2002

Al's Motors is a historic automobile dealership building located in the Ballston neighborhood of Arlington County, Virginia. It was built in 1948, and is a two-story masonry building in a high-style Streamline Moderne style. There is a one-story service garage with a barrel-vaulted roof. The building features rounded corners, a metal-and-glass curtain wall opening onto the automobile showroom, overhanging aluminum cornice, and red string courses mimicking racing stripes along the parapet. The property was renovated in 2001-2002 for use as a health club.

It was listed on the National Register of Historic Places in 2003.

== Gallery ==
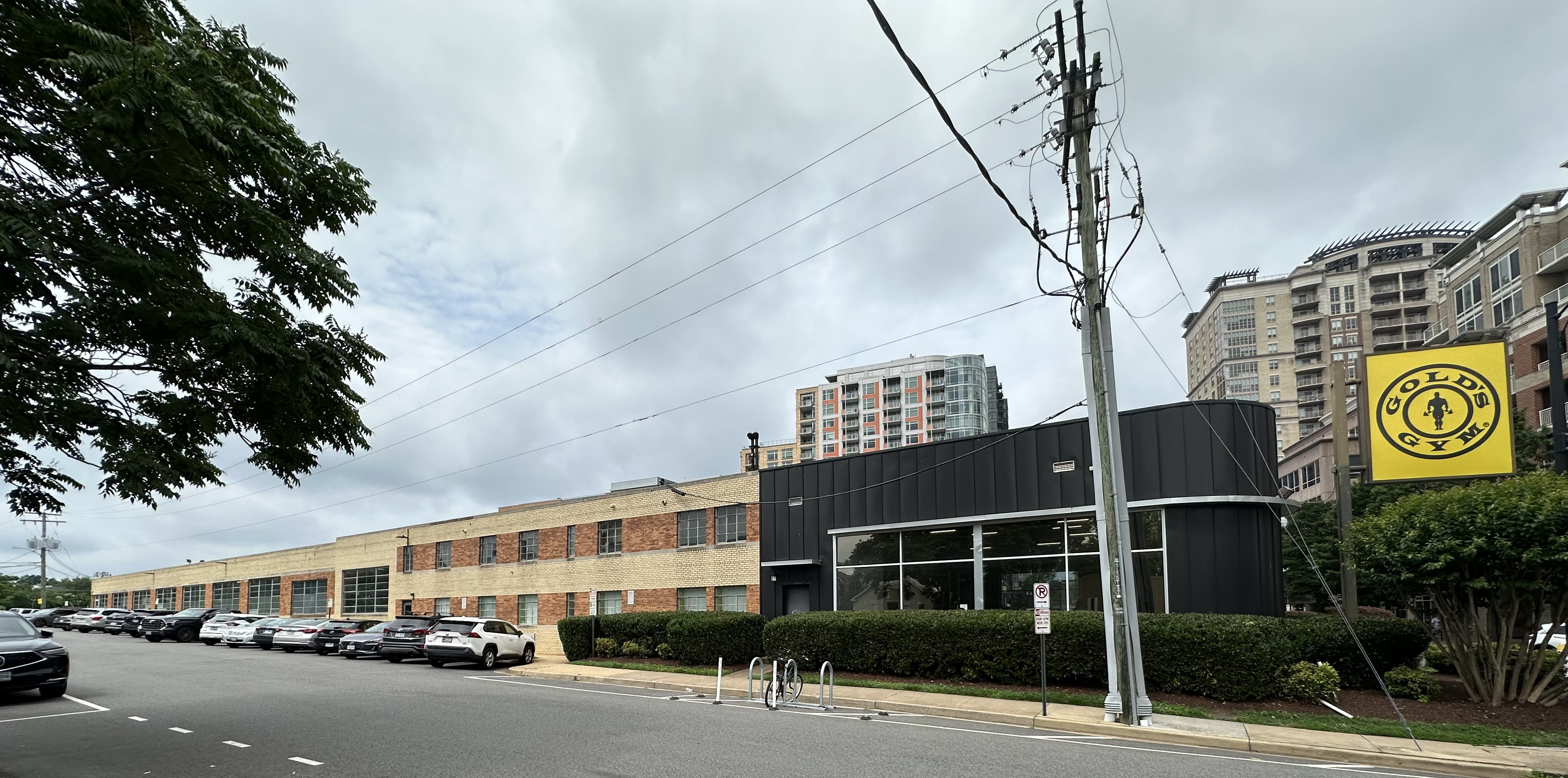
Viewed from northeast

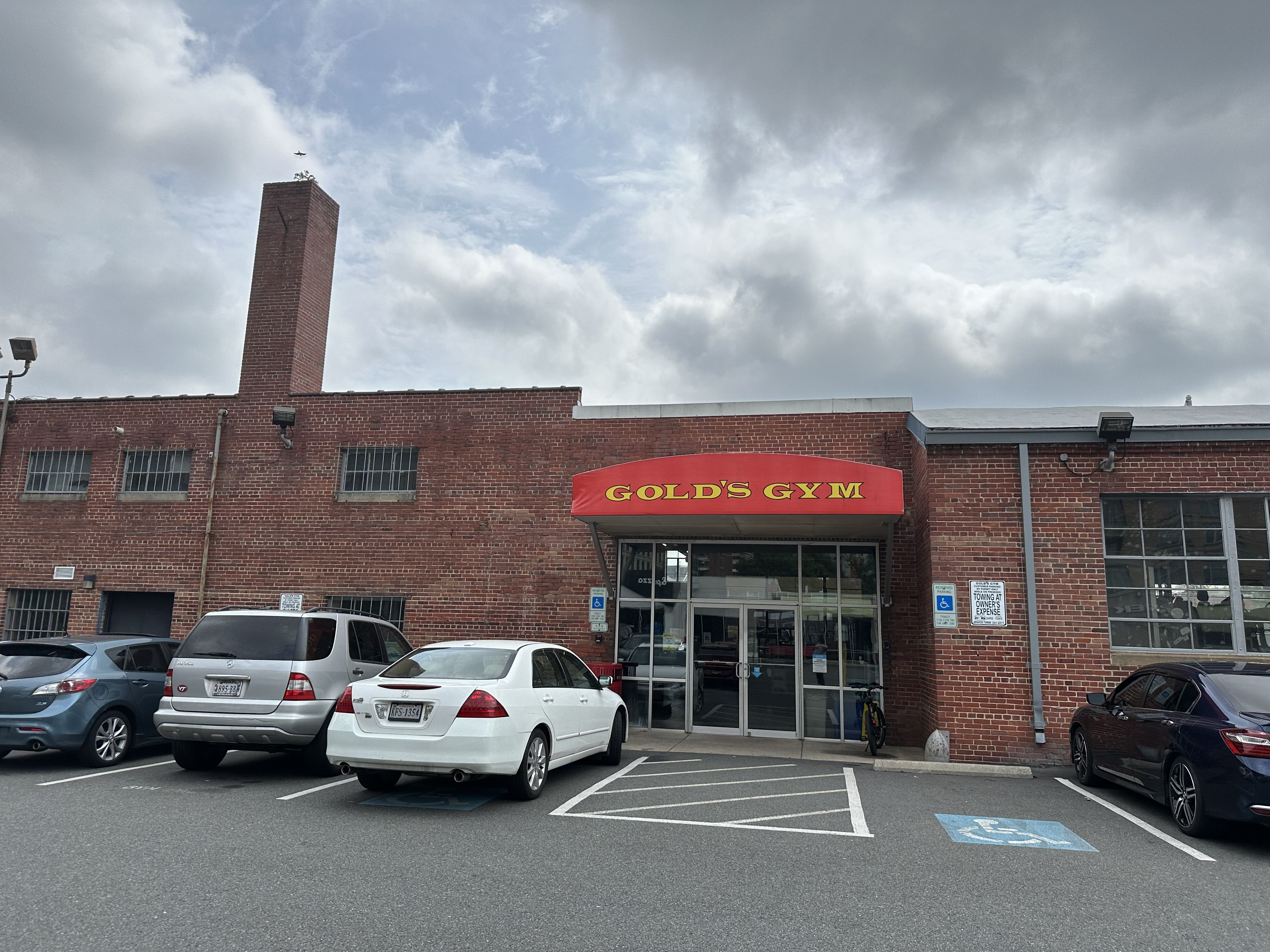
Entrance
