= Madison Hall =

- The Flagler
- U.S. National Register of Historic Places
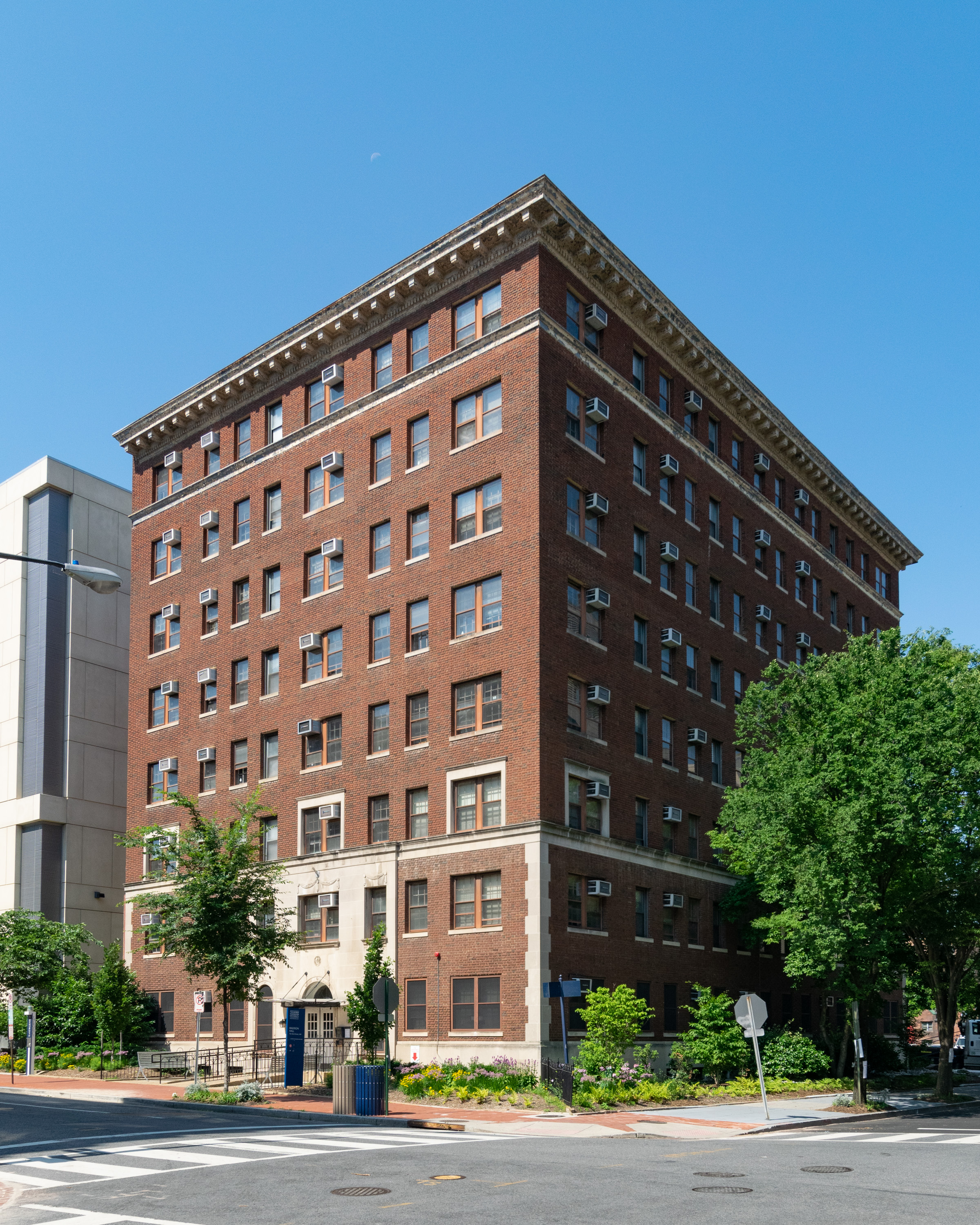

- Location within Washington, D.C.
- Location: 736 22nd St., NW; Washington, D.C.
- Coordinates: 38°53′58″N 77°2′56″W
- Area: less than one acre
- Built: 1926
- Architect: Stern and Tomlinson
- MPS: Apartment Buildings in Washington, DC, MPS
- NRHP reference No.: 10000369
- Added to NRHP: June 18, 2010

Madison Hall, formerly known as the Flagler Apartments, is a residence hall on the campus of George Washington University (GW) in Washington, D.C. The building was designed by Stern and Tomlinson and was built in 1926. The building is representative of the apartment buildings that were built from the 1920s to the 1940s that have been acquired by the university and converted into dormitories. GW bought the building in 1957 and replaced its manually operated elevators during its renovations. The building was named for both James Madison and Dolley Madison. It was listed on the District of Columbia Inventory of Historic Sites and the National Register of Historic Places in 2010.

== See also ==
- H.B. Burns Memorial Building
- Corcoran Hall
- Fulbright Hall
- Jacqueline Bouvier Kennedy Onassis Hall
- Munson Hall
- Stockton Hall
- Hattie M. Strong Residence Hall
