= Hattie M. Strong Residence Hall =

- U.S. National Register of Historic Places
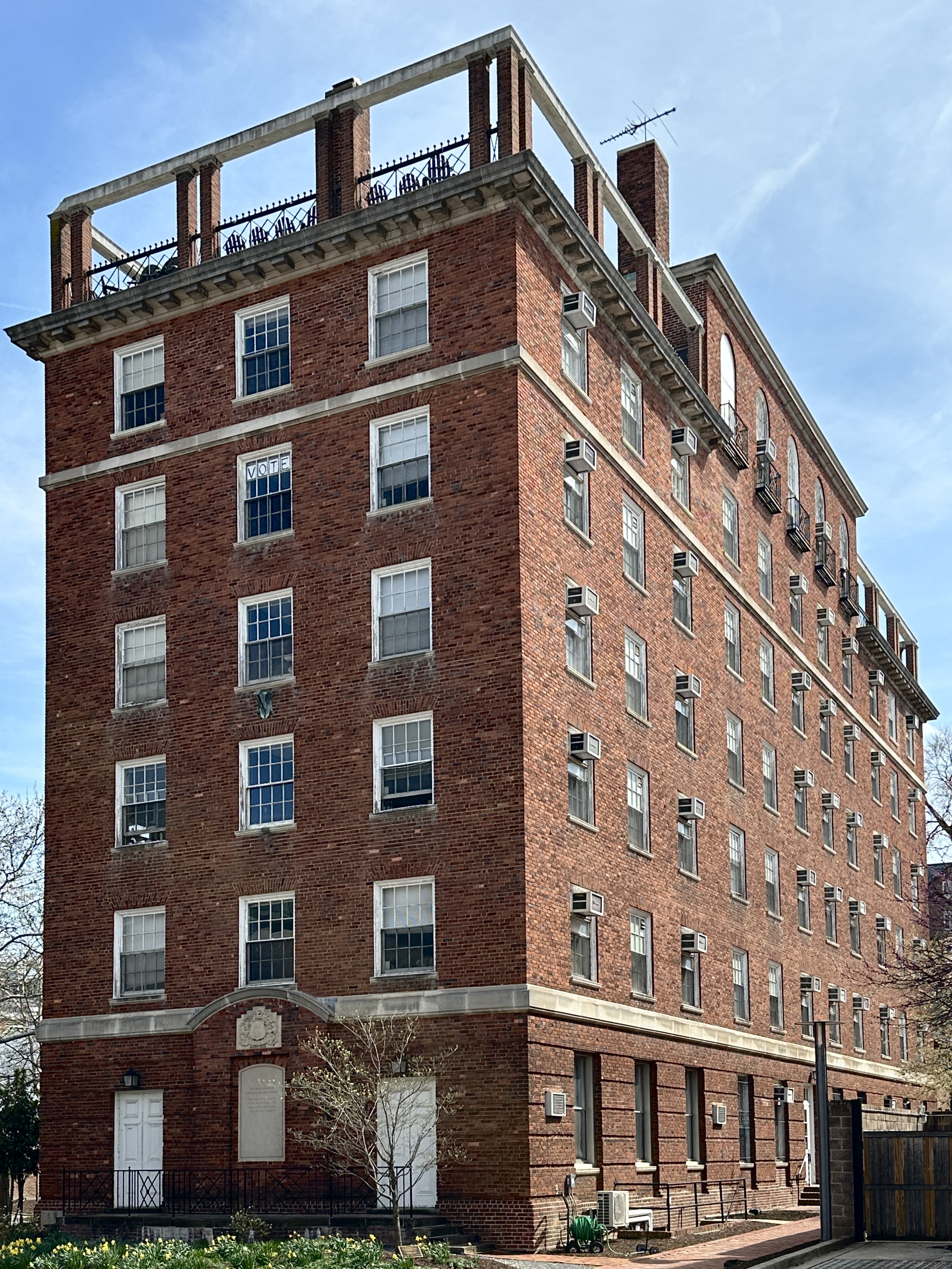
- Hattie M. Strong Residence Hall in 2026

- Location within Washington, D.C. Location within the United States
- Location: 620 21st St., NW; Washington, D.C.
- Coordinates: 38°53′52″N 77°2′50″W
- Area: less than one acre
- Built: 1934
- Architect: Alexander Buel Trowbridge; Waldron Faulkner
- Architectural style: Colonial Revival
- NRHP reference No.: 90001547
- Added to NRHP: April 12, 1991

Hattie M. Strong Residence Hall is a women's dormitory on the campus of George Washington University in Washington, D.C. It was listed on the District of Columbia Inventory of Historic Sites in 1987 and on the National Register of Historic Places in 1991.

== History ==
The building was designed by A.B. Trowbridge and Waldron Faulkner in the Colonial Revival style and completed in 1934. The Charles H. Tompkins Company built the structure, which was dedicated on May 7, 1937. The building is named for Hattie Maria Corrin Strong, the second wife of Henry A. Strong who was a co-founder and the first president of the Eastman Kodak Company. She served as a University Trustee and donated $200,000 for a women's dormitory in 1934. An inscription on the north wall of the building reads: "Erected by a woman's altruism and understanding. Dedicated to the growth of the human spirit that God and the State may be served by noble women."

== Architecture ==
Strong Hall is a seven-story building and measures 128 feet (39 m) wide and 38 feet (12 m) deep. The exterior is faced with red brick and is massed into three vertical sections. The middle section is one-story taller than the two side sections. Stylized pergola composed of brick sits on top of the side sections. Between the first and second floors and the fifth and sixth floors is a belt course of concrete.

== See also ==
- H.B. Burns Memorial Building
- Fulbright Hall
- Madison Hall
- Munson Hall
- Jacqueline Bouvier Kennedy Onassis Hall
- Stockton Hall
