= Logan Circle (Washington, D.C.) =

- Neighborhood of Washington, D.C.
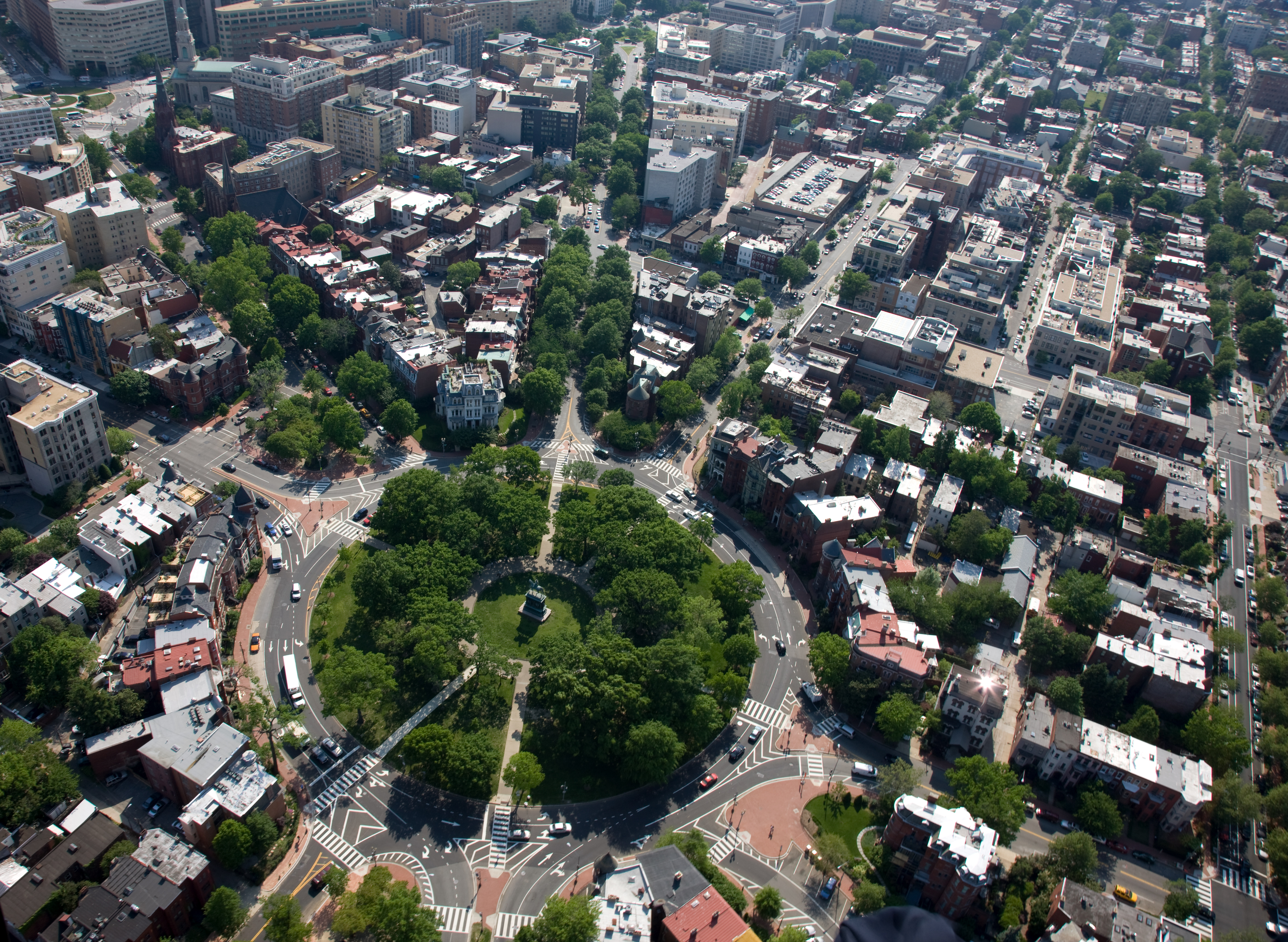
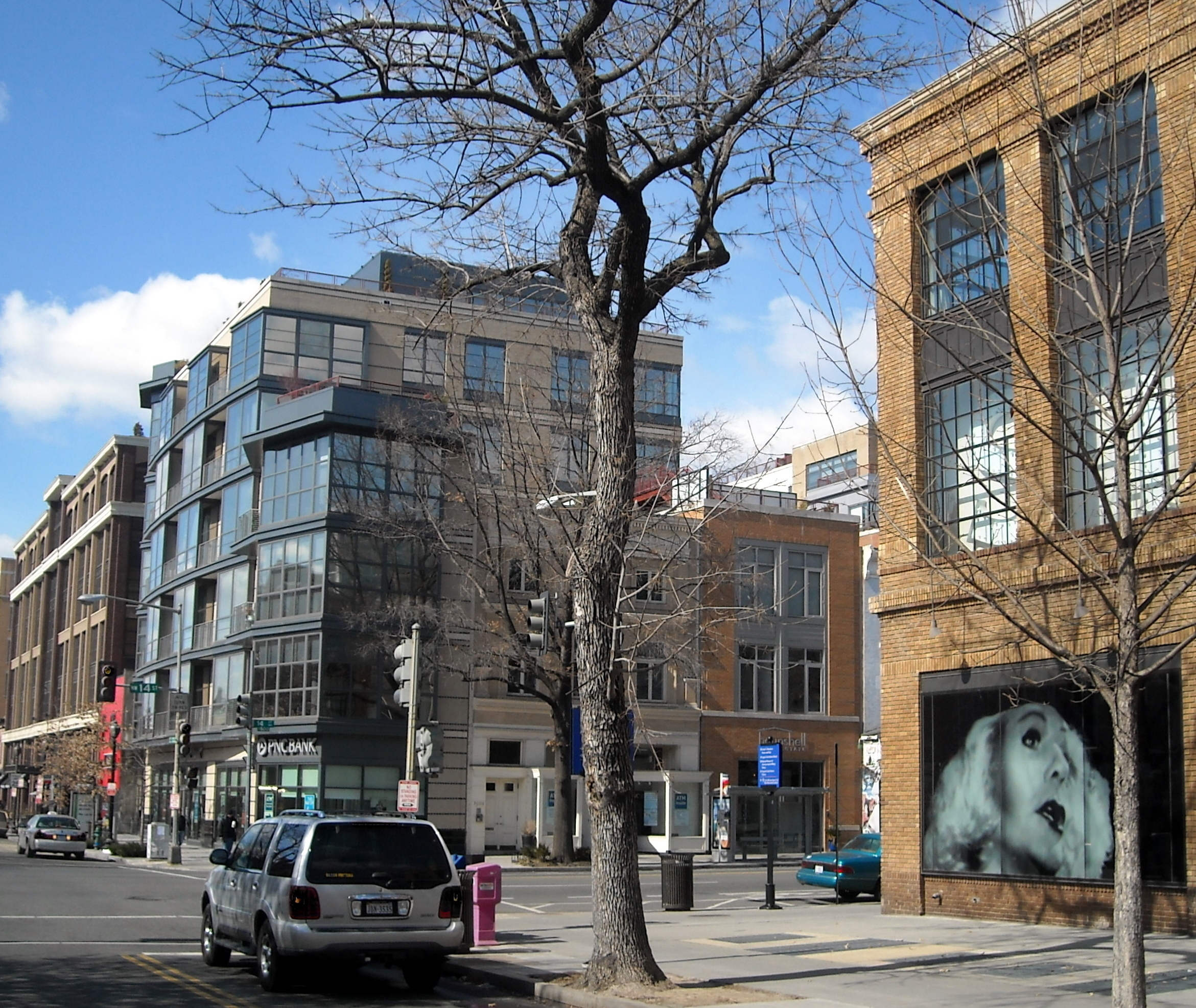
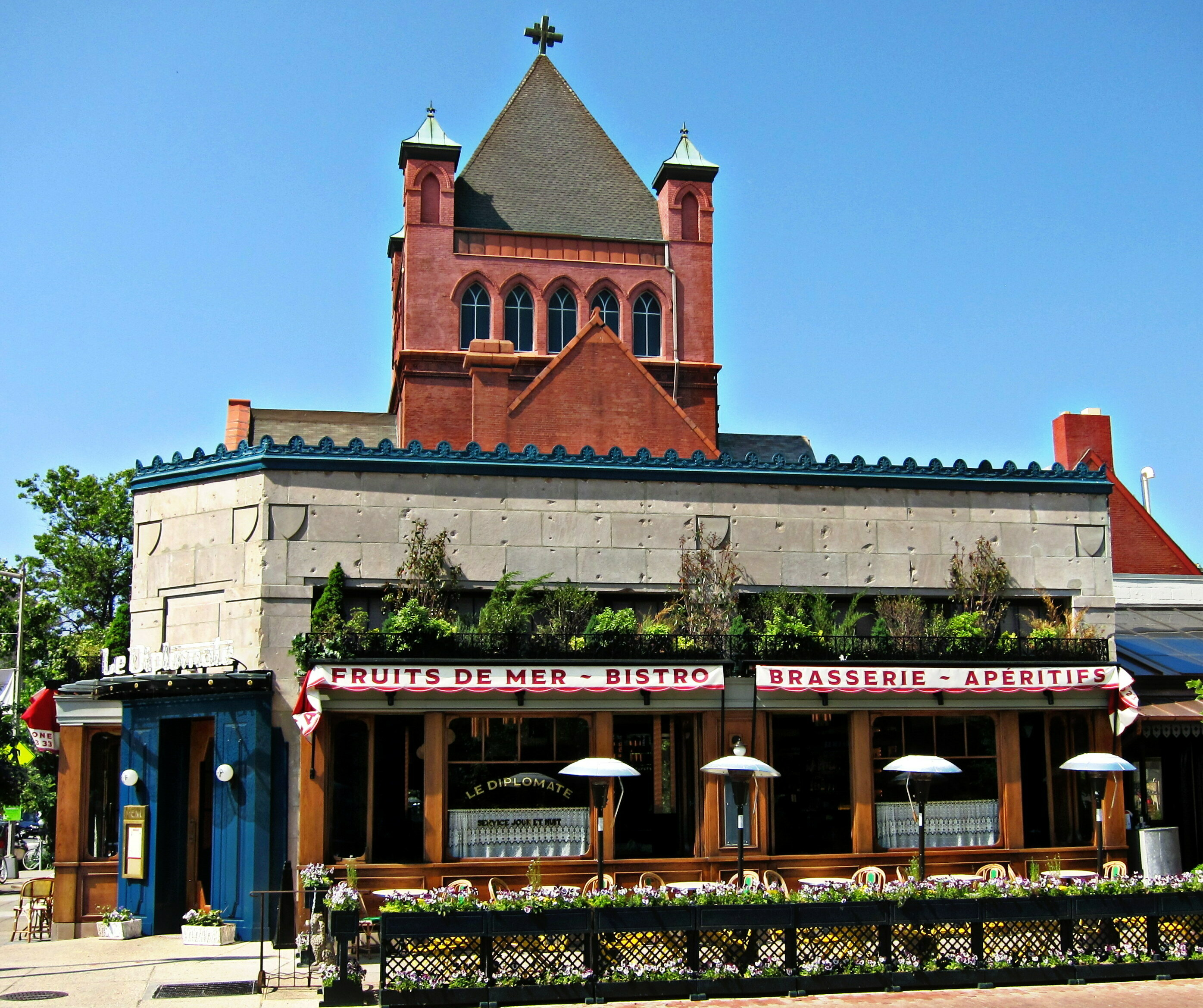
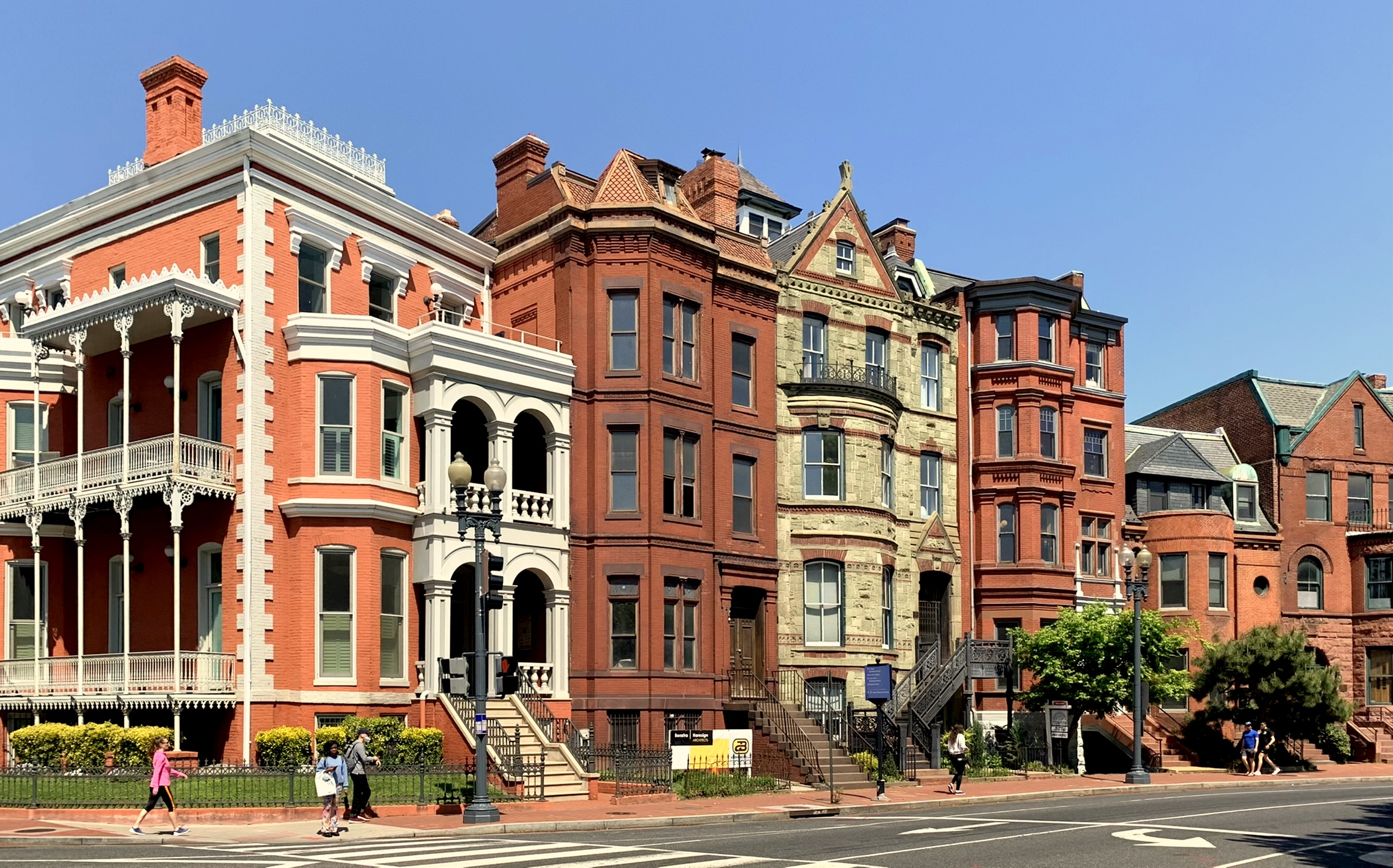
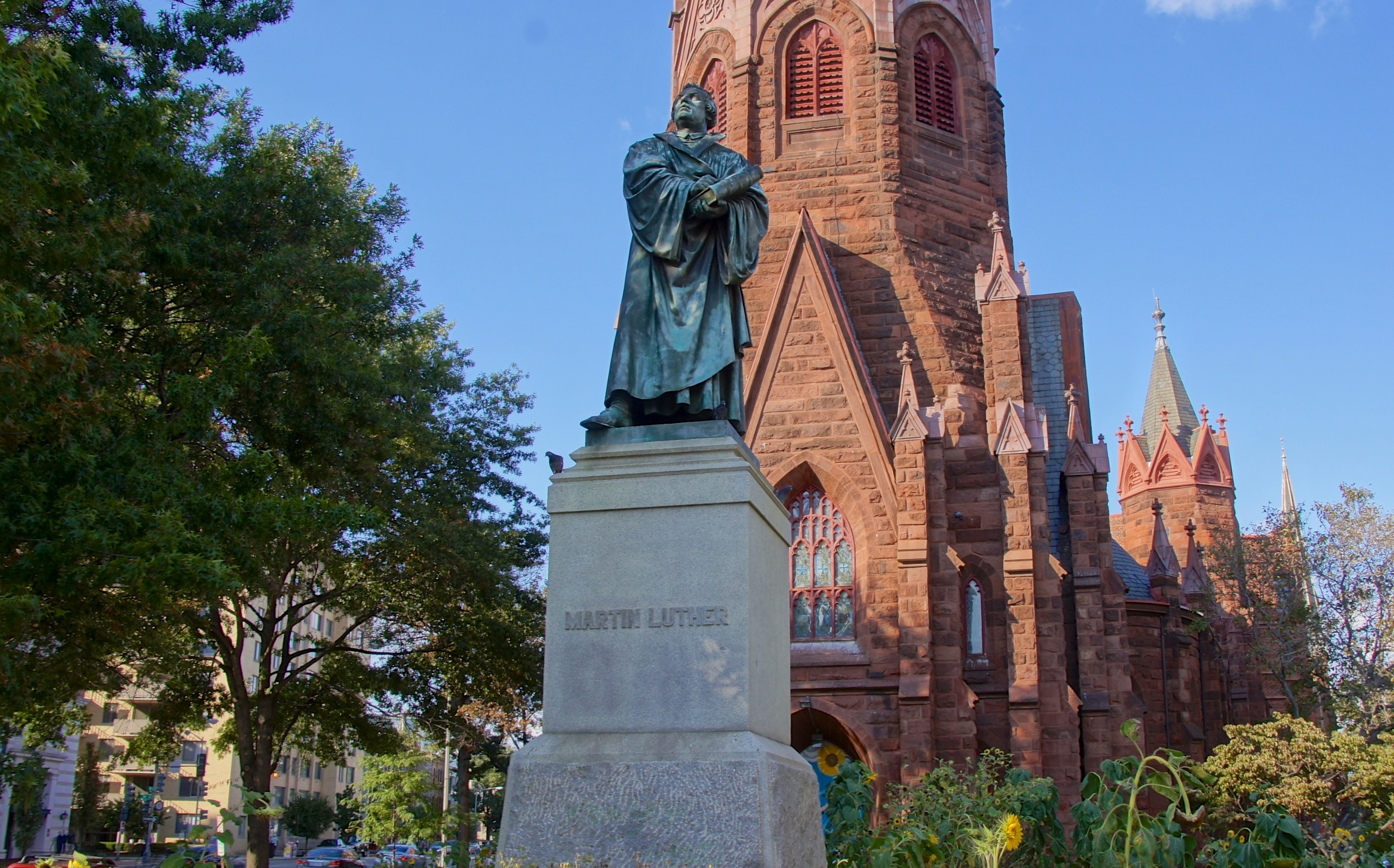
- Clockwise from the top: aerial view of Logan Circle; Le Diplomate; Luther Place Church; historic homes on Logan Circle; 14th Street.

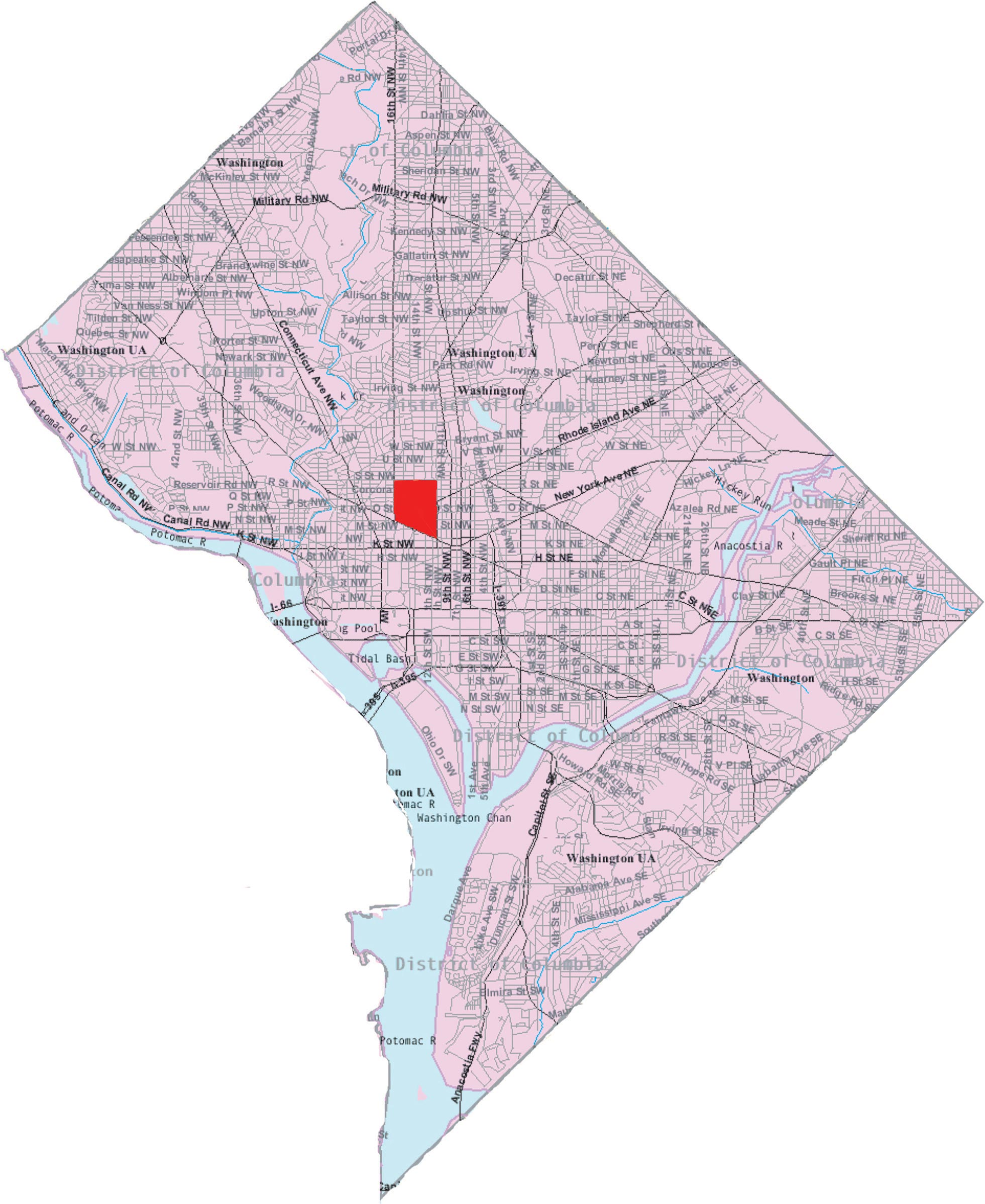
- Coordinates: 38.909644°N 77.029647°W
- Country: United States
- District: Washington, D.C.
- Quadrant: Northwest
- Ward: 2

Government
  - Councilmember: Brooke Pinto

Area
  - Total: .22 sq mi (0.57 km^{2})
- combined area of census tracts 50.03, 50.04, 52.02, and 52.03

Population (2020)
  - Total: 14,403
  - Density: 64,878/sq mi (25,050/km^{2})
- combined populations of census tracts 50.03, 50.04, 52.02, and 52.03
- Postal code: ZIP code

Logan Circle is a historic roundabout park and neighborhood of Washington, D.C., located in Northwest D.C. The majority of Logan Circle is primarily residential, except for the highly-commercialized 14th Street corridor that passes through the western part of the neighborhood. In the 21st century, Logan Circle has been the focus of urban redevelopment and become one of Washington's most expensive neighborhoods. Logan Circle is also one of the city's most prominent gay neighborhoods.

Logan Circle includes two historic districts, as well as numerous sites listed on the National Register of Historic Places or as D.C. Historic Landmarks. The circle's origins date to the 1870s, when the area was developed as a residential neighborhood to serve Washington's growing bourgeoisie. In 1901, President William McKinley inaugurated the General Logan equestrian statue at the center of the circle's park. In 1930, the U.S. Congress officially named the circle in honor of Union General John A. Logan.

== History ==
=== 19th century ===
Historically, Logan Circle occupies a site that was part of Pierre L’Enfant’s 1791 plan for Washington. However, the space was originally envisioned as a large triangular plaza—significantly bigger and differently shaped than the circular form we see today.

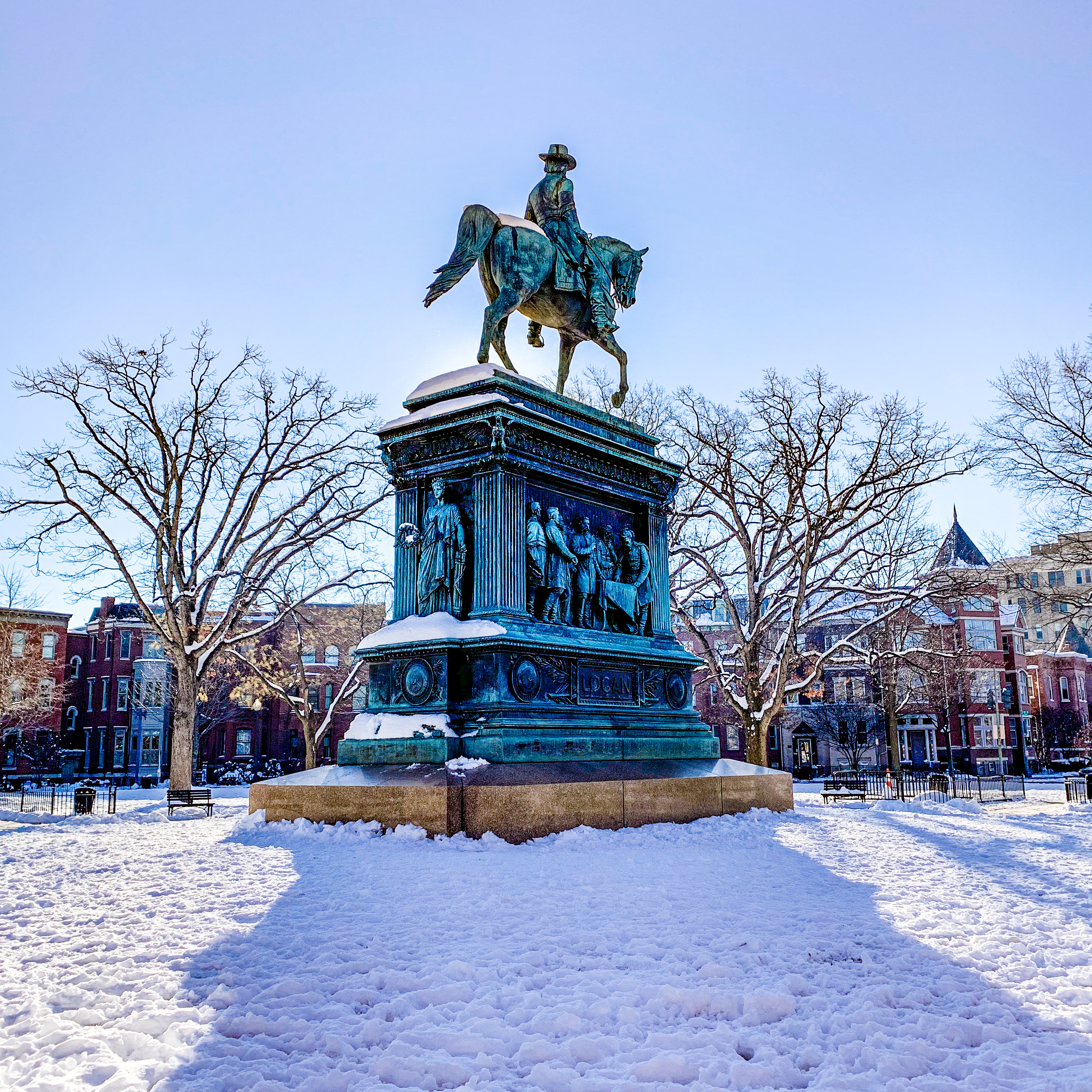
The General Logan equestrian statue commemorates Civil War general John A. Logan. Designed by Franklin Simmons, it was dedicated in 1901 by President William McKinley.

During the Civil War, present-day Logan Circle was home to Camp Barker, former barracks converted into a refugee camp for newly freed enslaved people from nearby Virginia and Maryland. In the 1870s, streets, elm trees, and other amenities were installed by Washington Mayor Alexander Robey Shepherd, who encouraged the development of the area. Streetcar tracks were laid into what was then a very swampy area north of downtown Washington, to encourage development of the original Washington City Plan. As a result, the area saw development of successive blocks of Victorian row houses marketed to the upper middle class, which sought to give Washington the reputation, modeled after European capitals, of a city of broad boulevards and well-manicured parks. Many of the larger and more ornate homes came with carriage houses and attached servant's quarters, which were later converted to apartments and rooming houses as the upper middle class moved elsewhere.

=== 20th century ===
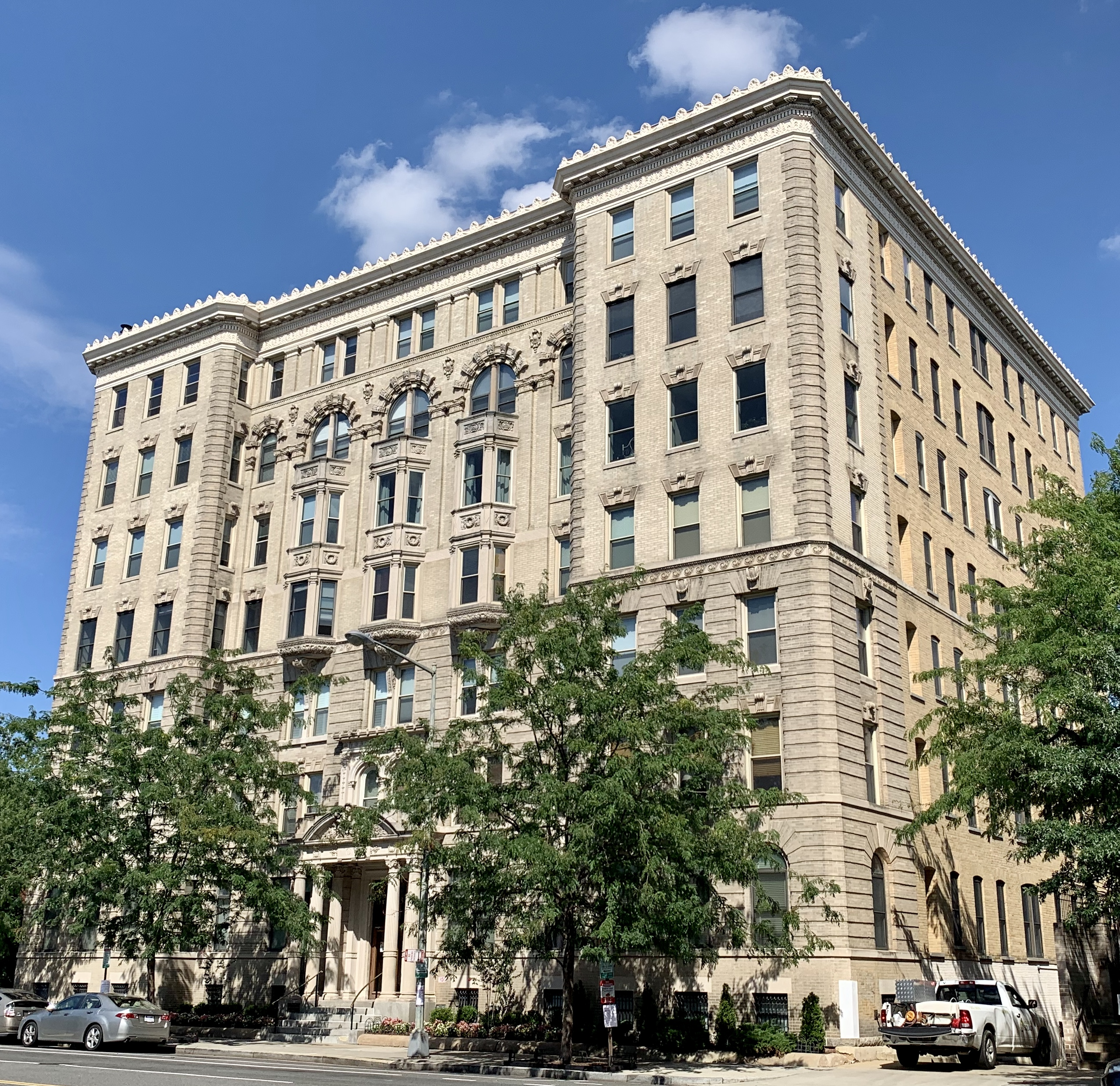
The Iowa, built in 1901, named after Iowa Circle, which was officially renamed by the U.S. Congress in honor of General Logan in 1930.

Originally known as Iowa Circle, the park was renamed by Congress in 1930 in honor of John A. Logan, Commander of the Army of the Tennessee during the Civil War, Commander of the Grand Army of the Republic, and U.S. representative and senator for the state of Illinois, who lived at 4 Logan Circle. At the center of the circle stands Major General John A. Logan, an equestrian statue of Logan sculpted by Franklin Simmons and a bronze statue base designed by architect Richard Morris Hunt. On April 9, 1901, the 25-foot monument was dedicated by President William McKinley, Senator Chauncey Depew, and General Grenville M. Dodge.

In the early 20th century, 14th Street NW rose to prominence as a main shopping district for both black and white Washingtonians on the edge of downtown Washington D.C., and became known as an area for auto showrooms. Farther north, "14th and U" became synonymous with a large African-American community, later known as Shaw, which encompassed parts of Logan Circle and U Street to the north. Segregation marked the emergence of this large area of well-preserved Victorian row houses as a predominantly African-American community; the unofficial dividing line was 16th Street NW, several blocks to the west, with Logan Circle and its older homes sandwiched in between.

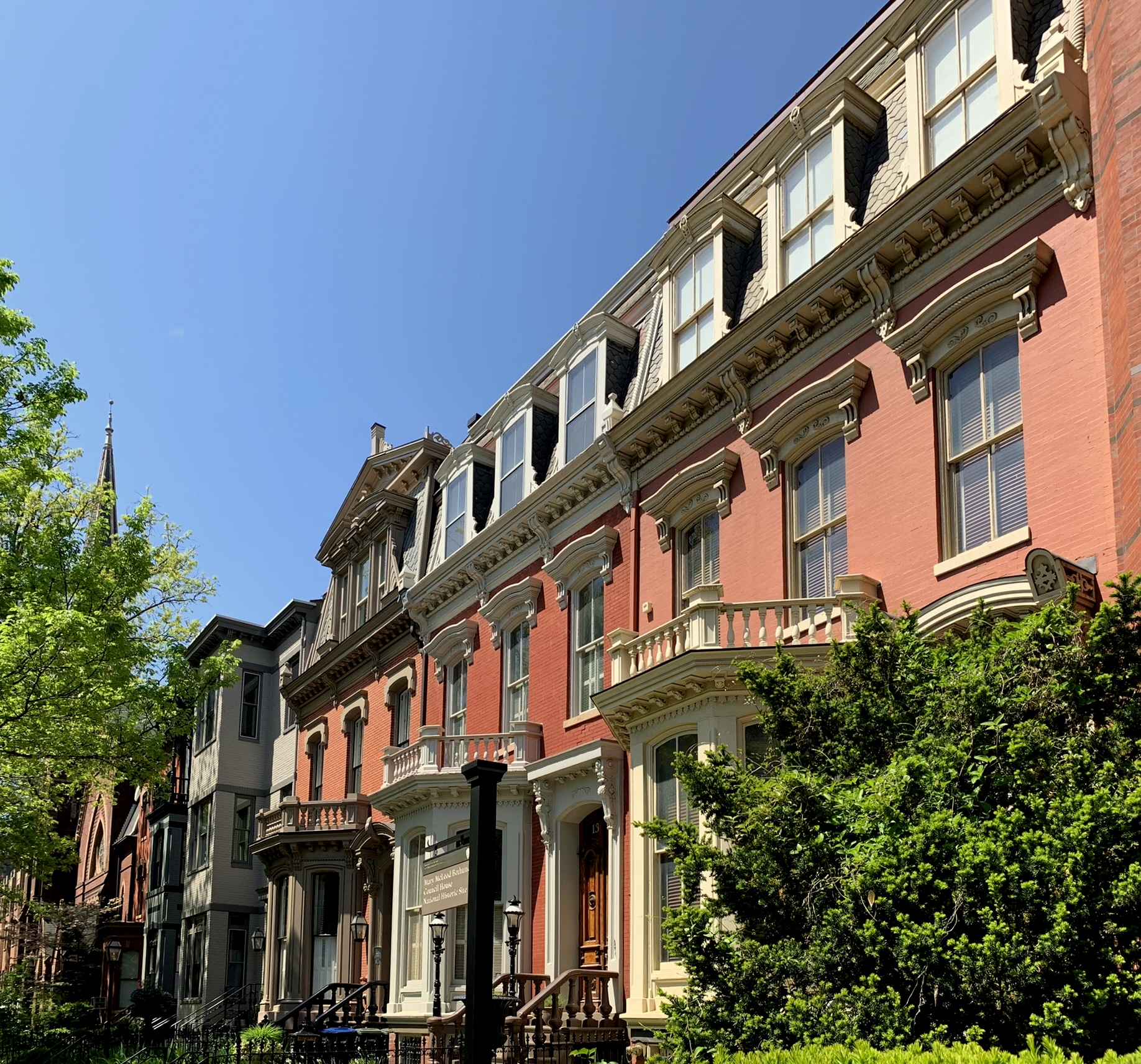
A row of Victorian townhomes on Vermont Avenue beside the Mary McLeod Bethune House.

During this period, the original Victorian homes in the area were subdivided into apartments, hostels, and rooming houses. With the end of legal segregation, middle-class residents of both races left the area. Many left after the destructive 1968 Washington, D.C. riots following the assassination of Martin Luther King Jr. These devastated the 14th and U streets commercial corridors.

In 1956, the three inner lanes of 13th Street were paved across Logan Circle to speed the influx of suburban workers into DC. In 1980, to encourage more people to use Metro, the inner lanes across Logan Circle were closed. Later they were removed and the park restored.

During the 1980s and 1990s, Logan Circle, although dominated by Victorian homes that had survived mostly untouched by redevelopment or riots, was considered an unsafe neighborhood by many due to overt drug use and prostitution that existed in the neighborhood. During this period, property values in the area began to increase, but issues of homelessness in the area came to the forefront. Fourteenth Street, NW became widely viewed as Washington's red light district. It also became an area for small, independent theater companies that acquired relatively cheap space north of the circle.

=== 21st century ===
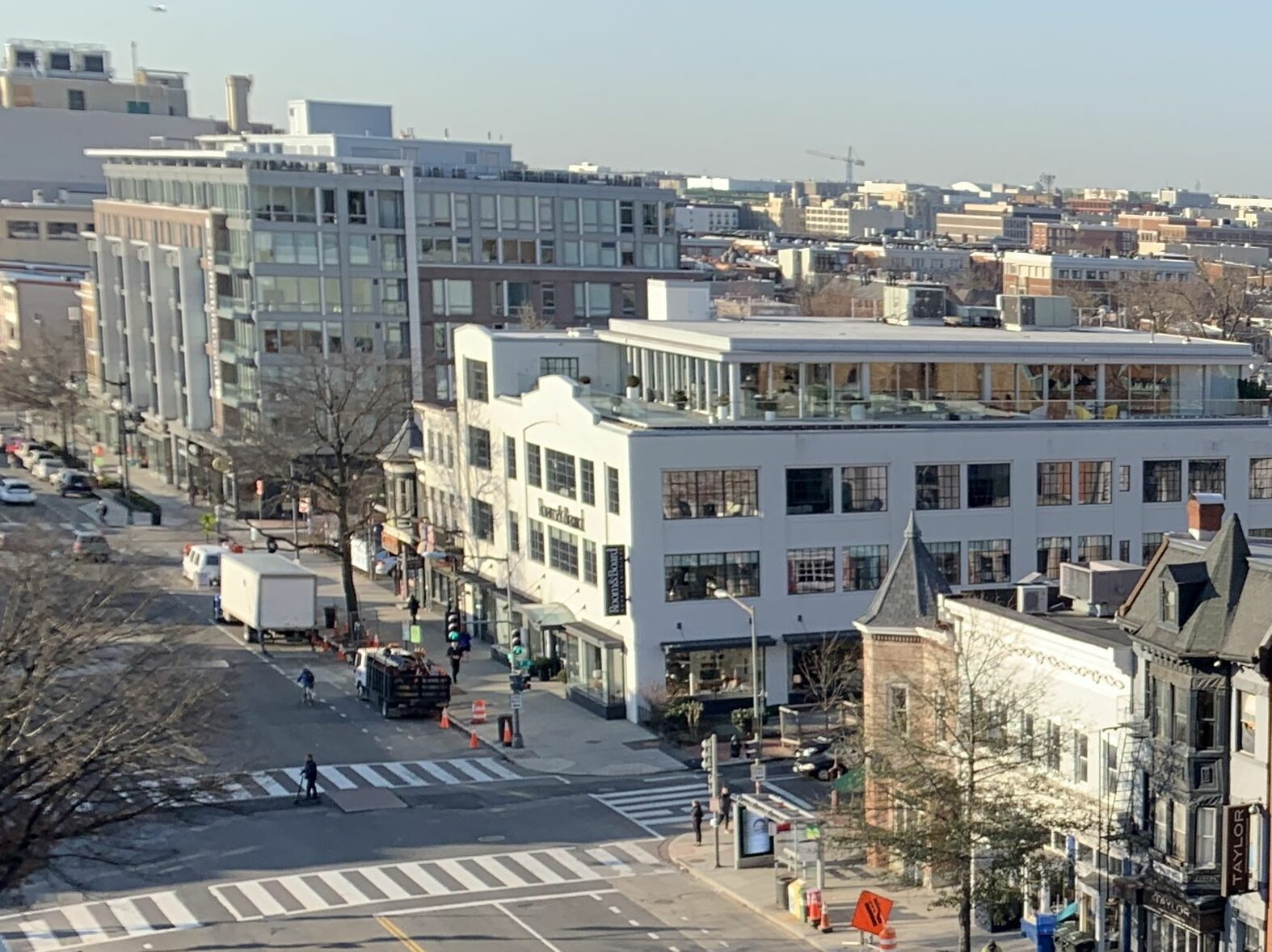
Retail along 14th Street.

During the 2000s, the area gentrified and housing costs sharply increased after derelict buildings were torn down or remodeled. The commercial corridors along 14th and P streets attracted significant revitalization. They now feature a variety of retailers, restaurants, art galleries, live theater, and nightlife venue gay bars catering to the neighborhood's booming LGBT population.

A watershed event in the development of the neighborhood was the opening of a Whole Foods Market two blocks from Logan Circle in December 2000. No full grocery store was in the area. It was developed on a site previously occupied by an abandoned service garage; it is now one of the chain's highest-grossing markets. Gentrification in Logan Circle has resulted in a dramatic change of neighborhood demographics; since the 1990s, thousands of White young LGBT and hipster adults have moved into the neighborhood, while thousands of Black families have moved out because of rising prices.

On November 12, 2026, a man opened fire in the neighborhood, killing his landlord and wounding six random people. He then committed suicide in his apartment during a stand-off with police; during this stand-off, he fired two rounds towards officers, but did not hit any of them.

== Landmarks ==
- Logan Circle Historic District
- U.S. National Register of Historic Places
- U.S. Historic district
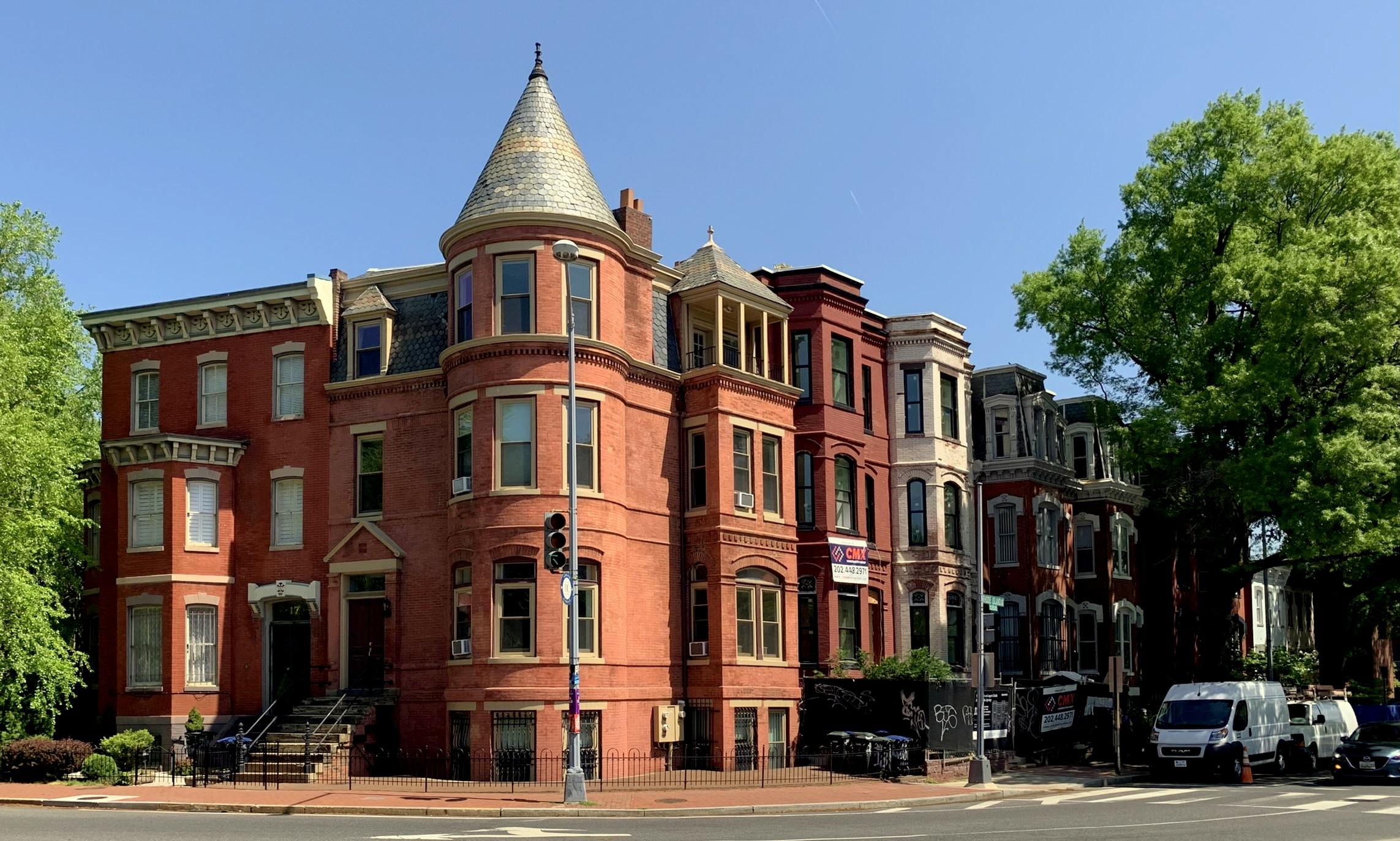
- Row houses on the northeast corner of Logan Circle, including the former residence (corner building) of writer Ambrose Bierce
- Location: Junction of 13th Street, P Street, Rhode Island Avenue, and Vermont Avenue, NW
- Coordinates: 38°54′35″N 77°1′49″W
- Area: 18 acres (7.3 ha)
- Architectural style: Second Empire, Italianate, Richardsonian Romanesque, Queen Anne
- NRHP reference No.: 72001426
- Added to NRHP: June 30, 1972

=== Logan Circle Historic District ===
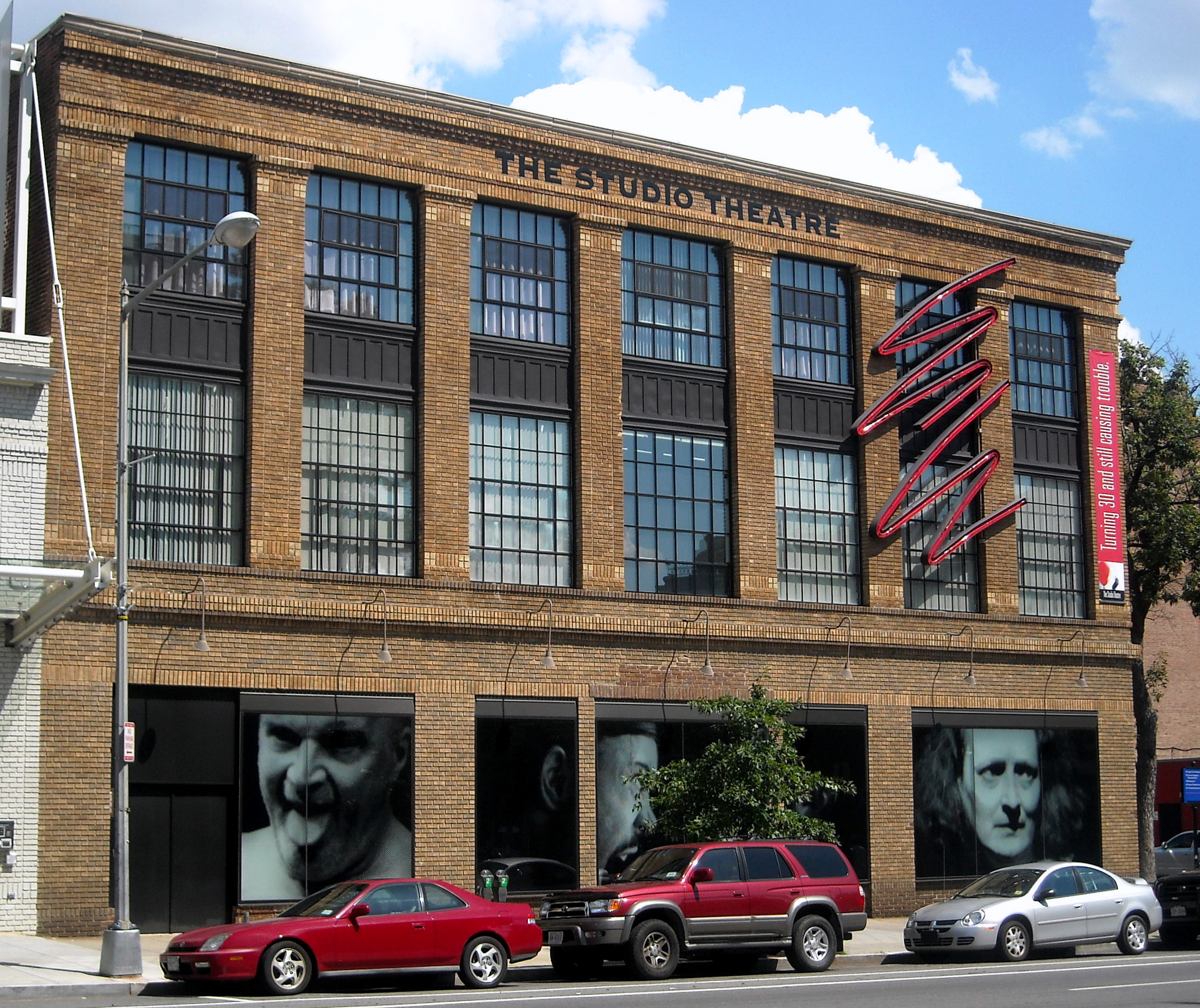
The historic Studio Theatre.

The Logan Circle Historic District is an eight-block area surrounding the circle, containing 135 late-19th-century residences designed predominantly in the Late Victorian and Richardsonian Romanesque styles of architecture. The district was added to the National Register of Historic Places on June 30, 1972.

The former home of Mary McLeod Bethune, an African American educator, author, and civil rights leader who founded the National Council of Negro Women, is located at 1318 Vermont Avenue NW, one block south of the circle. The Second Empire-style building is a designated National Historic Site and houses the Mary McLeod Bethune Memorial Museum and the National Archives for Black Women's History.

=== Fourteenth Street Historic District ===
In addition to the Logan Circle Historic District, the neighborhood includes the much larger Fourteenth Street Historic District, added to the NRHP in 1994. The district's approximately 765 contributing properties are considered historically significant because they represent residential and commercial development resulting from one of the earliest streetcar lines in Washington, D.C., the Capital Traction Company's 14th Street line, built in the 1880s.

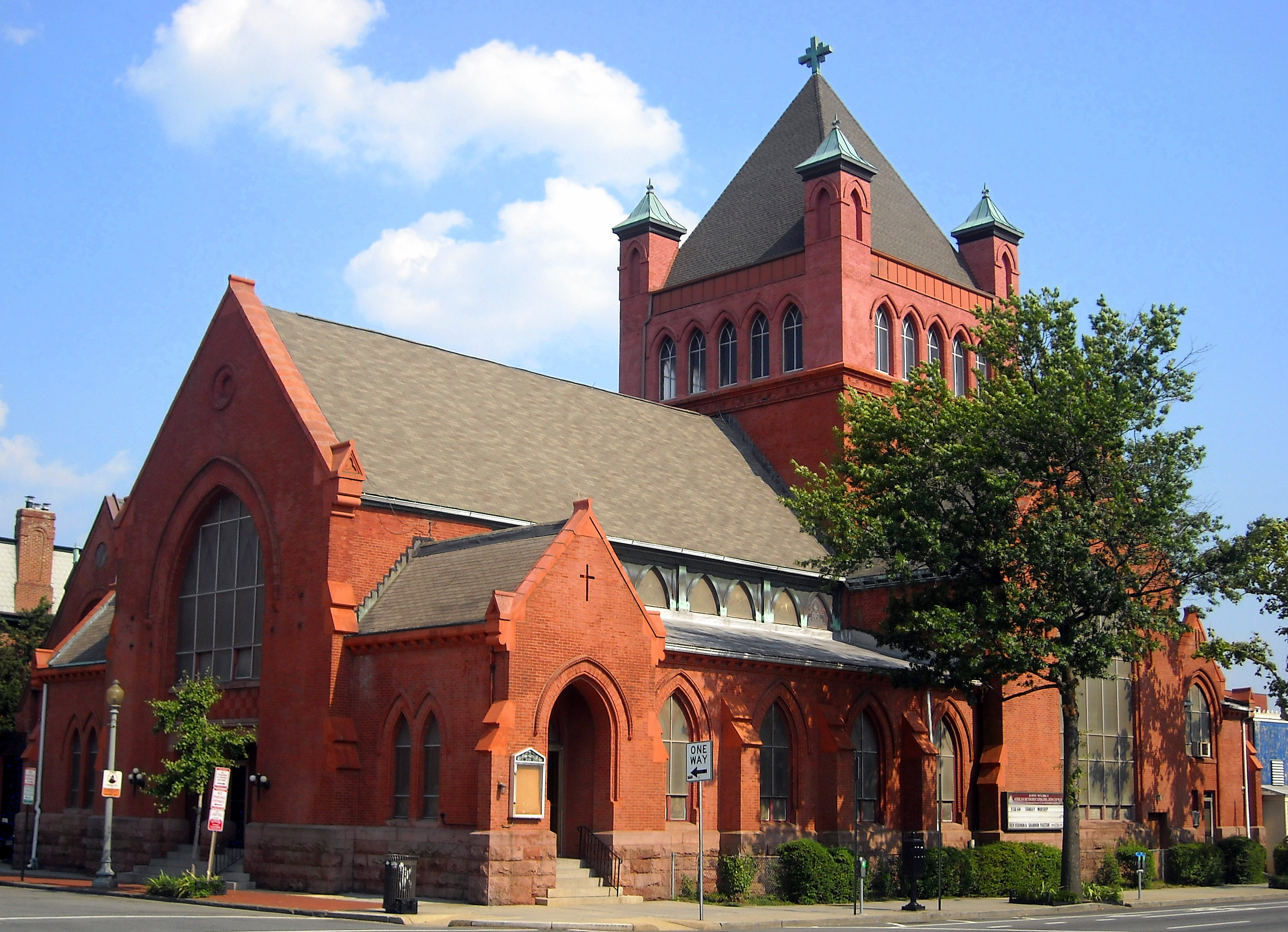
John Wesley A.M.E. Zion Church, located on 14th Street NW

The oldest house of worship in the Fourteenth Street Historic District is Luther Place Memorial Church, built 1870–1873, an ELCA Lutheran church situated on the north side of Thomas Circle. Originally known as Memorial Evangelical Lutheran Church of Washington, D.C., the building was renamed in 1884 after a bronze statue of Martin Luther was installed on the church's property. Luther Place Memorial Church was added to the National Register of Historic Places on July 16, 1973.

The Gladstone and Hawarden, designed by architect George S. Cooper in 1900, are early examples of Washington's middle class apartment houses. Named for U.K. Prime Minister William Gladstone and his estate Hawarden Castle, they are the first documented twin apartment buildings in Washington, D.C. The Gladstone and Hawarden were added to the NRHP on September 7, 1994.

=== Other landmarks ===
The District of Columbia Inventory of Historic Sites includes several properties in Logan Circle that are not listed on the National Register of Historic Places. Among them are the former residences of: Charles Manuel "Sweet Daddy" Grace, flamboyant founder of the United House of Prayer For All People; John A. Lankford, the first African American architect in Washington, D.C.; Belford Lawson Jr., lead attorney in the landmark case New Negro Alliance v. Sanitary Grocery Co.; Alain LeRoy Locke, the first African American Rhodes Scholar and central figure in the Harlem Renaissance; Mary Jane Patterson, the first African American woman to earn a bachelor's degree; Ella Watson, subject of Gordon Parks's famous photograph American Gothic, Washington, D.C.; and James Lesesne Wells, noted graphic artist and longtime art instructor at Howard University.

The Victorian building on the north side of the park, 15 Logan Circle, was built for military officer and diplomat Seth Ledyard Phelps and served as the Korean legation from 1889 to 1905. Following an extensive restoration project, the building now serves as the Old Korean Legation Museum.

The Iowa, designed by Thomas Franklin Schneider in 1901, was the birthplace of anthropologist Julian Steward.

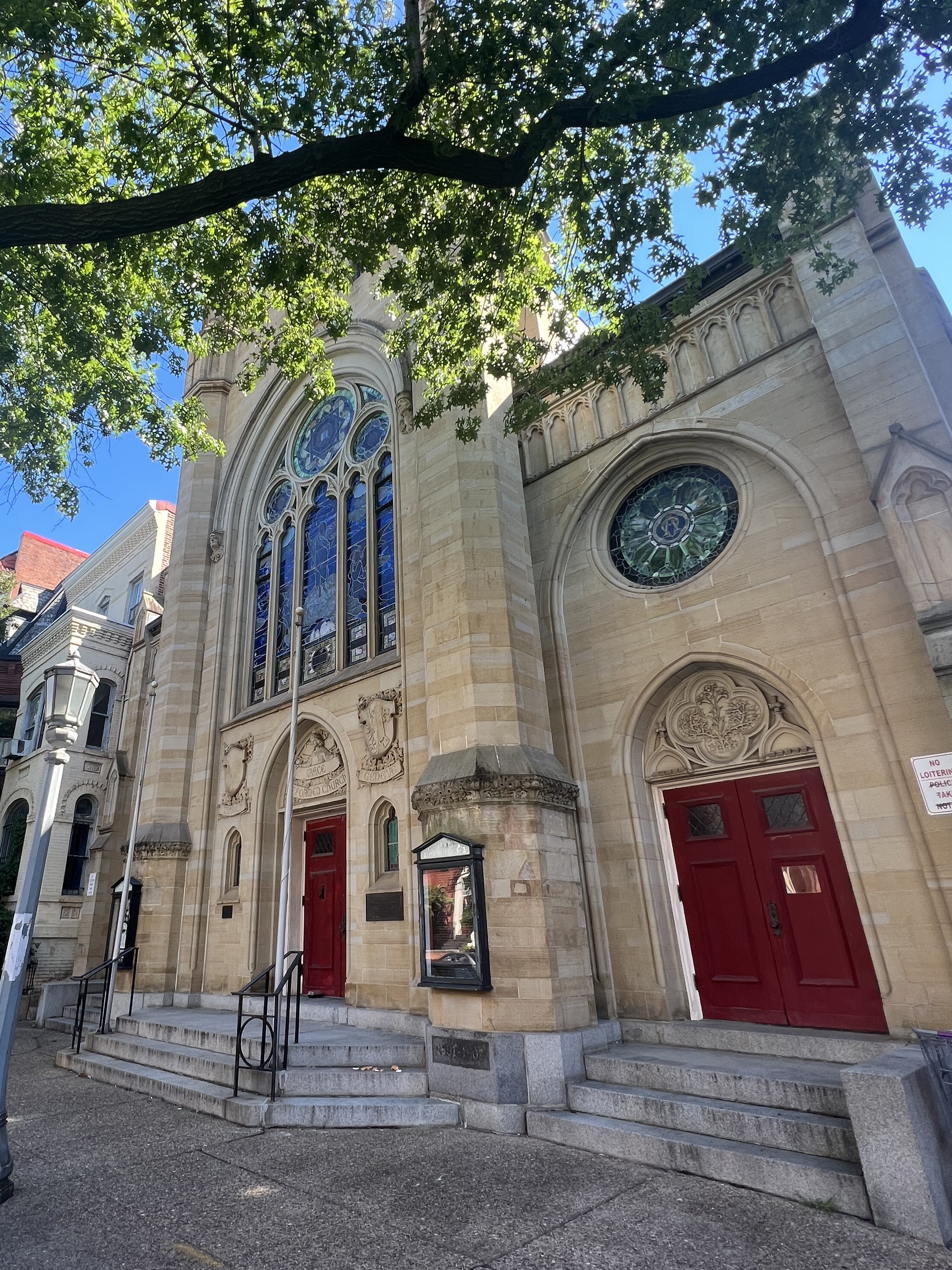
Grace Reformed Church

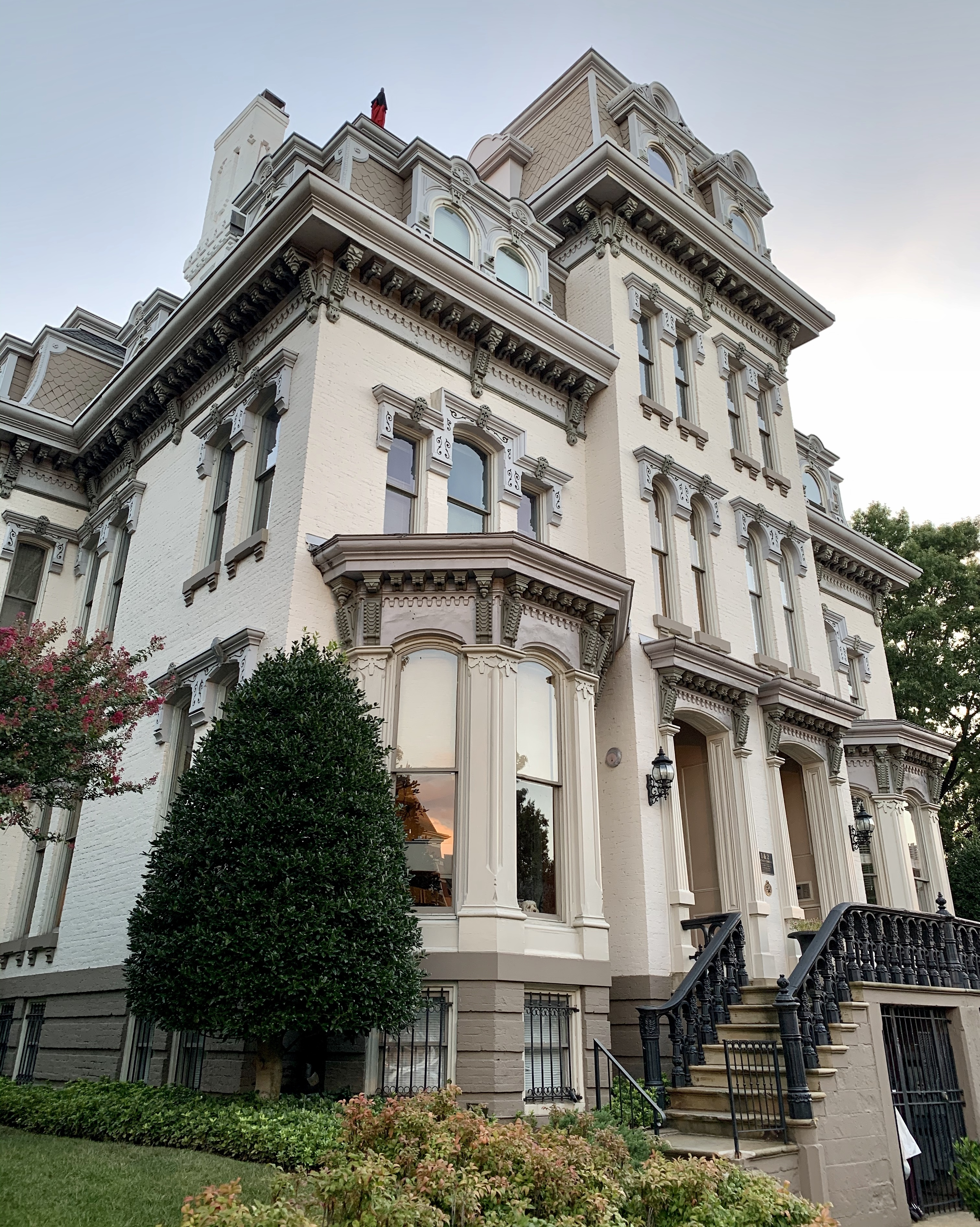
Ulysses Grant House

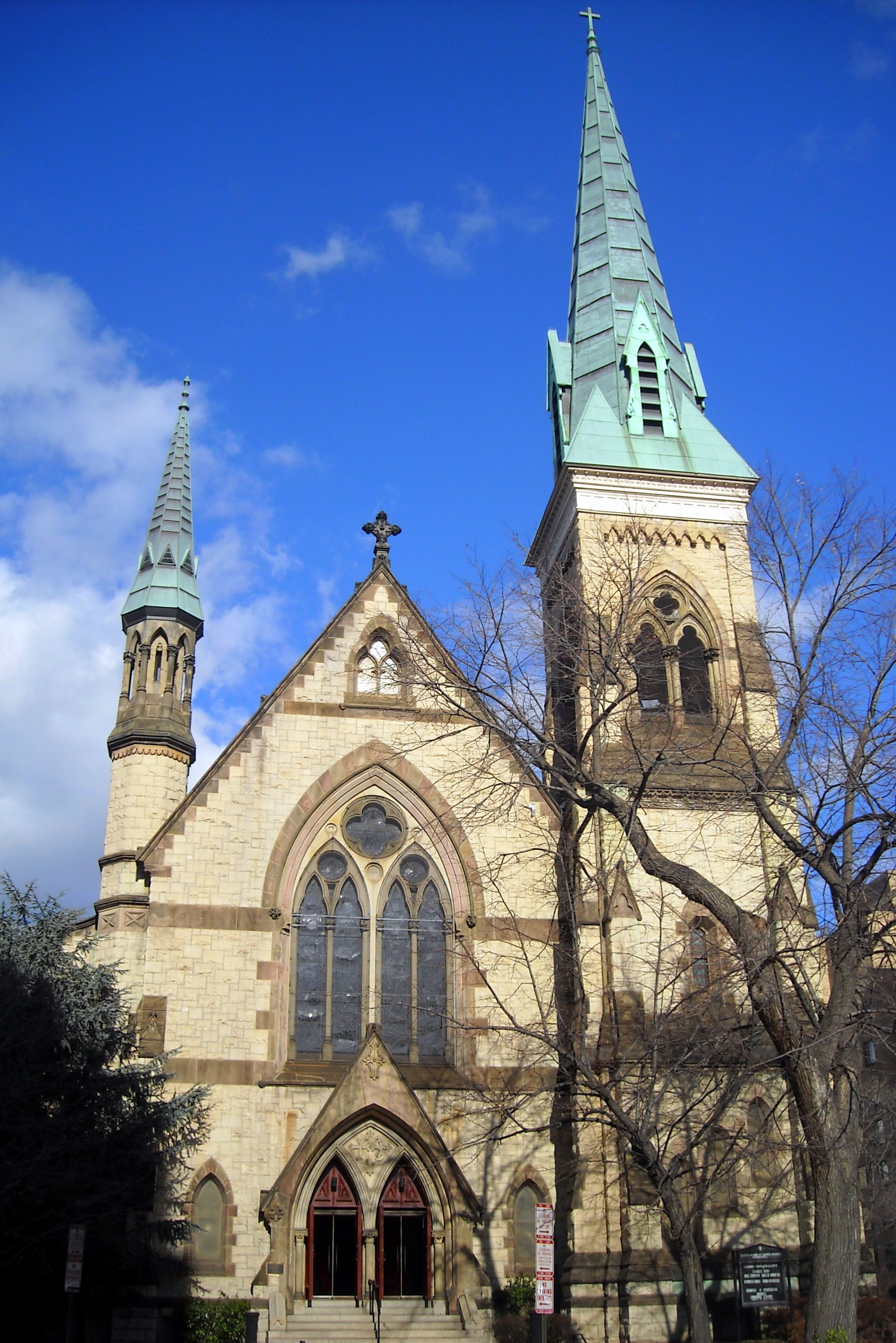
Church of the Ascension

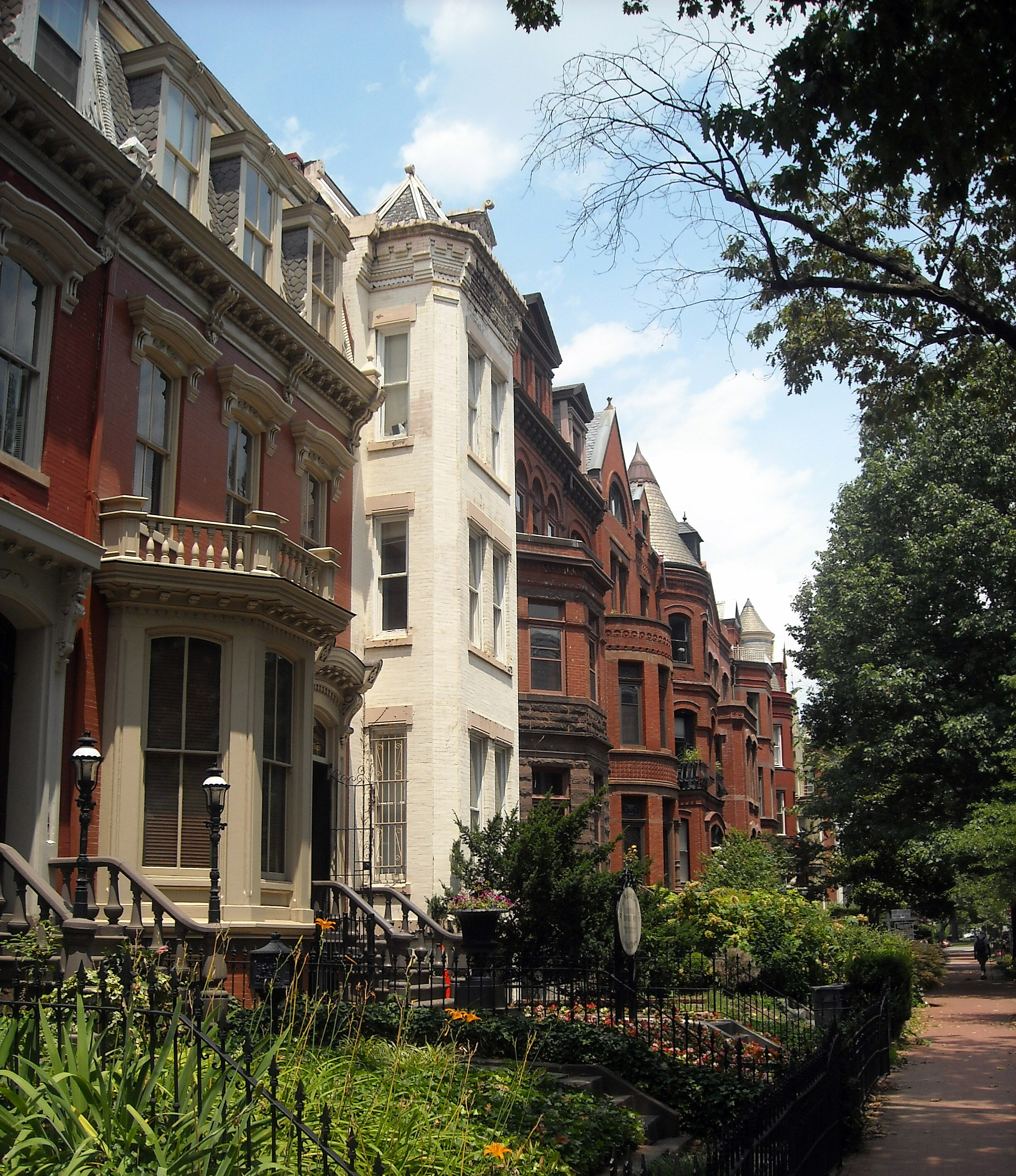
Vermont Avenue

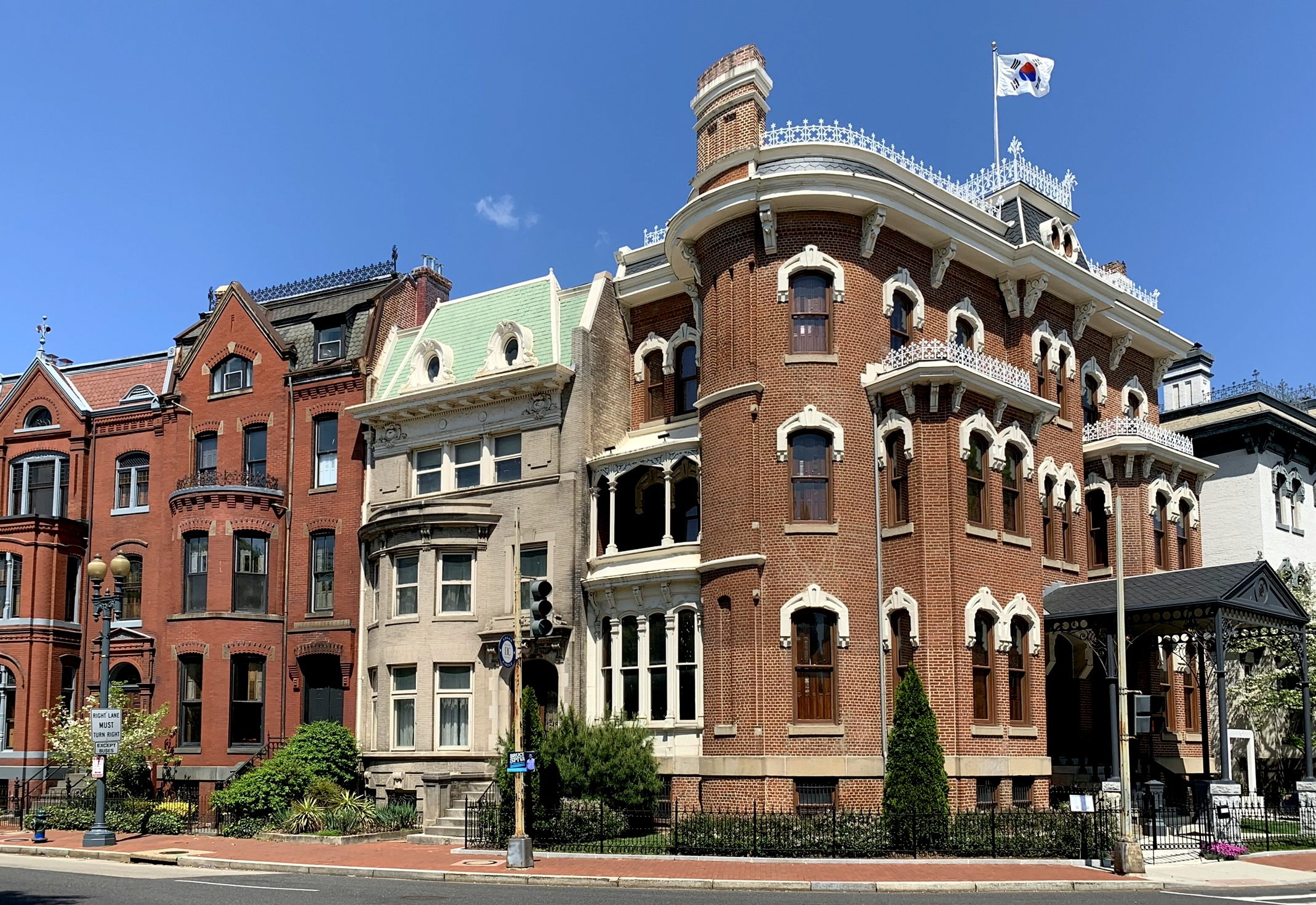
Old Korean Legation Museum

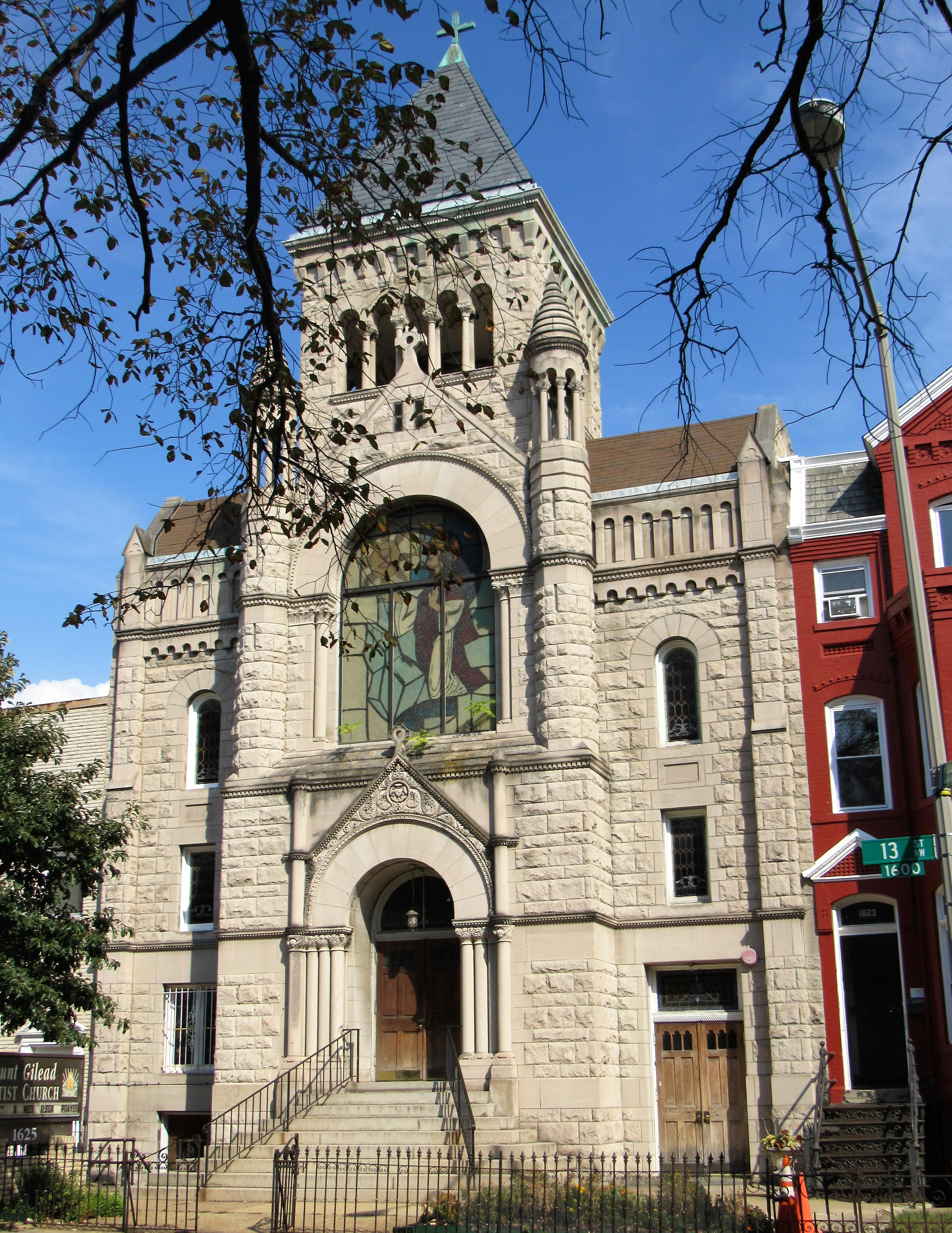
Mt. Gilead Church

== Geography ==
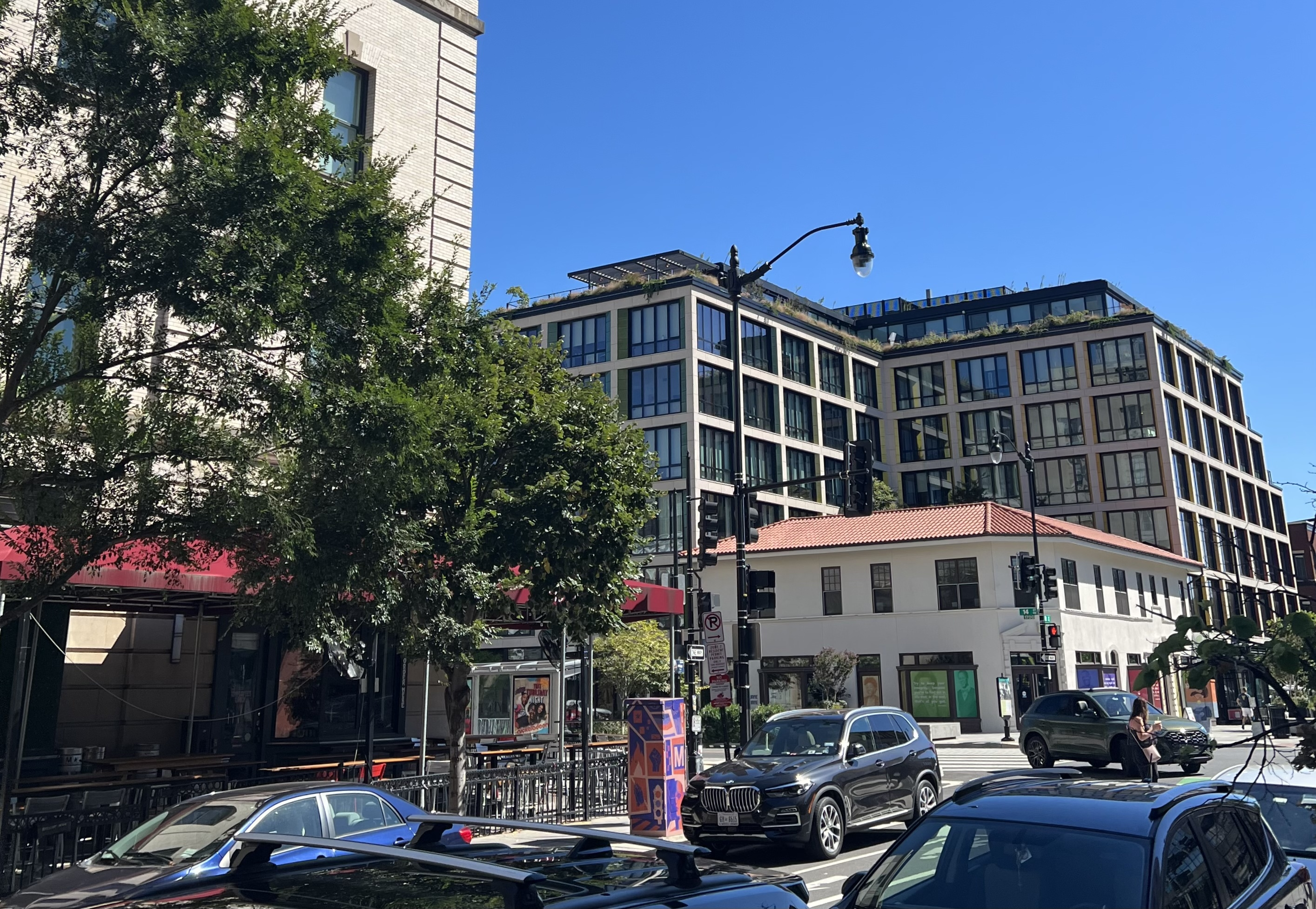
Intersection of 14th St and R St.

The Logan Circle neighborhood is bordered:

- on the north by T Street NW and the U Street Corridor (a.k.a. Cardozo/Shaw);
- on the east by 12th Street NW and the Shaw neighborhood:
- on the south by Massachusetts Avenue or M Street NW and Downtown D.C.
- on the west by 16th Street NW and the Dupont Circle neighborhood

The traffic circle is the intersection of 13th Street, P Street, Rhode Island Avenue, and Vermont Avenue. The National Park Service maintains the land located within the traffic circle, a park measuring 360 feet (110 m) in diameter, furnished with wooden benches, decorative lampposts, an iron fence, and concrete sidewalks.

== Demographics ==
Census	2020	2010	2000	1990	1980	1970	1960
Population	12,391	12,098	11,837	10,932	9,413	12,656	14,267

The racial composition of the neighborhood is in flux, paralleling its gentrification, with the Black population decreasing from around one quarter to around one tenth of the population (2010 to 2020), while the non-Hispanic White proportion increased by around a fifth, going from around 59% to around 70% of the neighborhood's population during those ten years. The Asian population was up 9%,

Race/Ethnicity	Change 2020 vs. 2010	2020	2010
Non-Hispanic (NH) White	+10.7%	70.1%	59.4%
Hispanic or Latino	–2.9%	16.0%	18.9%
NH Black	–14.4%	9.8%	24.2%
NH Asian (2020); NH Asian or Pacific Islander (2010)	+0.3%*	5.0%	4.7%
NH Multiracial	+2.0%	4.5%	2.5%
NH Some other race	–0.1$	0.4%	0.5%
NH American Indian and Alaska Native	+0.2%	0.25%	0.05%
NH Native Hawaiian and Pacific Islander	n/a	0.2%	n/a

Note: population shown is the total of the census tracts covering the area from Massachusetts to S Street and from 11th to 16th streets. in 2020, these were 50.03, 50.04, 52.02, 52.03. In 2010 tracts 50.01, 50.02, and 52.01. from 1960–2000: tracts 50 and 52.01. For 1950 tract 50 and portion of tract 52: blocks 1–19.
- +0.3% plus 0.2% (Asian increase plus Pacific Islander category which was split out in 2020

== Education ==
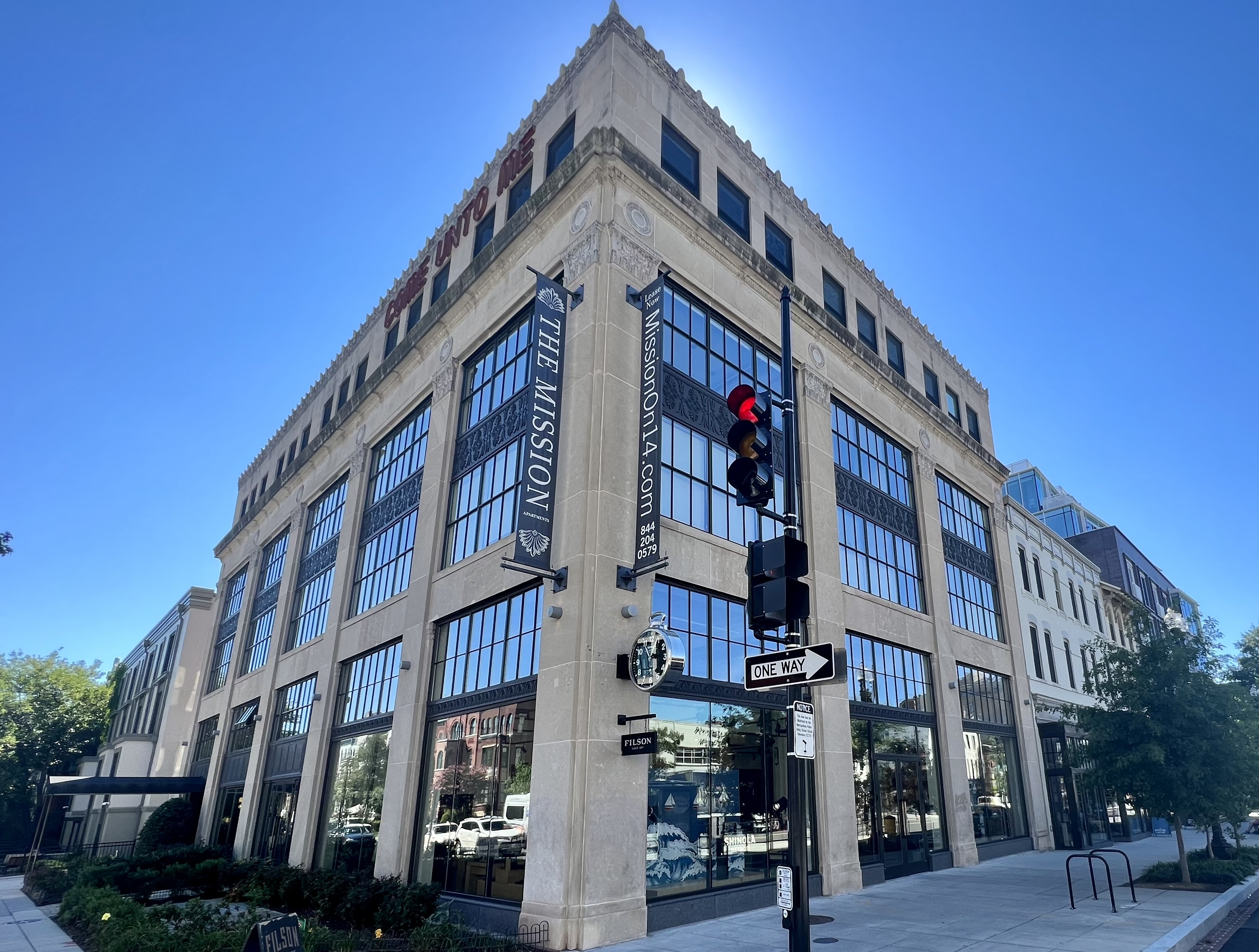
The historic Central Union Mission.

Residents are served by the District of Columbia Public Schools (DCPS). Garrison Elementary School in Logan Circle has a capacity of over 350 students. As of 2013 the school had 228 students. Residents are zoned to Garrison, and to Cardozo Education Campus.

== In popular culture ==
Logan Circle is the setting for Dinaw Mengestu's The Beautiful Things That Heaven Bears, a novel about an Ethiopian American struggling to start a new life in Washington, D.C.

Gil Scott-Heron's 1974 song "The Bottle" describes the lives of the alcoholics living in the area.

== See also ==
- Equestrian Monument of General John A. Logan
