= 2026 Logan Circle shooting =

Mass shooting in Washington, D.C., US

- Memorial at the site of the shooting
- Location: 38.9101°N 77.0338°W; Logan Circle, Washington, D.C., US
- Date: November 12, 2026 c. 8:00 a.m. – 10:00 a.m. (Eastern Standard Time)
- Attack type: Mass shooting • arson
- Weapons: Handgun; Shotgun; Rifle
- Deaths: 2 (including the perpetrator)
- Injuries: 5
- Perpetrator: Matt Lambert
- Motive: Dispute with homeowners association

On November 12, 2026, a 55-year-old man, identified as Matt Lambert, a licensed doctor who owned an apartment unit in the Logan Circle neighborhood, opened fire from his condominium in the Logan Circle neighborhood of Washington, D.C., killing his landlord, before indiscriminately shooting toward the vicinity of a gym, VIDA Fitness, wounding five others.

After barricading himself inside his apartment, he fatally shot himself. He also set fire to parts of the building during the attack, although no one was harmed by the blaze. The shooting occurred less than one mile from the White House.

== Background ==
Matt Lambert was a licensed doctor, primarily working as an emergency room physician throughout his career. He received his Bachelor’s and doctorate’s degrees from the University of West Virginia and Marshall University, respectively. He had owned property in West Virginia, in addition to his penthouse condo in Logan Circle, which was valued at $1.1 million.

Lambert had prior issues with black mold allegedly growing in his condo, which lead to a lawsuit filed against the landlord. Before the shootings, he had invoked a slogan made by Luigi Mangione, the UnitedHealthCare CEO murderer, in what appeared to be his written manifesto.

The shooting followed a prolonged legal dispute with his building’s homeowners association (HOA) regarding mold and water leaks in his penthouse condominium.

== Shootings ==
At around 8 am, the shooter had an argument with his landlord and then opened fire on him, fatally wounding him. Then Lambert sporadically opened fire from his seventh-floor window, hitting five people who had no known connection to him: the victims included a gym-goer who was shot in the back while sitting inside the fitness center. Four people shot on the street included at least one construction worker, and people walking to work or walking their dogs. When a construction worker was shot, he warned his coworkers to flee the scene. One person is hospitalized in a critical but stable condition as of November 14. At some point, Lambert set parts of the building on fire and damaged a gas line in his apartment.

An estimated one to two hours of negotiating between police and Lambert via a phone call ensued, and Lambert fired two rounds towards D.C. Police officers, missing them. He then shot himself in the head, killing himself.

He had used a handgun, shotgun, and a rifle in the attacks. It is unspecified what model or caliber of those firearms he used.
