= Charles Henry Bond =

American businessman

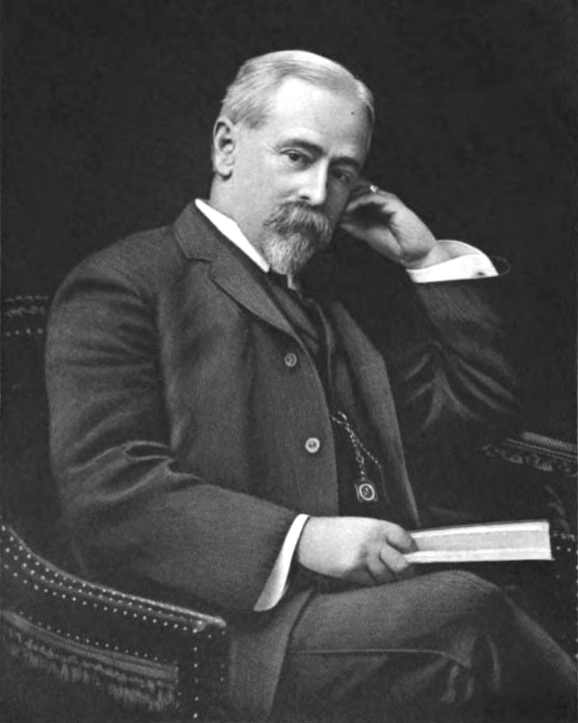
- Born: July 13, 1846; Saugus, Massachusetts, US
- Died: July 3, 1908 (aged 61); Swampscott, Massachusetts, US
- Occupations: Cigar manufacturer Real estate investor
- Political party: Republican
- Children: 4 daughters, 3 sons

Charles Henry Bond (1846–1908) was an American businessman who was president and general manager of Waitt & Bond, one of Boston's largest real estate holders, and a patron of the arts.

== Early life ==
Bond was born on July 13, 1846, in the Cliftondale neighborhood of Saugus, Massachusetts, to Charles Milton Bond Jr. and Mary (Amerige) Bond. During his youth, Bond developed a love for music which would last throughout his life.

== Cigars ==
In 1863, at the age of seventeen, Bond entered the cigar business. In 1870, he and Henry Waitt established Waitt & Bond in a small shop in Saugus. The business grew rapidly, and it was relocated to a large factory in Boston. Waitt & Bond eventually became the largest cigar manufacturer in New England and one of the largest in the United States.

== Real estate ==
With a fortune accumulated from his cigar business, Bond became involved in real estate. He was one of the most active dealers and largest holders of real estate in Boston. He became especially involved in real estate during the final year of his life. Among the properties Bond owned were the Oceanside Hotel in Gloucester's Magnolia village, the Hotel Netherlands on Boylston Street in Boston, and Brandon Hall in Brookline. In 1908, Bond began work on the construction of a theater on Tremont Street in Boston, which was to be known as the Lyric Theatre. The project struggled as a result of the financial hit Bond took in the Panic of 1907 and remained unfinished at the time of Bond's death. In the spring of 1909 the project was taken over by The Shubert Organization, and the theater was renamed the Shubert Theatre.

Bond also owned a number of properties in Washington, D.C., including the Bond Building.

== Personal life ==
Bond was twice married. In 1872 he married Martha A. Morrison of Lawrence, Massachusetts. The couple had two children. His second wife was Isabelle "Belle" Bacon of Washington, D.C. She and Bond had five children: Edith Louise (Stearns), Mildred Mary (Rogers), Kenneth Bacon, Charles Lawrence and Priscilla Isabelle.

He maintained a residence in Cliftondale until 1899, when he moved to a home on Commonwealth Avenue in Boston. He also owned Peacehaven, a summer estate in Swampscott, Massachusetts.

A Unitarian, Bond and was a member of the Second Church of Boston. For many years he was a member of the church's standing committee as well as its music committee. During his later years, Bond became interested in Christian Science.

Bond was a staunch member of the Republican Party. He was occasionally involved in politics, but never held elected office. He was also a member of numerous clubs and fraternal organizations, including the Freemasons, Knights Templar, the Tedesco Country Club, and the Sons of Colonial Wars.

== Philanthropy ==
In 1885, Bond founded the Cliftondale Public Library. He served as the Library Association president and was a member of Saugus' first Water Board and a trustee of the Saugus Public Library as well. Bond also gave Saugus land to construct the Cliftondale School. His donations to the Saugus camp of the Sons of Union Veterans of the Civil War were credited for its success, and the camp was named in Bond's honor.

A patron of the arts, he provided funding for the training of many vocal artists, including Geraldine Farrar. He was a member of the Boston Art Club and served on its entertainment committee. Bond was also a trustee of the New England Conservatory of Music.

Bond offered an award known as the Bond Speaking Prize to the most proficient students at Saugus High School, Wesleyan University, and New Orleans University. He also aided students at St. Lawrence University.

== Death ==
On July 3, 1908, Bond was found dead in a bathtub in his summer residence. Medical Examiner Joseph G. Pinkham ruled the cause of death as drowning and that the death was accidental. However, it was reported that Bond left a note in his bedroom which read, "I have been killed by my friends and enemies. It is more than I can bear. I can stand it no longer. My heart is broken. I leave everything to my wife." At the time of his death, it was believed that Bond's real estate ventures threatened his fortune. One month before his death, all of Bond's properties were placed in the hands of trustees. The Washington Post reported that Bond's dissatisfaction with the trustees' actions may have caused him to take his life.

After his death, Bond's wife, Bella Bacon Bond, donated money for Bond Hall to be built in his honor at the MacDowell Colony in Peterborough, New Hampshire. In 1933, his daughter Edith Louise founded The Peterborough Players, a professional theatre arts company in Peterborough, NH.
