= Henry Waitt =

American businessman

Henry Waitt (died 1902) was an American businessman who co-founded Waitt & Bond with Charles Henry Bond.

Waitt was born in Malden, Massachusetts. He spent most of his life in the Franklin Park section (also known as North Revere) of Revere, Massachusetts. Waitt became involved in the tobacco business.

In 1870, he and Bond established Waitt & Bond in a shop in Saugus, Massachusetts. The business grew rapidly and it was relocated to a large factory in Boston. Waitt & Bond eventually became the largest cigar manufacturer in New England and one of the largest in the United States.

In 1898, Waitt moved to Newton, Massachusetts. He died on May 7, 1902, at his home after an illness.

The city of Revere named the elementary school in Franklin Park after Waitt. The Henry Waitt School opened in 1910 and was sold to a private owner in 1980.
