= 1919 Boston cigar makers' strike =

Labor strike in Massachusetts, US

On July 7, 1919, roughly 2,100 of Boston's 2,400 cigar makers walked off the job in protest of their employer's failure to meet their demand of a 13 7/11% raise. Three of Boston's largest cigar manufacturers chose to leave the city rather than meet the union's demands and a number of union members formed a cigar-making co-operative. By August 30, 1919, all of the remaining manufacturers had reached agreements with the union.

== Early labor struggles ==
During the early years of World War I, Boston's cigar factories hired many refugees from Belgium. In addition to being expert cigar makers, many of them were socialists. After this, the manufacturers clashed with the local union, who threatened to strike if the manufacturers hired more employees, implemented the use of machinery, weighed tobacco, ended the practice of cigar makers using their mouths to shape cigars, or dismissed an employee without the consent of a union committee. On January 24, 1919, the Boston Cigar Makers' Union adopted a resolution calling for "all the land and workshops and public utilities" to "be conscripted for control by the A. F. of L., in the interest of all of the people" and that "the working class take over the control of wealth production". Cigar Makers' International Union President George W. Perkins criticized the amendment as an "attempt to fasten upon the International Union...a communistic, socialistic, soviet form of government". On June 19, 1919, Perkins wrote that the proposed strike by the cigar makers would "put the Boston seed cigar entirely out of the market...How much longer the Boston manufacturers can continue to pay these demands, with the many restrictions thrown around them, is a mighty serious question".

== Walkout ==
On July 7, 1919, more than 2,000 of the 2,400 members of the Cigarmakers' Union, Local 97 walked out against manufacturers who failed to implement a 13 7/11% wage increase. This shut down Boston's large cigar manufacturers, including Waitt & Bond, H. Traiser, C. C. A., Breslin & Campbell, Elcho, M. C. A., and Alles & Fisher. A number of the smaller shops who had granted the increase were able to continue production. A strike at the R. G. Sullivan factory in Manchester, New Hampshire was ongoing at the time of the Boston strike.

Gustave A. Rothfuss, secretary of the Boston Cigar Manufacturers' Association, accused Local 97 of making repeating wage demands and of striking without the sanction of the Cigar Makers' International Union. He also stated that the manufacturers would refuse to consider the cigar makers demand that "no firm shall discharge an employe without first consulting the grievance committee". Rothfuss claimed that the wage increase would raise the price of a ten-cent cigar to fifteen cents, while William Collins contended the increase would be less than 1/4th of a cent. Collins blamed the manufacturers for increased prices, stating that from 1906 to 1919, cigar manufacturers have increased their prices by $30 per 1,000 cigars, while cigar makers had only received a raise of $3.80 per 1,000 cigars made. Waitt & Bond cited increased wages of cigar packers, tobacco stripers, and general workers, increased federal taxes on cigars, increased tobacco prices, and other increased expenses, including freight and insurance rates, as the reason for the increased price and went on to state that Boston's cigar manufacturers were operating at the lowest profit since the establishment of the industry.

== Departure of manufacturers ==
On August 13, 1919, Waitt & Bond announced that they would move from Boston to Newark, New Jersey as a result of the walkout. Prior to the strike, Waitt & Bond had employed 1,200 cigar makers and had a weekly payroll of $30,000. Upon moving to Newark, Waitt & Bond operated on a non-union machine production basis. Other cigars makers followed suit. C. C. A. also moved to Newark while Breslin & Campbell moved to New York City. Both switched to machine production.

== Co-operative ==
Following Waitt & Bond and C. C. A.'s departure, the Boston Union Cigarmaker's Co-operative was formed. The Co-operative began with 50 cigar workers and $90,000 worth of capital. Morris Becker, a cigar maker who had put himself through Suffolk Law School, was the Co-operative's first manager. Its factory was a former bowling alley. Although all of the Co-operative's employees were union members, the union officially had nothing to do with the business. The Co-operative operated on a "one-man, one-vote" system, which entitled a member to only one vote no matter how many shares he held.

By February 1920, 100 cigar makers were employed. By that December, the co-operative was the third largest cigar factory in Boston.

On October 8, 1921, five creditors filed a bankruptcy petition against the Co-operative. According to the February 18, 1922 issue of Industrial Relations "Lack of business training, acumen and experience seems to be the generally accepted reason for the failure". All of the Co-operative's departments, except for bookkeeping and accounting, were staffed by cigar makers, which resulted in buyers and salesmen with little experience. Becker also criticized the accounting department, which he stated was "run by a man who owed his position to a feeling of sympathy by certain members". Industrial Relations also faulted the Co-operative for not making an effort to take advantage of special seasonal demands and stated that "the generally accepted...final blow was due to a decision of the Board of Directors not to center their activities in New England, but to open up a market in New York City". The Co-operative's rights were sold to a Boston cigar factory superintendent for $5,500.

== Resolution of the strike ==
The strike ended on August 30, 1919, when the Sullivan factory in Manchester and the cigar makers agreed on a compromise of $20 per 1,000 cigars made (down from the union's original demand of $21). By that time, H. Traiser, Elcho, M. C. A., and Alles & Fisher had all resumed production.
