= Waitt & Bond =

American former cigar manufacturer

- Waitt & Bond cigar sign
- Industry: Tobacco
- Founded: 1870
- Defunct: 1969
- Fate: Closed
- Headquarters: Saugus, Massachusetts (1870–1872); Boston, Massachusetts (1872–1919); Newark, New Jersey (1919–1963); Scranton, Pennsylvania (1963–1969)
- Key people: Charles Henry Bond; Henry Waitt
- Products: Cigars

Waitt & Bond, Inc. was an American cigar manufacturer that was in operation from 1870 to 1969. During the early 20th century it was the largest cigar manufacturer in New England and one of the largest in the United States.

== Early years ==
Waitt & Bond was established in 1870 by Charles Henry Bond and Henry Waitt. They began manufacturing cigars in a small shop in the Cliftondale neighborhood of Saugus, Massachusetts. In 1902 the business was incorporated in Maine. In October 1917 it was incorporated under the laws of Massachusetts.

In 1885, Waitt & Bond, which was then doing business on Blackstone Street in Boston, launched what would become its most famous brand - "Blackstone".

In 1891, Waitt & Bond moved to a large factory on Endicott Street in Boston. Bond remained Waitt & Bond's president and general manager until his death in 1908. After Bond's death, the company was run by William E. Waterman. In 1913 Waitt & Bond moved into its newly built factory, which was the largest cigar factory in the world under one roof. Located at 716 Columbus Avenue, it contained automated machinery for handling tobacco as well as facilities for humidifying, storing, and routing the product.

== Labor troubles and the switch to machine manufacturing ==
During the early years of World War I, Waitt & Bond hired many refugees from Belgium. In addition to being expert cigar makers, many of them were socialists. After this, Waitt & Bond clashed with the local union, who threatened to strike if the company hired more employees, implemented the use of machinery, weighed tobacco, ended the practice of cigar makers using their mouths to shape cigars, or dismissed an employee without the consent of a union committee.

On July 7, 1919, workers in all of Boston's major cigar factories walked off the job. On August 13, Waitt & Bond announced that it was leaving Boston and relocating to Newark, New Jersey. Once in Newark, the company switched from manufacturing by hand to manufacturing by machine. They were able to resume production six months after the strike was called. After Waitt & Bond adopted the use of machinery, other cigar manufacturers began to follow suit and by 1924 almost every other large cigar manufacturer was either using it or experimenting with it. The switch to machine manufacturing allowed Waitt & Bond to substantially increase its production. This, along with the move to a more central location for distribution, gave the company the ability to go after the national market.

From 1929 to 1939, Waitt & Bond was a subsidiary of Porto Rican American Tobacco. In March of 1938, severance for Waitt Bond Inc., from the tobacco companies (including Porto Rican American Tobaccos Companies and the Congress Cigar Company Inc.,) was announced in the NY Times.

In 1943, Waterman died and Harley W. Jefferson, a longtime tobacco executive who had most recently served as head of the tobacco section of the War Production Board, was chosen to succeed him. Jefferson resigned as president in 1956 at the age of 72, but remained with the company as a director and consulting chairman. He was succeeded as president by Thomas A. Hansbury, Waitt & Bond's secretary-treasurer.

In 1955, the company acquired the cigar-making assets of the D. Emil Klein Company, which then changed its name to Demlein Corp. In 1961 it acquired Alles & Fisher, Inc., which produced the JA, '63, and Pippin cigar brands.

== Later years, renaming, and closure ==
In 1962, Hansbury resigned and chairman Edward Rapaport assumed his duties on a temporary basis. Fred A. Roff, Jr., former president of Colt's Manufacturing Company, was elected president in 1964.

In 1963, the company headquarters moved from Newark to Scranton, Pennsylvania. In June 1964, Waitt & Bond's stockholders voted at their annual meeting to rename the company the Blackstone Cigar Co. after its most popular brand. In 1969 the company closed.

== See also ==
- List of cigar brands
