= Lafayette Apartment Building (Washington, D.C.) =

- U.S. National Register of Historic Places
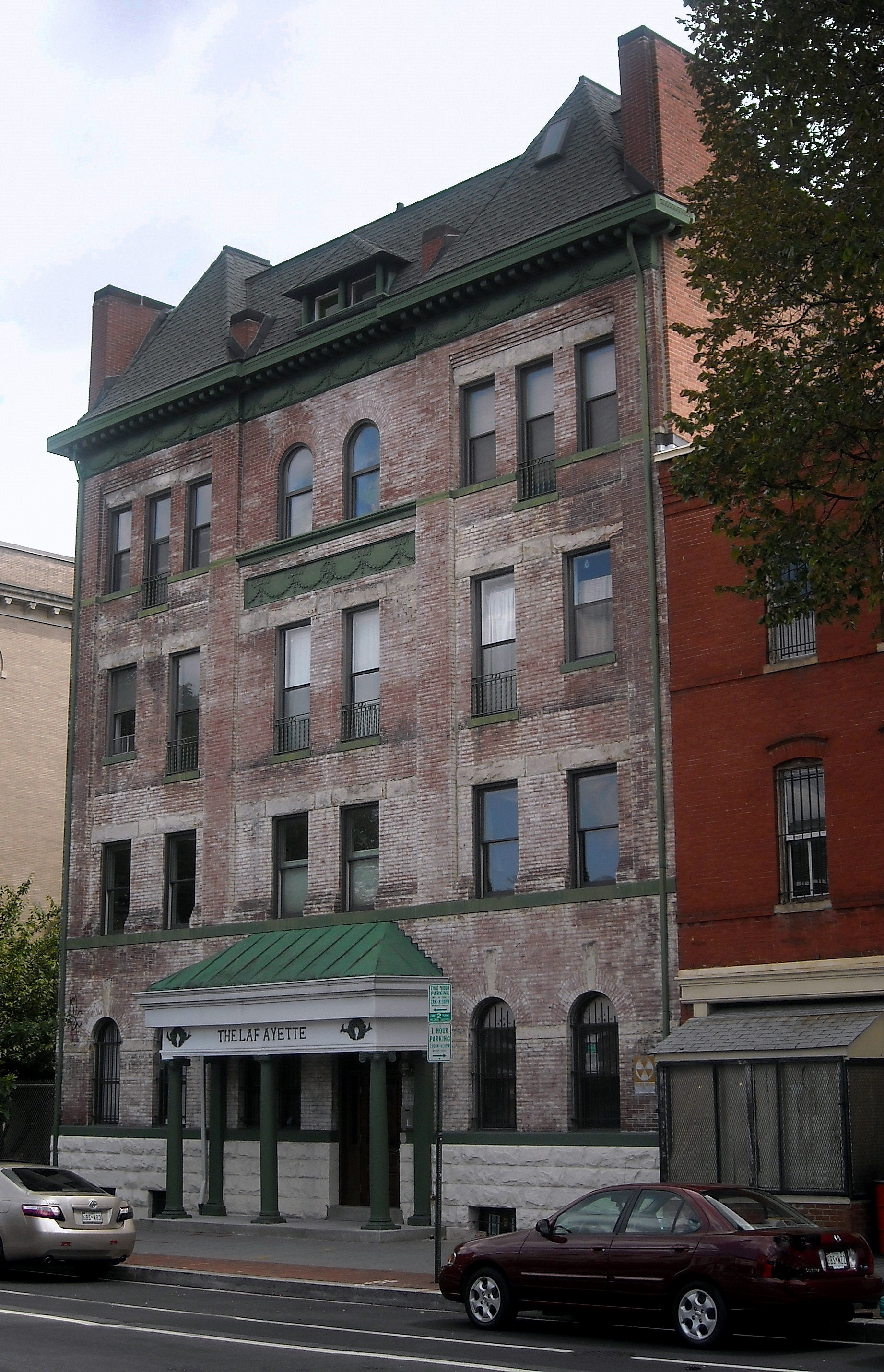

- Location within Washington, D.C.
- Location: 1605-1607 7th St., NW; Washington, D.C.
- Coordinates: 38°54′42″N 77°1′18″W
- Built: 1898
- Architect: George S. Cooper
- Architectural style: Queen Anne Revival
- NRHP reference No.: 94001044
- Added to NRHP: September 7, 1994

The Lafayette Apartment Building is an historic structure located in the Shaw neighborhood in the Northwest Quadrant of Washington, D.C. George S. Cooper was the architect for this building, which was one of the earliest apartment buildings in Washington. Built in 1898 it incorporated elements of the Queen Anne style into an affordable middle-class development. It was listed on the National Register of Historic Places in 1994.
