= Bond Building =

- U.S. National Register of Historic Places
- D.C. Inventory of Historic Sites
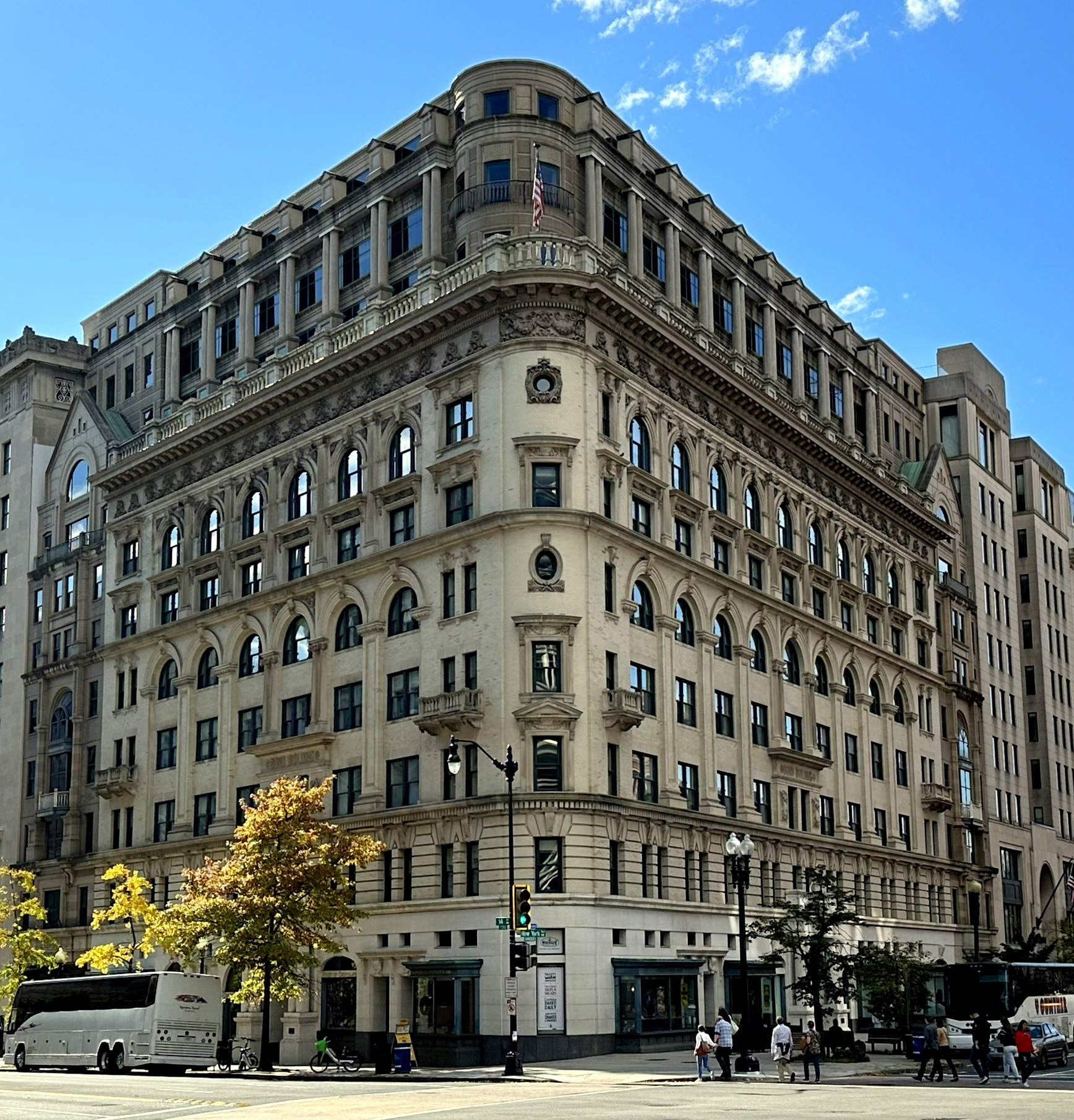
- Bond Building in 2023

- Location within Central Washington, D.C. Location within the District of Columbia Location within the United States
- Location: 1404 New York Avenue, N.W., Washington, D.C.
- Coordinates: 38°53′56.4″N 77°1′56.3″W
- Built: 1901; 125 years ago
- Architect: George S. Cooper
- NRHP reference No.: 83001415

Significant dates
- Added to NRHP: September 15, 1983
- Designated DCIHS: September 18, 1980

The Bond Building is an historic office building located at 1400 New York Avenue, N.W., in downtown Washington, D.C. It was designed by architect George S. Cooper in 1901. The building was constructed by Charles Henry Bond, for an estimated $300,000. A developer bought the building in 1979, and applied for a demolition permit.

In 1980, D.C. Superior Court Judge William E. Stewart, Jr. blocked demolition in 1980. In 1983, the building was listed on the National Register of Historic Places.
