= Jefferson Apartment Building (Washington, D.C.) =

- U.S. National Register of Historic Places
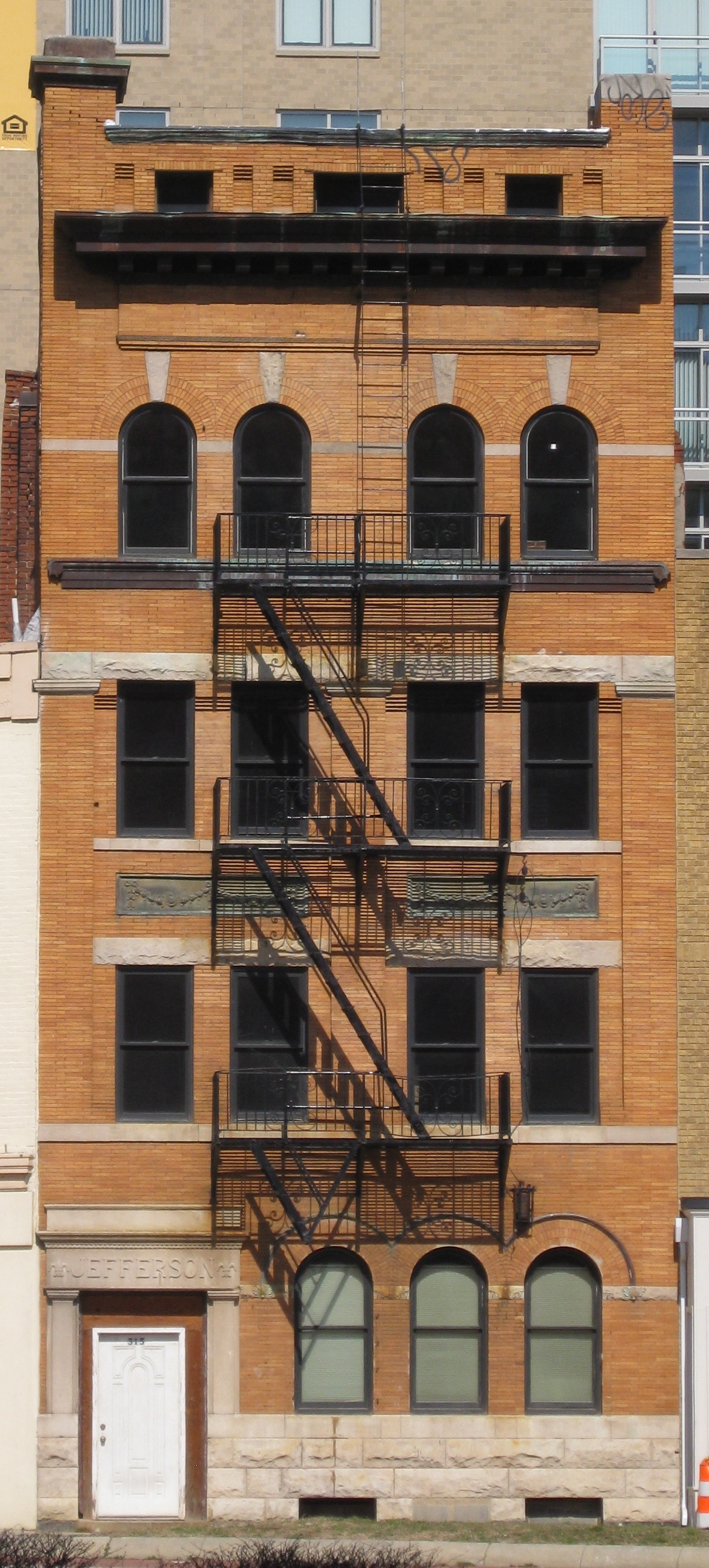

- Location within Washington, D.C.
- Location: 315 H Street NW; Washington, D.C.
- Coordinates: 38°54′1″N 77°0′57″W
- Built: 1899; 127 years ago
- Architect: George S. Cooper
- Architectural style: Romanesque Revival
- MPS: Apartment Buildings in Washington, DC, MPS
- NRHP reference No.: 94001046
- Added to NRHP: September 7, 1994

The Jefferson Apartment Building is an historic structure located in the Mount Vernon Triangle neighborhood of Washington, D.C. The small middle-class apartment building was designed by George S. Cooper, who was a prolific apartment architect in the city. The structure features a Romanesque Revival façade. It was listed on the National Register of Historic Places in 1994.
