= George S. Cooper =

American architect and builder

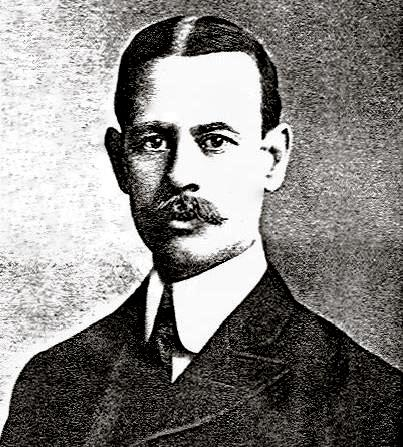
- Born: December 14, 1864; Washington, D.C., U.S.
- Died: March 12, 1929 (aged 64); Washington, D.C., U.S.
- Occupation: Architect

George S. Cooper (December 14, 1864 – March 12, 1929) was an American architect and builder from Washington, D.C. During his 40-year career, he was responsible for designing around 850 properties, including homes, commercial buildings and apartment buildings, several of which are listed on the National Register of Historic Places (NRHP). The 1903 book History of the City of Washington states: "It may be thought that Mr. Cooper's forte lies in the designing of apartment houses, since the handsomest in the city are a result of his genius..." and "No young man has played a more important part in the active growth and great development of Greater Washington than George S. Cooper..."

== Biography ==
Cooper was born in Washington, D.C., to Henry C. and Georgeanna J. Cooper, natives of Kentucky. Following his education in Washington public schools, he received private tutoring in architecture. In the 1880s, he began his first job in the architectural field as a draftsman for Gray and Page, a local firm specializing in Victorian architecture. He then worked for the prominent firm Hornblower & Marshall for about a year before joining Alfred B. Mullett's firm. Cooper and B. Carlyle Fenwick opened their own office in 1886, though Cooper later established his own successful practice in 1888.

Throughout Cooper's 40-year career, he designed single-family dwellings and office buildings, but he's most known for his apartment designs. Although the first apartment building in Washington, D.C., the Portland Flats, had been erected in 1880, Cooper's designs "played a significant role in the development of the local type and its acceptance for middle-class living." Cooper's first apartment design was the Montrose Flats, built in 1892 and located at 1115 9th Street NW (now demolished). He was the first local architect to lower design costs by replicating plans for apartment buildings, a practice that became very popular in late 19th and early 20th century Washington. His first such venture, The Gladstone and The Hawarden, are the first documented twin apartment buildings in the city. His work encouraged the city's middle class citizens to accept the changing demography and no longer see apartment buildings as only for the upper and lower classes. Cooper would go on to design 24 apartment buildings between 1892 and 1909, with his last works being The Westchester (now Barlcay North) at 1332 15th Street NW, and Dumbarton Court, located at 1657 31st Street NW.

Cooper was also a prolific designer of homes, especially in what was then considered Washington's suburbs as well as developed neighborhoods like Dupont Circle and Foggy Bottom. He designed the first town houses in Kalorama Triangle, a row of houses on Wyoming Avenue constructed in 1895, and was responsible for developing and designing many homes in the Washington Heights neighborhood (present day Adams Morgan). Cooper's work was not limited to Washington, D.C. He was among the prominent architects responsible for designing homes in Chevy Chase Village in Maryland.

== Personal life ==
In 1884, Cooper married Margaret H. Steir and the couple had four children: Freddie (b. 1886), Daisy (b. 1887), Helen (b. 1890) and George Jr. (b. 1896) The family lived at 1807 R Street NW in Dupont Circle until moving to a new home, designed by Cooper, at 1620 T Street NW. During his career, Cooper progressed from being just an architect to becoming a designer, developer, and owner of several properties in the city. He was active in the Board of Trade, served on the board of directors of the Southern Maryland Trust Company, and became a member of the Washington City Club. Cooper was also an accomplished singer who performed at local churches, including the Church of the Incarnation and St. John's Episcopal Church, and served as president of the Damrosch Musical Society. He retired in the 1920s. Cooper died on March 12, 1929, at Emergency Hospital in Washington, D.C.

== Selected works ==
- 1400–1408 5th Street NW (1899)
- 1427–1431 New Jersey Avenue NW (1888)
- 1521–1523 Vermont Avenue NW
- 1605 7th Street NW (1898)
- 1612–1636 6th Street NW (1889)
- 1620 T Street NW (1900)
- 1628 19th Street NW (1891)
- 1800–1804 Belmont Road NW (1900)
- 1819–1827 Wyoming Avenue NW (1908)
- 1837–1841 California Street NW (1903)
- 1910 S Street NW (1908)
- 2142-2144 F Street NW (1890)
- 2406–2410 18th Street NW (1900)
- The Analoston (1893) – 1718 Corcoran Street NW
- The Balfour (1900) – 2000 16th Street NW
- Barlcay North (1909) 1332 15th Street NW
- The Berkeley (1902) – 1733 Willard Street NW
- Bond Building (1901) – 1404 New York Avenue NW
- The Carrolton (1902) – 1735 Willard Street NW
- The Decatur (1903) – 2131 Florida Avenue NW
- Dumbarton Court (1909) – 1657 31st Street NW
- The Gladstone and The Hawarden (1900, 1901) – 1419 and 1423 R Street NW
- The Hampton (1906) – 1740 18th Street NW
- The Jefferson (1899) – 315 H Street NW
- The Lafayette (1898) – 1605–1607 7th Street NW
- Laogai Museum (formerly The Real World: D.C. house) (1891) – 2000 S Street NW
- Malnati House (1902) – 712 East Capitol Street NE
- The Oneida (1901) – 147 R Street NE
- The Ononadaga (1901) – 149 R Street NE
- The Pebbleton (1901) – 1747 Church Street NW
- President's Office, George Washington University (1892) – 2003 G Street NW
- The Saint Clair (1903) – 1717 T Street NW
- Scott-Grant House (1907 renovation) – 3238 R Street NW
