= President's Office, George Washington University =

Historic house in Washington, D.C., United States

- U.S. National Register of Historic Places
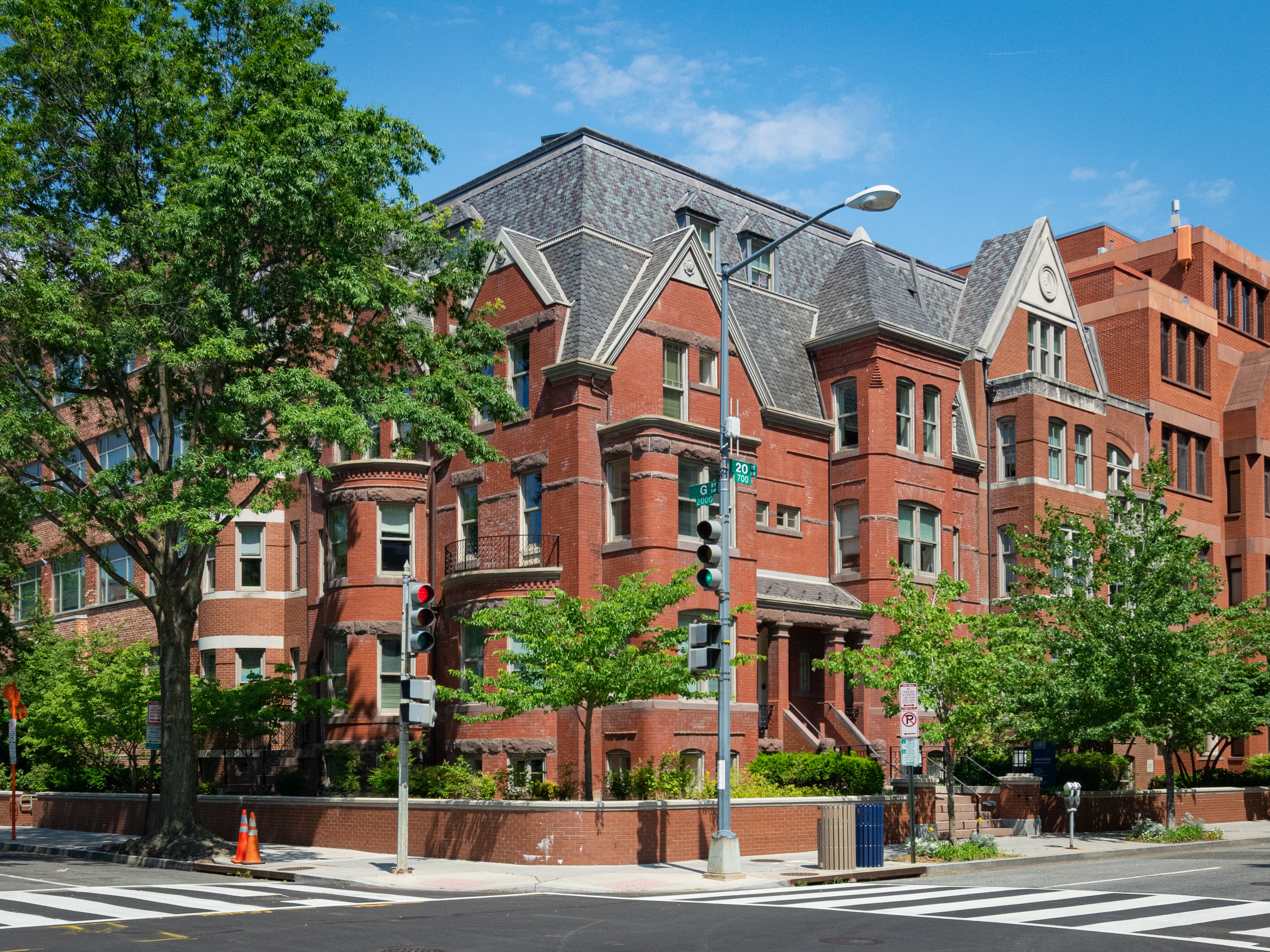
- The President's Office at George Washington University, built in 1892

- Location within Central Washington, D.C. Location within the District of Columbia Location within the United States
- Location: 2003 G Street NW, Washington, D.C.
- Coordinates: 38°53′55″N 77°02′42″W
- Area: Washington, D.C., U.S.
- Built: 1892
- Architect: George S. Cooper and Victor Mendeleff
- Architectural style: Second Empire
- NRHP reference No.: 90001544
- Added to NRHP: September 13, 1991

President's Office, George Washington University is a row of historic townhouses at 2003 G Street, N.W. in Washington, D.C., in the Foggy Bottom section of the city. The townhouses are now part of George Washington University Law School.

== History ==
The townhouses were designed by George S. Cooper and Victor Mendeleff for owner John W. Foster, and built by Theodore A. Harding, in 1892, in the Second Empire style.

Between 1928 and 1934, the townhouses were acquired by George Washington University as a part of a campus expansion led by Cloyd Heck Marvin.

Between 2000 and 2002, they were remodeled.

The buildings are listed on the National Register of Historic Places.
