= National Register of Historic Places listings in central Washington, D.C. =

This is a list of properties and districts listed on the National Register of Historic Places in the central area of Washington, D.C. For the purposes of this list central Washington, D. C. is defined as all of the Northwest quadrant east of Rock Creek and south of M Street and all of the Southwest quadrant. This includes the National Mall, Downtown, the Penn Quarter, the Monumental Core and most of the popular tourist sites in Washington.

This National Park Service list is complete through NPS recent listings posted October 2, 2026.

== Current listings ==
	Name on the Register	Image	Date listed	Location	Neighborhood	Description
1	2nd Baptist Church	2nd Baptist Church	June 30, 2004 (#04000625)	816 3rd St. NW; 38°54′09″N 77°00′57″W	Mount Vernon Triangle	
2	2000 Block of Eye Street, NW	2000 Block of Eye Street, NW	August 9, 1977 (#77001496)	South side of 2000 block of Eye St., NW. 38°54′00″N 77°02′46″W	George Washington University	Currently owned and operated by George Washington University for retail and commercial spaces.
3	Adas Israel Synagogue	Adas Israel Synagogue	March 24, 1969 (#69000288)	3rd and G Sts., NW. 38°53′52″N 77°01′11″W	Downtown East	Now The Lillian & Albert Small Capital Jewish Museum
4	Alibi Club	Alibi Club	October 21, 1994 (#94001221)	1806 Eye St., NW. 38°54′04″N 77°02′32″W	Golden Triangle	
5	American Federation of Labor Building	American Federation of Labor Building	September 13, 1974 (#74002154)	901 Massachusetts Ave., NW. 38°54′12″N 77°01′28″W	Mount Vernon Square	
6	American Institute of Pharmacy Building	American Institute of Pharmacy Building	August 18, 1977 (#77001497)	2215 Constitution Ave., NW. 38°53′34″N 77°02′59″W	Monumental Core	
7	American Peace Society	American Peace Society	September 13, 1974 (#74002155)	734 Jackson Pl., NW. 38°53′58″N 77°02′19″W	Monumental Core	Headquarters of the American Peace Society from 1911 to 1948; in the Lafayette Square Historic District
8	American Red Cross National Headquarters	American Red Cross National Headquarters	October 15, 1966 (#66000853)	17th and D Sts., NW; 38°53′41″N 77°02′26″W	Monumental Core	
9	American Revolution Statuary	American Revolution Statuary	July 14, 1978 (#78000256)	Public buildings and various parks within DC; 38°53′54″N 77°02′16″W	Monumental Core	11 statues in central DC, including G. Washington, B. Franklin, N. Hale, J.P. Jones, J. Barry, E. Burke, C. Pulaski, de Lafayette, T. Kosciuszko, von Steuben, and de Rochambeau and 3 statues in other districts
10	American Security and Trust Company Building	American Security and Trust Company Building	July 16, 1973 (#73002070)	15th and Pennsylvania Ave., NW. 38°53′56″N 77°02′03″W	Golden Triangle	
11	Elizabeth Arden Building	Elizabeth Arden Building	August 18, 2003 (#03000778)	1147 Connecticut Ave. 38°54′18″N 77°02′28″W	Golden Triangle	
12	Arlington Memorial Bridge	Arlington Memorial Bridge	April 4, 1980 (#80000346)	Spans the Potomac River; 38°53′12″N 77°03′39″W	Monumental Core	Extends into Arlington County, Virginia
13	Arts and Industries Building	Arts and Industries Building	November 11, 1971 (#71000994)	900 Jefferson Dr., SW. 38°53′13″N 77°01′29″W	Southwest Federal Center	
14	Arts Club of Washington	Arts Club of Washington	March 24, 1969 (#69000289)	2017 I St., NW. 38°54′05″N 77°02′46″W	Golden Triangle	Cleveland Abbe, a meteorologist who became known as the father of the National Weather Service, lived in this house from 1877 to 1909. Previous occupants in the early decades of the 19th century included James Monroe and the British legation. Built ca. 1802 to 1805, this is a fine example of the Federal style of residential architecture.
15	Asbury United Methodist Church	Asbury United Methodist Church	November 1, 1986 (#86003029)	Eleventh and K Sts. NW; 38°54′08″N 77°01′39″W	Downtown	
16	Ashburton House	Ashburton House	November 7, 1973 (#73002071)	1525 H St., NW. 38°54′01″N 77°02′09″W	Golden Triangle	
17	Auditor's Building Complex	Auditor's Building Complex	April 27, 1978 (#78003051)	14th St. and Independence Ave. 38°53′10″N 77°02′01″W	Southwest Federal Center	
18	Augusta Apartment Building	Augusta Apartment Building	September 9, 1994 (#94001032)	1151 New Jersey Ave. (216 New York Ave.), NW. 38°54′19″N 77°00′52″W	North Capitol Street	
19	Bachelor Apartment House	Bachelor Apartment House	December 8, 1978 (#78003052)	1737 H St., NW. 38°54′01″N 77°02′30″W	Golden Triangle	
20	Barr Building	Barr Building	January 14, 2013 (#12001165)	910 17th St., NW; 38°54′07″N 77°02′24″W	Golden Triangle	
21	Blair House	Blair House	October 15, 1966 (#66000963)	1651 Pennsylvania Ave., NW; 38°53′56″N 77°02′19″W	Monumental Core	
22	Bond Building	Bond Building	September 15, 1983 (#83001415)	1404 New York Ave., NW; 38°53′56″N 77°01′57″W	Downtown	
23	Brownley Confectionery Building	Brownley Confectionery Building	December 1, 1994 (#94001408)	1309 F St., NW. 38°53′51″N 77°01′50″W	Downtown	
24	Buildings at 1000 Block of Seventh Street, and 649–651 New York Avenue NW	Buildings at 1000 Block of Seventh Street, and 649–651 New York Avenue NW	February 2, 1984 (#84000861)	1005–1035 7th St., and 649–651 New York Ave. NW; 38°54′12″N 77°01′19″W	Mount Vernon Square	649 New York Avenue, NW
25	Bulletin Building	Bulletin Building	November 12, 2008 (#07000422)	717 6th St., NW; 38°53′56″N 77°01′11″W	Chinatown	
26	Capitol Hill Historic District	Capitol Hill Historic District	August 27, 1976 (#76002127)	Roughly bounded by Virginia Ave., SE., S. Capitol St., F St., NE., and 14th Sts., SE. and NE.; also roughly bounded by 7th St., NE., Interstate 295, M St., SE., and 11th St., SE.; also squares 752, 753, 777, and 788 bounded by 2nd, 4th, and F Sts., NE. 38°53′13″N 76°59′51″W	NE, SE and NW	Second and third locations represent boundary increases of July 3, 2003 and October 21, 2015
27	Carlton Hotel	Carlton Hotel	June 28, 1990 (#90000911)	923 16th St., NW. 38°54′07″N 77°02′11″W	Golden Triangle	
28	Carnegie Endowment for International Peace	Carnegie Endowment for International Peace	September 13, 1974 (#74002156)	700 Jackson Pl., NW; 38°53′56″N 77°02′19″W	Monumental Core	
29	Central National Bank	Central National Bank	April 27, 1995 (#95000526)	633 Pennsylvania Ave., NW. 38°53′36″N 77°01′16″W	Penn Quarter	
30	Central Heating Plant	Central Heating Plant	July 6, 2007 (#07000637)	325 13th St., SW. 38°53′08″N 77°01′44″W	Southwest Federal Center	
31	Central Public Library	Central Public Library	December 3, 1969 (#69000290)	Mount Vernon Sq., 8th and K Sts., NW. 38°54′08″N 77°01′24″W	Mount Vernon Square	
32	Champlain Apartment Building	Champlain Apartment Building	September 7, 1994 (#94001042)	1424 K St., NW. 38°54′09″N 77°01′58″W	Downtown	
33	Chase's Theater and Riggs Building	Chase's Theater and Riggs Building	September 7, 1978 (#78003053)	1426 G St. NW. and 615-627 15th St. NW. 38°53′53″N 77°02′01″W	Downtown	
34	Chesapeake and Potomac Telephone Company Building	Chesapeake and Potomac Telephone Company Building	August 5, 1988 (#88001112)	730 Twelfth St., NW; 38°53′56″N 77°01′42″W	Downtown	
35	Chesapeake and Potomac Telephone Company, Old Main Building	Chesapeake and Potomac Telephone Company, Old Main Building	June 13, 1988 (#88000652)	722 Twelfth St., NW; 38°53′56″N 77°01′42″W	Downtown	
36	Church of the Ascension	Church of the Ascension	January 19, 1984 (#84000863)	1215 Massachusetts Ave. NW; 38°54′18″N 77°01′43″W	Mount Vernon Square	
37	Church of the Epiphany	Church of the Epiphany	September 10, 1971 (#71000996)	1317 G St., NW. 38°53′55″N 77°01′51″W	Downtown	
38	Civil War Fort Sites	Civil War Fort Sites	July 15, 1974 (#74000274)	Arc of sites surrounding central Washington in Maryland, Virginia, and D.C. 38°49′33″N 77°00′56″W	All quadrants	At the outset of the Civil War in 1861, Washington became a critical target for rebel attacks but was virtually without protection. The Union Army hastily began construction of a fortified defense line around the city, the physical remnants of which encompass these 19 earthwork forts, including Fort Greble. See also National Register listings in western NW D.C., upper NW D.C., NE D.C., SE D.C., Prince George's County, Maryland, and Fairfax County, Virginia.
39	Civil War Monuments in Washington, DC	Civil War Monuments in Washington, DC	September 20, 1978 (#78000257)	Various parks within the original boundaries of city 38°54′20″N 77°01′57″W	Various	18 statues about people and topics related to the Civil War, including 11 in central Washington, 6 in the NW quadrant, and 1 in the NE quadrant.
40	Commercial National Bank	Commercial National Bank	October 11, 1991 (#91001488)	1405 G St., NW. 38°53′54″N 77°01′57″W	Downtown	
41	Concordia German Evangelical Church and Rectory	Concordia German Evangelical Church and Rectory	December 14, 1978 (#78003055)	20th and G Sts., NW. 38°53′52″N 77°02′42″W	George Washington University	Sits directly north of the President's House of George Washington University, also sits right across the street from Oscar W. Underwood House that serves as part of the George Washington University Law School.
42	Constitution Hall	Constitution Hall	September 16, 1985 (#85002724)	311 Eighteenth St., NW. 38°53′35″N 77°02′30″W	Monumental Core	
43	Corcoran Gallery of Art	Corcoran Gallery of Art	May 6, 1971 (#71000997)	17th St. at New York Ave., NW. 38°53′44″N 77°02′26″W	George Washington University	Home to the Corcoran School of the Arts and Design at George Washington University.
44	Corcoran Hall	Corcoran Hall	April 12, 1991 (#90001545)	721 21st St., NW. 38°53′57″N 77°02′48″W	George Washington University	Currently houses faculty offices for the George Washington University physics department
45	Cuban Friendship Urn	Cuban Friendship Urn	October 11, 2007 (#07001053)	Reservation 332, Ohio Dr., at 14th St. Bridge, SW. 38°52′43″N 77°02′18″W	Southwest Waterfront	
46	Davidson Building	Davidson Building	October 4, 2016 (#16000683)	927 15th St., NW. 38°54′08″N 77°02′00″W	Downtown	
47	Decatur House	Decatur House	October 15, 1966 (#66000858)	748 Jackson Pl., NW. 38°53′59″N 77°02′20″W	Monumental Core	Federal Style house designed by Benjamin Henry Latrobe for naval hero Stephen Decatur across Lafayette Square from the White House. During 1827-1833 was home to successive Secretaries of State Henry Clay, Martin Van Buren, and Judah P. Benjamin.
48	Denrike Building	Denrike Building	August 22, 2016 (#16000542)	1010 Vermont Ave., NW; 38°54′10″N 77°02′01″W	Downtown	
49	James C. Dent House	James C. Dent House	November 2, 2010 (#10000880)	156 Q St., SW. 38°52′14″N 77°00′48″W	Buzzard Point	
50	District Building	District Building	March 16, 1972 (#72001422)	SE corner of 14th and E Sts., NW. 38°53′41″N 77°01′54″W	Monumental Core	
51	District of Columbia City Hall	District of Columbia City Hall	October 15, 1966 (#66000857)	4th and E Sts., NW; 38°53′43″N 77°01′04″W	Judiciary Square	
52	District of Columbia Municipal Center and Plaza	District of Columbia Municipal Center and Plaza	July 19, 2019 (#100004189)	300 Indiana Ave. NW (301 C St. NW); 38°53′38″N 77°01′03″W	Judiciary Square	
53	District of Columbia Pound	District of Columbia Pound	September 30, 2014 (#14000798)	820 S. Capitol St., SW., and 9 I St., SW. 38°52′46″N 77°00′34″W	Southwest Waterfront	
54	District of Columbia Recorder of Deeds	District of Columbia Recorder of Deeds	April 14, 2020 (#100005181)	515 D St. NW; 38°53′41″N 77°01′11″W	Judiciary Square	
55	District of Columbia War Memorial	District of Columbia War Memorial	July 11, 2014 (#14000388)	Independence Ave. between 17th and 23rd Sts., SW. 38°53′15″N 77°02′37″W	Monumental Core	
56	Downtown Historic District	Downtown Historic District	September 22, 2001 (#84003901)	Roughly, Seventh St. from Pennsylvania Ave. to Mt. Vernon Sq., and F St. between Eleventh and Seventh Sts., NW; 38°53′50″N 77°01′29″W	Downtown	
57	Duncanson-Cranch House	Duncanson-Cranch House	July 26, 1973 (#73002081)	468-470 N St., SW. 38°52′29″N 77°01′06″W	Southwest Waterfront	
58	John J. Earley Office and Studio	John J. Earley Office and Studio	June 18, 2010 (#10000367)	2131 G St., NW; 38°53′55″N 77°02′53″W	George Washington University	Part of George Washington University's Columbian College of Arts and Sciences. Currently houses studios for the Theatre and Dance Department.
59	East and West Potomac Parks	East and West Potomac Parks	November 30, 1973 (#73000217)	Bounded by Constitution Ave., 17th St., Independence Ave., Washington Channel, Potomac River, and Rock Creek Park; 38°52′42″N 77°02′08″W	NW and SW	East Potomac Park and West Potomac Park
60	The Editors Building	The Editors Building	March 17, 2015 (#15000072)	1729 H St., NW; 38°54′01″N 77°02′28″W	Downtown	
61	Eight Hundred Block of F St. NW	Eight Hundred Block of F St. NW	April 2, 1974 (#74002159)	800-818 F St. and 527 9th St., NW. 38°53′49″N 77°01′26″W	Penn Quarter	
62	Engine Company 16-Truck Company 3	Engine Company 16-Truck Company 3	May 18, 2011 (#11000281)	1018 13th St., NW; 38°54′12″N 77°01′47″W	Downtown	
63	Engine Company 23	Engine Company 23	June 6, 2007 (#07000540)	2119 G St., NW; 38°53′55″N 77°02′52″W	George Washington University	
64	Equitable Co-operative Building Association	Equitable Co-operative Building Association	December 29, 1994 (#94001515)	915 F St., NW. 38°53′50″N 77°01′29″W	Chinatown	
65	The Ethelhurst	The Ethelhurst	June 26, 2019 (#100004123)	1025 Fifteenth St., NW; 38°54′13″N 77°02′04″W		
66	The Everglades	The Everglades	June 18, 2010 (#10000368)	2223 H St., NW; 38°53′59″N 77°02′59″W	George Washington University	Currently Fulbright Hall (residence hall) of George Washington University.
67	Executive Office Building	Executive Office Building	June 4, 1969 (#69000293)	Pennsylvania Ave. and 17th St., NW; 38°53′51″N 77°02′21″W	Monumental Core	
68	Federal Home Loan Bank Board Building	Federal Home Loan Bank Board Building	July 3, 2007 (#07000642)	320 1st St., NW. 38°53′40″N 77°00′45″W	Downtown East	
69	Federal-American National Bank	Federal-American National Bank	December 29, 1994 (#94001517)	615-621 14th St., NW. 38°53′52″N 77°01′54″W	Downtown	
70	Federal Home Loan Bank Board Building (FHLBB)	Federal Home Loan Bank Board Building (FHLBB)	October 11, 2016 (#16000701)	1700 G St., NW; 38°53′53″N 77°02′24″W	Monumental Core	
71	Federal Office Building No. 6	Federal Office Building No. 6	May 8, 2017 (#100000956)	400 Maryland Ave., SW. 38°53′12″N 77°01′08″W	Southwest Federal Center	
72	Federal Office Buildings 10A and 10B	Federal Office Buildings 10A and 10B	October 11, 2024 (#100010903)	600 and 800 Independence Avenue SW; 38°53′13″N 77°01′22″W	Southwest Federal Center	The Wilbur Wright and Orville Wright Federal Buildings, housing the FAA headquarters.
73	Financial Historic District	Financial Historic District	October 12, 2006 (#84003900)	15th St. from Pennsylvania Ave. to I St., NW.; also K, 14th, and G Sts., NW. 38°53′55″N 77°02′02″W	Monumental Core, Downtown	Previously known as the Fifteenth Street Financial Historic District. Second set of addresses represents a boundary increase of January 12, 2017
74	The Flagler	The Flagler	June 18, 2010 (#10000369)	736 22nd St., NW; 38°53′58″N 77°02′57″W	George Washington University	
75	Fletcher Chapel	Fletcher Chapel	August 14, 1997 (#97000834)	401 New York Ave., NW; 38°54′18″N 77°00′59″W	Mount Vernon Square	
76	Foggy Bottom Historic District	Foggy Bottom Historic District	October 14, 1987 (#87001269)	Bounded by New Hampshire Ave., Twenty-fourth, Twenty-sixth, H, and K Sts., NW; 38°54′02″N 77°03′12″W	Foggy Bottom	
77	Ford's Theatre National Historic Site	Ford's Theatre National Historic Site	October 15, 1966 (#66000034)	10th St., NW., between E and F Sts. 38°53′47″N 77°01′34″W	Penn Quarter	
78	Franklin School	Franklin School	April 11, 1973 (#73002085)	13th and K Sts., NW. 38°54′08″N 77°01′47″W	Downtown	A nineteenth-century school, site of Alexander Graham Bell's experiments with the photophone.
79	Freer Gallery of Art	Freer Gallery of Art	June 23, 1969 (#69000295)	12th St. and Jefferson Dr., SW. 38°53′17″N 77°01′40″W	Southwest Federal Center	
80	Friendship Baptist Church	Friendship Baptist Church	November 19, 2004 (#04001236)	734 1st St., SW. 38°52′49″N 77°00′43″W	Southwest Waterfront	
81	Garfinckel's Department Store	Garfinckel's Department Store	April 4, 1995 (#95000353)	1401 F St., NW. 38°53′51″N 77°01′56″W	Downtown	
82	General Post Office	General Post Office	March 24, 1969 (#69000311)	E and F Sts. between 7th and 8th Sts., NW; 38°53′48″N 77°01′22″W	Penn Quarter	
83	Germuiller Row	Germuiller Row	December 1, 1994 (#94001406)	748 3rd St. and 300-302 H St., NW. 38°53′59″N 77°00′56″W	Chinatown	
84	Godey Lime Kilns	Godey Lime Kilns	November 2, 1973 (#73000221)	Rock Creek and Potomac Parkway at 27th and L Sts., NW. 38°54′12″N 77°03′22″W	West End	
85	Samuel Gompers Memorial	Samuel Gompers Memorial	October 11, 2007 (#07001054)	Massachusetts Ave. and 10th and L Sts., NW., Reservation 69; 38°54′21″N 77°01′36″W	Mount Vernon Square	
86	Ulysses S. Grant School	Ulysses S. Grant School	May 22, 2007 (#07000447)	2130 G St. NW; 38°53′59″N 77°02′53″W	George Washington University	
87	Hamilton Hotel	Hamilton Hotel	April 17, 2013 (#12001194)	1001 14th St. NW; 38°54′10″N 77°01′53″W	Downtown	
88	Harbour Square	Harbour Square	November 28, 2018 (#100003158)	400-560 (even) N St., SW., and 1301-1327 (odd) 4th St., SW. 38°52′26″N 77°01′04″W	Southwest Waterfront	
89	Harris & Ewing Photographic Studio	Harris & Ewing Photographic Studio	December 16, 1994 (#94001407)	1311-1313 F St., NW. 38°53′51″N 77°01′51″W	Downtown	
90	Harrison Apartment Building	Harrison Apartment Building	September 7, 1994 (#94001036)	704 3rd St., NW. 38°53′55″N 77°00′56″W	Chinatown	
91	W. B. Hibbs and Company Building	W. B. Hibbs and Company Building	March 19, 1991 (#90002150)	725 Fifteenth St., NW. 38°53′57″N 77°02′00″W	Downtown	
92	Hill Building	Hill Building	March 17, 2015 (#15000073)	839 17th or 1636 I Sts., NW. 38°54′04″N 77°02′22″W	Downtown	
93	Hotel Washington	Hotel Washington	March 30, 1995 (#95000352)	515 15th St., NW. 38°53′49″N 77°02′01″W	Downtown	
94	Hubert H. Humphrey Building	Hubert H. Humphrey Building	September 12, 2024 (#100010786)	200 Independence Avenue, SW; 38°53′14″N 77°00′52″W		Brutalist design by Marcel Breuer.
95	Interior Department Offices	Interior Department Offices	November 23, 1986 (#86003160)	Eighteenth and F Sts. NW; 38°53′48″N 77°02′35″W	Golden Triangle	
96	Jefferson Apartment Building	Jefferson Apartment Building	September 7, 1994 (#94001046)	315 H St., NW. 38°54′01″N 77°00′57″W	Mount Vernon Triangle	
97	Thomas Jefferson Memorial	Thomas Jefferson Memorial	October 15, 1966 (#66000029)	S bank of the Tidal Basin; 38°52′52″N 77°02′13″W	Monumental Core	
98	Lyndon Baines Johnson Memorial Grove On The Potomac	Lyndon Baines Johnson Memorial Grove On The Potomac	December 28, 1973 (#73002097)	Lady Byrd Johnson Park, Columbia Island; 38°52′42″N 77°03′05″W	Monumental Core	
99	The Keystone	The Keystone	June 18, 2010 (#10000370)	2150 Pennsylvania Ave., NW; 38°54′06″N 77°02′54″W	George Washington University	Currently the H.B. Burns Memorial Building of George Washington University.
100	Martin Luther King Memorial Library	Martin Luther King Memorial Library	October 22, 2007 (#07001102)	901 G St. NW. 38°54′02″N 77°01′29″W	Chinatown	
101	Korean War Veterans Memorial	Korean War Veterans Memorial	July 27, 1995 (#01000273)	Southeast of the Lincoln Memorial, off Independence Ave. 38°53′16″N 77°02′50″W	Monumental Core	
102	Lafayette Building	Lafayette Building	September 1, 2005 (#05001205)	811 Vermont Ave. NW; 38°54′03″N 77°02′05″W	Golden Triangle	
103	Lafayette Square Historic District	Lafayette Square Historic District	August 29, 1970 (#70000833)	Roughly between 15th and 17th Sts. and H St. and State and Treasury Places, exclusive of the White House and its grounds 38°53′55″N 77°02′11″W	Monumental Core, Golden Triangle, Downtown	
104	Julius Lansburgh Furniture Co., Inc.	Julius Lansburgh Furniture Co., Inc.	May 8, 1974 (#74002164)	909 F St., NW. 38°53′51″N 77°01′29″W	Chinatown	Also known as the Old Masonic Temple
105	Thomas Law House	Thomas Law House	August 14, 1973 (#73002093)	1252 6th St., SW. 38°52′29″N 77°01′09″W	Southwest Waterfront	
106	L'Enfant Plan of the City of Washington, District of Columbia	L'Enfant Plan of the City of Washington, District of Columbia	April 24, 1997 (#97000332)	Roughly bounded by Florida Ave. from Rock Cr., NW. to 15th St., NE., S to C St., and E to the Anacostia River; 38°53′26″N 77°01′13″W	All	
107	Lenthall Houses	Lenthall Houses	March 16, 1972 (#72001425)	606–610 21St., NW; 38°53′52″N 77°02′49″W	George Washington University	Two of the oldest known houses built in the District of Columbia. Currently a part of George Washington University.
108	Edward Simon Lewis House	Edward Simon Lewis House	July 23, 1973 (#73002094)	456 N St., SW. 38°52′28″N 77°01′05″W	Southwest Waterfront	
109	Lincoln Memorial	Lincoln Memorial	October 15, 1966 (#66000030)	West Potomac Park; 38°53′21″N 77°03′00″W	Monumental Core	
110	Lisner Auditorium	Lisner Auditorium	October 25, 1990 (#90001548)	730 21st St., NW. 38°53′57″N 77°02′50″W	George Washington University	Contains multiple auditoriums used by George Washington University.
111	Lockkeeper's House, C & O Canal Extension	Lockkeeper's House, C & O Canal Extension	November 30, 1973 (#73000218)	SW corner of 17th St. and Constitution Ave., NW. 38°53′31″N 77°02′24″W	Monumental Core	
112	Luzon Apartment Building	Luzon Apartment Building	September 7, 1994 (#94001035)	2501 Pennsylvania Ave., NW. 38°54′14″N 77°03′12″W	West End	
113	M Street High School	M Street High School	October 23, 1986 (#86002924)	128 M St. NW; 38°54′19″N 77°00′49″W	North Capitol Street	
114	Gen. Robert Macfeely House	Gen. Robert Macfeely House	September 15, 1989 (#89001214)	2015 I St., NW. 38°54′06″N 77°02′44″W	Golden Triangle	
115	Masonic Temple	Masonic Temple	February 18, 1987 (#86002920)	801 Thirteenth St., NW; 38°54′00″N 77°01′46″W	Downtown	
116	Mayflower Hotel	Mayflower Hotel	November 14, 1983 (#83003527)	1127 Connecticut Ave. NW; 38°54′16″N 77°02′23″W	Golden Triangle	
117	McLachlen Building	McLachlen Building	November 6, 1986 (#86003042)	1001 G St. NW; 38°53′54″N 77°01′35″W	Downtown	
118	Memorial Continental Hall	Memorial Continental Hall	November 28, 1972 (#72001427)	17th St., between C and D Sts., NW; 38°53′37″N 77°02′25″W	Monumental Core	
119	Metropolitan African Methodist Episcopal Church	Metropolitan African Methodist Episcopal Church	July 26, 1973 (#73002102)	1518 M St., NW. 38°54′19″N 77°02′09″W	Golden Triangle	Gothic-style church dedicated in 1886; held the funerals of Frederick Douglass and Rosa Parks; on the National Trust for Historic Preservation 2010 list of America's Most Endangered Places
120	Metropolitan Club	Metropolitan Club	April 28, 1995 (#95000441)	1700 H St., NW. 38°54′00″N 77°02′24″W	Golden Triangle	
121	Milton Hall	Milton Hall	June 18, 2010 (#10000371)	2222 I St., NW; 38°54′02″N 77°02′59″W	George Washington University	Currently is Jacqueline Bouvier Kennedy Onassis Hall at George Washington University.
122	Moran Building	Moran Building	September 26, 1983 (#83001413)	501-509 G St., NW; 38°53′54″N 77°01′10″W	Chinatown	
123	Morrison and Clark Houses	Morrison and Clark Houses	March 19, 1991 (#90002149)	1013-1015 L St., NW. 38°54′15″N 77°01′38″W	Mount Vernon Square	
124	Mount Vernon Memorial Highway	Mount Vernon Memorial Highway	May 18, 1981 (#81000079)	Washington St. and George Washington Memorial Parkway; 38°52′38″N 77°02′56″W	SW	Extends into Alexandria, Virginia
125	Mount Vernon Square Historic District	Mount Vernon Square Historic District	September 3, 1999 (#99001071)	Roughly bounded by New York Ave., 7th St., N St., and 1st St., NW. 38°54′19″N 77°01′04″W	Mount Vernon Square	Extends north of M Street
126	Mount Vernon Triangle Historic District	Mount Vernon Triangle Historic District	September 19, 2006 (#06000191)	Roughly bounded by the 400 blocks of Massachusetts Ave., NW. and K St., NW., Prather's Alley, and 5th St., NW. 38°54′13″N 77°01′06″W	Mount Vernon Triangle	
127	Mullett Rowhouses	Mullett Rowhouses	September 30, 1994 (#94001149)	2517, 2519 and 2525 Pennsylvania Ave., NW. 38°54′15″N 77°03′16″W	West End	
128	Munson Hall	Munson Hall	June 18, 2010 (#10000372)	2212 H St., NW; 38°54′02″N 77°02′58″W	George Washington University	Currently Munson Hall of George Washington University.
129	Myrene Apartment Building	Myrene Apartment Building	September 9, 1994 (#94001041)	703 6th St., NW. 38°53′55″N 77°01′11″W	Chinatown	
130	National Academy of Sciences	National Academy of Sciences	March 15, 1974 (#74002168)	2101 Constitution Ave., NW. 38°53′34″N 77°02′54″W	Monumental Core	
131	National Archives	National Archives	May 27, 1971 (#71001004)	Constitution Ave. between 7th and 9th Sts., NW. 38°53′33″N 77°01′24″W	Monumental Core	Designated a National Historic Landmark in 2023.
132	National Bank of Washington, Washington Branch	National Bank of Washington, Washington Branch	May 8, 1974 (#74002169)	301 7th St., NW. 38°53′37″N 77°01′16″W	Penn Quarter	
133	National Geographic Society Headquarters	National Geographic Society Headquarters	June 5, 2023 (#100009025)	1156 16th St., NW and 1145 17th St. NW; 38°54′20″N 77°02′12″W	NW	
134	National Mall	National Mall	October 15, 1966 (#66000031)	Between Independence and Constitution Aves. from the U.S. Capitol to the Washington Monument; also bounded by 3rd St., NW.-SW., Independence Ave., SW., Raoul Wallenberg Pl., SW., the CSX rail line, the Potomac River, and Constitution Ave., NW. 38°53′23″N 77°01′20″W	NW and SW	Second set of addresses represents a boundary increase of December 8, 2016
135	National Metropolitan Bank Building	National Metropolitan Bank Building	September 13, 1978 (#78003059)	613 15th St., NW. 38°53′52″N 77°02′01″W	Downtown	
136	National Museum of Natural History	National Museum of Natural History	March 30, 2023 (#100008754)	10th St. and Constitution Ave. NW; 38°53′29″N 77°01′33″W	Monumental Core	
137	National Portrait Gallery	National Portrait Gallery	October 15, 1966 (#66000902)	F and G Sts. between 7th and 9th Sts., NW; 38°53′52″N 77°01′23″W	Chinatown	
138	National Savings and Trust Company	National Savings and Trust Company	March 16, 1972 (#72001428)	New York Ave. and 15th St., NW. 38°53′57″N 77°02′01″W	Downtown	
139	National Union Building	National Union Building	September 21, 1990 (#90001375)	918 F St., NW; 38°53′49″N 77°01′29″W	Penn Quarter	
140	National War College	National War College	November 28, 1972 (#72001535)	P St., within Fort Lesley J. McNair; 38°51′47″N 77°01′01″W	Buzzard Point	
141	Observatory Hill	Observatory Hill	January 12, 2017 (#100000479)	23rd and E Streets, Northwest; 38°53′41″N 77°03′06″W	Monumental Core	
142	The Octagon	The Octagon	October 15, 1966 (#66000863)	1799 New York Ave., NW; 38°53′46″N 77°02′30″W	Golden Triangle	NHL: Served as the temporary Executive Mansion for Pres. James Madison after White House was burned by the British in the War of 1812
143	Old Engine Company No. 6	Old Engine Company No. 6	September 5, 1975 (#75002052)	438 Massachusetts Ave., NW. 38°54′01″N 77°01′03″W	Chinatown	
144	Old Naval Observatory	Old Naval Observatory	October 15, 1966 (#66000864)	23rd and E Sts., NW; 38°53′42″N 77°03′07″W	Monumental Core	
145	Old Post Office and Clock Tower	Old Post Office and Clock Tower	April 11, 1973 (#73002105)	Pennsylvania Ave. at 12th St., NW. 38°53′38″N 77°01′41″W	Monumental Core	
146	On Leong Chinese Merchants Association	On Leong Chinese Merchants Association	June 21, 2024 (#100010440)	618-620 H Street NW; 38°53′59″N 77°01′16″W	Chinatown	
147	Oriental Building Association No. 6 Building	Oriental Building Association No. 6 Building	September 10, 2004 (#04000956)	600 F St. NW; 38°53′56″N 77°01′13″W	Penn Quarter	
148	Pan American Union	Pan American Union	June 4, 1969 (#69000298)	17th St. between C St. and Constitution Ave., NW. 38°53′34″N 77°02′27″W	Monumental Core	
149	Pennsylvania Avenue National Historic Site	Pennsylvania Avenue National Historic Site	October 15, 1966 (#66000865)	Roughly bounded by Constitution Ave., F St., 3rd, and 15th Sts. NW; 38°53′35″N 77°01′35″W	Monumental Core, Downtown East, Downtown, Penn Quarter	
150	Pension Building	Pension Building	March 24, 1969 (#69000312)	4th and 5th Sts. between F and G Sts., NW; 38°53′51″N 77°01′05″W	Chinatown	Now the National Building Museum
151	Peyser Building-Security Savings and Commercial Bank	Peyser Building-Security Savings and Commercial Bank	September 10, 2012 (#12000777)	1518 K St., NW; 38°54′08″N 77°02′08″W	Golden Triangle	
152	PHILADELPHIA (gundelo)	PHILADELPHIA (gundelo)	October 15, 1966 (#66000852)	National Museum of American History, 14th St. and Constitution Ave., NW; 38°53′29″N 77°01′48″W	Monumental Core	Only surviving American gunboat from the Revolutionary War, fought in Battle of Valcour Island
153	President's Office, George Washington University	President's Office, George Washington University	September 13, 1991 (#90001544)	2003 G St., NW. and 700 20th St., NW. 38°53′54″N 77°02′43″W	George Washington University	Part of the George Washington University School of Law. Sits on the historic University Yard with Stockton Hall and Corcoran Hall.
154	President's Park South	President's Park South	May 6, 1980 (#80000347)	Constitution Ave. 38°53′39″N 77°02′13″W	Mounmental Core	
155	Railroad Retirement Board Building	Railroad Retirement Board Building	July 6, 2007 (#07000638)	330 C St., SW. 38°53′08″N 77°01′00″W	Southwest Federal Center	
156	Randall Junior High School	Randall Junior High School	December 22, 2008 (#08001205)	65 I St., SW. 38°52′45″N 77°00′39″W	Southwest Waterfront	
157	Real Estate Trust Building-Continental Trust Building	Real Estate Trust Building-Continental Trust Building	January 20, 2015 (#14001166)	1343 H St., NW; 38°54′01″N 77°01′52″W	Downtown	
158	Renwick Gallery	Renwick Gallery	March 24, 1969 (#69000300)	Northeast corner of 17th St. and Pennsylvania Ave., NW; 38°53′56″N 77°02′22″W	Monumental Core	
159	Rhodes' Tavern	Rhodes' Tavern	March 24, 1969 (#69000301)	601-603 15th St. and 1431 F St., NW. 38°53′51″N 77°02′01″W	Downtown	
160	Riggs National Bank	Riggs National Bank	July 16, 1973 (#73002113)	1503-1505 Pennsylvania Ave., NW. 38°53′56″N 77°02′04″W	Golden Triangle	
161	Riggs National Bank, Washington Loan and Trust Company Branch	Riggs National Bank, Washington Loan and Trust Company Branch	May 6, 1971 (#71001005)	SW corner of 9th and F Sts., NW. 38°53′50″N 77°01′29″W	Penn Quarter	
162	Ringgold-Carroll House	Ringgold-Carroll House	July 26, 1973 (#73002114)	1801 F St., NW. 38°53′51″N 77°02′33″W	Golden Triangle	
163	Franklin Delano Roosevelt Memorial	Franklin Delano Roosevelt Memorial	May 2, 1997 (#01000271)	Cherry Tree Walk, Tidal Basin; 38°53′35″N 77°01′26″W	Monumental Core	
164	St. Aloysius Catholic Church	St. Aloysius Catholic Church	July 26, 1973 (#73002116)	N. Capitol and I Sts., NW. 38°54′05″N 77°00′36″W	North Capitol Street	
165	Saint James Mutual Homes	Saint James Mutual Homes	February 23, 2016 (#16000027)	201-217 P, 1410-1414 3rd, and 220-215-229 O Sts., SW., and 1411-1415 James Creek Parkway, SW. 38°52′21″N 77°00′49″W	Southwest Waterfront	
166	St. John's Church	St. John's Church	October 15, 1966 (#66000868)	16th and H Sts., NW; 38°54′01″N 77°02′11″W	Golden Triangle	
167	St. Mary's Episcopal Church	St. Mary's Episcopal Church	April 2, 1973 (#73002118)	730 23rd St., NW. 38°53′57″N 77°03′02″W	George Washington University	
168	General Jose de San Martin Memorial	General Jose de San Martin Memorial	October 12, 2007 (#07001059)	Reservation 106, Virginia Ave. and 20th St., NW. 38°53′48″N 77°02′44″W	Monumental Core	
169	B.F. Saul Building	B.F. Saul Building	October 4, 2016 (#16000685)	925 15th St., NW. 38°54′07″N 77°02′00″W	Downtown	
170	Schneider Triangle	Schneider Triangle	December 13, 1982 (#82001031)	Bounded by Washington Circle, New Hampshire Ave. NW, K, 22nd, and L Sts. NW; 38°54′11″N 77°02′58″W	George Washington University	
171	Second National Bank	Second National Bank	December 29, 1994 (#94001516)	1331 G St., NW. 38°53′54″N 77°01′52″W	Downtown	
172	Smithsonian Building	Smithsonian Building	October 15, 1966 (#66000867)	Jefferson Dr. at 10th St., SW. 38°53′19″N 77°01′35″W	Southwest Federal Center	
173	Social Security Administration Building	Social Security Administration Building	July 6, 2007 (#07000639)	330 Independence Ave., SW. 38°52′55″N 77°01′01″W	Southwest Federal Center	
174	Southeast No. 9 Boundary Marker of the Original District of Columbia	Southeast No. 9 Boundary Marker of the Original District of Columbia	November 1, 1996 (#96001242)	0.225 mile south of the Oxon Cove Bridge and 420 feet east of Shepherd Parkway; 38°48′14″N 77°01′27″W	SW	
175	Southern Railway Building	Southern Railway Building	April 26, 2016 (#16000194)	1500 K St., NW; 38°54′08″N 77°02′06″W	Downtown	
176	Steedman-Ray House	Steedman-Ray House	September 21, 1990 (#90001376)	1925 F St., NW; 38°53′50″N 77°02′42″W	George Washington University	This houses the President of George Washington University. Previously, it has been used as an alumni space on the campus.
177	Thaddeus Stevens School	Thaddeus Stevens School	July 12, 2001 (#01000706)	1050 Twenty-First St., NW; 38°54′11″N 77°02′49″W	Golden Triangle	
178	Stockton Hall	Stockton Hall	September 13, 1991 (#90001546)	720 20th St., NW. 38°53′57″N 77°02′43″W	George Washington University	Currently part of the George Washington University School of Law. Sits on historic University Yard with Maxwell Woodhull House, President's Office, George Washington University, and Corcoran Hall.
179	Hattie M. Strong Residence Hall	Hattie M. Strong Residence Hall	April 12, 1991 (#90001547)	620 21st St., NW. 38°53′52″N 77°02′50″W	George Washington University	Named after a donation for the construction from Hattie Strong, Hattie M. Strong Residence Hall is a women's residence hall at George Washington University.
180	Sun Building	Sun Building	March 27, 1985 (#85000650)	1317 F St., NW; 38°53′48″N 77°01′34″W	Downtown	
181	Mary E. Surratt House	Mary E. Surratt House	August 11, 2009 (#04000118)	604 H Street; 38°53′58″N 77°01′13″W	Chinatown	
182	William Syphax School	William Syphax School	July 25, 2003 (#03000672)	1360 Half St., SW. 38°52′33″N 77°00′31″W	Southwest Waterfront	
183	Benjamin Ogle Tayloe House	Benjamin Ogle Tayloe House	November 2, 2023 (#100009491)	723 Madison Place NW (formerly 21 Madison Place NW); 38°53′59″N 77°02′06″W	Lafayette Square	
184	Temperance Fountain	Temperance Fountain	October 12, 2007 (#07001061)	7th St. and Indiana Ave., NW. 38°53′37″N 77°01′19″W	Penn Quarter	
185	Terminal Refrigerating and Warehouse Company	Terminal Refrigerating and Warehouse Company	October 15, 2014 (#14000854)	300 D St., SW. 38°53′04″N 77°00′59″W	Southwest Federal Center	
186	Tiber Island	Tiber Island	January 14, 2013 (#12001166)	401-461 N, 430-490 M, 1201-1265 4th, and 1252 6th Sts., SW. 38°52′32″N 77°01′07″W	Southwest Waterfront	
187	Titanic Memorial	Titanic Memorial	October 12, 2007 (#07001060)	Reservation 717, Waterfront Park, and Water and P Sts., SW. 38°52′38″N 77°01′16″W	Southwest Waterfront	
188	Tower Building	Tower Building	September 7, 1995 (#95001084)	1401 K St., NW. 38°54′05″N 77°01′57″W	Downtown	
189	Town Center East	Town Center East	January 15, 2014 (#13001071)	1001 and 1101 3rd St., SW. 38°52′39″N 77°00′57″W	Southwest Waterfront	
190	Oscar W. Underwood House	Oscar W. Underwood House	December 8, 1976 (#76002132)	2000 G St., NW; 38°53′53″N 77°02′43″W	George Washington University	This is the home of the Jacob Burns Law Clinics of the George Washington University Law School.
191	Union Trust Building	Union Trust Building	January 19, 1984 (#84000867)	740 15th St. NW; 38°54′00″N 77°02′02″W	Golden Triangle	
192	United Brotherhood of Carpenters and Joiners-Local 132	United Brotherhood of Carpenters and Joiners-Local 132	September 17, 2003 (#03000945)	1010 10th St. NW, 1001 K St. NW; 38°54′09″N 77°01′35″W	Downtown	
193	United Mine Workers of America Building	United Mine Workers of America Building	September 13, 2000 (#00001032)	900 Fifteenth St. NW; 38°54′08″N 77°02′13″W	Golden Triangle	
194	U.S. Capitol Gatehouses and Gateposts	U.S. Capitol Gatehouses and Gateposts	November 30, 1973 (#73002120)	7th, 15th, and 17th Sts., and Constitution Ave., NW. 38°53′27″N 77°01′56″W	Monumental Core	
195	US Chamber of Commerce Building	US Chamber of Commerce Building	May 13, 1992 (#92000499)	1615 H St., NW. 38°54′01″N 77°02′17″W	Golden Triangle	
196	U.S. Civil Service Commission Building	U.S. Civil Service Commission Building	September 18, 2013 (#13000713)	1724 F St., NW; 38°53′50″N 77°02′27″W	Golden Triangle	
197	US Courthouse-District of Columbia	US Courthouse-District of Columbia	July 5, 2007 (#07000640)	333 Constitution Ave. NW; 38°53′22″N 77°01′02″W	Downtown East	
198	U.S. Court Of Military Appeals	U.S. Court Of Military Appeals	January 21, 1974 (#74002174)	450 E St., NW. 38°53′44″N 77°01′07″W	Downtown East	
199	U.S. Department of Agriculture Administration Building	U.S. Department of Agriculture Administration Building	January 24, 1974 (#74002175)	12th St. and Jefferson Dr., SW. 38°53′17″N 77°01′49″W	Southwest Federal Center	
200	U.S. Department of Agriculture Cotton Annex	U.S. Department of Agriculture Cotton Annex	October 5, 2015 (#15000683)	300 12th St., SW. 38°53′08″N 77°01′40″W	Southwest Federal Center	
201	U.S. Department of Agriculture South Building	U.S. Department of Agriculture South Building	July 5, 2007 (#07000643)	14th St. and Independence Ave., SW. 38°53′12″N 77°01′48″W	Southwest Federal Center	
202	U.S. Department of Housing and Urban Development	U.S. Department of Housing and Urban Development	August 26, 2008 (#08000824)	451 7th St., SW. 38°53′02″N 77°01′19″W	Southwest Federal Center	Known as "Robert C. Weaver Federal Building", it was designed by Marcel Breuer
203	US Department of the Interior Building	US Department of the Interior Building	November 10, 1986 (#86002898)	Eighteenth and C Sts. NW; 38°53′41″N 77°01′54″W	Monumental Core	
204	U.S. Department of State Building	U.S. Department of State Building	August 21, 2017 (#100001481)	2201 C St. NW. 38°53′40″N 77°02′54″W	Monumental Core	Known as the Harry S. Truman Building
205	U.S. Department of the Treasury	U.S. Department of the Treasury	November 11, 1971 (#71001007)	1500 Pennsylvania Ave., NW; 38°53′53″N 77°02′04″W	Monumental Core	
206	US General Accounting Office Building	US General Accounting Office Building	September 21, 1995 (#95001086)	441 G St., NW. 38°53′56″N 77°01′04″W	Chinatown	
207	US Public Health Service Building	US Public Health Service Building	July 5, 2007 (#07000641)	1951 Constitution Ave. NW; 38°53′34″N 77°02′40″W	Monumental Core	
208	USS SEQUOIA (yacht)	USS SEQUOIA (yacht)	December 23, 1987 (#87002594)	Gangplank Marina (as of 2010); 38°52′32″N 77°01′21″W	Southwest Waterfront	
209	U.S. Tax Court	U.S. Tax Court	August 26, 2008 (#08000821)	400 2nd St., NW. 38°53′43″N 77°00′52″W	Downtown East	
210	University Club of Washington, DC	University Club of Washington, DC	April 4, 2024 (#100010128)	1135 Sixteenth Street, NW; 38°54′18″N 77°02′10″W		
211	Vietnam Veterans Memorial	Vietnam Veterans Memorial	November 13, 1982 (#01000285)	West end of Constitution Gardens; 38°53′27″N 77°02′50″W	Monumental Core	
212	Virginia Interlocking Control Tower	Virginia Interlocking Control Tower	April 10, 2017 (#100000846)	Southeastern corner of 2nd St. and Virginia Ave., SW. 38°53′01″N 77°00′49″W	Southwest Federal Center	
213	Waggaman-Ray Commercial Row	Waggaman-Ray Commercial Row	February 24, 1995 (#95000162)	1141, 1143, and 1145 Connecticut Ave. 38°54′15″N 77°02′28″W	Golden Triangle	
214	George Washington University-Old West End Historic District	George Washington University-Old West End Historic District	January 27, 2015 (#14001207)	Between F, I, 19th, and 23rd Sts., NW. and Virginia Ave., NW. 38°53′56″N 77°02′51″W	George Washington University	
215	Washington Monument	Washington Monument	October 15, 1966 (#66000035)	The Mall, between 14th and 17th Sts., NW. 38°53′23″N 77°02′09″W	Monumental Core	
216	Watergate Complex	Watergate Complex	October 12, 2005 (#05000540)	2500, 2600, 2650, and 2600 Virginia Ave., NW, and 600 and 700 New Hampshire Ave., NW; 38°53′56″N 77°03′17″W	Foggy Bottom	
217	Westory Building	Westory Building	September 10, 2012 (#12000778)	607 14th St., NW; 38°53′53″N 77°01′54″W	Downtown	
218	Margaret Wetzel House	Margaret Wetzel House	October 25, 1990 (#90001542)	714 21st St., NW. 38°53′56″N 77°02′50″W	George Washington University	Part of George Washington University for various academic programs.
219	Wheat Row	Wheat Row	July 23, 1973 (#73002125)	1315, 1317, 1319, and 1321 4th St., SW. 38°52′26″N 77°01′05″W	Southwest Waterfront	
220	Emily Wiley House	Emily Wiley House	May 26, 2006 (#06000192)	902 3rd St., NW; 38°54′12″N 77°00′56″W	Mount Vernon Triangle	
221	Willard Hotel	Willard Hotel	February 15, 1974 (#74002177)	1401-1409 Pennsylvania Ave., NW. 38°53′49″N 77°01′58″W	Downtown	
222	Winder Building	Winder Building	March 24, 1969 (#69000303)	604 17th St., NW. 38°53′51″N 77°02′25″W	Golden Triangle	
223	Wire Building	Wire Building	January 23, 2013 (#12001195)	1000 Vermont Ave., NW; 38°54′10″N 77°02′02″W	Downtown	
224	Maxwell Woodhull House	Maxwell Woodhull House	April 12, 1991 (#90001543)	2033 G St., NW. 38°53′54″N 77°02′48″W	George Washington University	Part of George Washington University, houses the Albert Small Washingtonia Collection.
225	World War I Memorial at Pershing Park	World War I Memorial at Pershing Park	August 6, 2025 (#100012083)	Between Pennsylvania Avenue NW (north and south), and 14th and 15th Streets NW; 38°53′46″N 77°01′58″W		
226	Yale Steam Laundry	Yale Steam Laundry	March 18, 1999 (#99000332)	437-443 New York Ave., NW. 38°54′17″N 77°01′05″W	Mount Vernon Square	

== See also ==
- List of National Historic Landmarks in Washington, D.C.
- National Register of Historic Places listings in Washington, D.C.
