= Bulletin Building =

Bulletin Building may refer to:

- Bulletin Building, Rockhampton, a heritage-listed newspaper publishing building in Queensland, Australia
- Bulletin Building, Washington, D.C., a heritage-listed newspaper publishing building in the United States of America
