= Oriental Building Association No. 6 Building =

- U.S. National Register of Historic Places
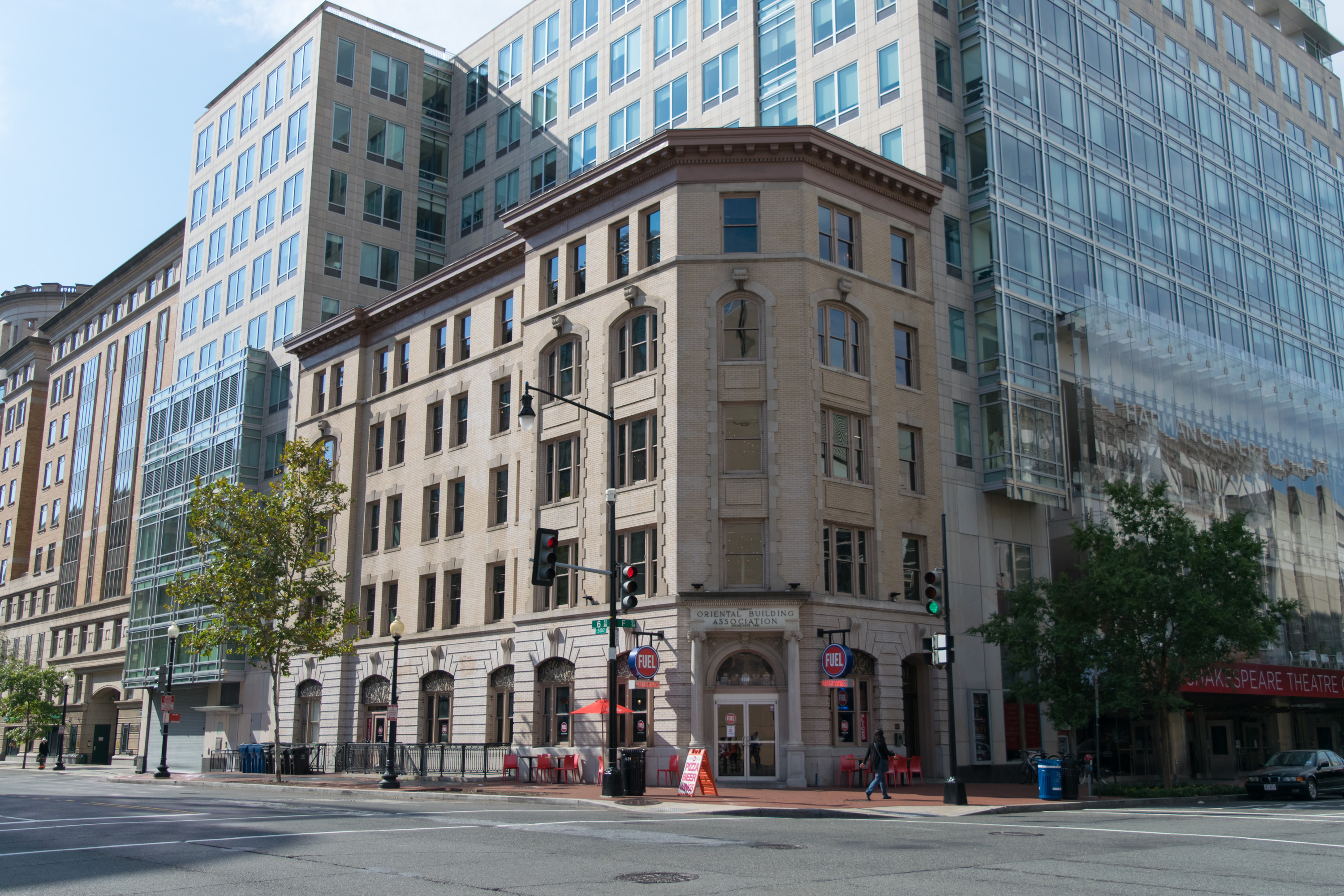
- Oriental Building Association No. 6 Building in 2016

- Location within Central Washington, D.C. Location within the District of Columbia Location within the United States
- Location: 600 F Street, N.W. Washington, D.C.
- Coordinates: 38°53′49.88″N 77°1′12.46″W
- Built: 1909
- Architect: Albert Goehner
- Architectural style: Italian Renaissance Revival
- NRHP reference No.: 04000956
- Added to NRHP: September 10, 2004

The Oriental Building Association No. 6 Building is a historic building, located at 600 F Street, Northwest Washington, D.C. in the Penn Quarter neighborhood.

== History ==
It was designed by Albert Goehner, in the Italian Renaissance Revival style.

It was the headquarters of the Oriental Building Association founded by German immigrants in 1861. It is the oldest savings and loan association in the United States.

It is currently the home of a Fuel Pizza franchise.

== See also ==
- National Register of Historic Places listings in central Washington, D.C.
