= Golden Triangle (Washington, D.C.) =

Business improvement district in Washington D.C., United States

Coordinates: 38.905027°N 77.042398°W

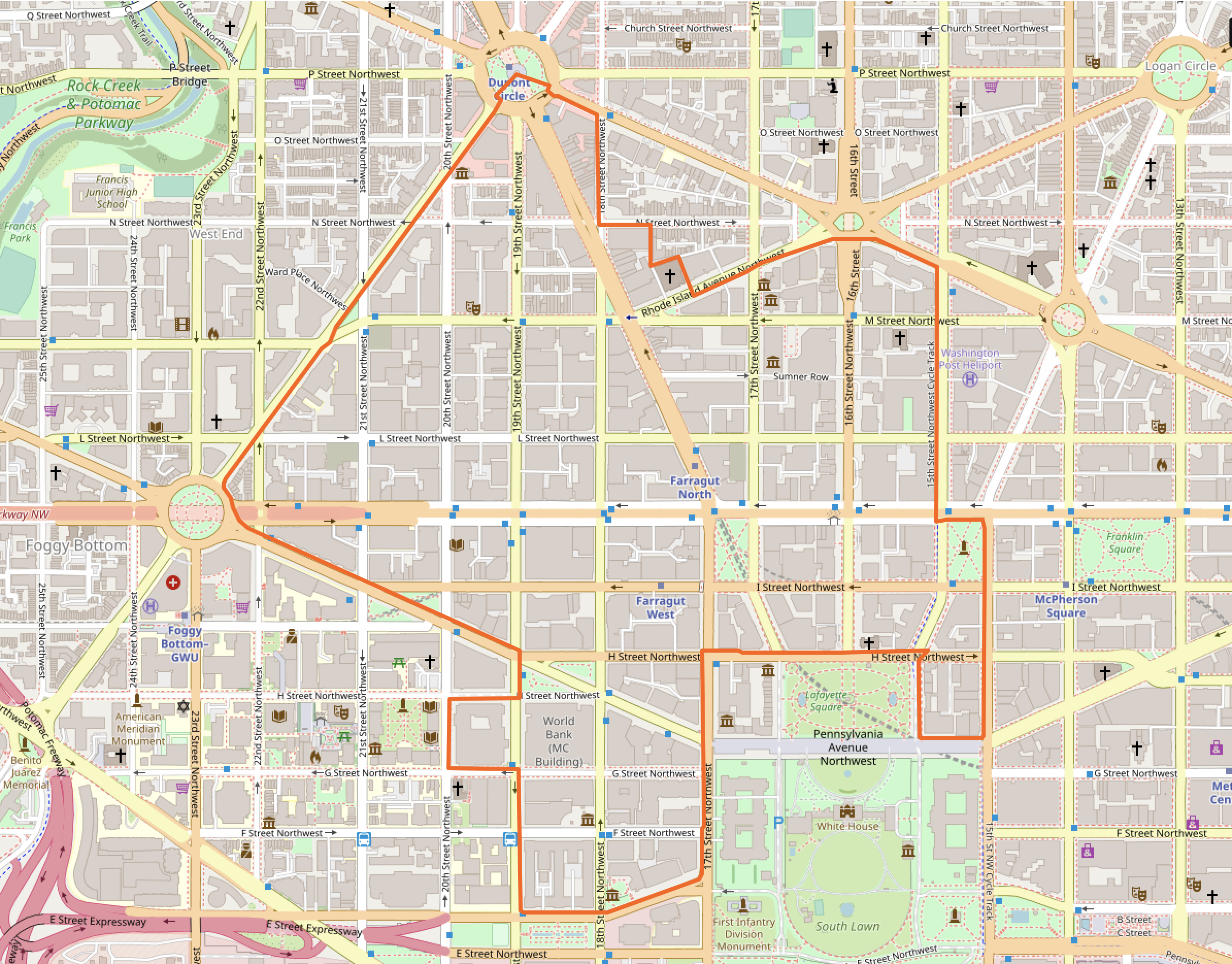
Map of Golden Triangle

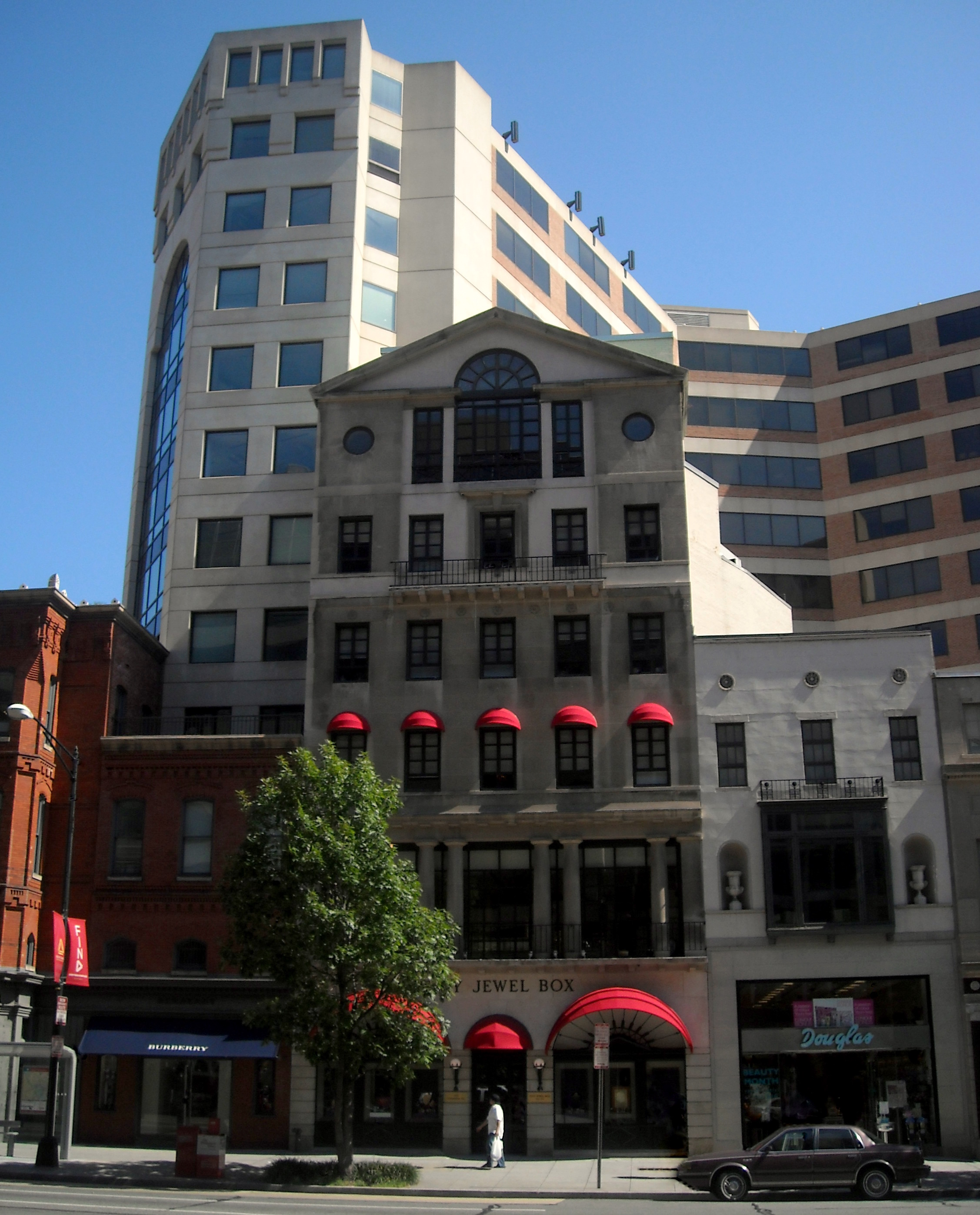
Tiny Jewel Box storefront on Connecticut Avenue

The Golden Triangle is a neighborhood and business improvement district (BID) in Washington, D.C., United States. Covering 43 blocks, it encompasses the western part of Washington's central business district, running from the front yard of the White House's north side to Dupont Circle and from 16th Street NW to 21st Street NW and including sections of K Street and Connecticut Avenue. The commercial neighborhood is home to more than 3,000 organizations, 200 restaurants, 300 shops and retailers, 7 hotels, and 6 national parks.

The Golden Triangle BID was created in 1997 by the District of Columbia City Council and approved by Mayor Marion Barry.

The Golden Triangle BID is supported by a special assessment collected by the District of Columbia from owners of property within the BID's boundaries. Businesses that are located within the Golden Triangle BID's boundaries are automatically members of the BID. The BID is governed by a board of directors composed of up to twenty-three such members.

== Shopping ==
Connecticut Avenue around L Street is a small retail node, with office buildings and ground floor retail branches of major mall retailers such as Sephora, H&M, Men's Wearhouse, The Gap, Ann Taylor, Bluemercury, Allen Edmonds, Johnston & Murphy, and nearby a Nordstrom Rack, providing an alternative to the much larger F Street Shopping District further east. Tiny Jewel Box is a jewelry store located in a historic building along Connecticut Avenue.

== Transportation ==
The Golden Triangle is home to Farragut West, Farragut North, and Dupont Circle stations, which carry the Blue, Silver, Orange and Red Washington Metro lines. Numerous Metrobus routes pass through the Golden Triangle, along with the DC Circulator bus route from Georgetown to Union Station.

== Points of interest ==
- World Bank Group headquarters
- International Finance Corporation headquarters
- Farragut Square
- Black Lives Matter Plaza
- Renwick Gallery
- Charles Sumner School Museum
- Thaddeus Stevens School
- Sixteenth Street Historic District
- The Square Food Hall
- ABC News Washington Bureau
- DC Improv Comedy Club
- Alibi Club
- James Monroe Park
