= Myrene Apartment Building =

- U.S. National Register of Historic Places
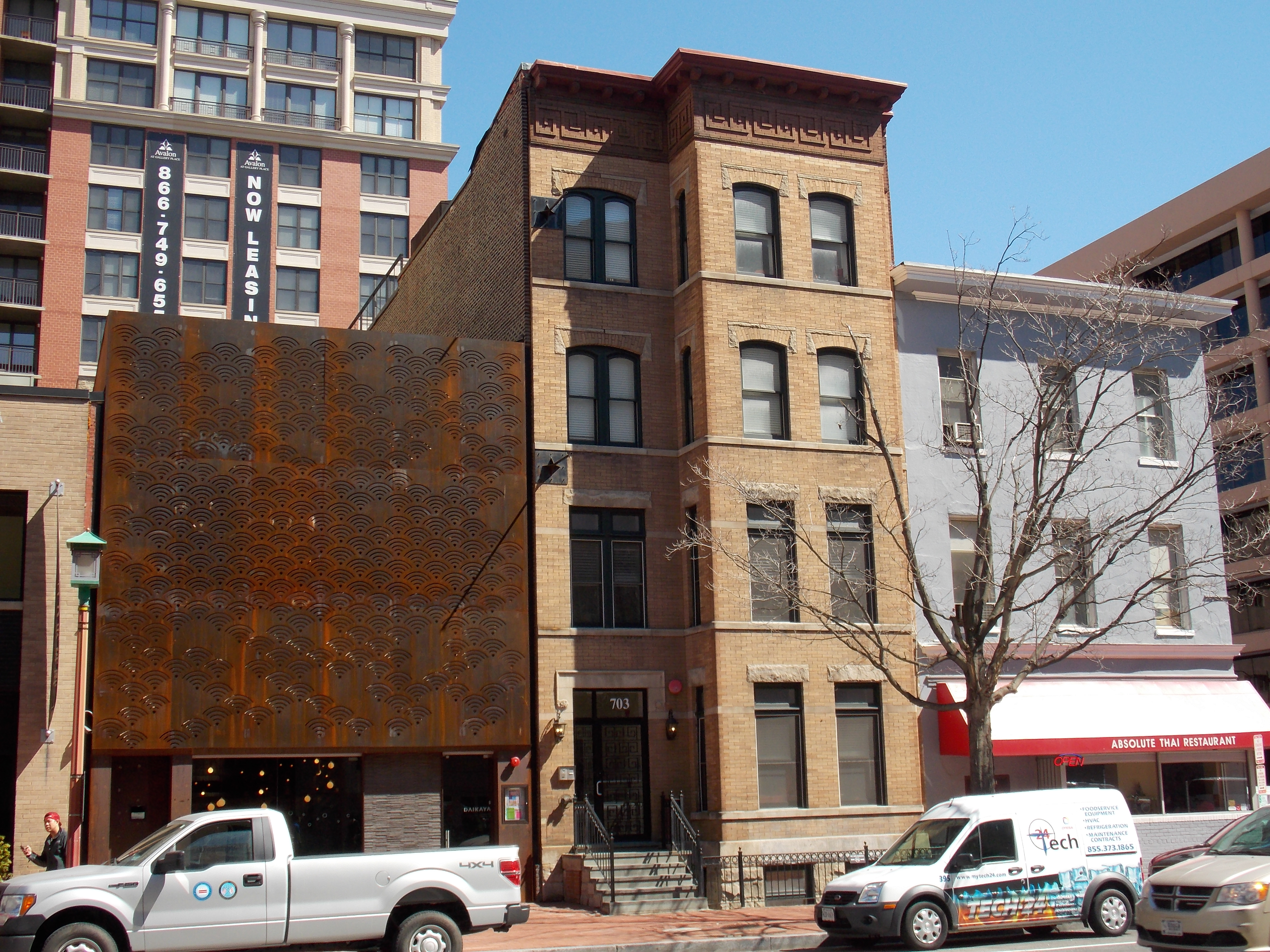

- Location within Washington, D.C.
- Location: 703 6th Street NW; Washington, D.C.
- Coordinates: 38°53′55″N 77°1′11″W
- Built: 1897-1898
- Architect: J.H. McIntyre
- Architectural style: Late Victorian
- MPS: Apartment Buildings in Washington, DC, MPS
- NRHP reference No.: 94001041
- Added to NRHP: September 9, 1994

The Myrene Apartment Building is an historic structure located at 703 6th Street, Northwest, Washington, D.C., in the Chinatown neighborhood.

== History ==
J.H. McIntyre was the architect for this middle-class apartment flat with its eclectic Romanesque Revival facade. The building exemplifies the evolution of multi-family apartment buildings from the row-house form. It was listed on the National Register of Historic Places in 1994.

== See also ==
- National Register of Historic Places listings in central Washington, D.C.
