= Oscar W. Underwood House =

Historic house in Washington, D.C., United States

- U.S. National Register of Historic Places
- U.S. National Historic Landmark
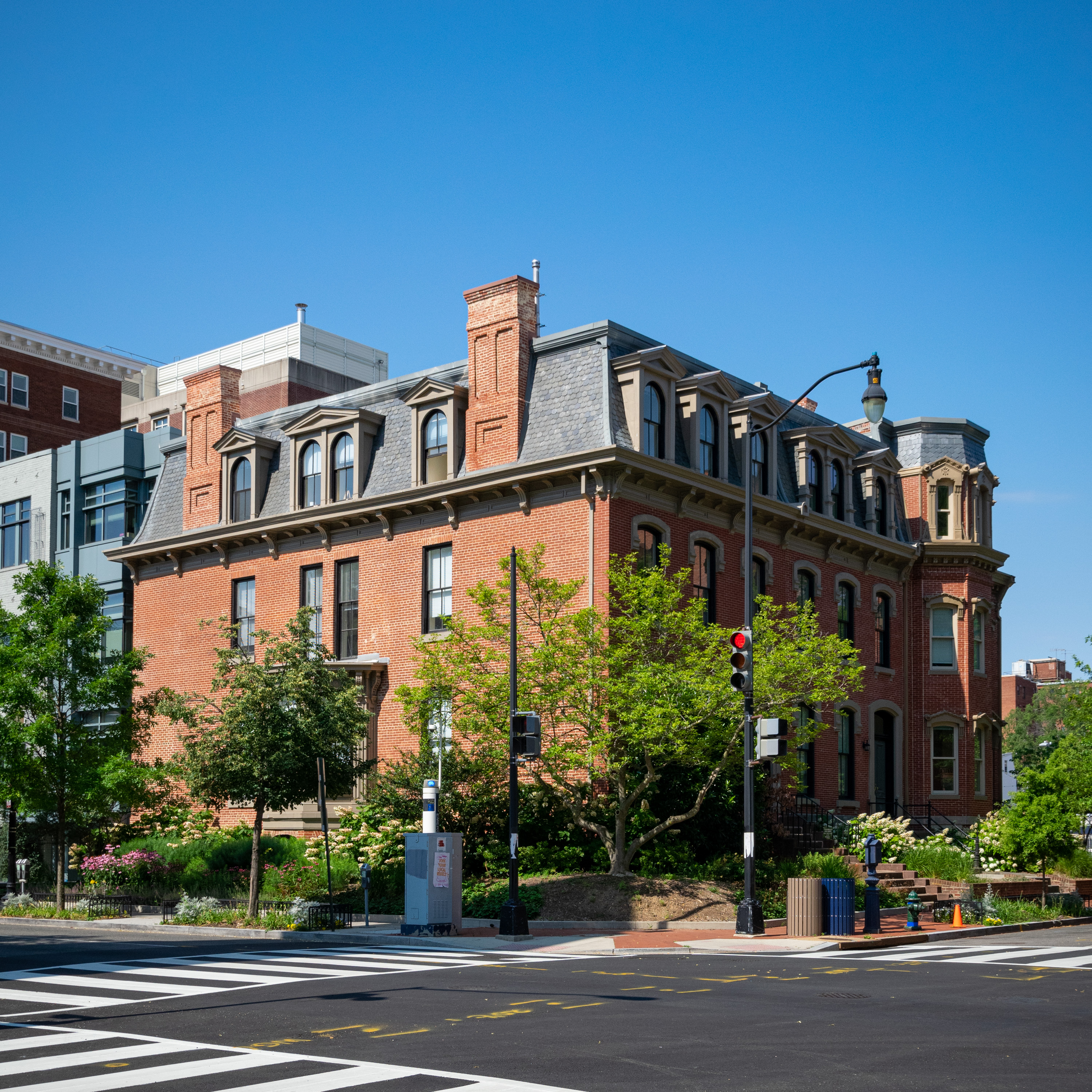

- Location within Central Washington, D.C. Location within the District of Columbia Location within the United States
- Location: 2000 G Street, NW, Washington, D.C.
- Coordinates: 38°53′53″N 77°2′43″W
- Built: c. 1870
- Architectural style: Second Empire
- NRHP reference No.: 76002132

Significant dates
- Added to NRHP: December 8, 1976
- Designated NHL: December 8, 1976

The Oscar W. Underwood House is a historic house located in the Foggy Bottom neighborhood Northwest, Washington, D.C. It is nationally significant for its association with Major Archibald Butt (military aide to both presidents Theodore Roosevelt and William Howard Taft), and painter Francis Davis Millet – both of whom died in the Titanic disaster on April 15, 1912 – and also Alabama politician Oscar Underwood (1862–1929) who lived there 1914–1925. It was the first long-term home of the Washington College of Law, the nation's first law school founded and run by women. The property was declared a National Historic Landmark in 1976. The building presently houses a legal aid clinic operated by George Washington University.

== Description and history ==
The Oscar Underwood House stands in Washington's Foggy Bottom neighborhood, at the southwest corner of G and 20th Streets NW. It is a 2 1/2-story brick building, with a mansard roof providing a full third floor over its main block. It is one of three similar row houses extending along G Street. Its main facade is three bays wide, with the entrance in the rightmost bay. The entrance and windows are set in segmented-arch openings with bracketed and eared stone hoods, the windows with bracketed sills. The mansard roof is pierced by dormers on both the front and side, with round-arch windows framed by pilastered and pedimented gables. The interior retains some of its original finishes, with larger rooms subdivided into offices.

The house is the only known residence to survive relatively intact from the period of its association with Oscar Underwood. Underwood was a conservative Southern Democrat at the height of his influence in the first decades of the 20th century. He served in major leadership positions in both houses of Congress, and was several times a serious contender for the Democrat nomination for President of the United States. In 1926 he retired to the Woodlawn plantation.

After Underwood left the house, it was acquired by the Washington College of Law. It was founded in 1898 by Ellen Spencer Mussey and Emma Gillett, who were both refused admission to several law schools but eventually entered the bar despite that handicap. Working with limited financial resources, the school occupied a number of inadequate quarters for the first quarter century of its existence, eventually raising funds in 1920 for its first permanent home on K Street. It soon outgrew that, and purchased this building from Senator Underwood in 1924. It remained the school's home until 1952, having merged into the American University in 1949. Some of the school's many early female graduates were instrumental in legal aspects of gaining women's suffrage in the 1910s and 1920s.

== See also ==
- List of National Historic Landmarks in Washington, D.C.
- National Register of Historic Places listings in central Washington, D.C.
