= Westory Building =

- U.S. National Register of Historic Places
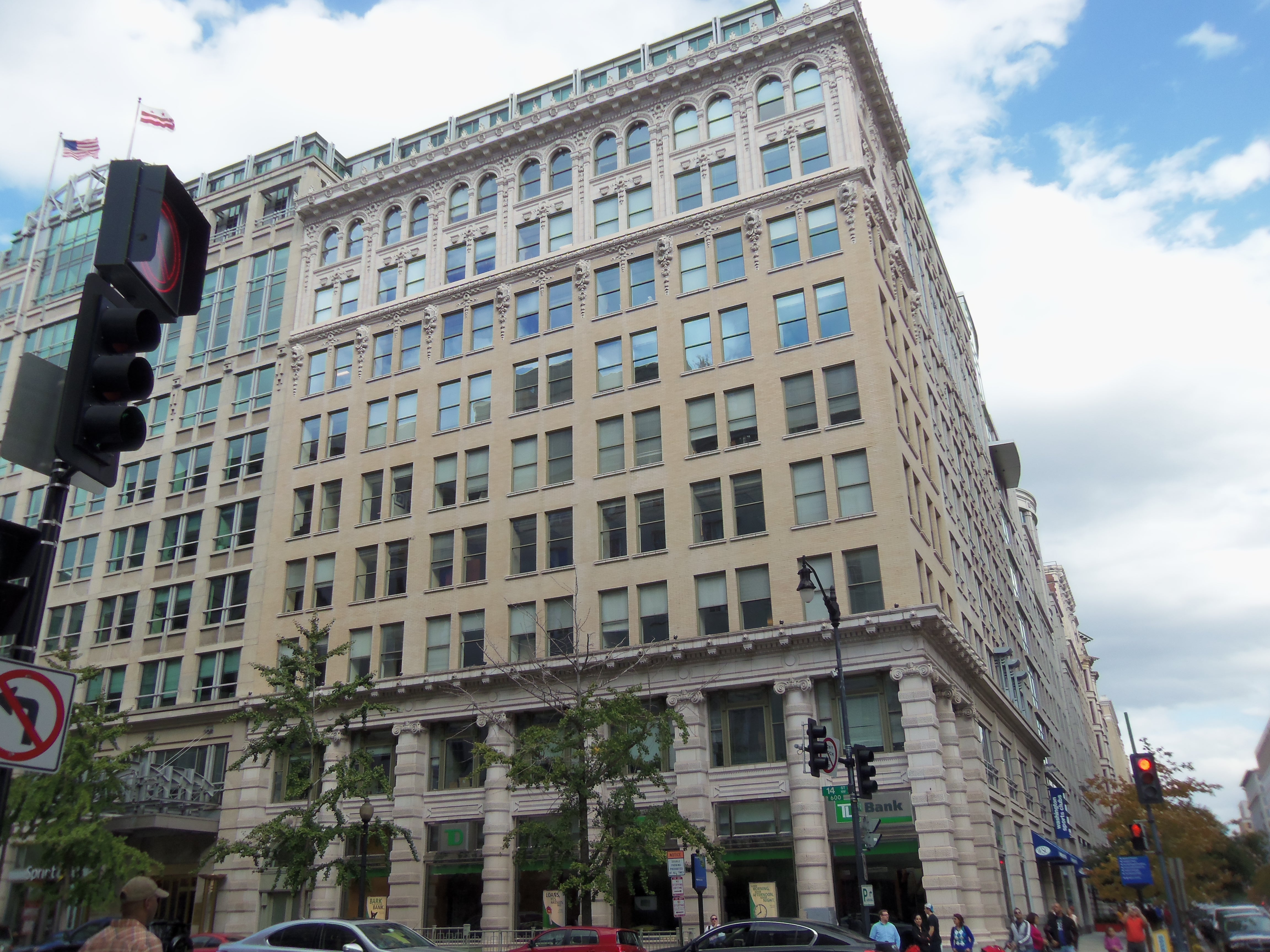
- Westory Building in 2012

- Location within District of Columbia Location within the United States
- Location: 607 14th St., NW; Washington, D.C.
- Coordinates: 38°53′52″N 77°01′53.7″W
- Built: 1907-1908
- Architect: Henry L.A. Jekel
- NRHP reference No.: 12000778
- Added to NRHP: September 10, 2012

The Westory Building is an historic structure located in Downtown Washington, D.C. It was listed on both the District of Columbia Inventory of Historic Sites and on the National Register of Historic Places in 2012. The building was designed by architect Henry L.A. Jekel and built between 1907 and 1908. The present structure includes an expansion of the original structure. The expansion was designed by Shalom Baranes Associates and completed in 1990. The building is now twelve-stories above ground rising to a height of 155.62 feet (47 m). It also has three-stories below ground.
