= Town Center East =

Apartment complex in Washington, D.C.

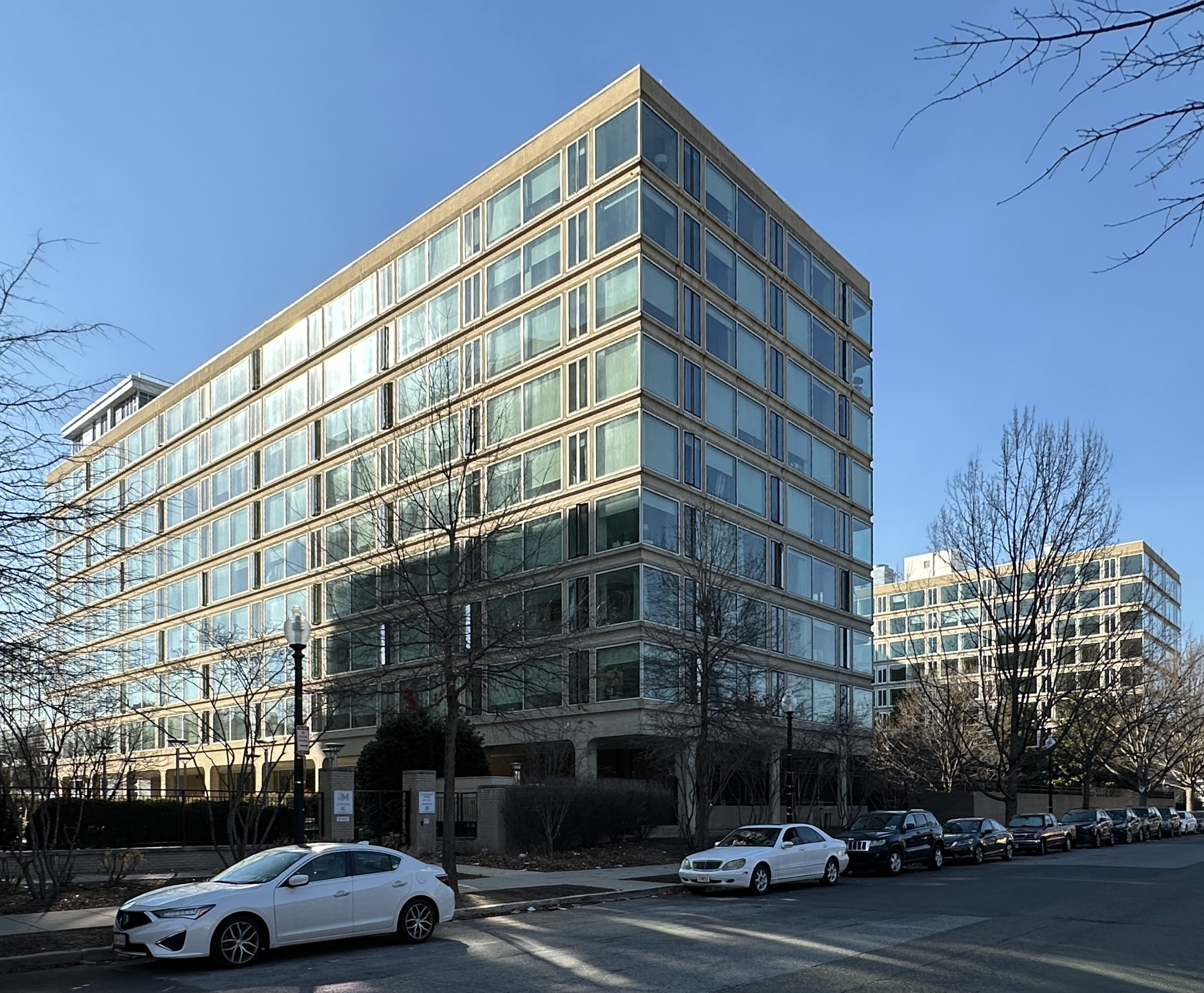
- Town Center East in 2026
- Interactive map of the Town Center East area

General information
- Location: 1001 and 1101 3rd Street, SW, Washington, D.C., United States
- Coordinates: 38.877449°N 77.015699°W
- Town Center East
- U.S. National Register of Historic Places
- Location within Central Washington, D.C.
- NRHP reference No.: 13001071
- Added to NRHP: January 15, 2014

Town Center East is an apartment complex in the Southwest quadrant of Washington, D.C., built in 1960–1961. The twin apartment buildings are across the street from Town Center West; both developments are part of the Town Center Plaza mixed-use development. Town Center East, as well as the plaza as a whole, was designed by I.M. Pei on behalf of William Zeckendorf, who worked with the firm Webb and Knapp.

The development of Town Center East was part of a broader redevelopment of Southwest Washington, D.C. that included the construction of L'Enfant Plaza. The city's Redevelopment Land Agency had awarded Zeckendorf an exclusive-rights agreement to redevelop Southwest in 1954, and in 1956 the original plans were developed. The plan changed significantly in the following years, due in part to operational difficulties at Webb and Knapp, and the plan for a more grandiose development was scaled back to the two apartment complexes and one building of the retail center, the retail center not being built until the early 1970s.

Town Center East was added to the National Register of Historic Places on January 15, 2014.
