= Alibi Club =

- U.S. National Register of Historic Places
- D.C. Inventory of Historic Sites
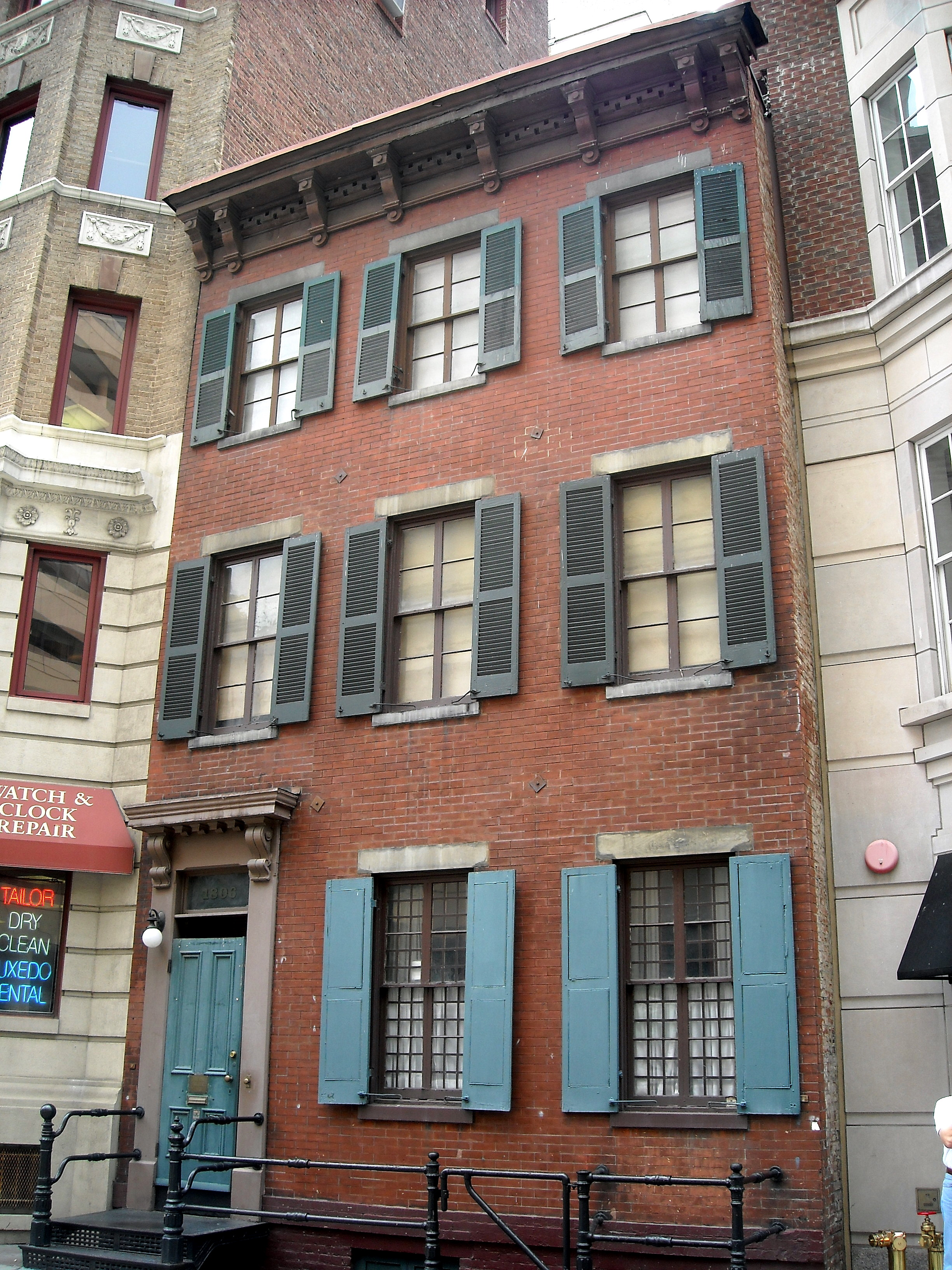
- Alibi Club in 2008

- Location within Central Washington, D.C. Location within the District of Columbia Location within the United States
- Location: 1806 I Street, NW; Washington, D.C.
- Coordinates: 38°54′4.2″N 77°2′31.4″W
- Built: 1869
- Architectural style: Italianate
- NRHP reference No.: 94001221

Significant dates
- Added to NRHP: October 21, 1994
- Designated DCIHS: June 17, 1992

The Alibi Club is a traditional gentlemen's private club in Washington, D.C. Its members consist of the Washington elite, including presidents, senators, and diplomats, among other prominent figures.

The club is organized under United States laws for 501(c)(7) Social and Recreation Clubs. In 2023, it claimed total revenue of $467,811 and total assets of $508,297.

== History ==
In 1884, seven Washingtonians (Note: Marcellus Bailey, B. H. Buckingham, W. C. Charlton, John Davis, David Jones, Linden Kent, and Dr. Francis B. Loring.) founded the Alibi Club, a private social club of prominent political and social figures. Its name derived from the club's practice of providing an alibi when the member's family questioned the whereabouts of a member. The club's founding purpose was to foster "mutual improvement, education, and enlightenment" and to "to relieve the mind of what some call the monotony of domestic life and the routine and toil of business" among members of Washington society. Its founders were all originally members of the Metropolitan Club, which had a more of a military character. Membership also extended to out-of-town figures from New York City, Boston, and Philadelphia, most likely to share information between communities and help in the development of strategies to address civic issues. Throughout its history, it has hosted numerous world leaders, including King Leopold of Belgium, Prince Albert of Belgium, Prince Henry of Prussia, and Viceroy Li Hongzhang.

=== Clubhouse ===
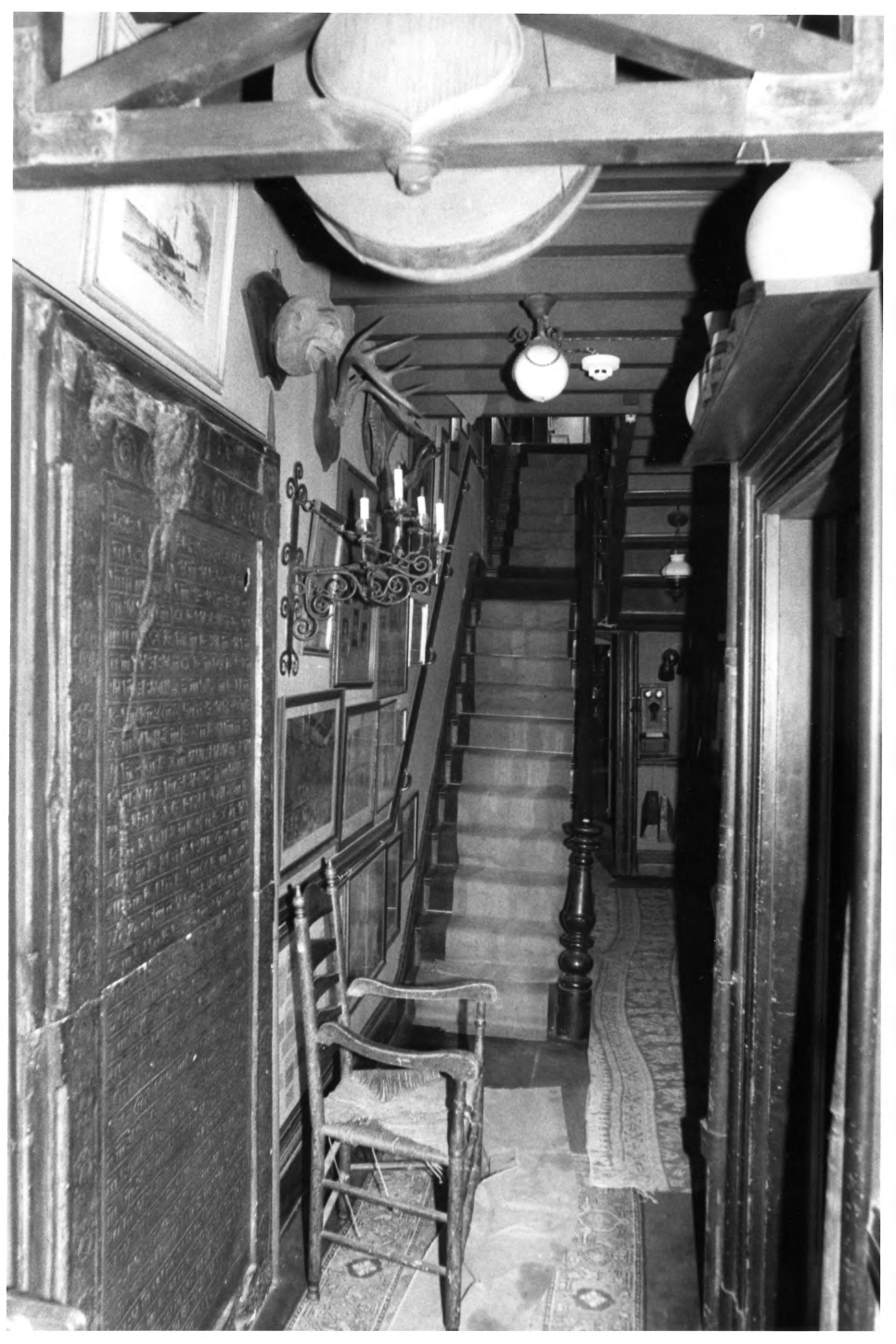
Inside the Alibi Club in 1992

The first clubhouse was situated at 17th and Pennsylvania Avenue, NW. Since 1886, the club has occupied a three-story, brick townhouse blocks away from the White House. The clubhouse is furnished with donated memorabilia and artifacts covering nearly every available wall section on the first two floors. The clubhouse is also notable as a well-preserved example of residential architecture in a commercial district and was added to the National Register of Historic Places on October 21, 1994. In 2018, the building was listed as a vacant property, but saw a resurgence in activity in the weeks following the designation.

== Membership ==
Membership is limited to fifty, with new members admitted upon unanimous vote after the death of a previous member. Membership is not revealed to outsiders, and the first public notice of membership is often in a member's obituary.

Some of the Alibi Club's most prominent members have included: President George H. W. Bush, his father, Senator Prescott Bush, Supreme Court Justices Potter Stewart and Stanley F. Reed, Allen Dulles and John Foster Dulles, Speaker of the House Nicholas Longworth, and General George C. Marshall.

- David M. Abshire
- David Acheson
- Dean Acheson
- Theodore Achilles
- Lamar Alexander
- Chandler Anderson
- Larz Anderson
- Warren R. Austin
- Truxtun Beale
- Gist Blair
- Robert Woods Bliss
- Frederick N. Brooke
- David K.E. Bruce
- George H. W. Bush
- Prescott Bush
- George E. Corcoran
- Thomas Gardiner Corcoran
- Dwight F. Davis
- Allen Dulles
- John Foster Dulles
- James Dunn
- Walter Edge
- George A. Garrett
- Charles C. Glover III
- Gordon Gray
- Cary Grayson
- Joseph Grew
- Alfred Gruenther
- Frederick Hale
- George Hamilton, Jr.
- Nelson Hartson
- Christian Herter
- William Hibbs
- Archibald Hopkins
- Walter Bruce Howe
- David B. Karrick
- Samuel Kaufman
- John Kean
- Emory S. Land
- Nicholas Longworth
- Robert A. Lovett
- George C. Marshall
- Clarence Moore
- Benjamin Mosby McKelway
- John Lord O'Brian
- Thomas Nelson Page
- Stanley F. Reed
- Henry Roosevelt
- Jules Henri de Sibour
- Potter Stewart
- James W. Symington
- Maxwell Taylor
- J.W. Wadsworth
- John F. Wilkins
- Clarence R. Wilson
- Blanton Winship
- Jerauld Wright
- William M. Wright
- John Adams Bross
- C. Boyden Gray

== See also ==
- List of traditional gentlemen's clubs in the United States
- National Register of Historic Places listings in central Washington, D.C.
