= Old Engine Company No. 6 =

- U.S. National Register of Historic Places
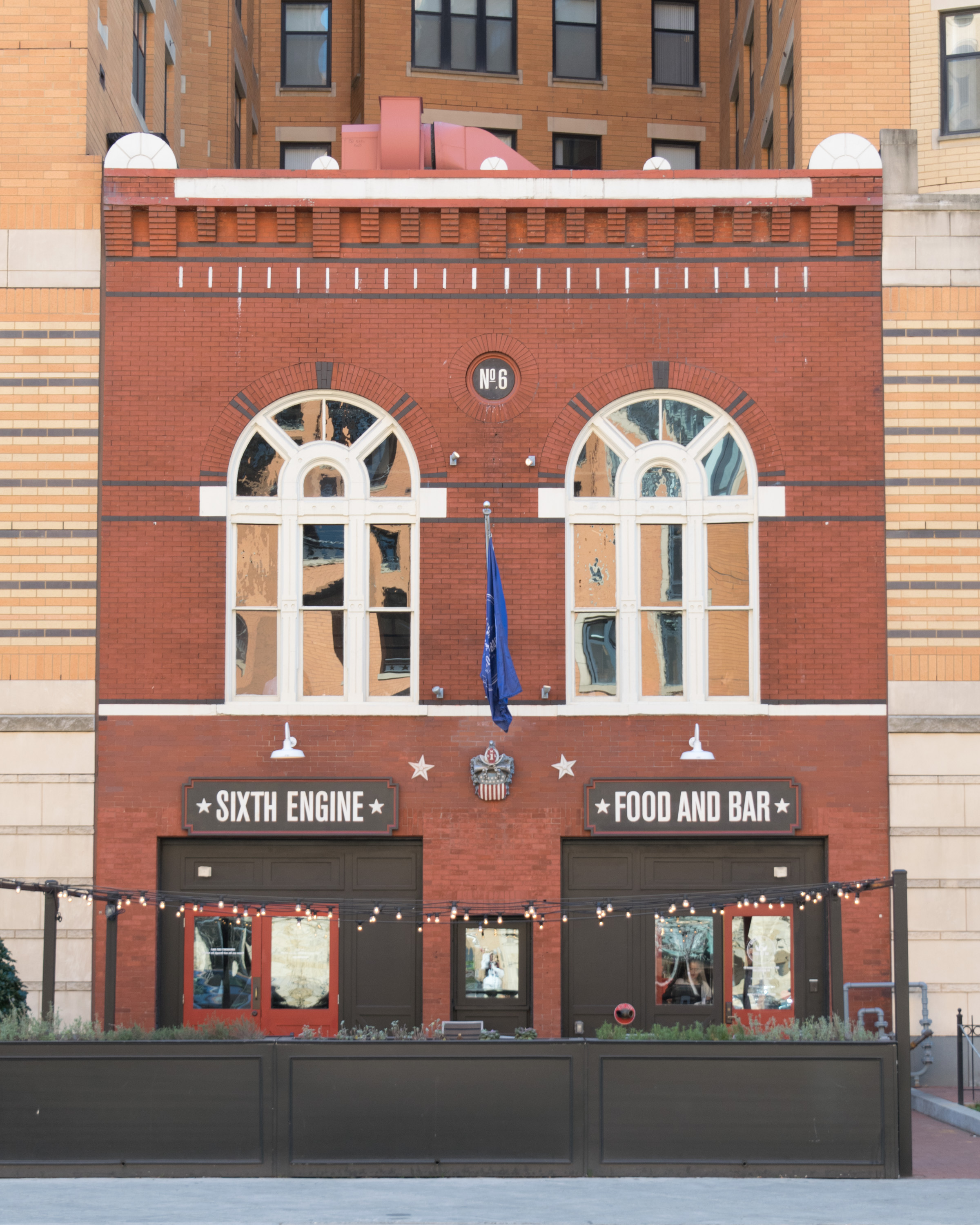
- Old Engine Company No. 6 building (2017)

- Location within the District of Columbia Location within the United States
- Location: 438 Massachusetts Ave., NW., Washington, District of Columbia
- Coordinates: 38°54′1″N 77°1′3″W
- Area: 0.1 acres (0.040 ha)
- Built: 1862
- Architectural style: Italianate
- NRHP reference No.: 75002052
- Added to NRHP: September 5, 1975

The Old Engine Company No. 6 at 438 Massachusetts Ave in Washington, DC is a former District of Columbia Fire Department building which housed Engine 6 between February 17, 1879, and June 27, 1974. The two-story brick building was built during the volunteer period and is the only remaining example from that time.

In 2012, the location was reopened as a restaurant.
