= Bulletin Building, Washington, D.C. =

- Bulletin Building
- U.S. National Register of Historic Places
- D.C. Inventory of Historic Sites
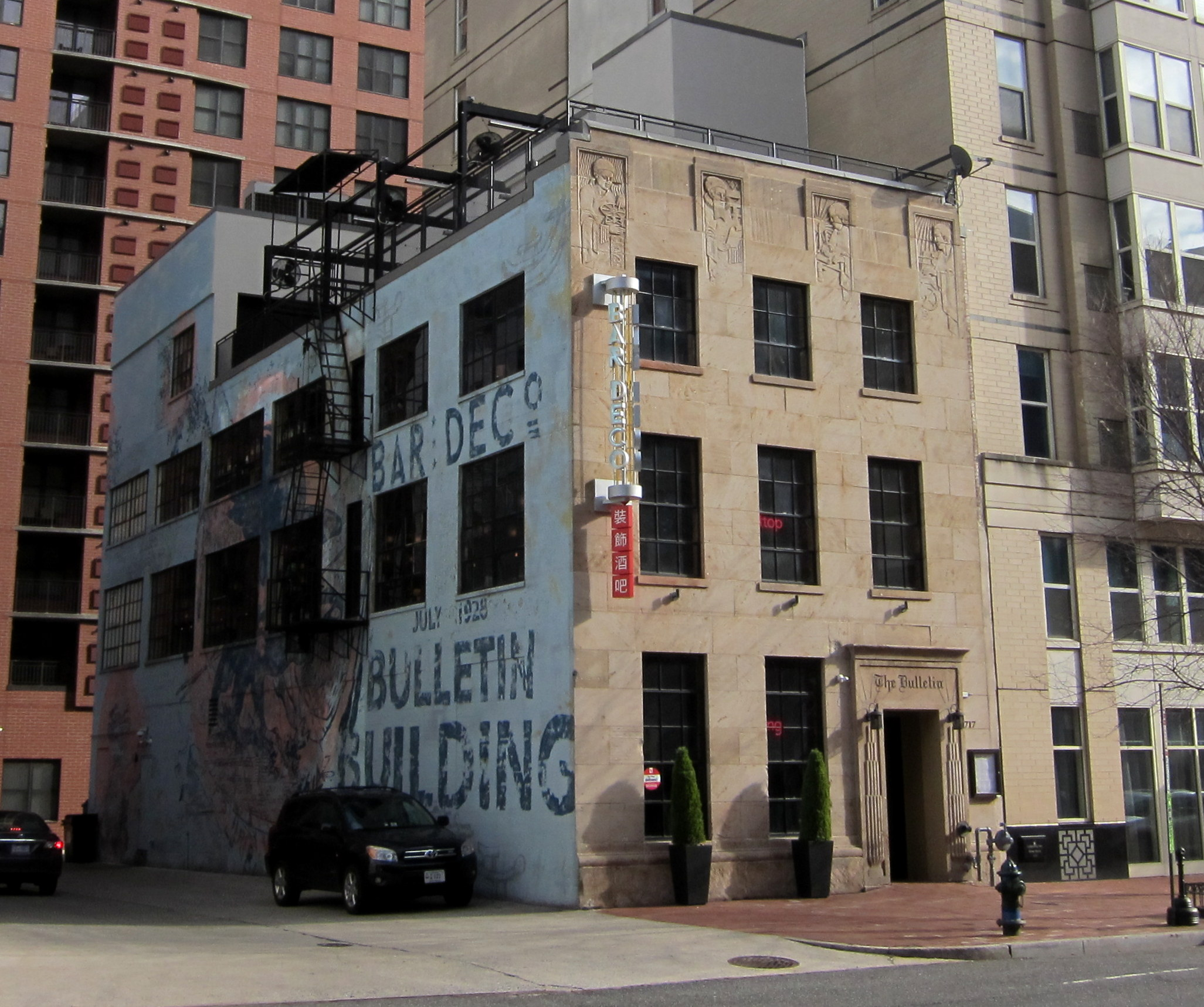
- Bulletin Building in 2017

- Location within Washington, D.C.
- Location: 717 6th Street NW; Washington, D.C.
- Coordinates: 38°53′56″N 77°1′11″W
- Built: 1928
- Architect: Rodier & Kundzin
- Architectural style: Art Deco
- NRHP reference No.: 07000422

Significant dates
- Added to NRHP: November 12, 2008
- Designated DCIHS: September 28, 2006

The Bulletin Building is an historic structure located in the Chinatown neighborhood in Washington, D.C.

== History ==
The architectural firm of Rodier & Kundzin designed the building, constructed in 1928, for the United Publishing Company. The main façade of the building is constructed in limestone, and features four Art Deco bas relief panels that portray the printing trade and ties the building to the trade, that it housed for 60 years.

The building was listed on the National Register of Historic Places in 2008. From 2015 until 2023 the site was the home of a restaurant and nightclub.

== See also ==
- National Register of Historic Places listings in central Washington, D.C.
