= Brownley Confectionery Building =

- U.S. National Register of Historic Places
- D.C. Inventory of Historic Sites
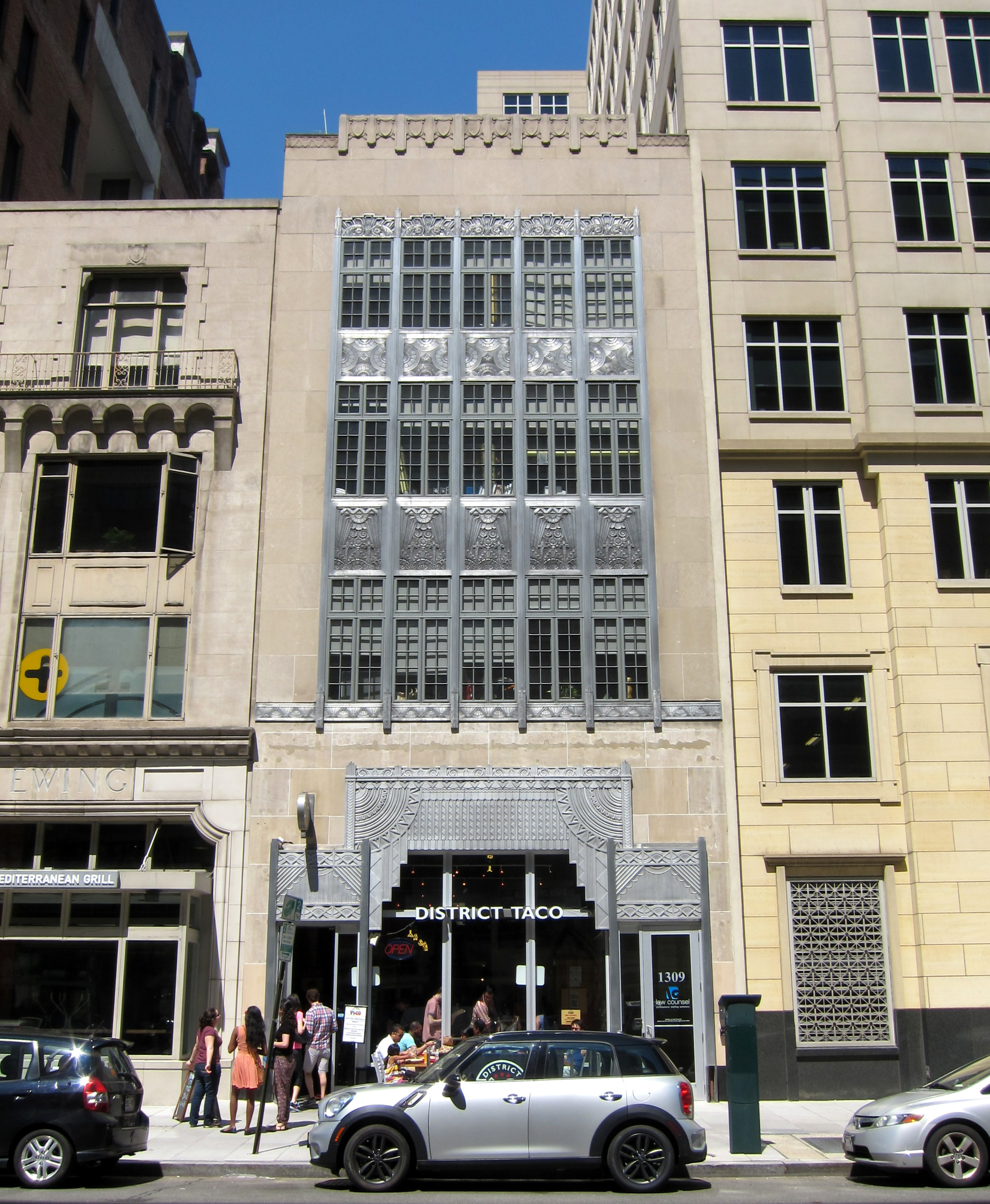
- Brownley Confectionery Building in 2015

- Location within Washington, D.C.
- Location: 1309 F St. NW; Washington, D.C.
- Coordinates: 38°53′51″N 77°1′50″W
- Built: 1932
- Architect: Porter & Lockie
- Architectural style: Art Deco
- NRHP reference No.: 94001408

Significant dates
- Added to NRHP: December 1, 1994
- Designated DCIHS: April 24, 1991

The Brownley Confectionery Building is an historic structure located in Downtown Washington, D.C. The architectural firm of Porter & Lockie designed the building, which is one of the last Art Deco commercial buildings in the downtown area. The limestone façade features aluminum spandrel panels. Completed in 1932, the first floor operated as an air-conditioned retail space with a kitchen and bakery.

It was listed on the National Register of Historic Places in 1994.

Brownley's, Inc., established at 1205 G Street, NW, Washington, DC in 1904, operated several candy and confectionery stores.
