= United Brotherhood of Carpenters and Joiners-Local 132 building =

- United Brotherhood of Carpenters and Joiners-Local 132
- U.S. National Register of Historic Places
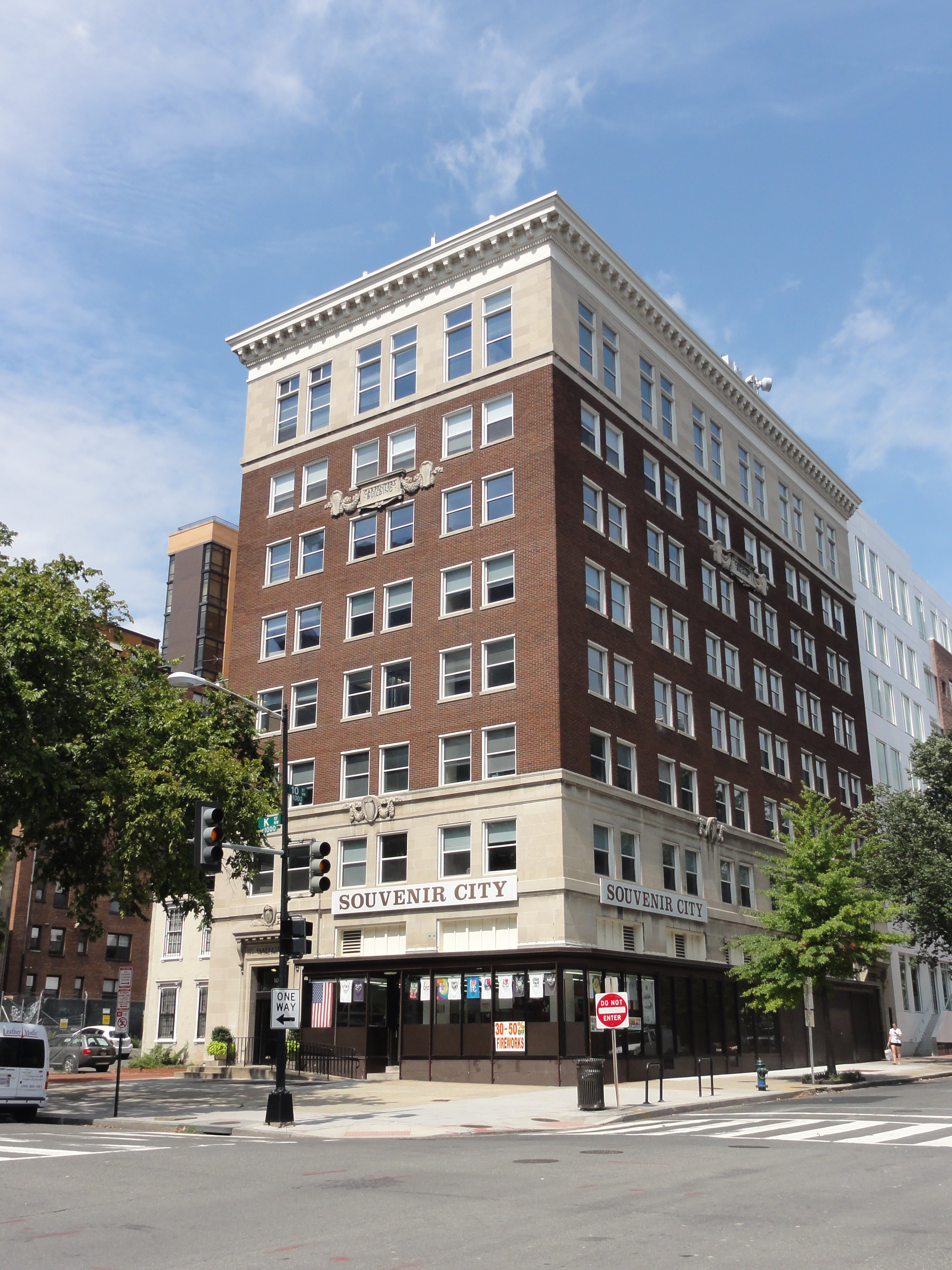
- United Brotherhood of Carpenters and Joiners-Local 132 building in 2012

- Location within Washington, D.C.
- Location: 1010 10th Street, N.W., Washington, D.C.
- Coordinates: 38°54′9.12″N 77°1′35.21″W
- Built: 1926
- Architect: O. Harvey Miller
- Architectural style: Commercial style
- NRHP reference No.: 03000945
- Added to NRHP: September 17, 2003

The Carpenters Building (also known as the United Brotherhood of Carpenters and Joiners-Local 132) is a historic office building located at 1010 10th Street (also known as 1001 K Street, N.W.) Northwest, Washington, D.C., in the Mount Vernon Square neighborhood.

== History ==
The eight-story, brick and limestone, Commercial style office building was designed by architect O. Harvey Miller. It follows Louis Sullivan in his designs of tall office buildings.

The Carpenters Building was believed to be the country's largest building owned by a local union when constructed in 1926. It was sold by the local in 1980.

The property was listed on the National Register of Historic Places, on September 17, 2003.
