= Maxwell Woodhull House =

Historic house in Washington, D.C., United States

- U.S. National Register of Historic Places
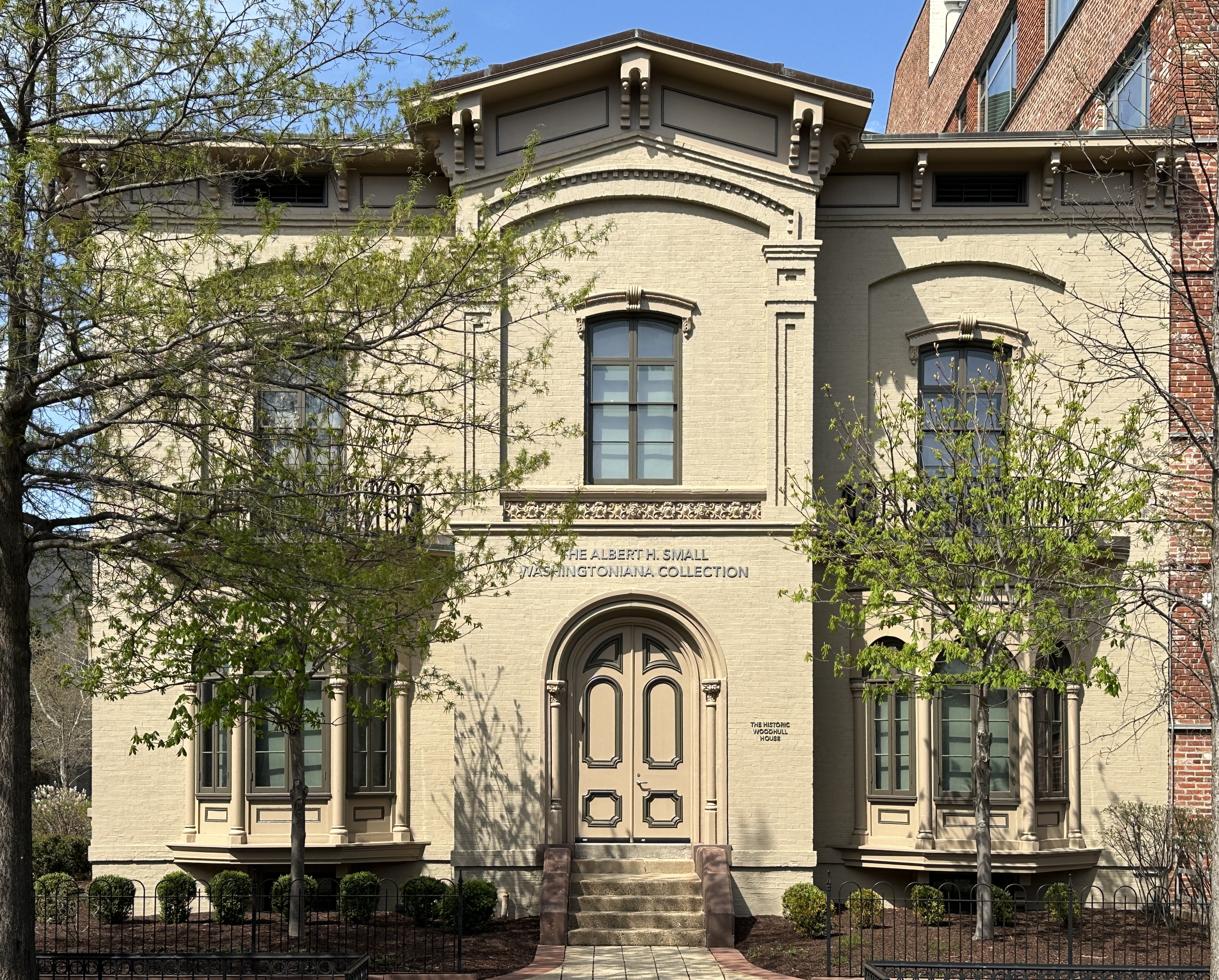
- Maxwell Woodhull House in 2026

- Location within Central Washington, D.C. Location within the District of Columbia Location within the United States
- Location: 2033 G Street, NW, Washington, D.C.
- Coordinates: 38°53′54″N 77°2′48″W
- Built: 1855
- NRHP reference No.: 90001543
- Added to NRHP: April 12, 1991

The Maxwell Woodhull House is a historic residence located at 2033 G Street in Northwest Washington, D.C.

== History ==
The house was constructed in 1855 for Maxwell Woodhull, who was a commander in the United States Navy.

William Henry Seward lived in the house between 1855 and 1858 during his second term as Senator from New York. Seward later served as Secretary of State under Abraham Lincoln and Andrew Johnson. He was an outspoken critic of slavery, was responsible for the Alaska Purchase, and was a major figure in the founding of the modern Republican Party.

In 1921 it was donated to George Washington University by Maxwell Van Zandt Woodhull, son of the original owner, and a brigadier general in the United States Army. General Woodhull served as a trustee of the university and had an important role in development of the university. The Woodhull Memorial Flagstaff at Arlington National Cemetery is dedicated in memory of the Woodhulls.

The house is designed in the Italianate style, though the architect is unknown. It sits at the intersection of G and 20th streets, in a block known as Square 102. It is a two-story, brick building. The main facade facing G Street contains the front door, set back within an arched entryway. On either side of the entrance, window bays protrude from the main structure. On the second floor, windows sit directly above the first floor door and windows.

Maxwell Van Zandt Woodhull was elected a trustee of the university in 1911, and influenced the University Board to move their primary offices from the central business district to a rented building at 2023 G Street. The next year they purchased the building at 2023 and began renting and purchasing others in the immediate area surrounding the Woodhull House. The university used the buildings surrounding Woodhull's as a starting point in relocating the center of campus to the Foggy Bottom neighborhood, and greatly developed the immediate area. Woodhull was also responsible for establishing a student artillery corps, which helped to maintain the university's enrollment during World War I.

The building served as the headquarters of the George Washington University Police until 2012, when the police moved to the Academic Center.
