= Margaret Wetzel House =

Historic house in Washington, D.C., United States

- U.S. National Register of Historic Places
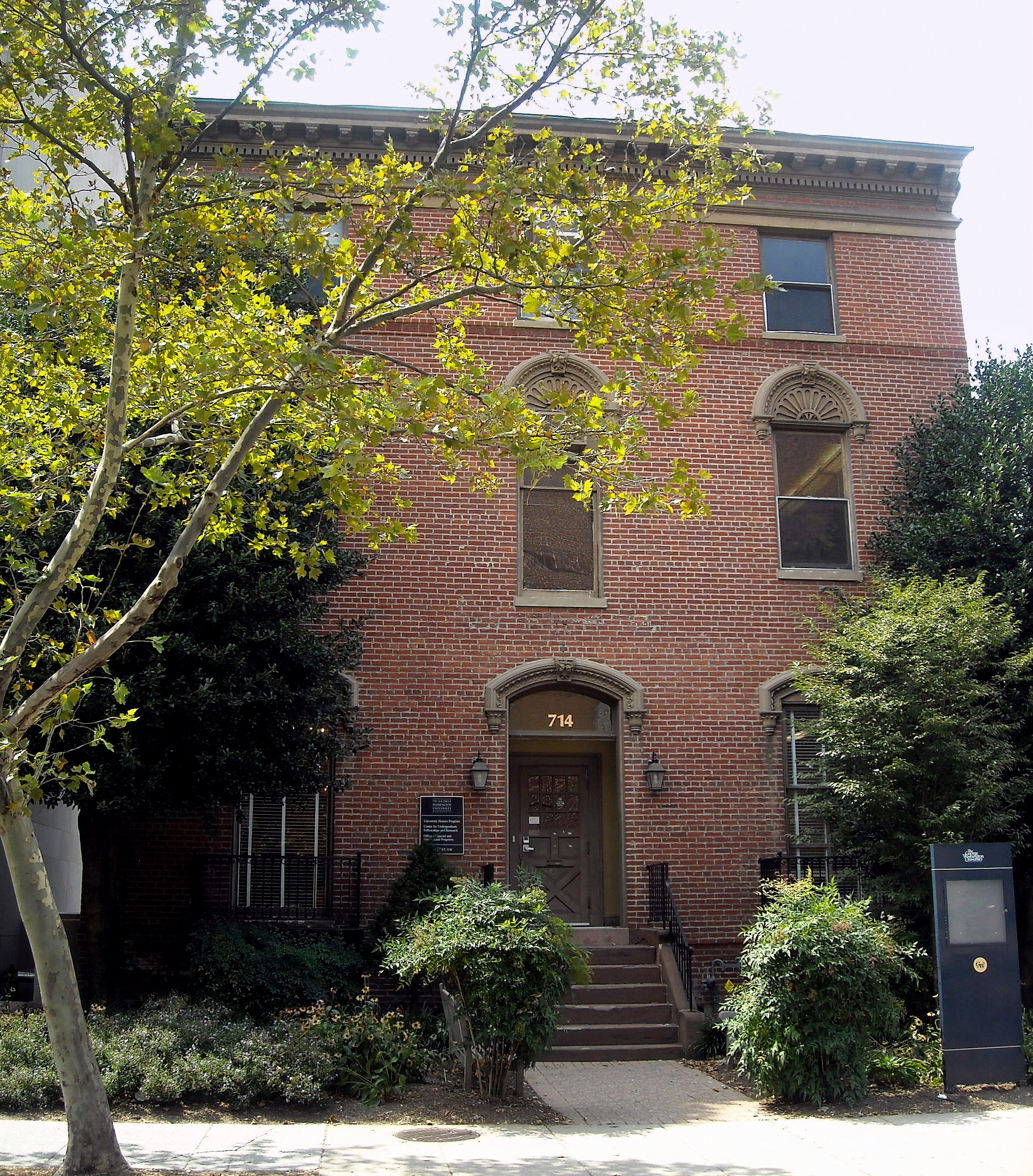

- Location within Central Washington, D.C. Location within the District of Columbia Location within the United States
- Location: 714 21st Street, N.W. Washington, D.C.
- Coordinates: 38°53′56″N 77°2′50″W
- Built: 1853
- Architectural style: Italian Villa style
- NRHP reference No.: 90001542
- Added to NRHP: October 25, 1990

Margaret Wetzel House is a historic home at 714 21st Street, Northwest, Washington, D.C., in the Foggy Bottom neighborhood.

== History ==
The house was built for Margaret Wetzel, from 1853 to 1857, in the Italian Villa style. The building was acquired by George Washington University in 1931. It served as the Faculty Club; The University Alumni office was located there from 1974 to 1999. The building has housed the University Honors Program since 2005.

The building is listed on the National Register of Historic Places and is a Washington, D.C. Landmark.
