= Eight Hundred Block of F St. NW =

- U.S. National Register of Historic Places
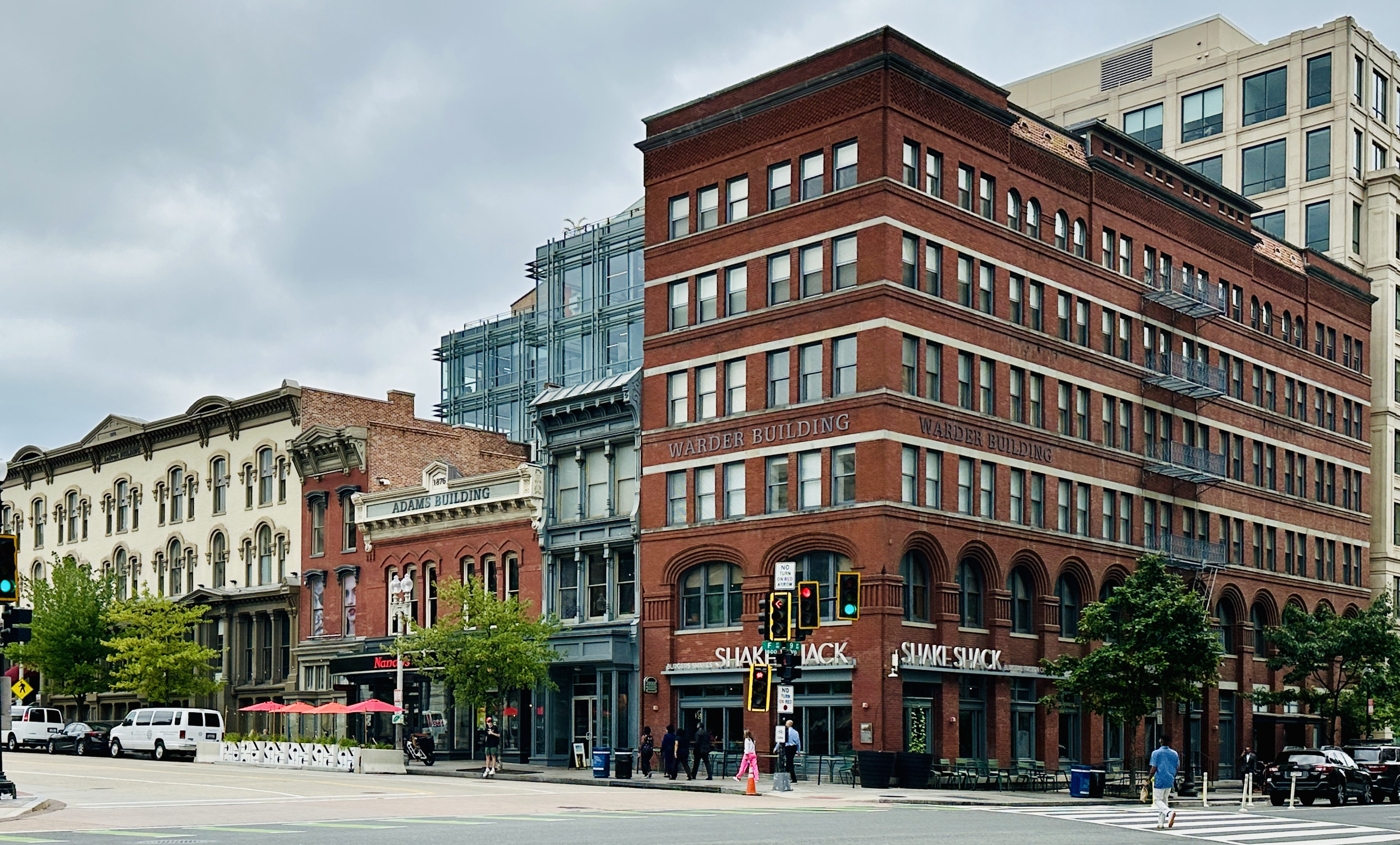
- Eight Hundred Block of F St. NW in 2026

- Location within the District of Columbia Location within the United States
- Location: 800--818 F St. and 527 9th St., NW., Washington, District of Columbia
- Coordinates: 38°53′49.7″N 77°1′24.5″W
- Area: 0.5 acres (0.20 ha)
- Built: 1875
- Architect: Multiple, including; James H. McGill; Nicholas T. Haller
- Architectural style: Italianate, Romanesque, Italianate Commercial
- NRHP reference No.: 74002159
- Added to NRHP: April 2, 1974

The Eight Hundred Block of F Street NW refers to a collection of five commercial buildings in the Penn Quarter neighborhood of Washington, DC. It formerly housed the International Spy Museum and is across the street from the Smithsonian American Art Museum. It currently houses a branch of the Shake Shack.

== Buildings ==
- 1892, Warder Building, S.E. corner of 9th and F Sts, designed by Washington architect Nicholas T. Haller, Richardsonian Romanesque style, this was a large elevator building intended for use as offices, apartments and stores.
- 1875, Le Droit Building, S.W. corner of 8th and F Sts, designed by James H. McGill, Italianate commercial style, intended exclusively for use as offices
