= Buildings at 1000 Block of Seventh Street, and 649–651 New York Avenue NW =

- U.S. National Register of Historic Places
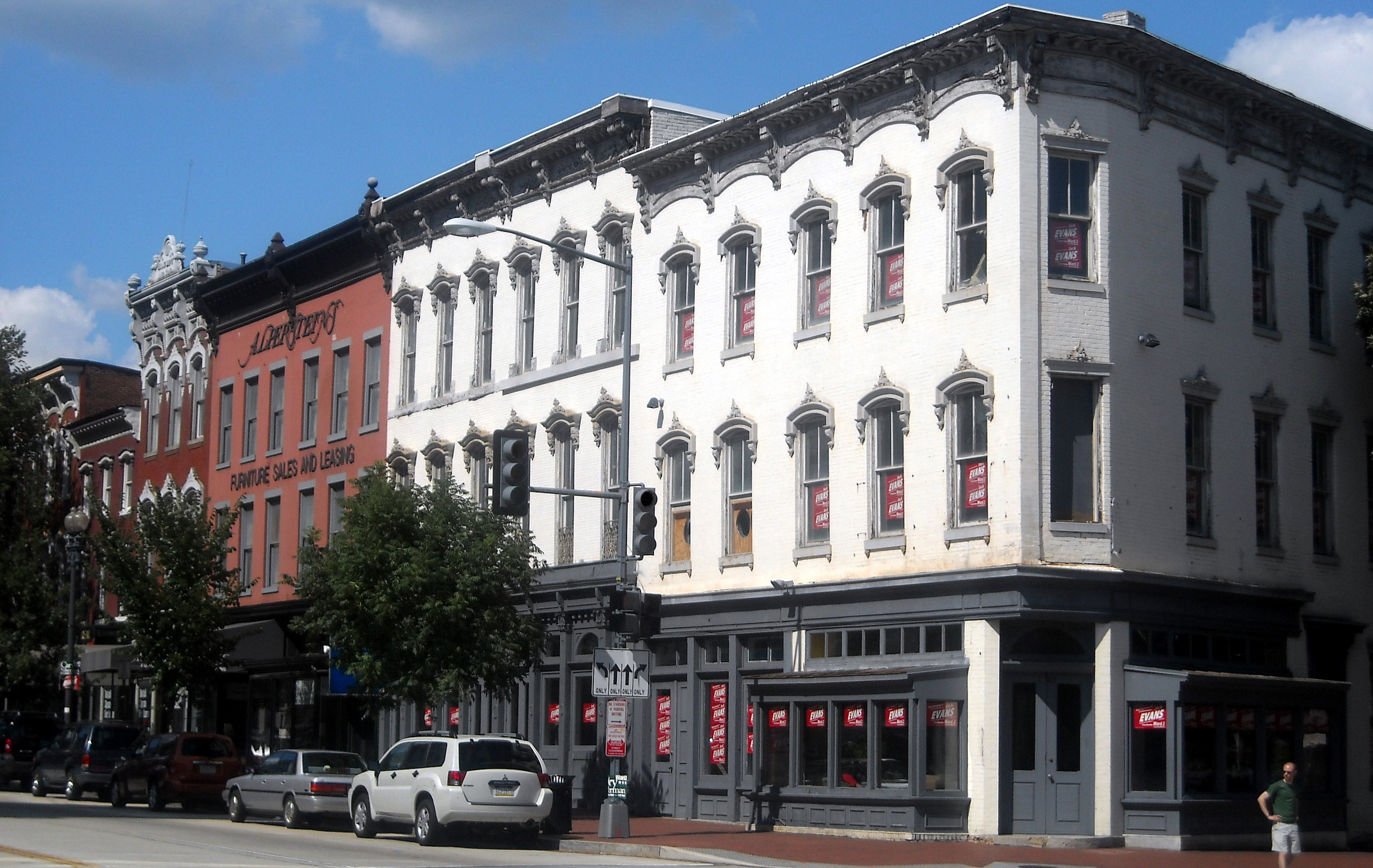
- Buildings in 2008

- Location within the District of Columbia Location within the United States
- Location: 1005–1035 7th St., and 649–651 New York Ave. NW, Washington, District of Columbia
- Coordinates: 38°54′12″N 77°1′19″W
- Area: 0.8 acres (0.32 ha)
- Architect: John G. Meyers
- Architectural style: Italianate
- NRHP reference No.: 84000861
- Added to NRHP: February 2, 1984

1000 Block of Seventh Street and 649–651 New York Avenue NW are a collection of two and three story buildings in Washington D.C. which were listed on the National Register of Historic Places in 1984. They are located across the street from the Walter E. Washington Convention Center and adjacent to Mount Vernon Square, also listed on the NRHP.

The buildings were mostly built in the 1870s for a German immigrant population. They have remained mostly intact since they were built even though the neighborhood around them has changed dramatically.
