= Craven E. Silcott =

American official during Gilded Age

Craven Edward Silcott was an American who served as the cashier to the Sergeant at Arms of the United States House of Representatives John P. Leedom. In late 1889, Silcott became the center of a political scandal when he, in his capacity managing the House of Representatives Bank, embezzled tens of thousands of dollars and disappeared with his mistress.

== History ==
The House Bank was an institution within the United States House of Representatives from the 1830s until it was abolished in 1991 following the House banking scandal. In the early years of the United States Congress, members had to physically go to the Treasury Building to receive their salaries. In the next several decades, representatives moved more of this power to the Speaker of the House, who delegated this to the Sergeant at Arms. In 1830, Speaker Andrew Stevenson created a formal office in the Capitol that representatives could go to. The Sergeant at Arms would be responsible for transferring the money from the Treasury to representatives.

The House Bank had previously seen scandal. In 1832, Sergeant at Arms John Oswald Dunn embezzled thousands of dollars from several representatives' pay before resigning on June 25, 1832. On June 26, the House voted against a plan to investigate the amount stolen and reimburse the victims with public funds by 71–97. Most Jacksonians voted against the motion with Speaker Stevenson abstaining, white most Anti-Jacksonians voted for it. On June 28, the House reversed and voted to reimburse the victims $8,668. The House Bank would continue to be plagued by problems, and questioned remained about whether the Sergeant at Arms was an authorized disbursing officer (and handling public funds) or was a private individual acting on behalf of representatives to collect their salaries.

== Background ==
Craven E. Silcott came from Ohio and became acquaintances with John P. Leedom, ultimately being hired by now Democratic Representative Leedom to serve in the House Bank when he became Sergeant at Arms. Silcott lived in Washington, D.C., with his wife and three children and made $3,000 a year. However, he had a number of vices, such as betting as well as using the services of a French-Canadian prostitute named Herminie Thiebault, also known as Louise "Lulu" Barrett.

In the 1888 House elections, the Democratic Party were defeated, including Representative Leedom. He had trusted the responsibility of the bank to Silcott, and was out of touch with how it was run, not even knowing the combination to the bank's vault. Under Leedom's nose, Silcott was living lavishly and running the bank poorly. In November 1888, Silcott began having an affair with Thiebault and paid for an apartment for her. For months before his disappearance, he also took out 35 loans from the National Metropolitan Bank, where the House Bank also held some of its funds, to cover the common practice of representatives receiving advances on their salaries. In actuality, he had forged documents and stolen the loans. Silcott's activities remained clandestine and he continued to have the confidence of Leedom. However, Leedom's term as Sergeant at Arms was due to come to an end on December 2, as would Silcott's employment in the House Bank.

== Embezzlement ==
On November 27, 29 and 30, Silcott withdrew a total of $133,442 from the Treasury to pay for representatives' salaries for December 4. He used some of it to repay the National Metropolitan Bank and deposited only $58,067 to the House Bank, for a total embezzlement of $75,375, equivalent to $2,376,396 in 2024.

On Saturday, November 30, 1889, Silcott told Leedom that he would be travelling to New York City with the explanation that he would be collecting a debt from former Representative David R. Paige of $12,000 in overdrawn checks. Silcott told his wife that he would be travelling and would return on Monday, leaving her $1,200. Silcott hastily left town with a brown suitcase and his mistress Thiebault.

== Scandal ==
On Monday, December 3, Leedom became worried when he had not heard from Silcott. On Tuesday, Leedom sent telegrams to Paige, without reply. He did the same the next morning, again to no avail. Fearing that Silcott had been murdered, Leedom discussed the issue with other House Bank employees. Bank teller Henry L. Ballentine was more suspicious, and with Leedom, they opened the vault using a combination that Silcott had written down years earlier. In the vault, much of the money was arranged to look like there was more than there was. They found the vault to be short by over $50,000, and a total of about $71,000 short after counting the money deposited with the National Metropolitan Bank early Thursday morning. Later that morning, Leedom sent a letter to Speaker Thomas Brackett Reed and news of the scandal broke in papers.

== Aftermath ==
Throughout December and in the coming months, rumors spread as to sightings of Silcott and his mistress, in places such as Hamilton, Ontario, or Montreal, Quebec. Silcott was indicted on December 20 on 112 counts in relation to his forgeries with the National Metropolitan Bank.

Congress intensely debated the issue. On Thursday, December 5, the House created a committee to investigate the House Bank. They uncovered the extent of the embezzlement, as well as overdrawn checks, of which Leedom himself was implicated in. On December 18, the committee voted to appropriate up to $75,000 to reimburse victims, but the vote failed 127–141 on the House floor, as did a tied vote to refer the matter to the Court of Claims.

Representative William H. Crain sued the government, and the Court of Claims ruled in his favor in March 1890. It also ruled that Leedom had acted as a disbursement officer, allowing Crain to be paid back with public funds. The reimbursement bill was reintroduced, and quickly passed both the House and the Senate before being signed by President Benjamin Harrison. Leedom was excoriated by the committee, and returned to Ohio before dying in 1895.

Congress voted in late 1890 on reforms to the House Bank, placing more responsibilities on the Sergeant at Arms to properly run it and to require a $50,000 bond at all times in order to cover lapses. Notably, the House Bank was not prohibited from giving advances on salaries or issuing overdrawn checks. The Sergeant at Arms would also have to submit regular balance statements to the House, Treasury, and later the General Accounting Office. In practice, these statements were taken at face value until the bank was audited for the first time in 1947.

== Subsequent scandals ==
The 1947 audit uncovered several employees having been involved in a decades long embezzlement conspiracy, with ringleader Kenneth Romney convicted and sentenced to one to three years in prison.

The House Bank would be subject to bi-annual audits by the GAO. The number of bad checks would remain unknown to the public until the events in 1991 that would lead to the Bank's abolition.
