= Christopher M. Jeffries =

American real estate developer

- Born: Christopher Michael Jeffries
- Education: Columbia University (BA); University of Michigan Law School (JD)
- Occupation: Real estate developer
- Known for: Co-founder of Millennium Partners
- Spouses: Yasmin Aga Khan (m. 1989; div. 1993): Lisa Jeffries

Christopher Michael Jeffries is an American real estate developer, lawyer, and philanthropist who co-founded the national real estate firm Millennium Partners, known for the development of the Millennium Towers in New York, Boston, and San Francisco as well as the redevelopment of Hotel St. Moritz.

== Education ==
Jeffries graduated from Columbia College in 1972 and University of Michigan Law School in 1974.

== Career ==
After receiving his J.D. degree, Jeffries began his career as a lawyer in the Southfield, Michigan, law firm of Keywell & Rosenfeld. He then served as a principal in the leveraged buyout of Key International Inc., a metal recycling and automotive equipment manufacturing business.

=== General Atlantic ===
Jeffries met Philip Aarons, who was chairing the New York City Public Development Corporation at that time and the two worked on housing developments in Staten Island. The two joined General Atlantic and ran its real estate division. Throughout the 1980s, he and Aarons constructed subsidized low-income housing in Manhattan and Brooklyn.

In April 1990, the American Broadcasting Company decided to sell two full blocks on the East Side of Broadway between Sixty-Eighth and Sixty-Ninth Streets. However, it was also a time of recession and it was difficult to get financing for almost any construction. A syndicate led by William Zeckendorf Jr. and Martin J. Raynes fell apart because they were unable to secure funding, and the latter was driven to bankruptcy in 1991 after the real estate downturn.

Jeffries then stepped in to take over the project, but his superiors at General Atlantic thought the deal was infeasible. As a result, Jeffries and Aarons departed General Atlantic and were given the right to proceed with their transaction from the company. Jeffries and Aarons, joined by Philip Lovett, started their own real estate firm, Millennium Partners, in 1990.

=== Millennium Partners ===
Millennium won the backing of Goldman Sachs and American Broadcasting Company offered them a $13 million reduction in the $105 million purchase price for the land. Eager to keep the deal alive, Jeffries came up with $1 million of his own money to secure the agreement. However, further challenges lies ahead in securing the remaining $81 million in a credit-scarce market. Jeffries came up with a novel way of financing the project by developing a mixed-used, urban entertainment, retail, office, and residential complex and pre-selling different segment of the building to various owners, both individuals and corporations. The use of the building would also be differentiated by having two separate entrances for commercial and residential uses.

By 1991, he secured financial commitments from Sony (whose space later was sold to Loews Theater), LA Fitness, Gap Inc., United States Postal Service, as well as J.P. Morgan & Co. as future tenants of Millennium Tower. Their initial success has allowed them to develop two other buildings in Lincoln Square, Manhattan, One Lincoln Square and the Grand Millennium.

The announcement of Millennium Tower brought controversies over its density, height, and design, that Brendan Gill described the 'immense structure' as 'grossly over-scaled' and objected to the 'exceptionally busy' mix of uses. Those protests later helped set new zoning laws in the district.

The Millennium Tower was, nevertheless, a commercial success that attracted celebrity tenants such as Howard Stern, Liam Neeson, Jon Bon Jovi, and Regis Philbin, earned over a quarter billion dollars and inspired other real estate developers to follow suit. According to Michael Gross, author of House of Outrageous Fortune, the children of real estate developer William Zeckendorf later used Jeffries' pioneering formula in developing 15 Central Park West as their family was investors in the Millennium Tower as well.

Jeffries later partnered with The Ritz-Carlton Hotel Company and Four Seasons Hotels and Resorts to replicate similar real estate projects that combine condominiums and hotels in mixed-used complexes in other cities, totaling $2 billion in investment. Among the cities is San Francisco, where he developed the Millennium Tower, controversial for its sinking foundations and tilting problems, and Four Seasons Hotel, San Francisco. In addition to the under construction Winthrop Center, he has helped develop Millennium Tower, Millennium Place, and owned the historic Ritz-Carlton Hotel in Boston. In Miami, he spearheaded the development of the Four Seasons Hotel Miami, which was the tallest building in the city from 2003 to 2017. In Washington, DC, he helped the development of The Ritz-Carlton, Washington, D.C. as well as The Ritz-Carlton, Georgetown.

Through Millennium Partners, he owns the Hotel St. Moritz, which he developed into The Ritz-Carlton New York, Central Park, as well as condominiums and led to a turnaround of its status, attracting prominent tenants such as Jean-Marie Messier, Sidney Kimmel, Larry Ellison, and Mitchell Rales. Jeffries' condo in the building, purchased in 2002, was the highest-priced in the New York real estate market when it was sold in 2012.

== Philanthropy ==
In 2018, Jeffries and his wife, Lisa, committed $33 million to the University of Michigan Law School, which is the largest donation the school has received. His total contribution to University of Michigan is $40 million, including $5 million for a new campus building renamed Jeffries Hall in his honor, and $2.5 million for the law school's 1L Summer Funding Program.

In March 2020, he donated $25 million to the Henry Ford Health System in Detroit, which is the largest single donation in the system's 105-year history. The money will be used to help advance cancer research and treatment.

== Personal life ==
Outside his business career, he is most known for being the former husband of Princess Yasmin Aga Khan, the daughter of actress Rita Hayworth and Prince Aly Khan, son of Aga Khan III. The couple had been active in organizations promoting research in Alzheimer's disease. They married in 1989 and their reception attracted a high-profile crowd include UN Secretary General Javier Pérez de Cuéllar, Senators Chris Dodd and Larry Pressler, author Jerzy Kosiński, songwriter Ahmet Ertegun, and Donald Trump. The couple divorced in 1993, citing abandonment.
