= The Ritz-Carlton Hotel Company =

American multinational luxury hotel chain

The Ritz-Carlton Hotel Company, LLC
- Type: Subsidiary
- Industry: Hospitality
- Founded: August 1983; 43 years ago
- Founder: William B. Johnson
- Headquarters: Bethesda, Maryland, U.S.
- Number of locations: 119 (2023)
- Number of employees: 40,000 (2017)
- Parent: Marriott International
- Website: ritzcarlton.com

The Ritz-Carlton Hotel Company, LLC is an American multinational company that operates the luxury hotel chain known as the Ritz-Carlton. The company has 108 luxury hotels and resorts in 30 countries and territories with 29,158 rooms, in addition to 46 hotels with 8,755 rooms planned for the future.

The current company was founded in 1983, when the previous owners sold the Ritz-Carlton brand name and the Ritz-Carlton hotel in Boston, Massachusetts. The brand was subsequently expanded to other locations. The company is currently a subsidiary of Marriott International.

== History ==
=== Ritz, Carlton and Ritz-Carlton in Europe ===
The story of the Ritz-Carlton brand begins with Swiss hotelier César Ritz, who was well known in the hotel industry as the "king of hoteliers and hotelier to kings." He redefined luxury accommodation in Europe with his management of the Ritz in Paris and the Carlton Hotel in London, among others. He and the chef from his hotels, Auguste Escoffier, opened à la carte restaurants known as "Ritz-Carlton" on board the Hamburg-Amerika Line ocean liners SS Amerika in 1905 and SS Imperator in 1913. The restaurants on those ships ceased operating in 1914 with the outbreak of World War I. Although Ritz died in 1918, his wife Marie continued the tradition of opening hotels in his name.

=== The Ritz-Carlton in North America ===
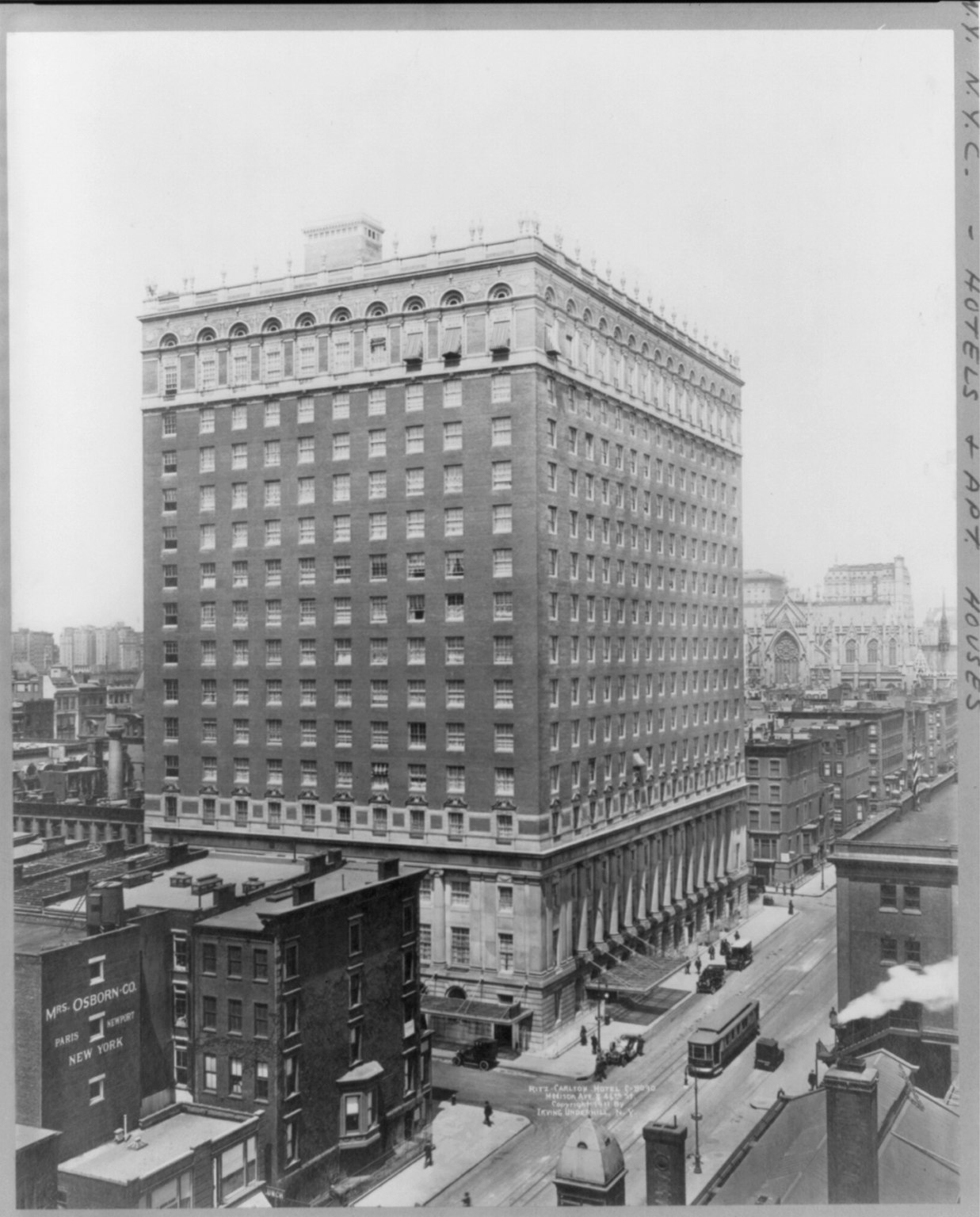
The Ritz-Carlton in New York City, 1911

The Ritz-Carlton Investing Company was established by Albert Keller, who bought and franchised the name in the United States. The first Ritz-Carlton Hotel in the U.S. opened in New York City in 1911. It was located at 46th Street and Madison Avenue. Louis Diat ran the kitchens and invented Vichyssoise there. In 1911, the Ritz company announced its intention to expand to Philadelphia and Atlantic City. The Ritz-Carlton Philadelphia followed in 1913 at Broad & Walnut streets, designed by Horace Trumbauer and Warren & Wetmore. The Ritz-Carlton Montreal opened in 1912, not owned by Keller as it was located in Canada. Keller's Ritz-Carlton Atlantic City opened in 1921.

=== The first Ritz-Carlton chain ===
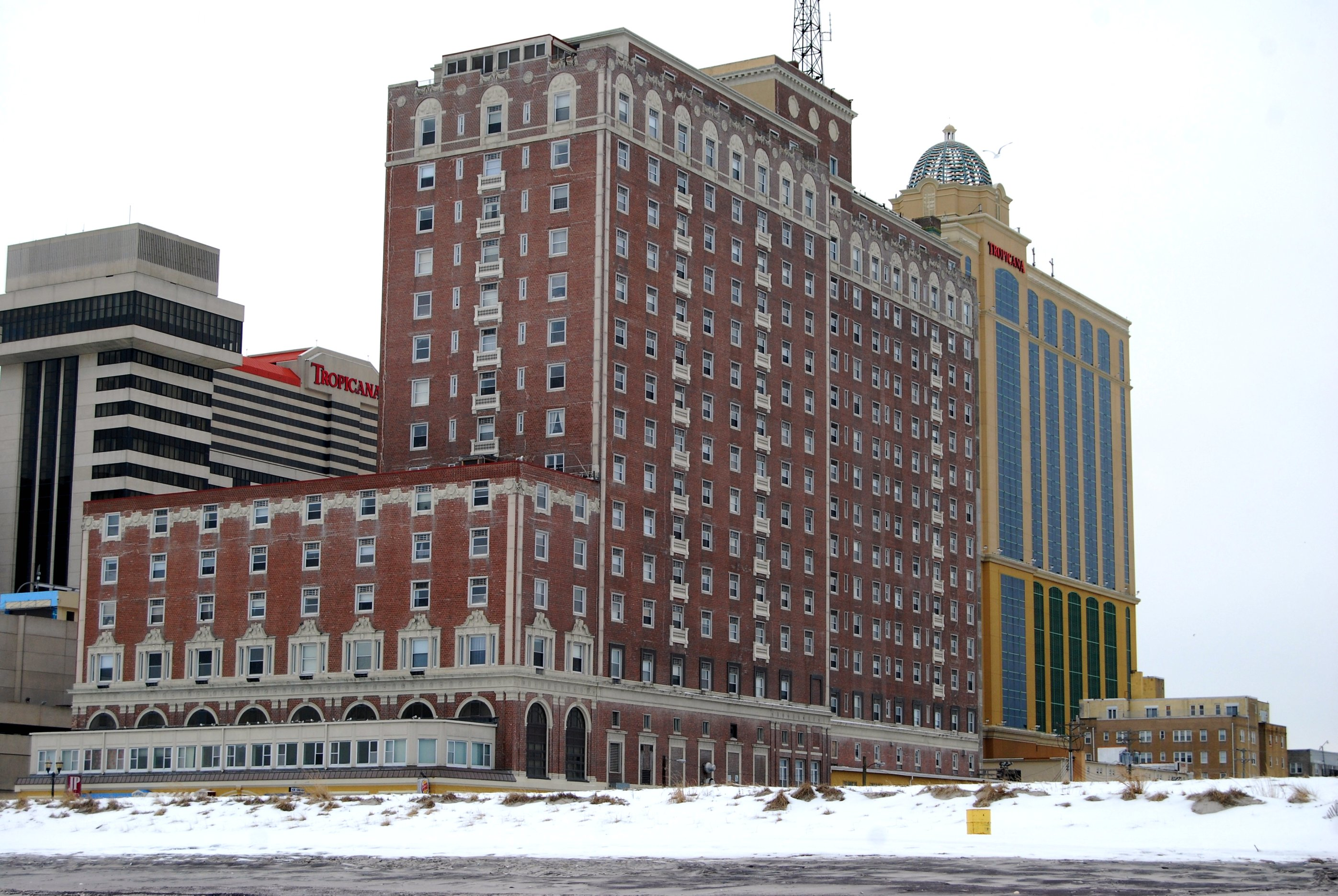
The former Ritz-Carlton Atlantic City, seen in 2011

In the early 1920s, the Ritz-Carlton chain consisted of 15 hotels:

- Plaza Hotel Buenos Aires
- Imperial Hotel, Menton
- Royal Hotel, Évian-les-Bains
- Splendide Hotel, Évian-les-Bains
- Grand Hotel Excelsior, Rome
- Grand Hotel, Rome (today the St. Regis Rome)
- Grand Hotel and New Casino, Rapallo
- Grand Hotel et des Iles Borromees, Lake Maggiore
- Excelsior Hotel, Naples
- Grand Hotel Ritz Dunapalota, Budapest
- Grand Hotel National, Lucerne
- Carlton Hotel, London
- Ritz Hotel, London
- Ritz-Carlton Hotel, New York City
- Ritz-Carlton Hotel, Atlantic City

=== The Boston hotel ===
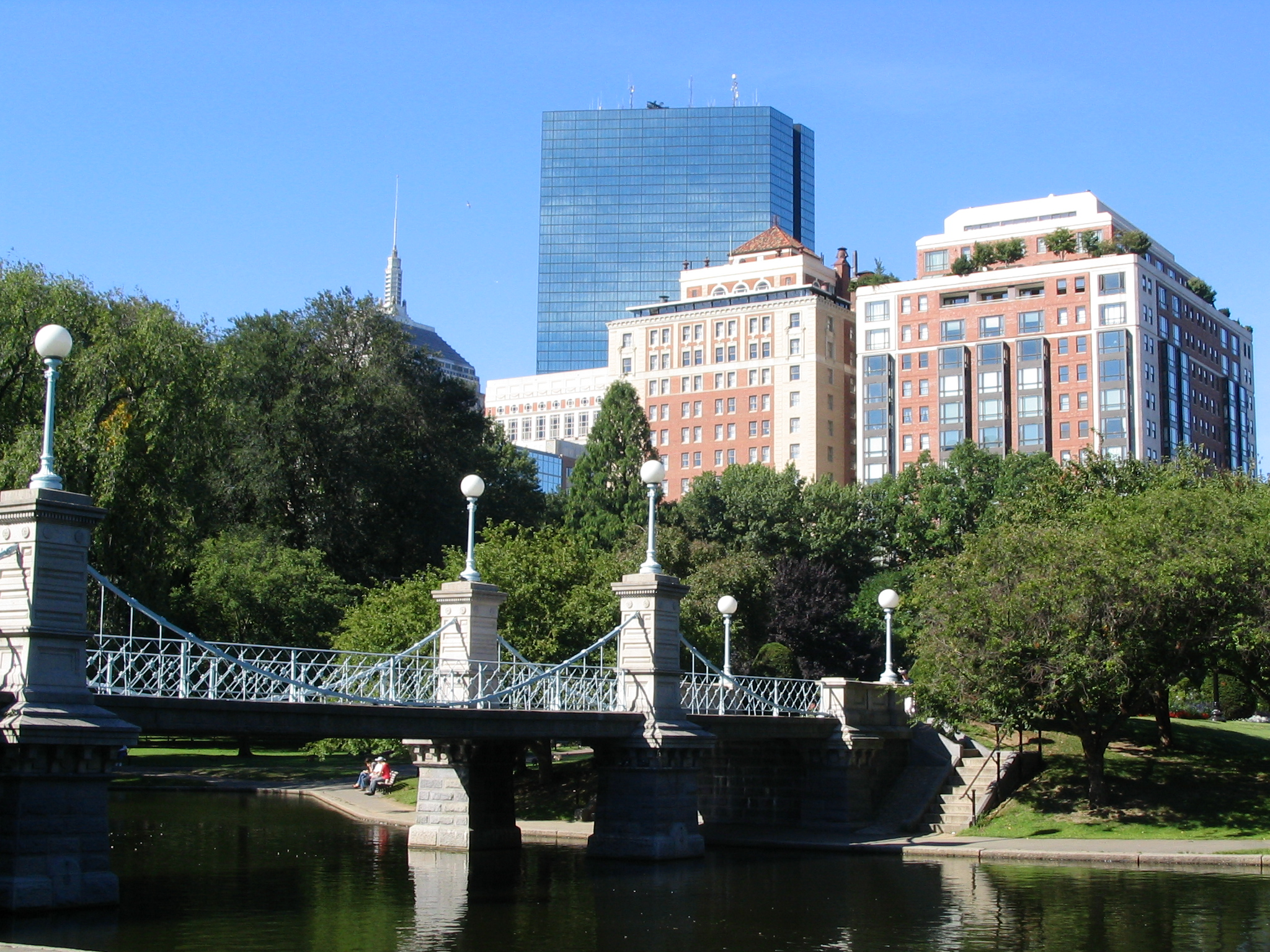
The former Ritz-Carlton in Boston, 2004

In October 1926, 29-year-old Edward N. Wyner bought a third-acre parcel at the corner of Arlington and Newbury streets and formed a partnership called the Ritz-Arlington Trust with his father, George, and business associate, John S. Slater.

The trust sold $5.8 million of bonds to finance the construction of an apartment building to be called the Mayflower. The 18-story, 201-foot (61 m) brick building, designed by Strickland, Blodget & Law Architects, was far taller than anything else along Newbury Street at the time. Construction had started on the second floor when Wyner was persuaded by then-Mayor James Michael Curley to make the Mayflower a world-class, 300-room Ritz-Carlton Hotel, which opened May 19, 1927. Room rates were $5 to $15 per night; $40 per night for suites.

After a hugely successful opening, the stock market crash of 1929 and ensuing Depression brought financial difficulties. The Wyner family funded the hotel's operating losses during the early 1930s, although the interest on the bonds went unpaid. Still in 1933, when only 30 guests were registered in the hotel, Wyner turned on the lights in every guest room to give the appearance that the hotel was full.

=== Decline of the first Ritz-Carlton chain ===
The Philadelphia location was converted to an office building after only a few years in operation. The Atlantic City hotel was sold to Schine Hotels in the late 1940s, and later to Sheraton Hotels in 1959. The New York hotel was demolished in 1951, leaving only the Boston location. Edward Wyner died of a heart attack on December 5, 1961. His six sons tried to continue the operation of the Boston hotel, but were unable to overcome difficulties, and decided to sell.

=== The Blakeley years: 1964–1983 ===
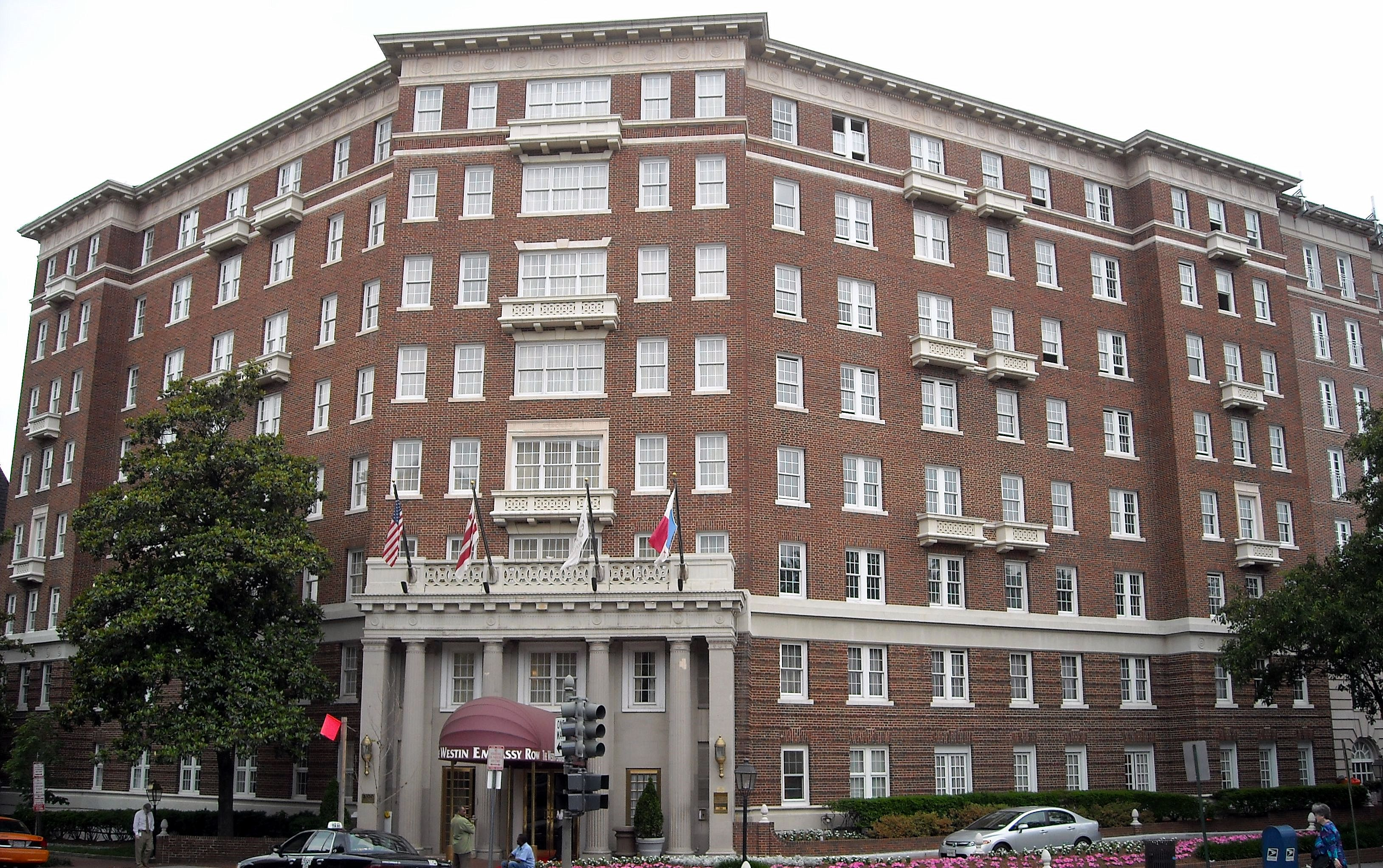
The former Ritz-Carlton Washington, D.C., 2004

The unpaid interest on the bonds dissuaded many from trying to buy the hotel. But Cabot, Cabot & Forbes principal Gerald F. Blakeley Jr. was interested. After more than a year of legal work, Hale and Dorr succeeded at clearing the bond obligations, and in October 1964 Blakeley and associates Paul Hellmuth and Charles Spaulding acquired the Ritz-Carlton Boston for $5.8 million.

"Out of the 20 years I owned it, it made money three years. The other years it broke even, but from a public relations standpoint for CC&F, it was a tremendous asset," said Blakeley, who constructed a 19-story addition to the hotel in 1981, which included more function space, 80 more guest rooms, and 52 condominiums.

In the late 1960s Blakeley obtained the rights to the Ritz-Carlton name in North America (with the exception of Montreal and New York). In June 1978, Blakeley was awarded the rights and privileges of the Ritz-Carlton trademark in the United States and was given a US Service Mark Registration.

In the 1970s, the Ritz-Carlton name was licensed to the builders of a new hotel in Chicago. The Ritz-Carlton Chicago opened in 1975 in a tower atop Water Tower Place. It joined the Four Seasons Hotels & Resorts chain in 1977, as there was no Ritz-Carlton chain at the time. Confusingly, it remained part of Four Seasons for decades, marketed as "the Ritz-Carlton Chicago (A Four Seasons Hotel)". It had no association with the modern Ritz-Carlton chain, though it used the name and the iconic logo. The property was sold in 2013 and left Four Seasons, joining the modern Ritz-Carlton chain as a franchise on August 1, 2015.

In 1982, Blakely licensed the name to hotelier John B. Coleman for two hotels he was renovating, The Fairfax in Washington, D.C., and the Navarro in New York City. Coleman renamed them the Ritz-Carlton Washington, D.C., and the Ritz-Carlton New York in April 1982. Coleman paid Blakely a fee of 1.5 percent of each hotel's annual gross revenue for use of the name. The two hotels eventually joined the modern chain that would be founded a few years later.

== Current company ==
In August 1983, Blakeley sold the Ritz-Carlton Boston and the US trademark for $75.5 million to William B. Johnson, a major Waffle House franchisee who was once the largest owner. He assembled a four-person development team in Atlanta, headed by hotelier Horst Schulze, to create the Ritz-Carlton hotel brand and established the Ritz-Carlton Hotel Company in its current form.

In 1988, Johnson subsequently obtained the exclusive rights to the Ritz-Carlton brand name throughout the world except for the Hôtel Ritz Paris, the Ritz-Carlton, Chicago, and the Ritz-Carlton Montreal. Unlike the Ritz-Carlton, Chicago and the Ritz-Carlton Montreal, Hôtel Ritz Paris is not associated with the Ritz-Carlton Hotel Company, instead joining the Leading Hotels of the World. In 2015, the Ritz-Carlton, Chicago is no longer part of Four Seasons, and eventually became part of the Ritz-Carlton Hotel Company.

=== The corporate years: 1983–1999 ===
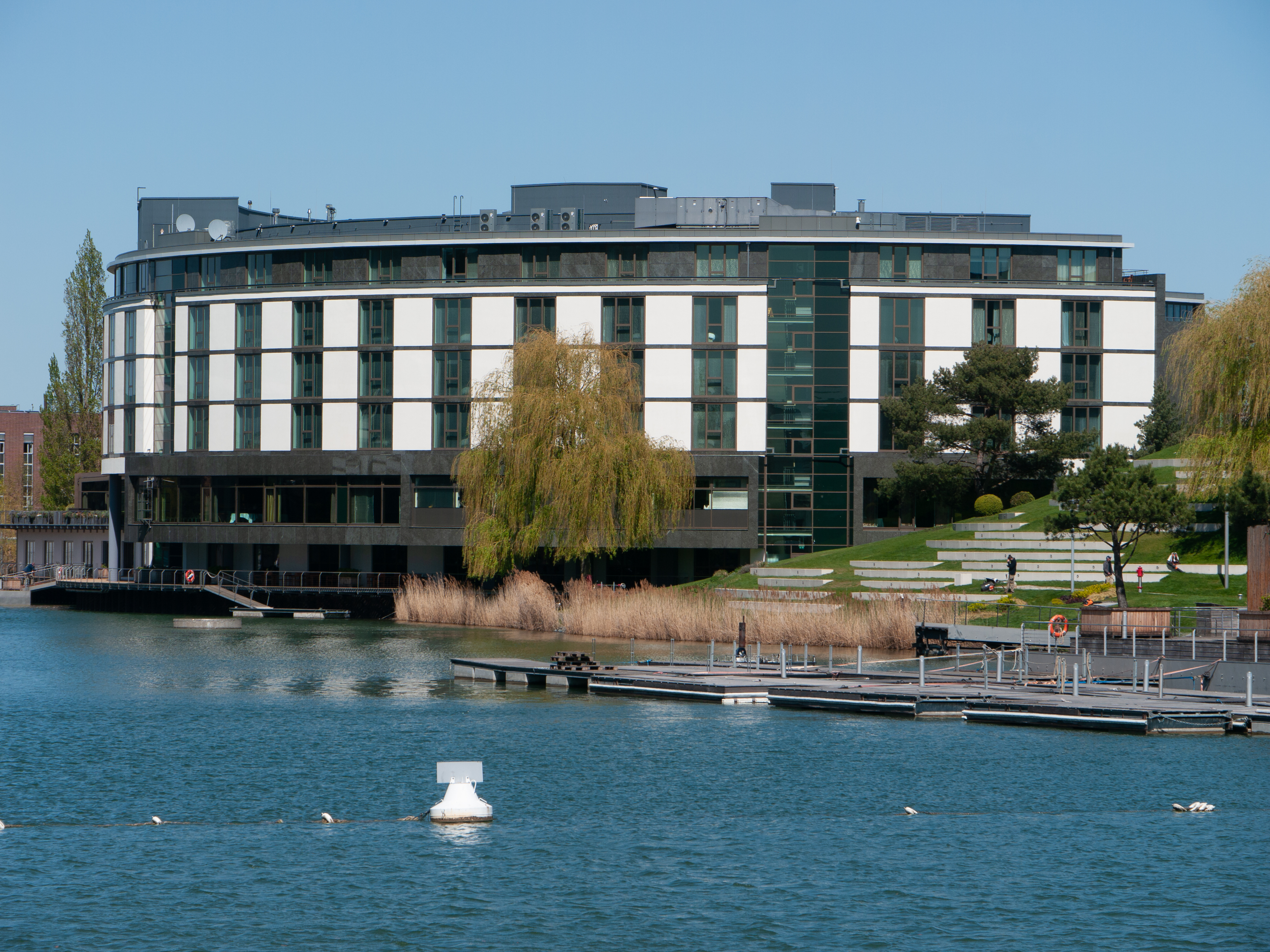
The Ritz-Carlton at the Autostadt in Wolfsburg, Germany: completed in 2000, it was the first hotel of the company to open in Europe.

From 1951 to 1975, the Ritz-Carlton Boston had been one of only two Ritz-Carlton hotels in the US. The other was the independently owned Ritz-Carlton Atlantic City which had since been converted to condominiums. Johnson's company paid the Atlantic City establishment to abandon its name and rename itself the Ritz Condominiums.

Johnson would later enlarge the company from just the Boston property to 30 hotels worldwide in just 10 years. He obtained financing to do so from Manufacturers Hanover Trust of New York in 1983 in the amount of $85 million secured by the Ritz-Carlton Boston. This loan was refinanced in 1989 by Manhattan Tops USA of New York for $136.5 million and again in 1994 by the Sumitomo Bank of Japan. By 1996, this mortgage was in default and the interest and penalties brought the total debt to $214.8 million. By splitting this mortgage note into three parts, Sumitomo Bank was able to unbundle the Ritz-Carlton Boston from the trademark rights to the Ritz-Carlton brand worldwide.

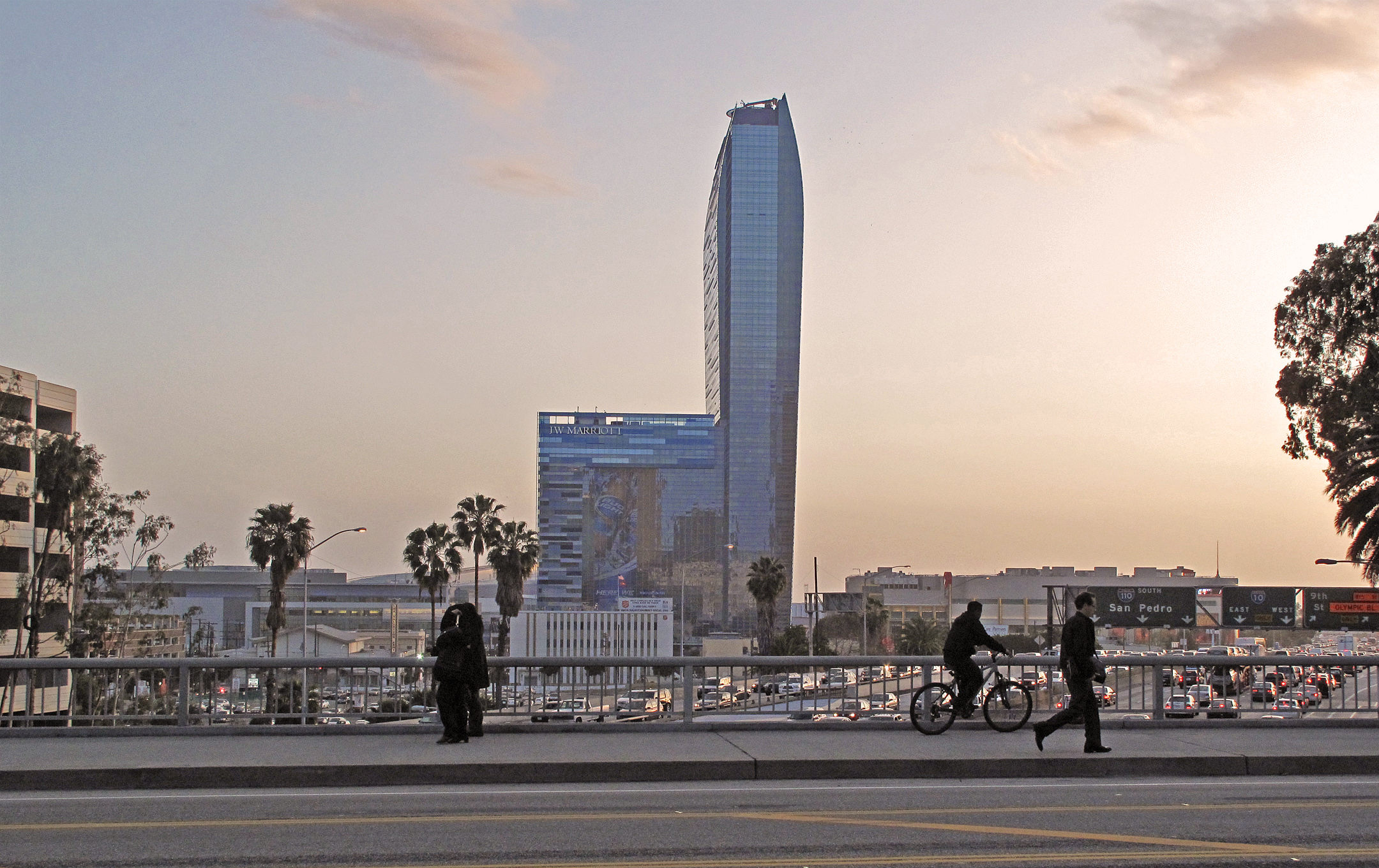
Ritz-Carlton hotel in Los Angeles

In March 1995, Marriott International, which franchised and managed over 325,000 rooms, bought a 49% stake in the Ritz-Carlton Hotel Company. Blackstone Real Estate Acquisitions bought the Ritz-Carlton Boston at auction for $75 million in February 1998. A month later, Marriott International acquired the hotel from Blackstone for $100 million.

In April 1998, Marriott International purchased an additional 50% stake in the Ritz-Carlton Hotel Company from Johnson for $290 million, giving Marriott 99% ownership of the company and rights to the Ritz-Carlton hotel chain worldwide. Schulze and other executives (including Leonardo Inghilleri, Robert A. Warman and Peter Schoch) left to form the West Paces Hotel Group, which took the name of its primary brand, Capella Hotels, in December 2011. In 2007, the partners also formed Solís Hotels.

=== Disposal of the historic Boston property ===
In 1998, Christopher Jeffries, founding partner of Millennium Partners, obtained the Ritz-Carlton franchises from Marriott for four hotel properties under construction: two in Washington, one in New York City, and one in Atlanta, Georgia. In addition, Jeffries was searching for a brand affiliation for the new 155-room hotel and 270-luxury condominiums he was constructing as part of Boston's 1,800,000-square-foot (170,000 m^{2}) Millennium Place, a mixed-use complex on lower Washington Street. Due to non-competition clauses, the only way he could obtain a second Ritz-Carlton flag in Boston was to own the existing Ritz-Carlton.

Millennium Partners acquired the original Ritz-Carlton Boston for $122 million (though it had sold for just $75 million less than two years prior) and spent $50 million for renovations. Marriott agreed to allow the Ritz-Carlton affiliation for the condominium complex, known as the Residences at the Ritz-Carlton, sharing all of the services of the hotel.

From 2001 to 2007, Boston was home to two Ritz-Carlton hotels that faced each other across Boston Common. The Ritz-Carlton, Boston Common opened in 2001.

In November 2006, Taj Hotels, a subsidiary of the India-based Tata Group, purchased the Ritz-Carlton Boston from its owners, Millennium Partners for $170 million. The Ritz-Carlton Boston became the Taj Boston on January 11, 2007.

=== Development since 2010 ===
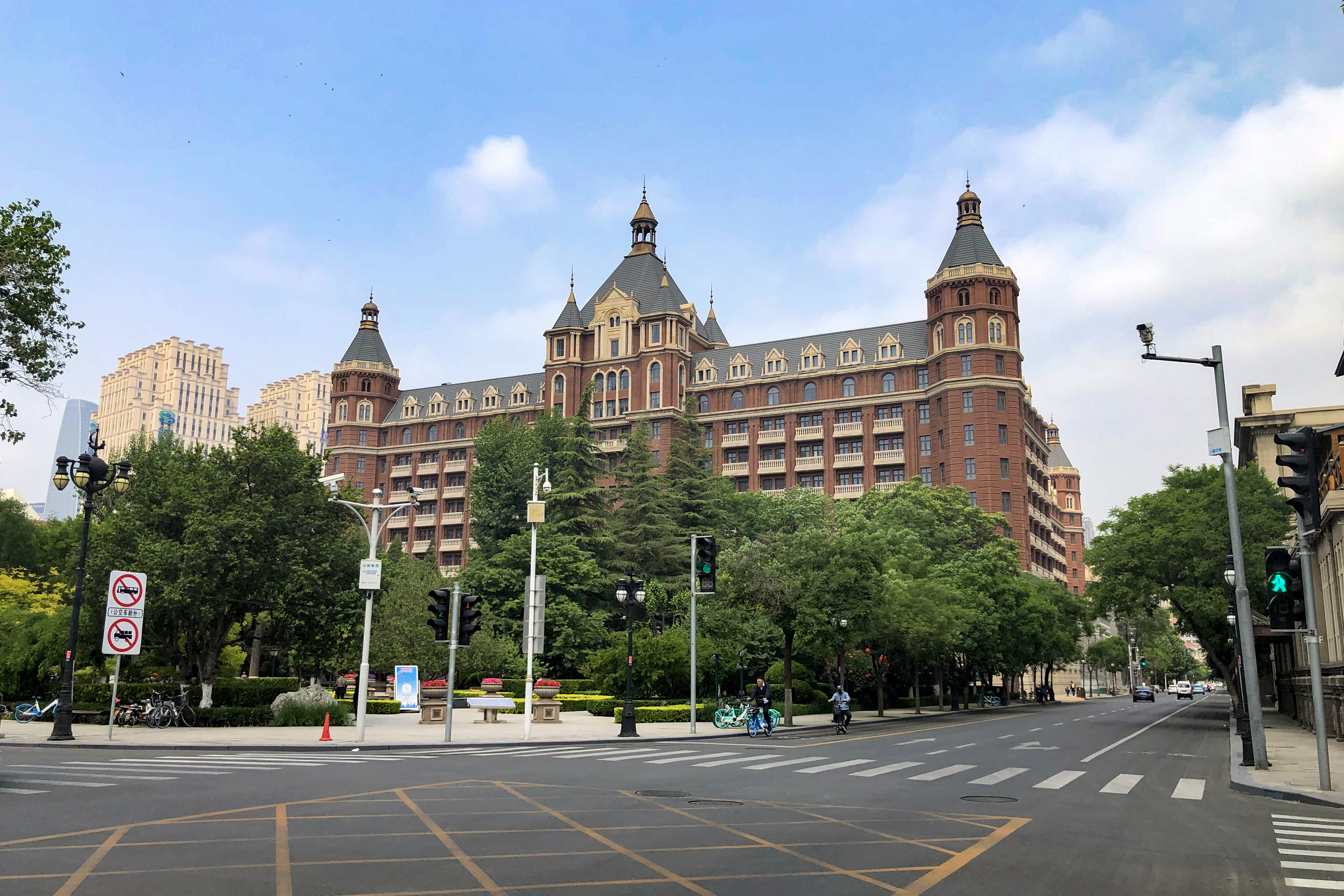
Ritz-Carlton, Tianjin

The company grew under the leadership of President and COO Horst Schulze. Schulze instituted a company-wide concentration on both the personal and the data-driven sides of service: He coined the company's well-known customer/employee-centered motto, "We are Ladies and Gentlemen Serving Ladies and Gentlemen" and the set of specific service values (standards) on which the Ritz-Carlton employees base service through the present day. Under his leadership the hotels earned an unprecedented two Malcolm Baldrige National Quality Awards and grew from four to forty U.S. locations.

During this time, the Ritz-Carlton also became known for its influence on service in a wide range of industries, through the creation of the Ritz-Carlton Learning Institute and the Ritz-Carlton Leadership Center, created by then-Ritz executive Leonardo Inghilleri, who was an architect of the Ritz's second Baldrige award, where executives from other companies worldwide in many disciplines come to learn the Ritz-Carlton principles of service.

The Ritz-Carlton Hotel Company claims it is headquartered in Chevy Chase, Maryland, though the headquarters address is the Marriott address in Bethesda, Maryland, located in the Washington, D.C., MSA.

The Ritz-Carlton Hotel Company partnered with Bulgari in 2001 to operate a chain of hotels owned by and operated under the BVLGARI brand. The company currently has marketing agreements with Bulgari Hotels & Resorts, the Cosmopolitan of Las Vegas, the privately owned Ritz-Carlton Montreal and the Ritz Hotel London.

Simon Cooper joined Ritz-Carlton in 2001 as president and chief operating officer, taking the helm from Horst Schulze. Cooper's mandate was to grow the chain through hotel expansion and product diversification. Under Cooper's watch the company has aggressively expanded its hotels and added the Ritz-Carlton Residences, private residential units, and the Ritz-Carlton Destination Club, fractional ownership residences, to the company's development program.

August 12, 2010, Ritz-Carlton announced its new president and Chief Operations Officer would be Herve Humler, one of the founders of the 1983 company, who will be responsible for leading brand operations and global growth strategy.

In October 2011, Angella Reid, the General Manager of the Ritz-Carlton Hotel in Pentagon City, Virginia was appointed as White House Chief Usher, becoming the first woman to serve in that post.

In 2020, a Forbes article discussing how luxury brands collaborate to attract luxury buyers mentioned that Asprey and Ritz Carlton partnered for their 'purple water beauty amenities,' which includes body lotions and shampoos within the hotel rooms.

== Properties ==
The Ritz-Carlton currently operates a total of 115 properties, with 44 in the United States and Canada, 38 in Asia and the Pacific, 14 in the Middle East and Africa, 11 in Europe, and 8 in the Caribbean and Latin America.

=== Notable properties ===
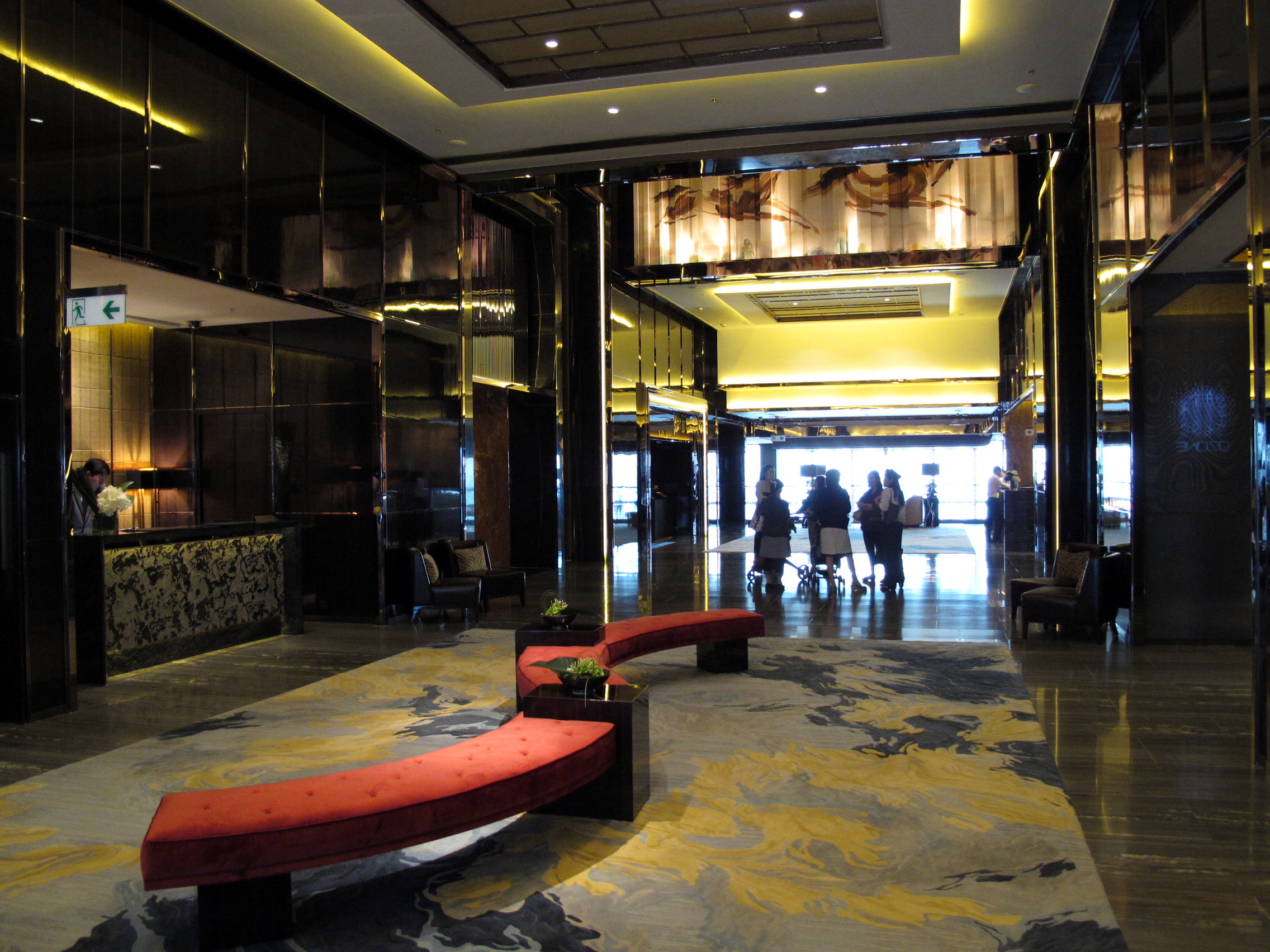
Lobby on 103rd floor at the Ritz-Carlton, Hong Kong

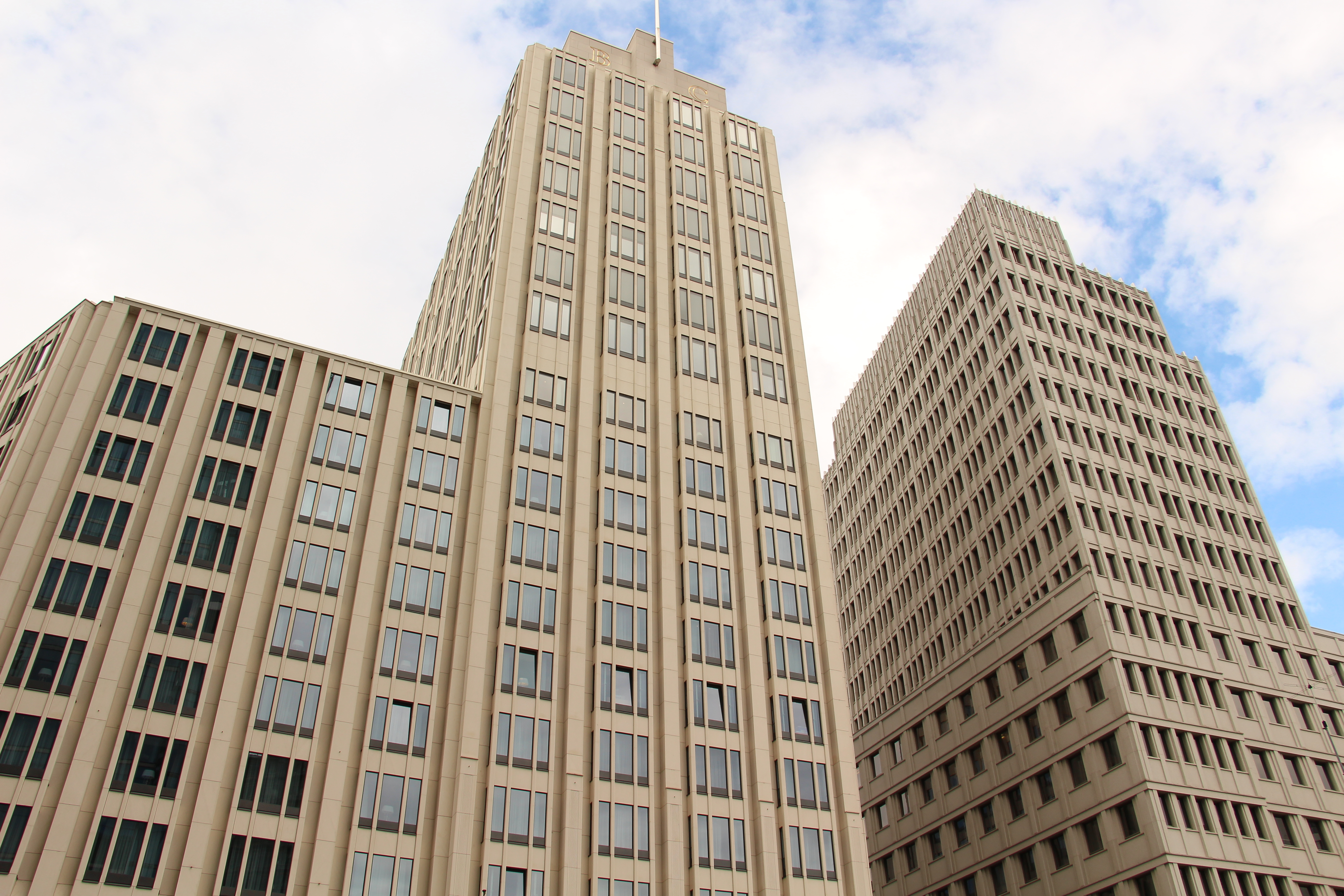
The Ritz-Carlton Berlin

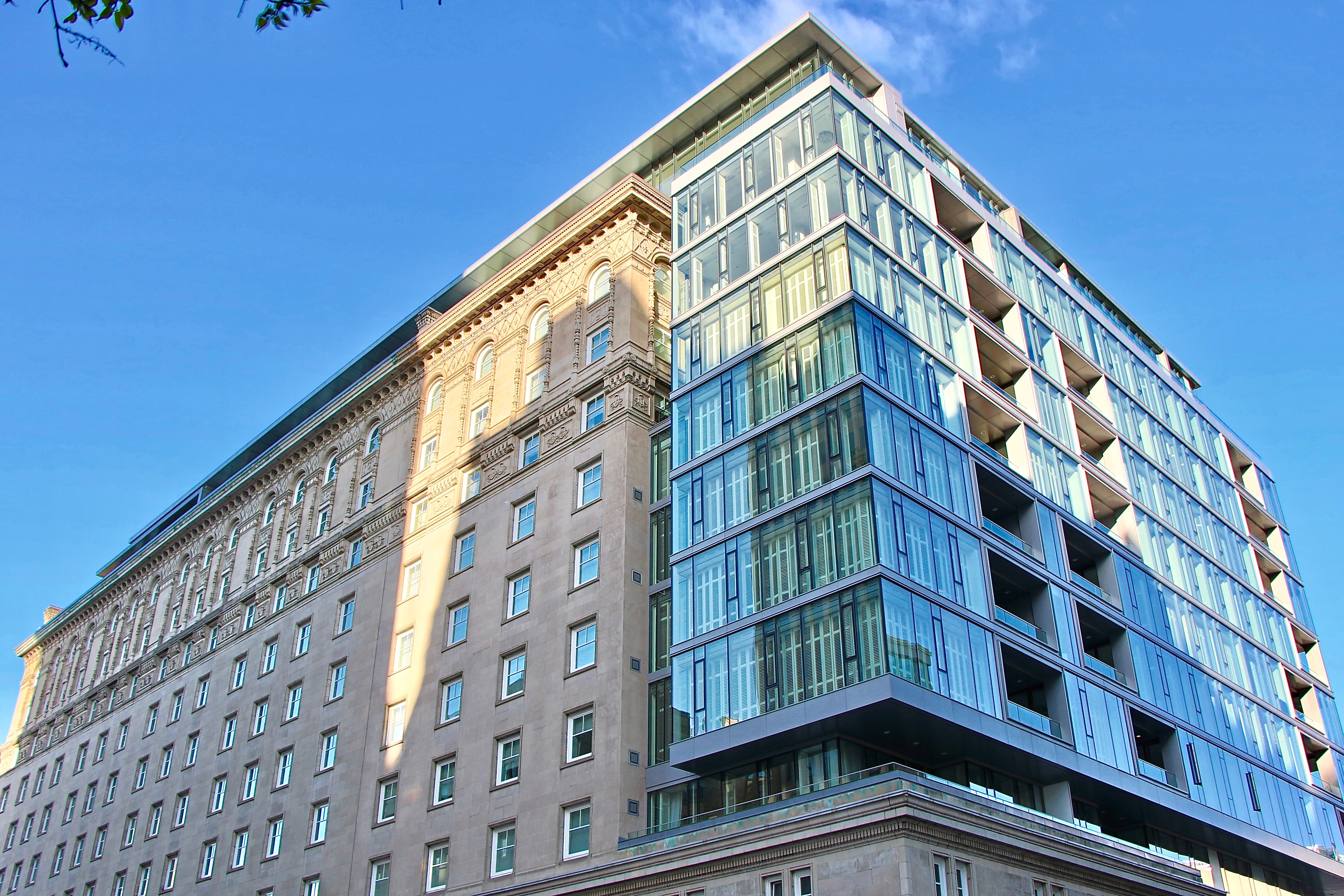
The Ritz-Carlton Montreal

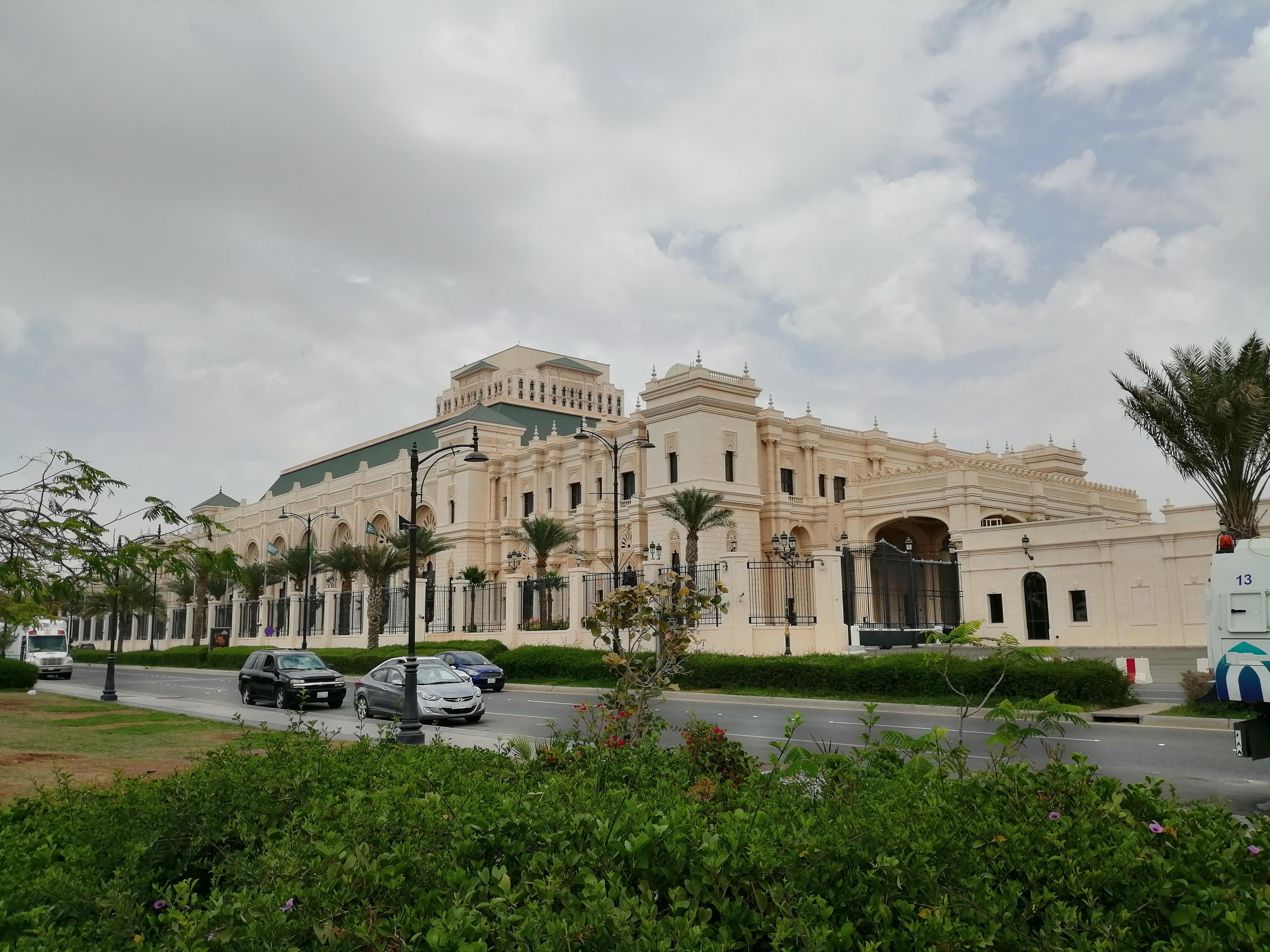
The Ritz-Carlton Jeddah

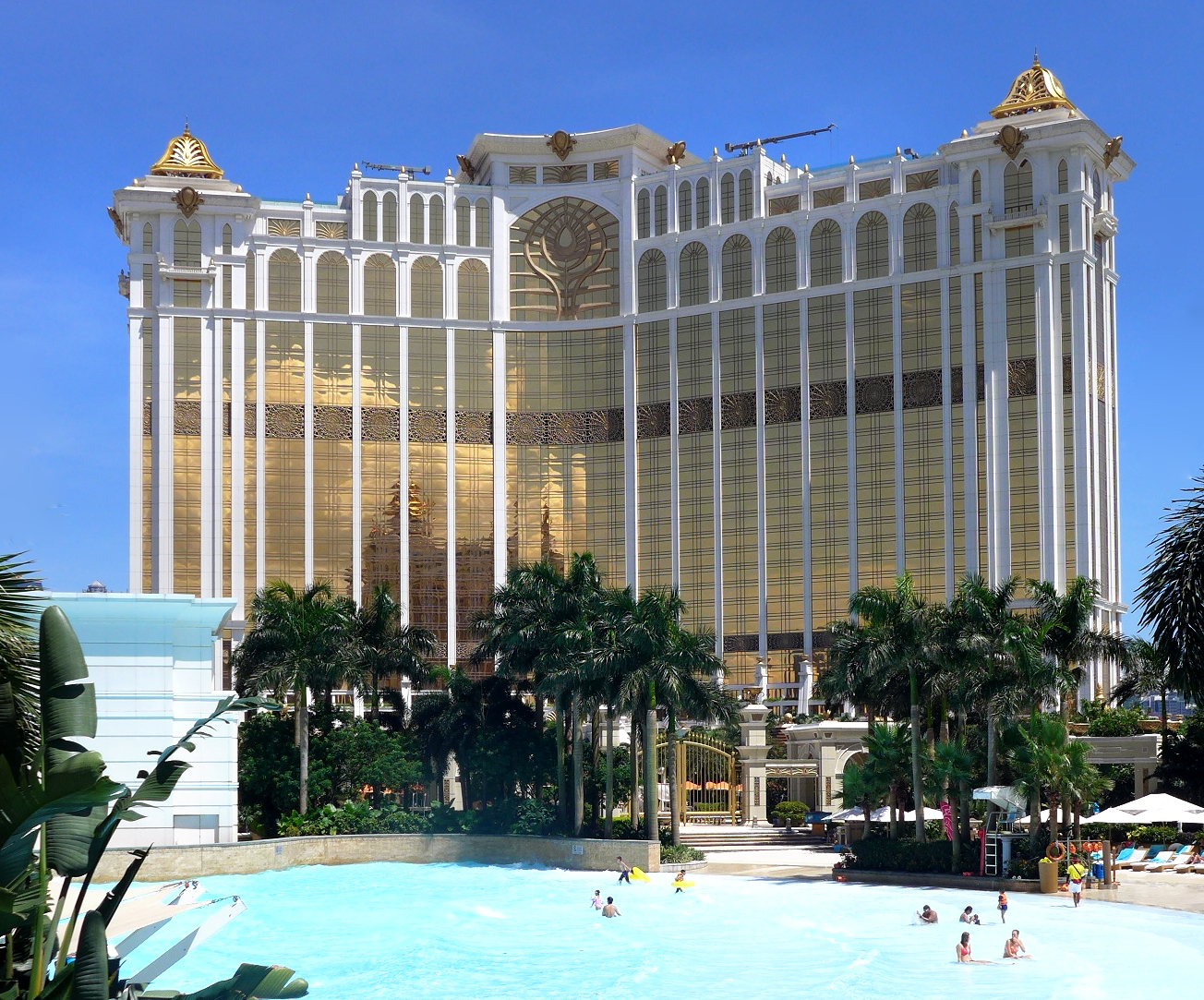
The Ritz-Carlton Macau

- The Ritz-Carlton Kuala Lumpur, in Malaysia's capital city, opened in 1997. It is the only 'all butler hotel' operating in the city, offering butler service to all of its 300+ rooms and suites and has since been ranked among the "Gold List" of hotels by Condé Nast, ranked as "one of the top five butler hotels" by The Independent and regarded by Travel and Leisure as one of "The World's Greatest Hotels".
- In 1999, Ritz-Carlton acquired the former Hotel St. Moritz in New York City, re-establishing a presence for the brand in New York City for the first time since the former Ritz-Carlton New York left the Ritz-Carlton stable in 1997 (it later became a Westin, then an InterContinental, then condominiums).
- On Friday, July 17, 2009, at 7:47 a.m. Jakarta time, a bomb exploded in the Ritz-Carlton Mega Kuningan, Jakarta, Indonesia destroying the first floor of the hotel. The explosion occurred 2 minutes after the explosion at the nearby JW Marriott Jakarta. The hotel was scheduled to host the Manchester United football club the following Monday during the Indonesia leg of its Asia tour, but the visit was canceled due to the bombing. Nine people including 2 suicide bombers were killed.
- On December 22, 2009, the Ritz-Carlton opened its first "Reserve" property, Phulay Bay, in Krabi, Thailand. Since then, six more properties with Reserve branding have opened: Dorado Beach in Puerto Rico (2012), Mandapa in Bali (2015), Zadún in Los Cabos (2019), Higashiyama Niseko in Niseko (2020), Rissai Valley in Jiuzhaigou (2023), and Nujuma in The Red Sea Project (2024). The Ritz-Carlton Reserve properties are distinctive resorts built in exotic places, and are some of the most exclusive within the company, with the number of available rooms in each property ranging from 50 to 113. Until April 14, 2022, the Ritz-Carlton Reserves did not participate in the Marriott Bonvoy loyalty program, meaning guests could neither redeem nor earn points there.
- The Ritz-Carlton and JW Marriott Hotels at L.A. Live opened February 2010 and share the first skyscraper built since the early 1990s in Downtown Los Angeles. The Ritz-Carlton, Los Angeles was awarded a LEED silver certification.
- On March 29, 2011, the Ritz-Carlton opened the highest hotel in the world, the Ritz-Carlton, Hong Kong on floors 102-118 of the International Commerce Centre in Tsim Sha Tsui on Kowloon Peninsula, Hong Kong. The lobby is 425 m (1,394 ft) above the ground. Asian Headquarters of Morgan Stanley, Credit Suisse, and Deutsche Bank are also located in the same 118-story building.
- On August 26, 2013, members of the Filipino diaspora protested at the Ritz-Carlton, Los Angeles and JW Marriott Hotels at L.A. Live against the Priority Development Assistance Fund scam. It is believed that the family of the alleged mastermind of the scam Janet Lim-Napoles owned a condominium unit in the building said to be worth $2 million.
- On November 4, 2013, the Ritz-Carlton Kazakhstan opened in Almaty. The 145-room hotel sits on the top floors of the Esentai Tower, the tallest building in Central Asia.
- In January 2014, Ritz-Carlton opened a hotel in Herzliya, Israel featuring a spa and the brand's first kosher restaurant.
- In May 2017, Ritz-Carlton opened a hotel in Jeddah, Saudi Arabia, the hotel was also opened as a conference hall making it one of the largest conference halls in Jeddah. The hotel is located in Al-Hamra district, a place famous for its luxury hotels and nearness to the Corniche.
- In 2015 Ritz-Carlton reopened Nile Ritz Carlto, It was originally the Hilton Nile Hotel before being rebranded and reopened as a Ritz-Carlton after extensive renovations.
- Mexico City, Mexico: Ritz-Carlton Mexico City - Opened in 2021, offers exclusive views of Chapultepec Park, the largest urban park in Mexico.

=== Former properties ===
==== Asia ====
- Jimbaran, Bali, Indonesia: the Ritz-Carlton Bali, Resort & Spa – Opened on November 29, 1996, as the first Ritz-Carlton resort in Asia, management terminated on March 31, 2009. Property reopened on April 1, 2009, as Ayana Resort & Spa Bali, with sister hotels also opened within the 90-hectare integrated resort such as Rimba Jimbaran – Bali (opened 2013), the Villas at Ayana Resort Bali, and Ayana Residences Bali. The name "the Ritz-Carlton Bali" currently refers to another resort opened on February 2, 2015, in Nusa Dua, located on the opposite side of the South Kuta area (not to be confused with Mandapa, a Ritz-Carlton Reserve property also opened in 2015 in Ubud).
- Gangnam, Seoul, South Korea: Renovated and reopened as the Le Méridien Seoul in 2017.

==== Europe ====
- Enniskerry, Ireland: Ritz-Carlton Powerscourt Hotel: Management terminated October 1, 2013.
- The Ritz-Carlton Moscow, the first Ritz-Carlton Hotel in Russia opened July 1, 2007, on Tverskaya Street. The Ritz-Carlton Suite, billed at US$13,715 per night, is listed at number 13 on World's 15 most expensive hotel suites compiled by CNN in 2012. Management terminated July 2022 following sanctions due to Russo-Ukrainian War.

==== North America ====
- Atlanta, Georgia: Buckhead Ritz-Carlton – reopened as the Whitley December 2017
- Aspen, Colorado: Ritz-Carlton Aspen – Management terminated August 2, 1997
- Cancún, Mexico: Ritz-Carlton Cancún – 1993 and rebranded as Kempinski on September 1, 2022
- Dearborn, Michigan: Ritz-Carlton Dearborn – Management terminated June 2, 2010
- Houston, Texas: Ritz-Carlton Houston – Management terminated August 2, 1997
- Lake Las Vegas Ritz-Carlton: Opened 2003; closed May 2, 2010
- Montego Bay, Jamaica: Ritz-Carlton Rose Hall – Management terminated July 2013
- Palm Beach, Florida: Ritz-Carlton Palm Beach – Management terminated July 1, 2013
- Pasadena, California: Ritz-Carlton Huntington – Opened 1991; management terminated January 2008
- Phoenix, Arizona: Ritz-Carlton Phoenix – Opened 1988; management contract ended July 24, 2015
- Washington, District of Columbia: Ritz-Carlton Washington D.C. – Management terminated August 2, 1997
- White Plains, New York: the Ritz-Carlton New York, Westchester – Opened December 2008 Management Terminated September 2020

==== Australia ====
- Sydney Ritz-Carlton Double Bay: management terminated 2001

== Accommodations ==
=== Historical ===
		US	Non-US	Total
2007	Properties	36	34	70
2007	Rooms	11,627	9,978	21,605
2008	Properties	37	33	70
2008	Rooms	11,629	10,204	21,833
2009	Properties	40	34	74
2009	Rooms	12,115	10,171	22,286
2010	Properties	39	35	74
2010	Rooms	11,587	10,457	22,044
2011	Properties	39	39	78
2011	Rooms	11,587	11,996	23,583
2012	Properties	38	42	80
2012	Rooms	11,357	12,410	23,767
2013	Properties	37	47	84
2013	Rooms	11,040	13,950	24,990
2014	Properties	39	48	87
2014	Rooms	11,424	14,090	25,514

=== From 2015 ===
		North America	Europe	Middle E. & Africa	Asia & Pacific	Caribbean Latin Am.	Total
2015	Properties	40	12	10	27	7	96
2015	Rooms	11,839	2,929	3,166	7,231	1,966	27,131
2016	Properties	40	12	12	27	7	98
2016	Rooms	11,839	2,925	3,835	6,998	1,966	27,563
2017	Properties	40	13	12	30	7	102
2017	Rooms	11,685	3,081	3,835	7,502	1,966	28,069
2018	Properties	39	13	13	30	6	101
2018	Rooms	11,398	3,079	3,867	7,520	1,786	27,650
2019	Properties	39	13	13	33	8	106
2019	Rooms	11,410	3,079	3,523	8,207	2,081	28,300
2020	Properties	39	13	13	36	8	109
2020	Rooms	11,833	3,080	3,523	8,754	2,081	29,271
2021	Properties	39	12	14	38	10	113
2021	Rooms	11,839	2,835	3,763	9,222	2,372	30,031
2022	Properties	41	12	15	38	9	115
2022	Rooms	12,508	2,689	3,988	9,192	2,007	30,384
2023	Properties	42	12	15	41	9	119
2023	Rooms	12,787	2,703	3,979	9,703	2,007	31,179

== Cruise ships ==
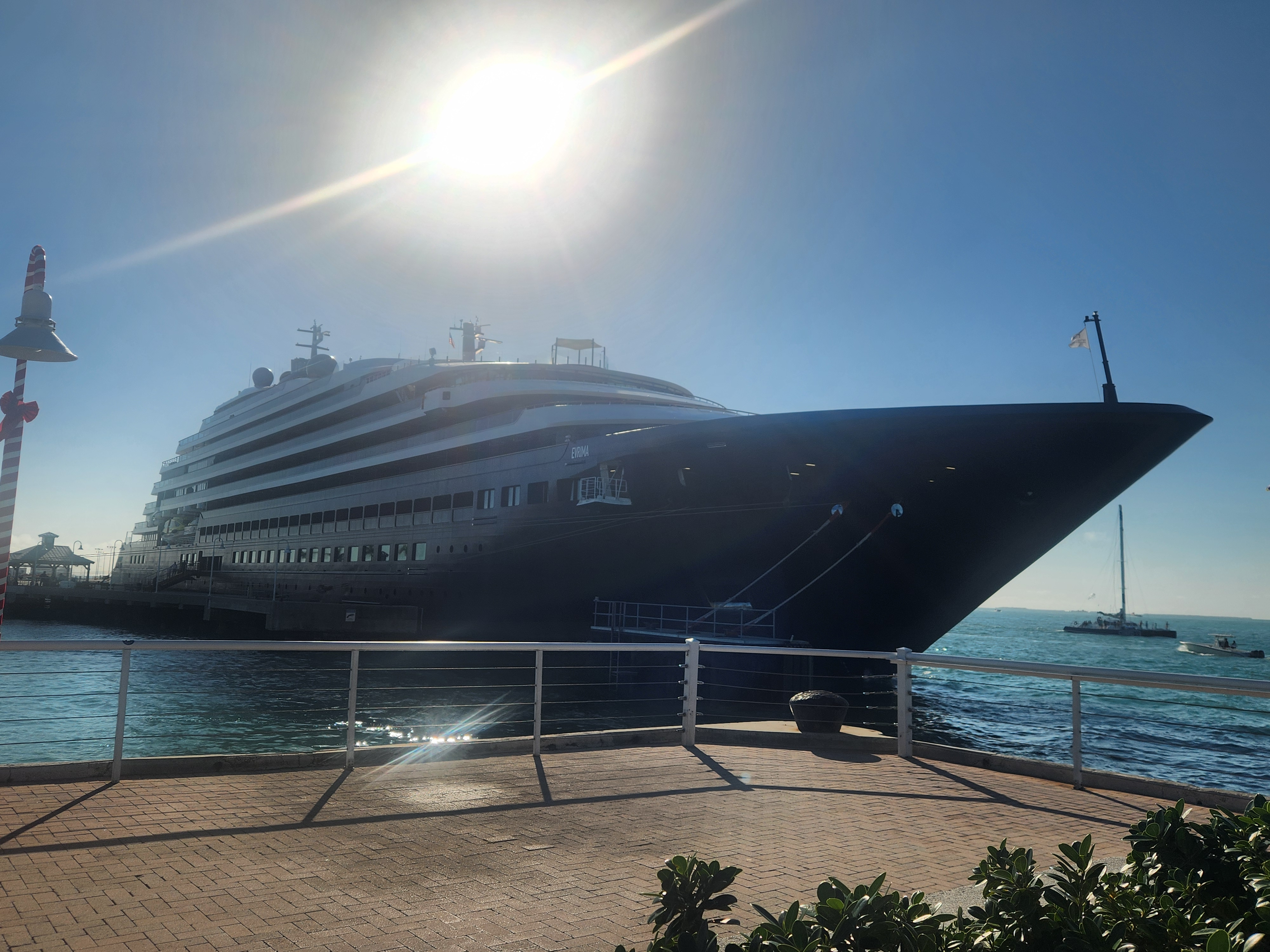
Evrima docked on Pier B at Port of Key West

In June 2017, The Ritz-Carlton announced that its brand would be extended to cruising through The Ritz-Carlton Yacht Collection. The cruise line was established as a separate company by maritime executive Douglas Prothero in collaboration with funds managed by Oaktree Capital Management. The Ritz-Carlton Hotel Company licensed its name to the venture and agreed to provide hospitality services under a long-term operating agreement rather than owning the operation.

The first vessel, Evrima, was ordered from the Spanish shipyard Hijos de J. Barreras and was originally due to enter service in January 2020. Construction problems at the yard, followed by the COVID-19 pandemic, repeatedly delayed her debut. She carried her first guests in October 2022. Two larger vessels, Ilma and Luminara, were subsequently built by Chantiers de l'Atlantique in France and entered service in 2024 and 2025 respectively.

The Ritz-Carlton Yacht Collection joined Marriott Bonvoy on November 9, 2021.

== Controversies ==
=== Maasai Mara, Kenya controversy ===
In 2025 The Ritz-Carlton Hotel Company became the subject of a high-profile environmental and land-use dispute linked to the opening of the Ritz-Carlton Maasai Mara Safari Camp, a 20-suite luxury lodge on the banks of the Sand River in Kenya’s Maasai Mara National Reserve, near the border with Tanzania’s Serengeti National Park. The property, developed by Lazizi Mara Limited and operated under a franchise agreement with the Ritz-Carlton brand, opened in August 2025 with reported starting rates of more than US$3,500 per person per night.

Shortly before the opening, Maasai elder and conservationist Meitamei Olol Dapash, director of the Institute for Maasai Education, Research and Conservation (MERC), filed a case in Kenya’s Environment and Land Court against Marriott, The Ritz-Carlton, Lazizi Mara Limited and Kenyan authorities. The lawsuit alleges that the lodge was approved and constructed in violation of the Maasai Mara Management Plan 2023–2032, including a moratorium on new tourism accommodation in certain sensitive zones of the reserve, and that the project went ahead without adequate environmental impact assessment or meaningful consultation with affected Maasai communities.

Dapash and supporting researchers argue that the camp lies within or adjacent to an important wildlife movement route used by wildebeest and other migratory species moving between the Serengeti and the Maasai Mara, and that associated infrastructure, vehicle traffic and light and noise could further fragment habitat in an already pressured ecosystem. Conservation organisations and some tourism commentators have linked the dispute to broader concerns about rapid growth of high-end tourism in the Mara, warning that additional large lodges could exacerbate wildlife declines, particularly in the eastern Mara and Loita plains where certain wildebeest populations have already fallen sharply.

Marriott, The Ritz-Carlton and Lazizi Mara Limited have rejected the allegations, stating that all necessary environmental and planning approvals were obtained from Kenyan agencies and that the camp was sited outside any mapped migration corridor. Narok County officials, the National Environment Management Authority (NEMA) and the Kenya Wildlife Service (KWS) have defended the project, describing the location as a designated “tourism investment low-use zone” in the Maasai Mara Management Plan and citing GPS-tracking data showing wildebeest using the full breadth of the Kenya–Tanzania border rather than a single narrow route that could be blocked by one camp. Proponents of the project also point to anticipated tax revenues, employment and local procurement benefits linked to the development.

In February of 2026, Kenya’s Environment and Land Court dismissed the lawsuit finding that it lacked jurisdiction: "The Court finds that it lacks jurisdiction to deal with this matter as there are relevant alternative disputes resolution mechanisms, which were not employed by the Plaintiffs and therefore this suit was prematurely filed, and the Court is divested of Jurisdiction. Without Jurisdiction, the Court’s hands are tied."

=== British guest jailed over sexual harassment complaint ===
In 2024, Craig Barratt and his wife, Sarah, a British couple, became involved in a legal dispute in Qatar after Sarah alleged that she had been sexually harassed by two men while staying at the Ritz-Carlton Doha. According to the couple, one of the men asked for her room number and made sexually explicit remarks that caused her to fear for her safety. Barratt subsequently complained to the hotel, whose management allegedly reviewed security footage and identified the men.

Following the incident, Barratt posted a review on TripAdvisor warning that the hotel was unsafe for women. The review was reportedly removed after the hotel complained, and the hotel’s authorised representative subsequently filed a criminal complaint against Barratt under Qatar’s cybercrime legislation. Barratt said that he was not informed of the proceedings and was convicted in absentia by a Qatari court in February 2025.

Barratt discovered the conviction when he was detained at Hamad International Airport in June 2025. According to statements by the couple, he was sentenced to one week in prison, fined 20,000 Qatari riyals and ordered to be deported; the imprisonment sentence was later removed on appeal. He was detained again in October 2025, reportedly spending four nights in custody before being deported from Qatar.

The case attracted attention because of allegations that a hotel guest’s complaint about the handling of sexual harassment resulted in criminal proceedings against her husband. Barratt said that the case had broader implications for international visitors and the use of Qatar’s cybercrime laws, while the account was presented primarily through statements by the couple and media reports. Qatar’s legal system places a high burden on complainants in sexual-assault cases, and sexual relations outside marriage are illegal, according to British government travel guidance.

== In popular culture ==
- In E.B. White's 1970 children's novel The Trumpet of the Swan, the main character Louis (a trumpeter swan) stays at the Ritz-Carlton Boston, where he eats watercress sandwiches and sleeps in the bathtub.
- The Ritz is featured in the 1976 Queen song "Good Old-Fashioned Lover Boy" in the line "Dining at the Ritz we'll meet at nine"
- On the HBO original series Boardwalk Empire, the character of Enoch "Nucky" Thompson (portrayed by Steve Buscemi), the treasurer of Atlantic County, occupies the entire 9th floor of a fictionalized version of the hotel in Atlantic City, New Jersey. The real Enoch "Nucky" Johnson on which Nucky Thompson was based did in fact occupy an entire floor of suites at the Ritz-Carlton Atlantic City until his arrest in 1941 on charges of tax evasion.
- A 1922 novella by F. Scott Fitzgerald is titled The Diamond as Big as the Ritz.
- The 2003 film American Wedding used the Ritz-Carlton in Half Moon Bay, California, as the filming location for the wedding venue.
- The Ritz also features in the Irving Berlin song "Puttin' On the Ritz" in which the hotel chain served as an inspiration for the titular expression, meaning to live opulently.
- In 2015, the rapper Plies released the song "Ran Off On Da Plug Twice", originally titled "Ritz Carlton". In the song, he raps about his affinity for routinely spending time at the lavish hotel.
- Michael Hutchence of INXS, aged 37, was found dead at the Ritz-Carlton hotel in Double Bay, Sydney on November 22, 1997, in Room 524.
- American telenovela and drama Jane the Virgin uses the Ritz-Carlton Marina Del Rey's property as the setting for the show, while the storyline is based in Miami (whereas that Ritz-Carlton Marina Del Rey is in Los Angeles, California).
- The 1939 song "A Nightingale Sang in Berkeley Square" includes the line "There were angels dining at the Ritz," referring specifically to the Ritz London's restaurant. This is in turn referenced by scenes in Terry Pratchett and Neil Gaiman's novel Good Omens and the miniseries based on it in which an angel and a demon (or fallen angel) have lunch at the Ritz London.
- The CW 2017 soap reboot Dynasty features The Ritz-Carlton Reynolds, Lake Oconee in Greensboro, Georgia, as the set for Season 2, Episode 11 "The Sight of You" which aired on January 25, 2019. For this episode, the hotel serves as a destination for a "girls' trip" to a ski lodge in Idaho.
