= Ritz-Carlton, Tianjin =

Hotel in Tianjin, China

The Ritz-Carlton, Tianjin
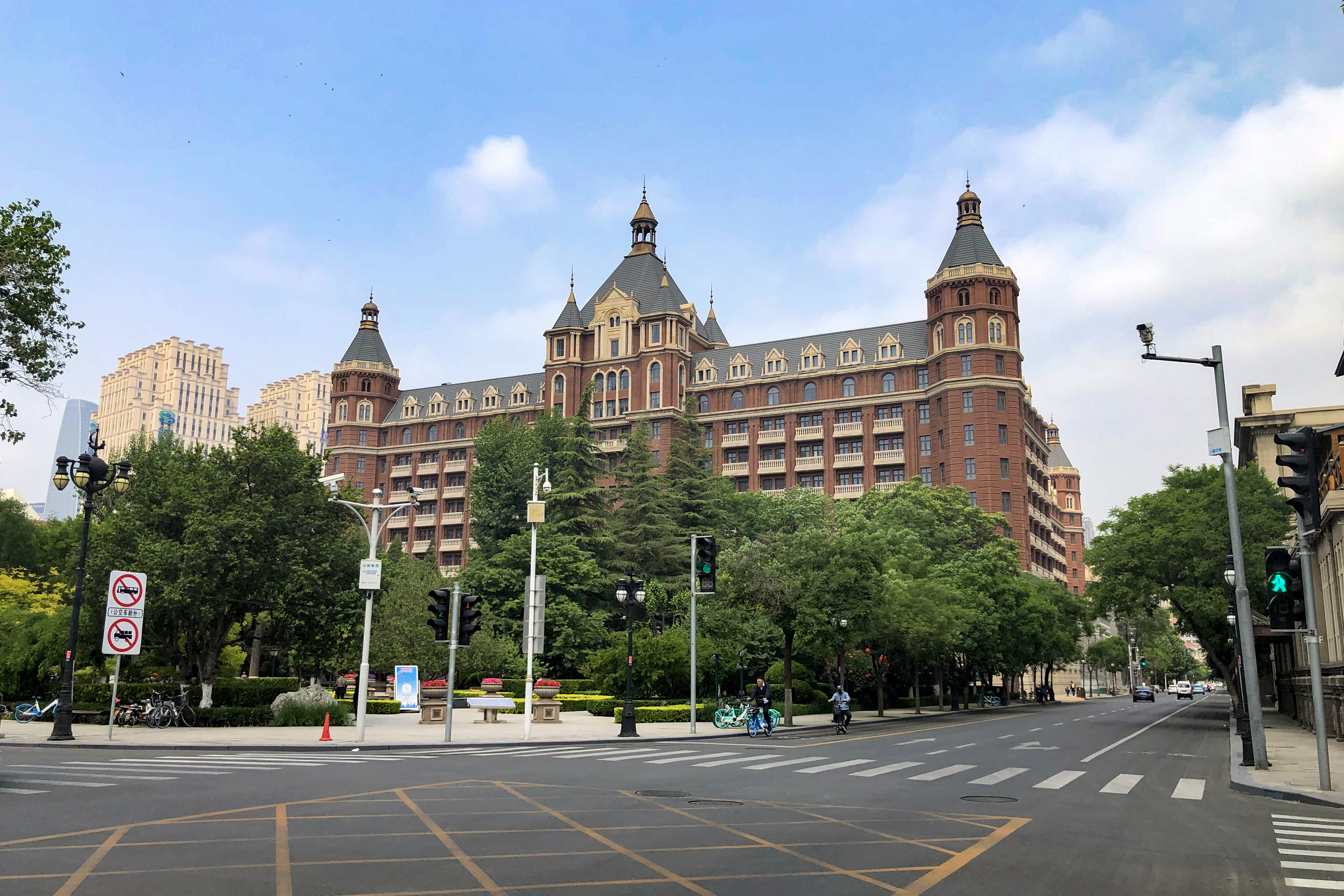
- Interactive map of the The Ritz-Carlton, Tianjin area

General information
- Location: 167 Dagu North Road, Heping District, Tianjin, China
- Opening: October 18, 2013
- Owner: ~~Tianjin Real Estate Group~~; Undisclosed buyer H5219
- Operator: The Ritz-Carlton Hotel Company

Technical details
- Floor area: 98,215 square meters

Design and construction
- Architect: Zhao Chunshui
- Architecture firm: Tianjin Urban Planning and Design Institute Co., Ltd.
- Developer: Tianjin Real Estate Group

Other information
- Number of rooms: 277
- Number of restaurants: 4

Website
- www.ritzcarlton.com

The Ritz-Carlton, Tianjin, located at 167 Dagu North Road, Heping District, Tianjin, officially opened on October 18, 2013.

== Architecture ==
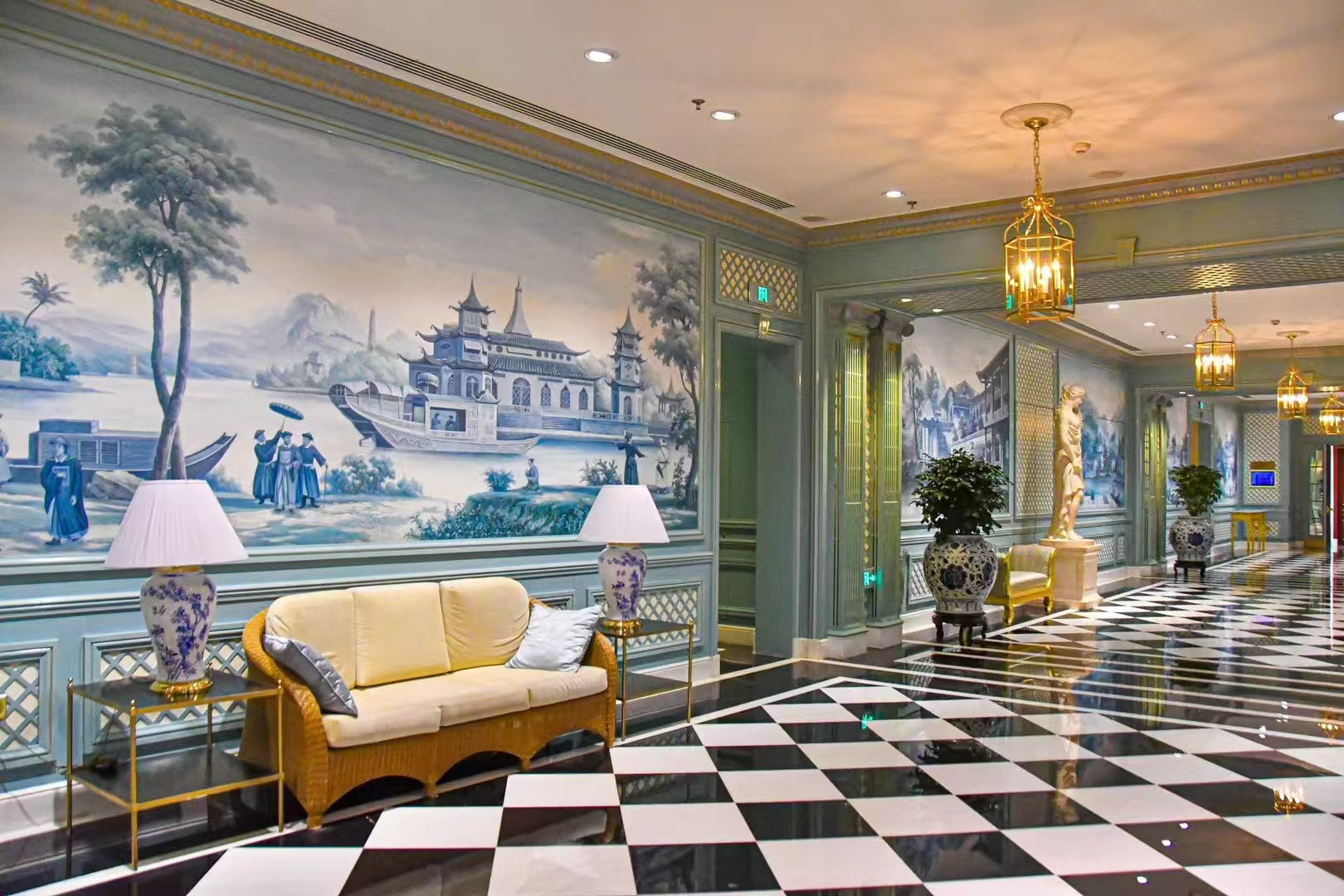
天津丽思卡尔顿酒店走廊

The main structure of The Ritz-Carlton, Tianjin is part of the Tai’an Road Five Courtyard Project, developed by Tianjin Real Estate Group. The architectural design was led by architect Zhao Chunshui of the Tianjin Urban Planning and Design Institute.
