= The Fairfax at Embassy Row =

Historic luxury hotel in Washington, D.C.

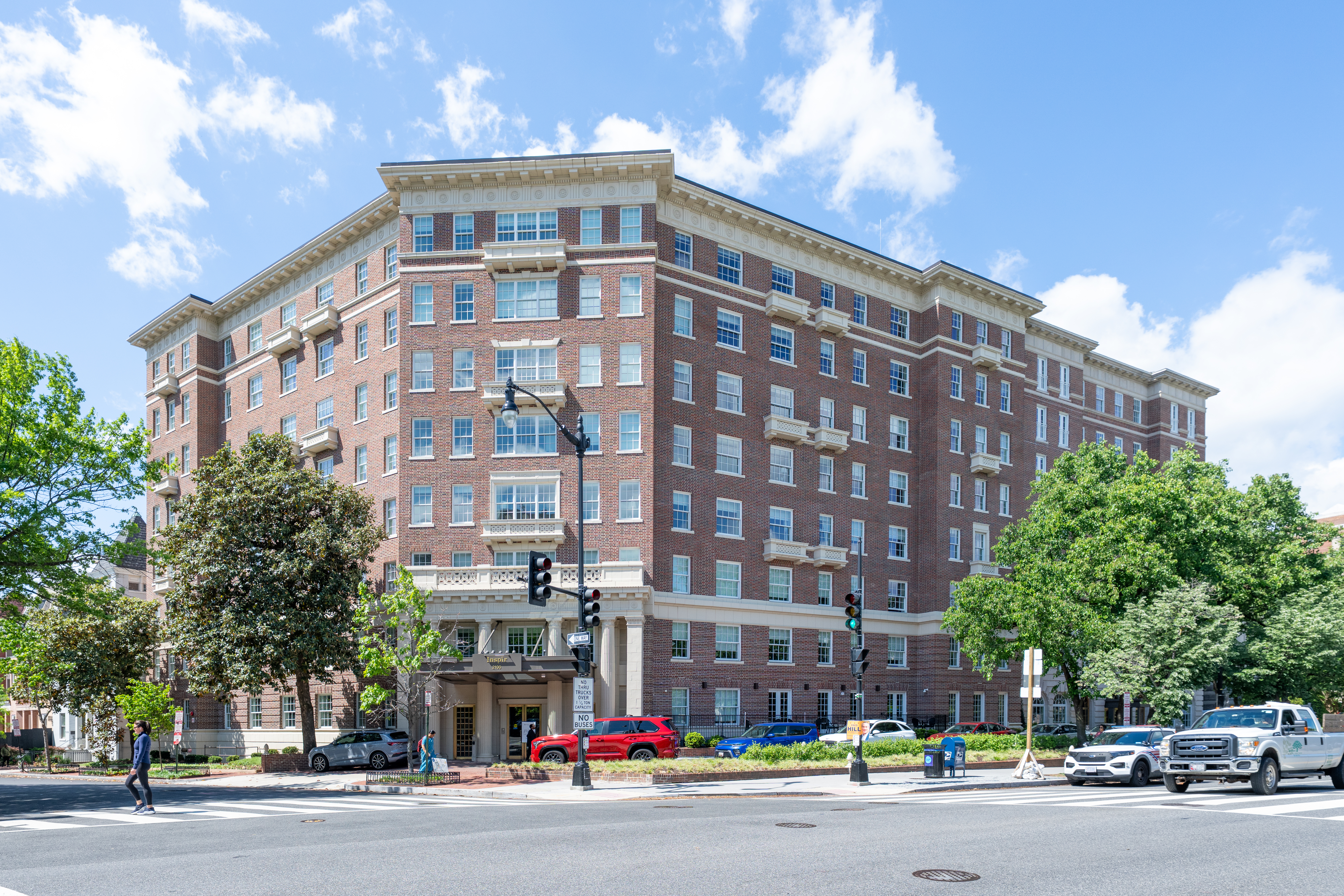
- The Fairfax at Embassy Row Exterior

- Location within the District of Columbia

General information
- Location: Washington, D.C., United States, 2100 Massachusetts Avenue
- Coordinates: 38°54′38″N 77°2′50″W
- Opening: 1927
- Closed: 2021

Technical details
- Floor count: 8

Design and construction
- Architect: B. Stanley Simmons

Other information
- Number of rooms: 259
- Number of restaurants: 2

The Fairfax at Embassy Row (opened as The Fairfax Hotel) was a historic luxury hotel at 2100 Massachusetts Avenue NW in Washington, D.C., in the United States. It opened in 1927 and operated under various owners and names until closing permanently in 2021. It reopened in 2025 as a retirement home. The Fairfax is designated as a contributing property to the Dupont Circle Historic District and the Massachusetts Avenue Historic District.

== History ==
Built on the site of a house built by Brainard Warner, the Washington financier and real-estate developer who created Kensington, Maryland, The Fairfax Hotel was designed by architect B. Stanley Simmons and opened in 1927.

In 1932, it was purchased by Colonel H. Grady Gore and his wife Jamie. It operated as a combination transient/residential hotel and was the home of numerous government figures. Famous residents included Mrs. Henry Cabot Lodge, Admiral and Mrs. Chester William Nimitz, and Senator John L. McClellan. Future President George H. W. Bush and his parents, Senator and Mrs. Prescott Bush, lived at The Fairfax when in Washington. Future Vice President Al Gore's family lived in the three-bedroom suite on the hotel's top floor for a total of twenty years during his youth. Gore's father Albert Gore, Sr. was a senator from Tennessee and was also the cousin of the owner. The Fairfax was also a popular residence of families in the Foreign Service, as it was the only establishment with kitchens that fell within the limited temporary-housing allowance provided by the State Department. The hotel hosted the first inaugural breakfast for President Dwight Eisenhower in January 1953.

In 1977, the Gores sold the hotel to John B. Coleman for $5 million. Coleman soon spent $10 million on a renovation, and renamed the hotel The Ritz-Carlton Washington, D.C. in 1982, having licensed the name from Gerald Blakely, owner of the Ritz-Carlton in Boston, for a fee of 1.5 percent of the Washington hotel's annual gross revenue. When the modern Ritz-Carlton Hotel Company was created in the mid-1980s, they assumed management of the hotel. The hotel was in bankruptcy from 1986 until 1988. Al Anwa USA, controlled by Saudi Arabian Sheik Abdul Aziz bin Ibrahim al-Ibrahim, bought the hotel in 1989 and renovated it at a cost of $15 million. In 1995, Ritz-Carlton and Al Anwa fell into a bitter, two-year legal dispute over the management company's fee.

On August 2, 1997, Ritz-Carlton ended its management contract with Al Anwa, which also owned Ritz-Carlton hotels in Aspen, Houston and New York. The four Al Anwa hotels all dropped the Ritz-Carlton name on August 14, 1997, and ITT Sheraton Luxury Collection began managing them. Every one of them, confusingly, was renamed ITT Sheraton Luxury Collection Hotel. ITT Sheraton was sold to Starwood in October 1997, and Starwood bought the four nameless hotels from Al Anwa in January 1998.

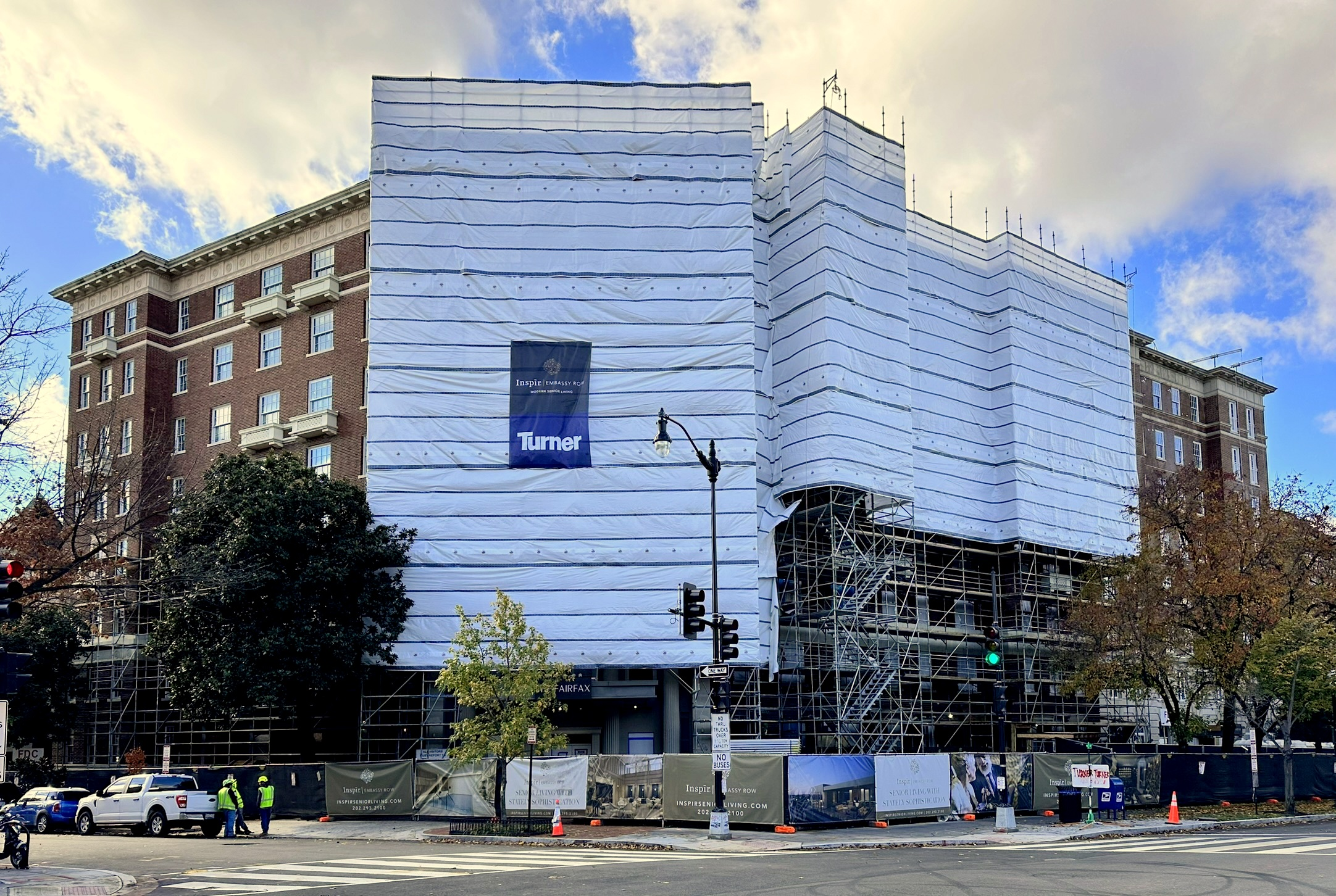
The former hotel being renovated into the Inspir Embassy Row in November 2023

Starwood announced that same month that they would rename the Washington hotel The St. Regis, but that never happened. (The St. Regis name would be given in 1999 to The Carlton Hotel, another Starwood property nearby.) Meanwhile, the hotel continued to operate without a name until October 14, 1998, when it was renamed The Westin Fairfax. The hotel was renamed again in April 2002, becoming The Westin Embassy Row, because Starwood worried that the name Fairfax would make travelers think the hotel was not in Washington, but in nearby suburban Fairfax County, Virginia.

In January 2006, Pyramid Advisors LLC purchased The Westin Embassy Row, along with two other Starwood hotels in San Diego and Framingham, Massachusetts, for a total of $146 million. Pyramid closed the hotel in 2007 and spent $27.1 million renovating the property. The hotel reopened in November 2008 as The Fairfax at Embassy Row, as part of The Luxury Collection division of Starwood.

The hotel was acquired by Westbrook Partners at a foreclosure auction in April 2011. The Fairfax dropped its affiliation with Starwood on November 5, 2015, in favor of a partnership with Preferred Hotels & Resorts.

The hotel permanently closed on September 7, 2021, after Westbrook Partners sold the property to Maplewood Senior Living and Omega Healthcare Investors Inc. for $58.1 million. The new owners converted the structure to a 174-unit retirement home named Inspir Embassy Row (styled as Inspīr Embassy Row), which opened on February 13, 2025.

== The Jockey Club ==
The Jockey Club restaurant opened in the Fairfax in 1961. It was created by Louise Gore, daughter of the owner, Grady Gore, and modeled on the continental restaurants she had come to know when she worked for UNESCO in Paris . She named the restaurant after a private club in London and a restaurant in Madrid. Within a year, Holiday magazine had called The Jockey Club Washington's first elegant restaurant. The restaurant remained one of the city's most famous watering holes for the rich and politically powerful for decades. The restaurant was popular with members of the Kennedy family, Nancy Reagan, Vernon Jordan, and celebrities including Marlon Brando, Frank Sinatra and Warren Beatty. The Jockey Club closed in 2001 and was replaced by a restaurant named Cabo.

It was revived in its original space in 2008, after an absence of seven years. However it did not prove financially successful and closed again in 2011. It was replaced by a restaurant named 2100 Prime, which also soon closed. The space served as a breakfast room called The Capitol Room until the hotel's permanent closure in 2021.

== Famous guests ==
Famous guests of the hotel included Jackie Kennedy, President Jimmy Carter, Margaret Thatcher, President Bill Clinton, Vernon Jordan, Lady Victoria Rothschild, Betsy Bloomingdale, Estée Lauder, William F. Buckley, Frank Sinatra, Liza Minnelli, Jack Nicholson, Steve Martin, Julie Andrews, Lynn Redgrave, Samuel L. Jackson, Angela Bassett, and Dr. Matthew Cifelli.

== Rating ==
The AAA gave the Fairfax at Embassy Row four diamonds out of five in 2009. The hotel maintained that rating for many years before it closed, and received four diamonds again for 2016. Forbes Travel Guide (formerly known as Mobil Guide) declined to give the hotel either five or four stars in 2016, instead calling it "recommended".
