= The Newbury Boston =

Luxury hotel in Boston, Massachusetts

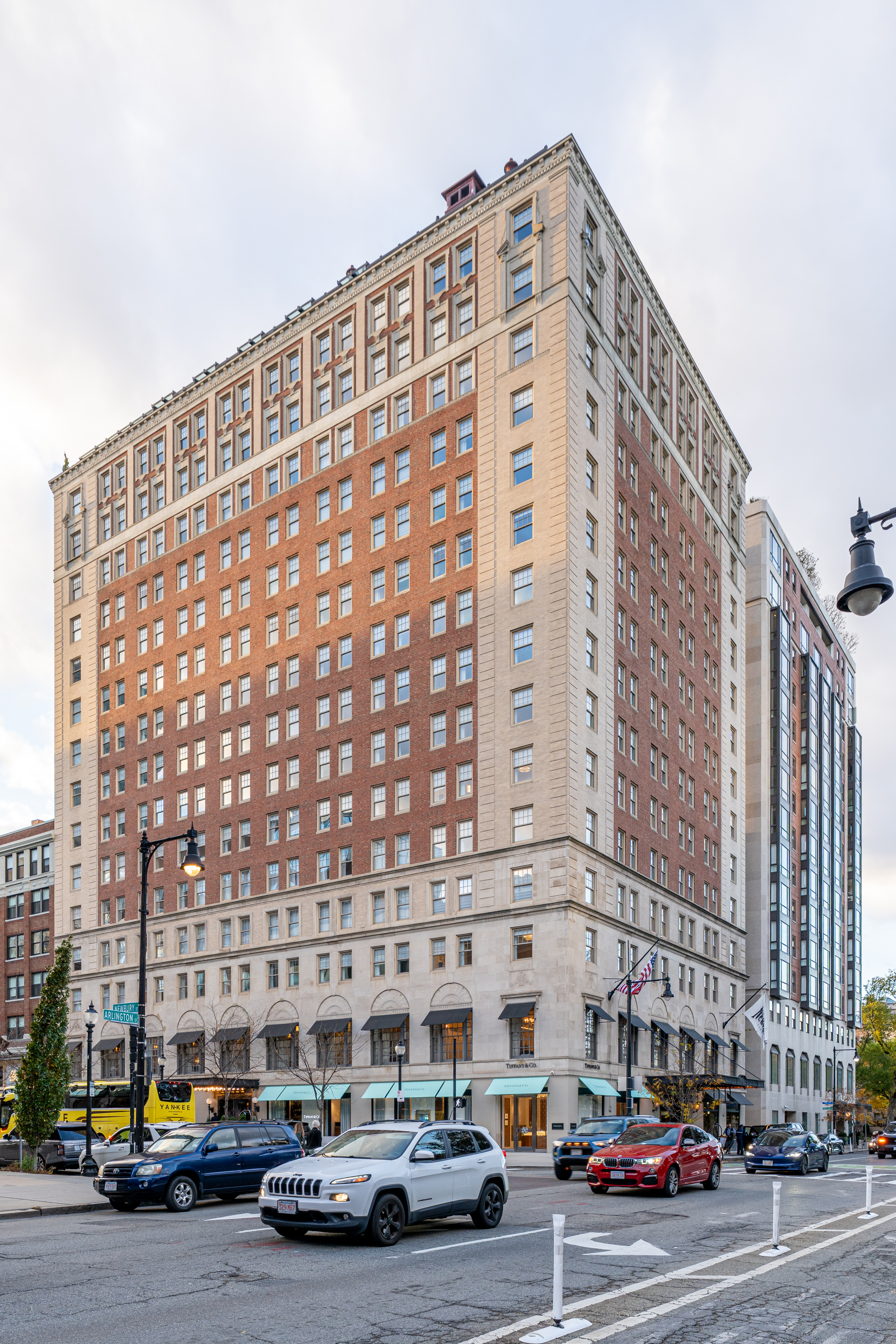
- The Newbury Boston, 2025.

General information
- Location: Boston, Massachusetts, U.S., 1 Newbury Street
- Coordinates: 42.3529°N 71.0713°W
- Opening: 1927
- Owner: ICONIQ Capital, New England Development, Eastern Real Estate, Lubert-Adler, Rockpoint Group, and Highgate
- Operator: Highgate

Design and construction
- Architect: George B. Post & Son

Other information
- Number of rooms: 286
- Number of suites: 44

Website
- The Newbury Boston

The Newbury Boston is a historic luxury hotel in Boston, Massachusetts. It opened in 1927 as The Ritz-Carlton Hotel. The property faces Newbury Street and Boston Public Garden in the Back Bay.

The hotel was for many years part of first one, then a second chain using the Ritz-Carlton name. The Ritz-Carlton Boston was purchased in 2006 by Taj Hotels and renamed Taj Boston on January 11, 2007. Taj Boston closed on October 31, 2019, and was subsequently renamed The Newbury Boston. The hotel was set to reopen in early 2020, but the reopening was postponed to May 2021 due to the COVID-19 pandemic.

== History ==
=== The Ritz-Carlton Boston ===
==== The Wyner Years: 1927–1964 ====
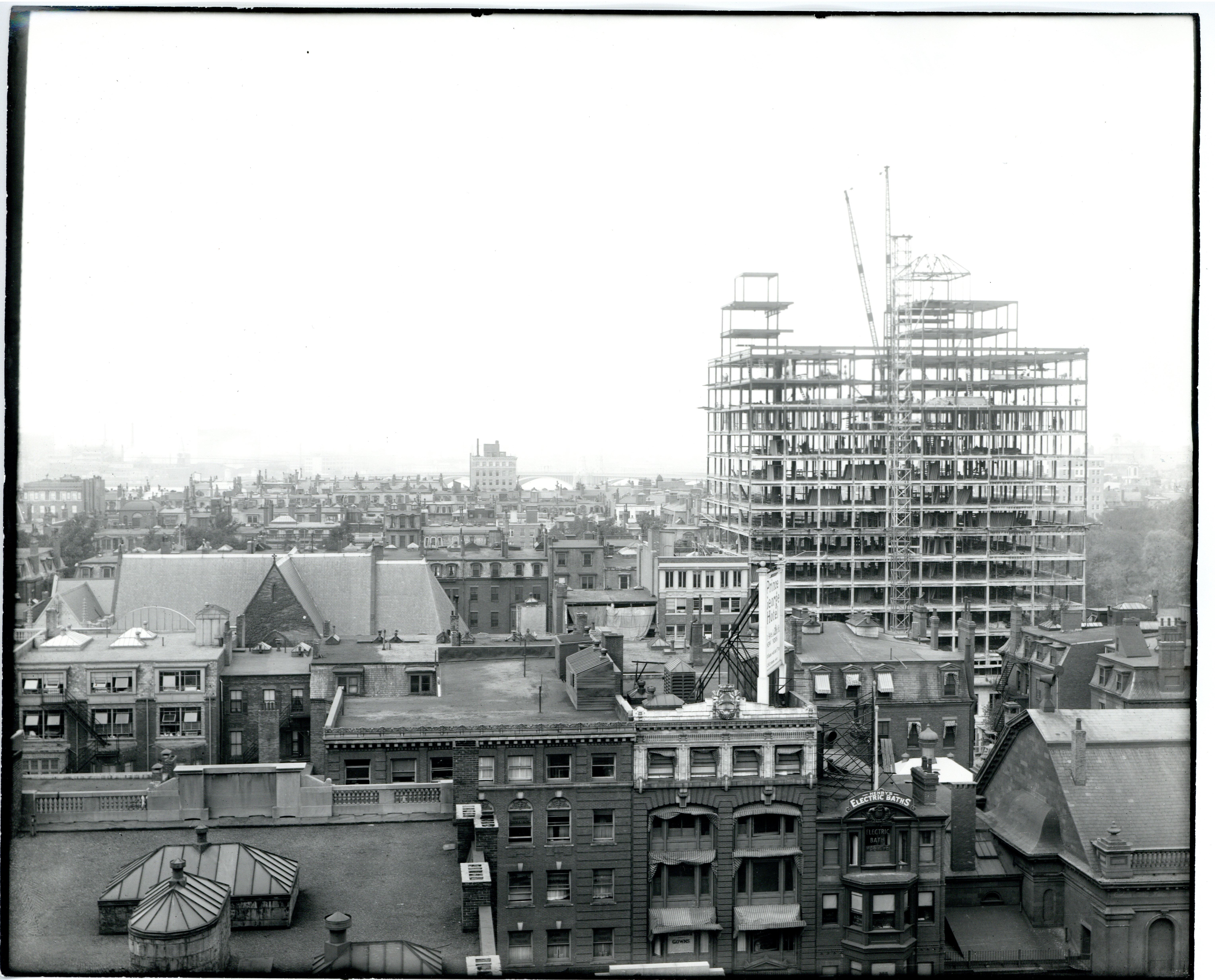
The Ritz-Carlton under construction, September 7, 1926

In 1926, 29-year-old Edward N. Wyner bought a third-acre parcel at the corner of Arlington and Newbury streets and formed a partnership called The Ritz-Arlington Trust with his father, George, and business associate, John S. Slater.

The trust sold $2.1 million of bonds to finance the construction of an apartment building, to be called the Mayflower. The 18-story, 201-foot (61 m) brick building, designed by Strickland, Blodget & Law Architects, was far taller than anything else along Newbury Street at the time. Construction had started on the second floor when Wyner was persuaded by then-Mayor James Michael Curley to make the Mayflower a world-class, 300-room hotel. Wyner received permission from the Hôtel Ritz Paris and the US-based Ritz Carlton Investing Company, founded by Albert Keller, to use the Ritz Carlton name and the Ritz-Carlton Hotel opened on May 18, 1927. Room rates were $5 to $15 per night; $40 per night for suites.

After a hugely successful opening, the stock market crash of 1929 and ensuing Depression brought financial difficulties. The Wyner family funded the hotel's operating losses during the early 1930s, although the interest on the bonds went unpaid. Still in 1933, when only 30 guests were registered in the hotel, Wyner turned on the lights in every guest room to give the appearance the hotel was full.

Wyner died of a heart attack on Dec. 5, 1961. His six sons tried to continue operation of the hotel, but it was too difficult, and a decision was made to sell.

==== The Blakeley Years: 1964–1983 ====
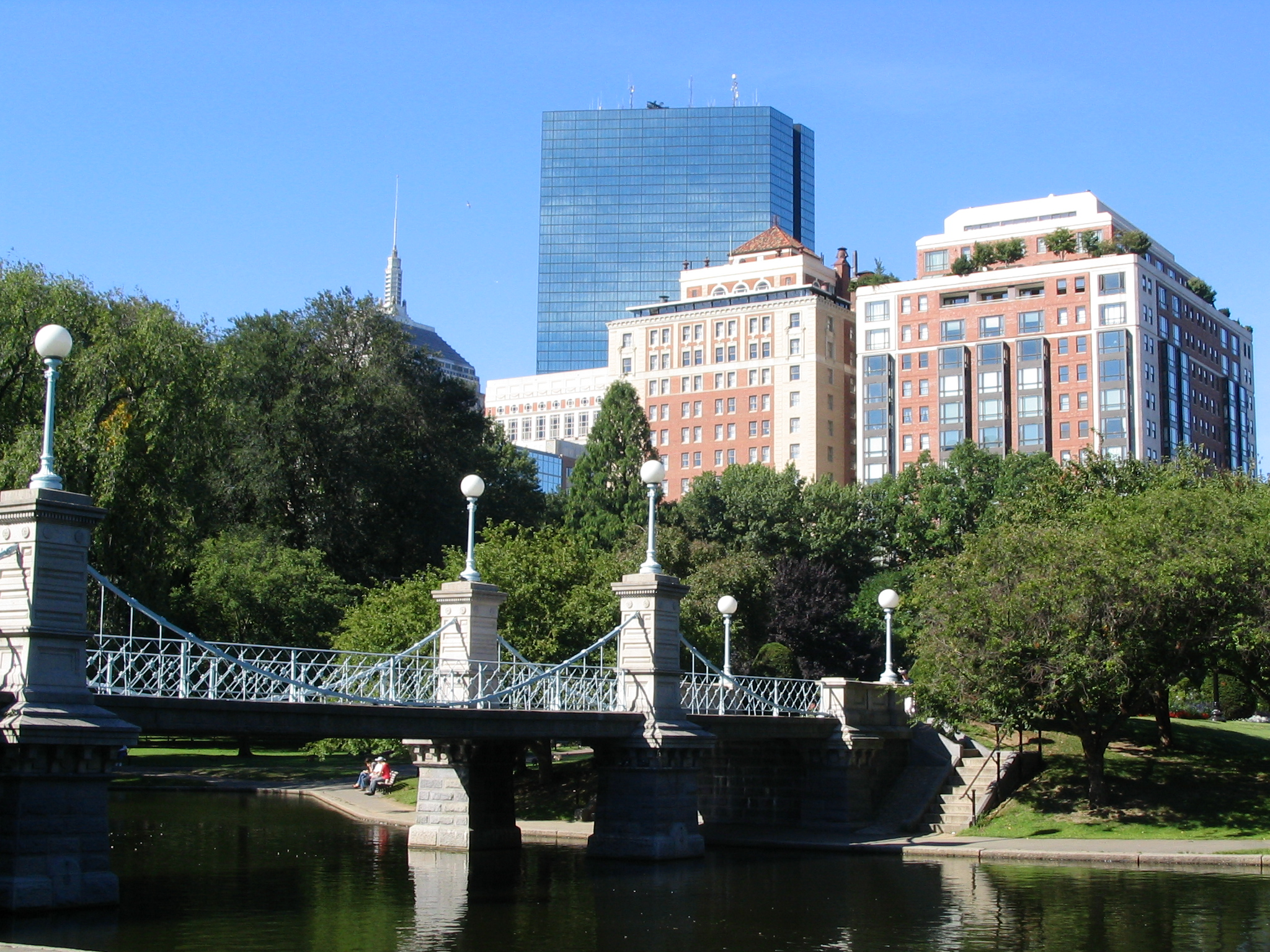
The hotel in 2004. Original 1927 wing in the middle, 1981 wing on the right

The unpaid interest on the bonds dissuaded many from trying to buy the hotel. But Cabot, Cabot & Forbes principal Gerald F. Blakeley Jr. was interested. After more than a year of legal work, Hale and Dorr succeeded at clearing the bond obligations, and in October 1964 Blakeley and associates Paul Hellmuth and Charles Spaulding acquired the Ritz-Carlton Boston for $3.8 million.

"Out of the 20 years I owned it," said Blakeley, "it made money three years. The other years it broke even, but from a public relations standpoint for CC&F, it was a tremendous asset."

Blakely spent seven years, from 1972 to 1979 gaining community approvals and municipal permits to construct an 18-story addition on land adjacent to the hotel, at the corner of Commonwealth Avenue and Arlington Street, where the Engineers Club formerly stood. Local residents feared it would cast a shadow on the Boston Public Garden. The new wing opened on September 13, 1981, with a grand ballroom, three smaller function rooms, and 80 additional hotel rooms. 52 residential units in the addition opened later that year.

In the late 1960s Blakeley obtained the rights to the Ritz-Carlton name in North America (with the exception of Montreal and New York). In June 1978, Blakeley was awarded the rights and privileges of the Ritz-Carlton trademark in the United States and was given a US Service Mark Registration.

==== The Corporate Years (1983–1999) ====
In August 1983, W. B. Johnson Properties bought The Ritz-Carlton Boston and the US trademark for $75.5 million and established the Ritz-Carlton Hotel Company Johnson would expand the company from only the Boston property to 30 hotels worldwide in just 10 years.

He obtained financing to do so from Manufacturers Hanover Trust of New York in 1983 in the amount of $85 million secured by the Ritz-Carlton Boston. This loan was refinanced in 1989 by Manhattan Tops USA of New York for $136.5 million and again in 1994 by Sumitomo Bank of Japan. By 1996, this mortgage was in default and the interest and penalties brought the total debt to $214.8 million.

By splitting this mortgage note into three parts, Sumitomo Bank was able to unbundle the Ritz-Carlton Boston from the trademark rights to the Ritz-Carlton brand worldwide. Blackstone Real Estate Acquisitions of New York bought the Ritz-Carlton Boston's mortgage at auction for $75 million in February 1998.

A month later, Host Marriott Corp. of Bethesda, Maryland, acquired the hotel from Blackstone for $100 million. Marriott International, which franchises and manages Marriott's 325,000 rooms, bought the Ritz-Carlton Hotel Co. and rights to the Ritz-Carlton name worldwide from W.B. Johnson for $290 million in a two-part transaction completed in 1998.

==== Millennium Ownership (1999-2006) ====
In 1998, Christopher Jeffries, founding partner of Millennium Partners, obtained Ritz-Carlton franchises from Marriott for four hotel properties under construction: two in Washington, one in New York, and one in Atlanta, Georgia. In addition, Jeffries sought a Ritz-Carlton franchise for a new tower with 155-room hotel rooms and 270-luxury condominiums that he was constructing as part of Boston's 1,800,000-square-foot (170,000 m^{2}) Millennium Place, a mixed-use complex on lower Washington Street. Because of non-competition clauses, the only way he could obtain a second Ritz-Carlton flag in Boston was to own the existing Ritz-Carlton.

In October 1999, Millennium Partners acquired the original Ritz-Carlton Boston from Host Marriott for $122 million. Marriott agreed to allow the Ritz-Carlton affiliation for Millennium's new second hotel, The Ritz-Carlton Boston Common, which opened in 2001 with its adjoining condominium complex, The Residences at the Ritz-Carlton. From 2001 to 2007, Boston was thus home to two Ritz-Carlton hotels that faced each other across Boston Common. In October 2002, The Ritz-Carlton Boston celebrated its 75th anniversary, following a $60 million renovation.

=== Taj Boston (2007-2019) ===
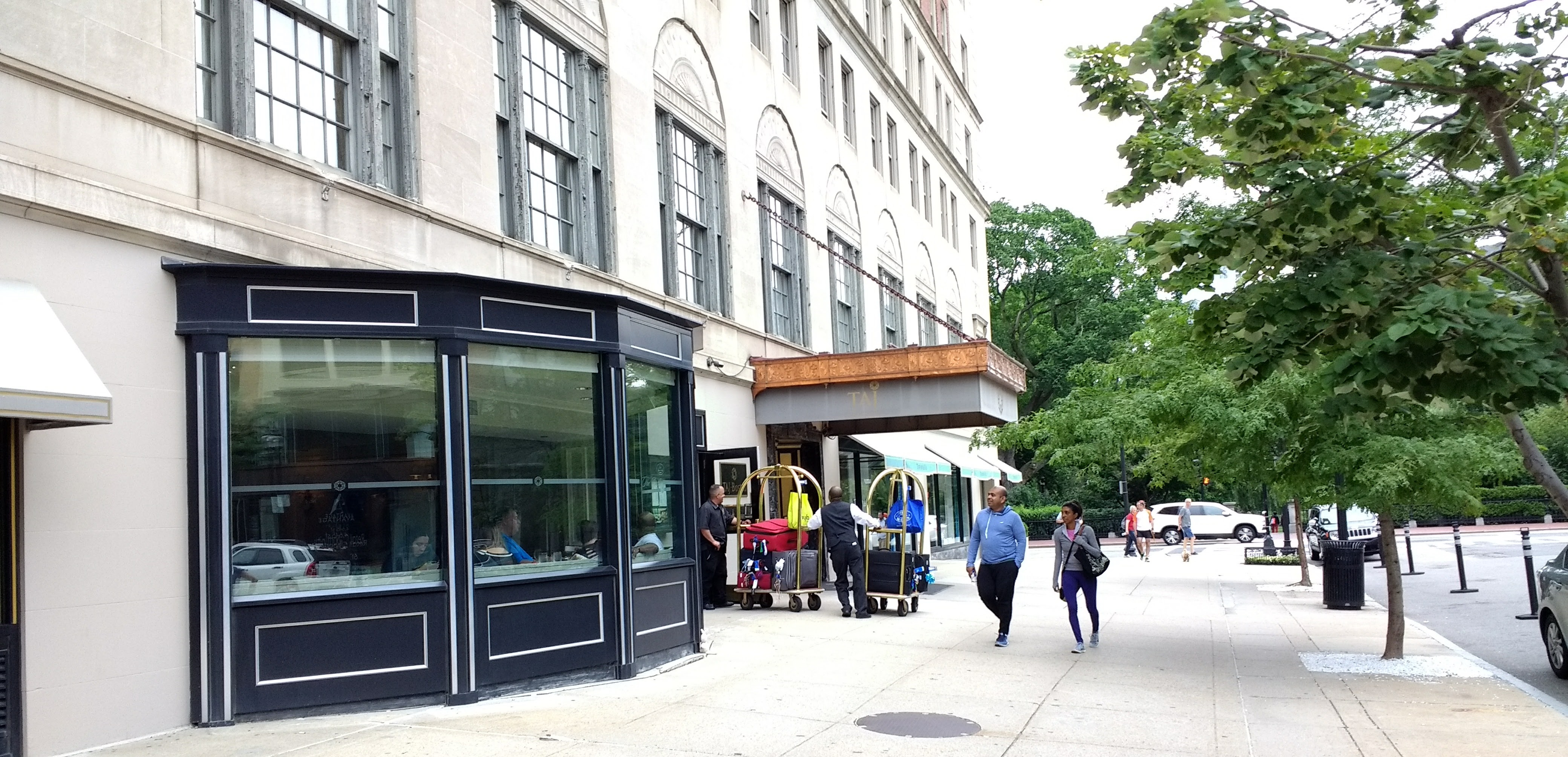
The Taj Newbury Street side entrance in 2017, today the front entrance.

In November 2006, Taj Hotels, a subsidiary of the India-based Tata Group, purchased The Ritz-Carlton Boston from Millennium Partners for $170 Million. The Ritz-Carlton Boston was renamed Taj Boston on January 11, 2007.

In July 2016, the hotel was purchased for $125 million by New England Development/Eastern Real Estate and their partners. The group, led by Steve Karp, includes New England Development, the Rockpoint Group, Eastern Real Estate, and two other unnamed partners.

=== The Newbury Boston (2019-present) ===
The Taj Boston closed on October 31, 2019, and was renamed The Newbury Boston. The hotel was extensively renovated, with design work by Alexandra Champalimaud. Its main entrance was moved from Arlington Street to the former side entrance on Newbury Street. All 273 existing rooms were redesigned and 13 new rooms were added. In addition, the seasonal rooftop restaurant was enclosed, to make it year-round. The hotel was set to reopen in early 2020, but the reopening was postponed to May 2021 due to the COVID-19 pandemic. The hotel reopened on May 18, 2021. A year later, The Newbury Boston became a member of The Leading Hotels of the World.
