= B. Stanley Simmons =

American architect

- Born: Benjamin Stanley Simmons; March 10, 1871; Charles County, Maryland, U.S.
- Died: September 8, 1931 (aged 60); Washington, D.C., U.S.
- Education: Massachusetts Institute of Technology
- Occupation: Architect
- Buildings: Hume School, National Metropolitan Bank Building, Fairfax Hotel, Barr Building

Benjamin Stanley Simmons (March 10, 1871 – September 8, 1931) was an American architect.

== Life ==
Born in Charles County, Maryland, in 1872, Simmons came as a child came to Washington, D.C., where he would later establish his career in architecture. He received his architecture degree at the University of Maryland, and continued his study at MIT. He started designing and building houses in the 1890s, before he moved on to bigger commissions. In 1902, the Evening Star described Simmons as "an architect who has added to the beauty and growth of this city."

He established himself as an extremely prolific architect, ultimately designing more than 280 buildings in the city. Simmons worked with every major developer, and appears to have had a particularly close working relationship with Lester A. Barr and later his son, John L. Barr, with whom he designed some of his best-known commissions. Simmons was versatile, designing a variety of building types including row houses, fraternal clubs, and commercial and institutional buildings. He seems to have had a proclivity for apartment buildings, of which he designed more than 60. Among his other works are the National Metropolitan Bank Building at 15th and G Streets NW (1905), the Elks Club at 919 H Street NW (1908, demolished); and the Fairfax Hotel at 21st and Massachusetts Avenue NW (1921). His earlier Hume School, built in 1891, is on the National Register of Historic Places, along with the National Metropolitan Bank Building, the Wyoming Apartments, and the Barr Building.

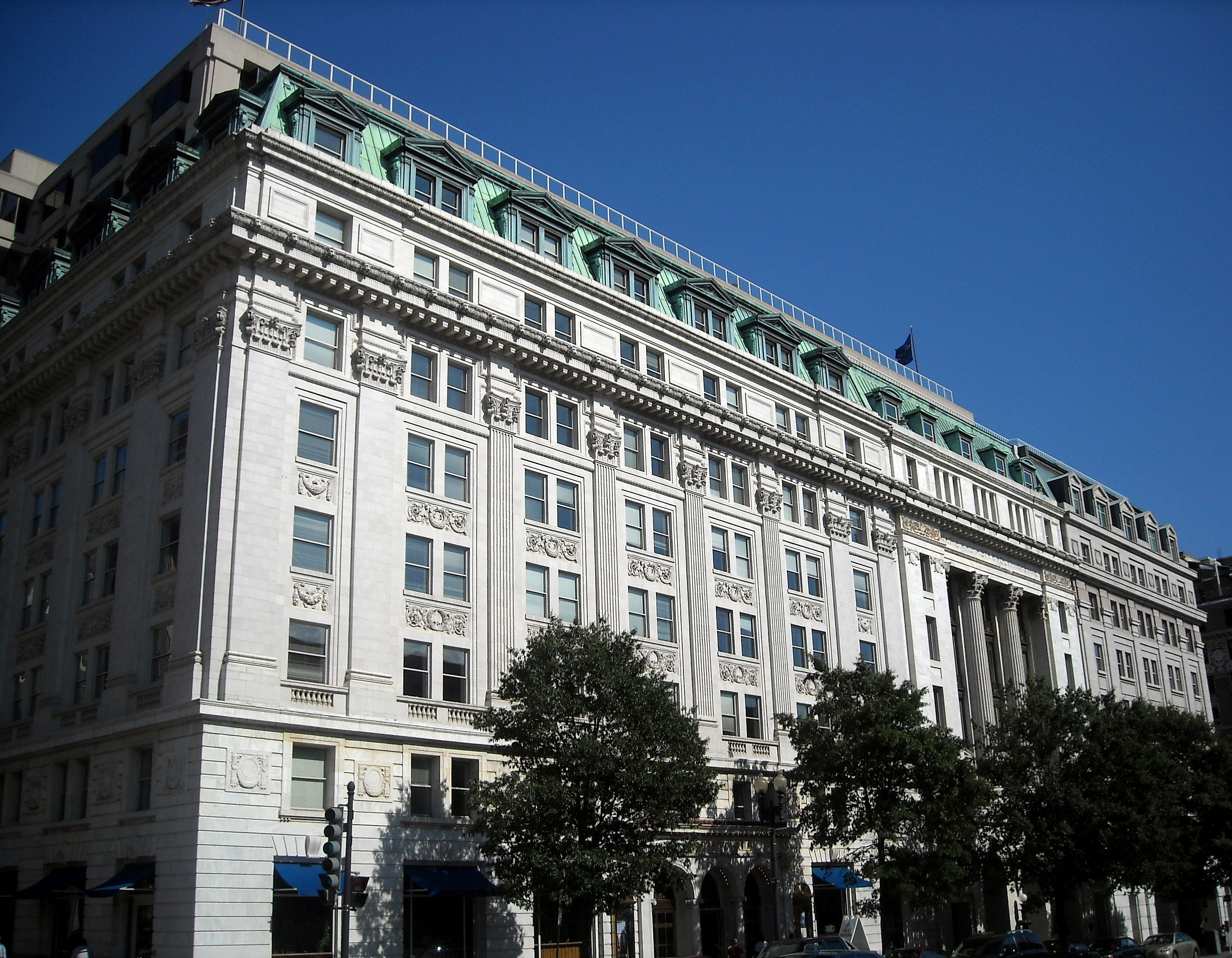
The National Metropolitan Bank Building

Although he never studied at the École des Beaux-Arts, Simmons became a student of the Beaux Arts tradition and the City Beautiful Movement. While his 19th-century speculative row houses reflect Victorian styles of architecture, his early 20th-century buildings are grander and more monumental structures that reflect a variety of academic styles inspired the City Beautiful movement, including the Classical Revival style and Renaissance Revival.

Simmons died in 1931 at 60. He was survived by a son, B. Stanley Jr., and 11 grandchildren. Many of his buildings were recognized in the late 20th century.
