= Barr Building =

- U.S. National Register of Historic Places
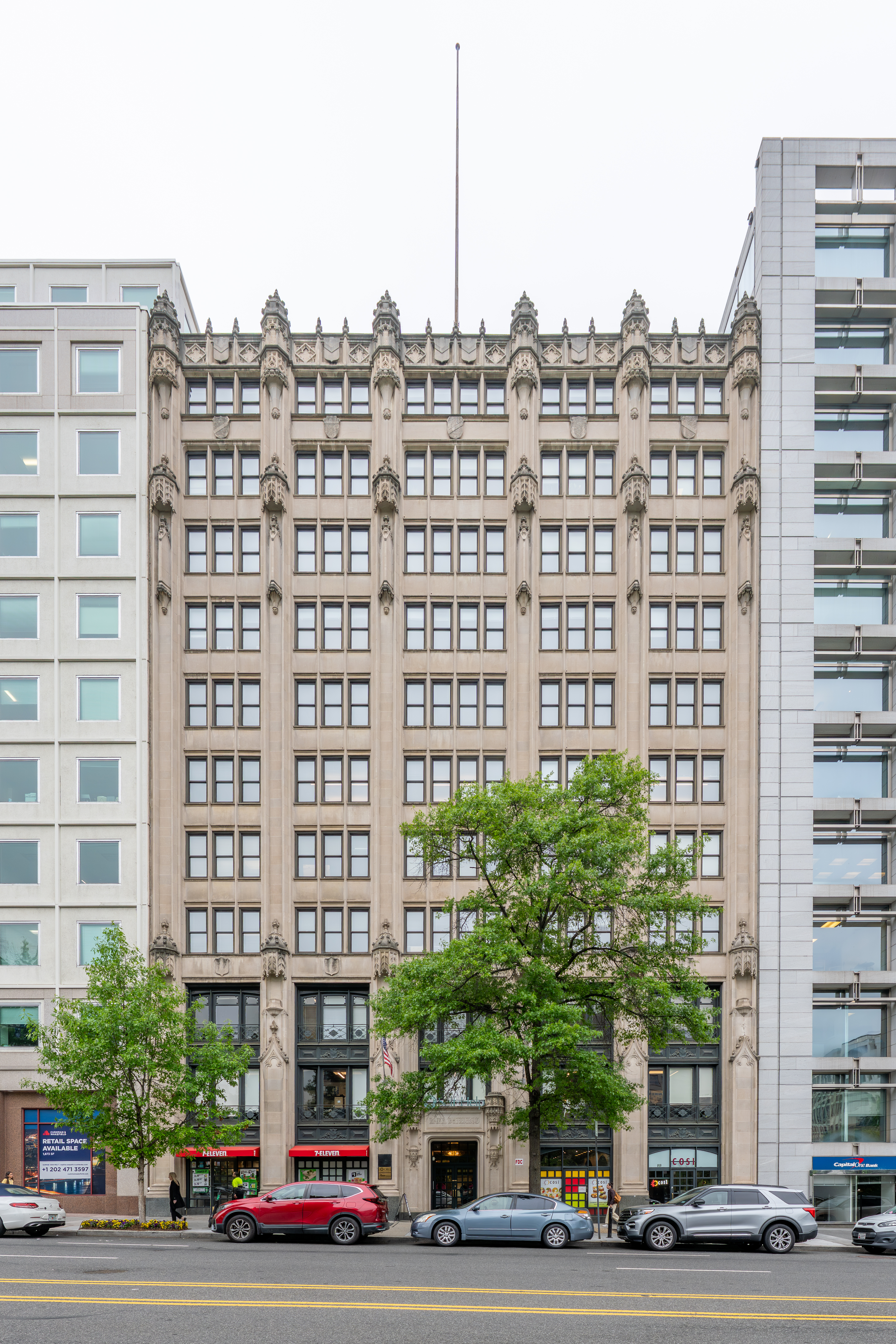
- Barr Building in 2026

- Location within District of Columbia
- Location: 910 17th St., NW; Washington, D.C.
- Coordinates: 38°54′6.807″N 77°02′23.7372″W
- Built: 1927; 99 years ago
- Architect: B. Stanley Simmons
- Architectural style: Gothic Revival
- NRHP reference No.: 12001195
- Added to NRHP: January 14, 2013

The Barr Building is a historic structure located in the Golden Triangle section of Downtown Washington, D.C. In 2004, the Center for Community Self-Help purchased the building, using one floor to house its Center for Responsible Lending and leasing the other floors. It was listed on the District of Columbia Inventory of Historic Sites in 2012 and on the National Register of Historic Places in 2013. The building was designed by Washington architect B. Stanley Simmons in the Gothic Revival style and named for its developer, John L. Barr. When completed in 1927, the building was noted for having the fastest elevators in the city. The eleven-story structure rises to a height of 110 feet (34 m).
