= Millennium Tower (New York City) =

Residential skyscraper in Manhattan, New York

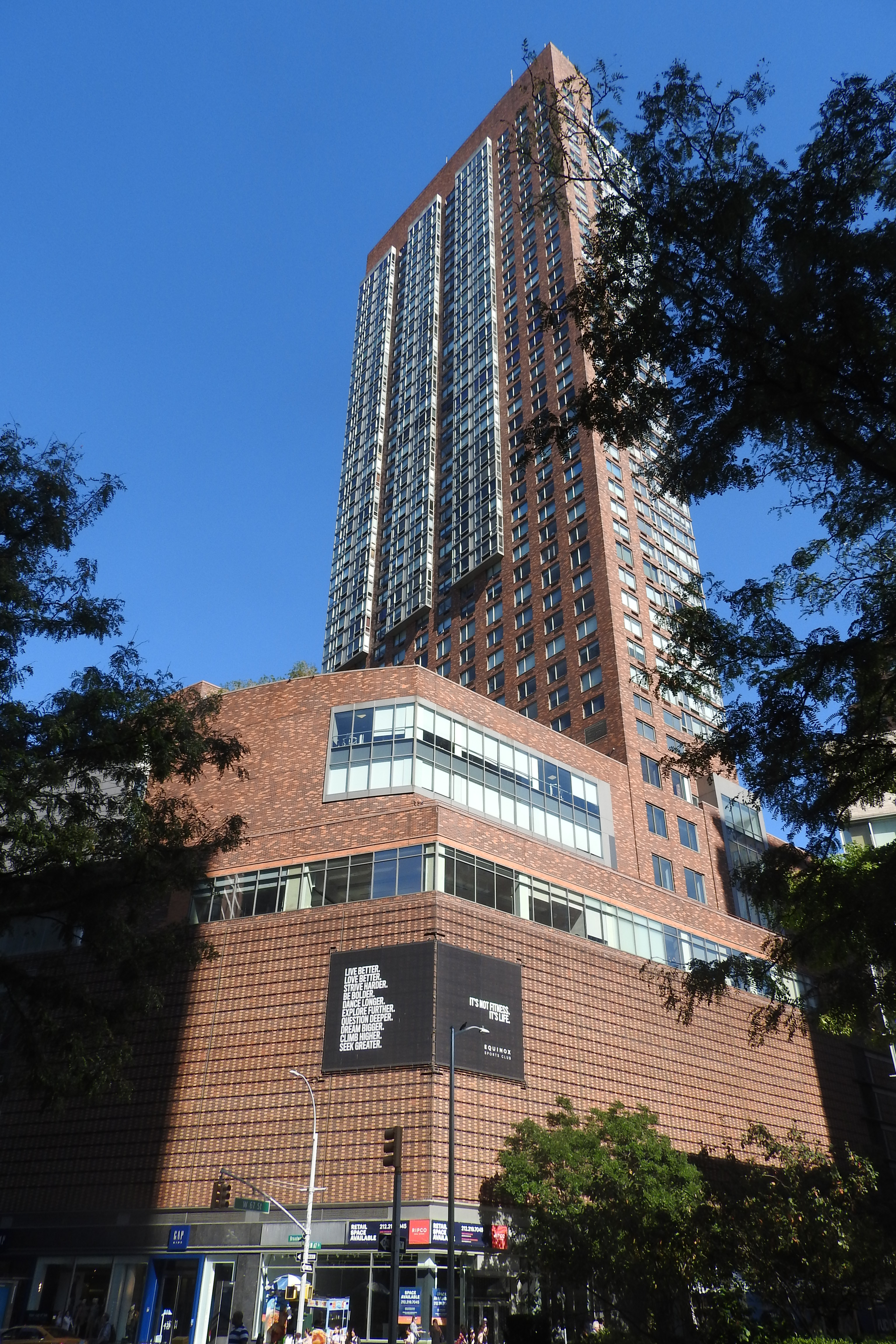
- Interactive map of the Millennium Tower area

General information
- Status: Completed
- Type: Residential
- Location: 101 West 67th Street, Manhattan, New York, U.S.
- Coordinates: 40.774775°N 73.981290°W
- Construction started: 1992
- Completed: 1994

Height
- Architectural: 545 ft (166 m)
- Roof: 545 ft (166 m)

Technical details
- Floor count: 54
- Floor area: 74,322 m^{2} (799,995 sq ft)

Design and construction
- Architects: Kohn Pedersen Fox Associates; SLCE Architects
- Developer: Millennium Partners
- Structural engineer: Rosenwasser/Grossman Consulting Engineers P.C.

Millennium Tower is a mixed-use building in New York City. With the address of 101 West 67th Street, the building occupies the full block bounded by Broadway, Columbus Avenue, and 67th and 68th Streets. It was erected in 1994 and is one of a trio of buildings by Millennium Partners known collectively as Lincoln Square. The building was designed by James Carpenter.

Millennium Tower contains 305 luxury apartments in addition to retail space and a multi-screen cinema. The apartment section begins on the 44th floor.
