= National Metropolitan Bank Building =

- U.S. National Register of Historic Places
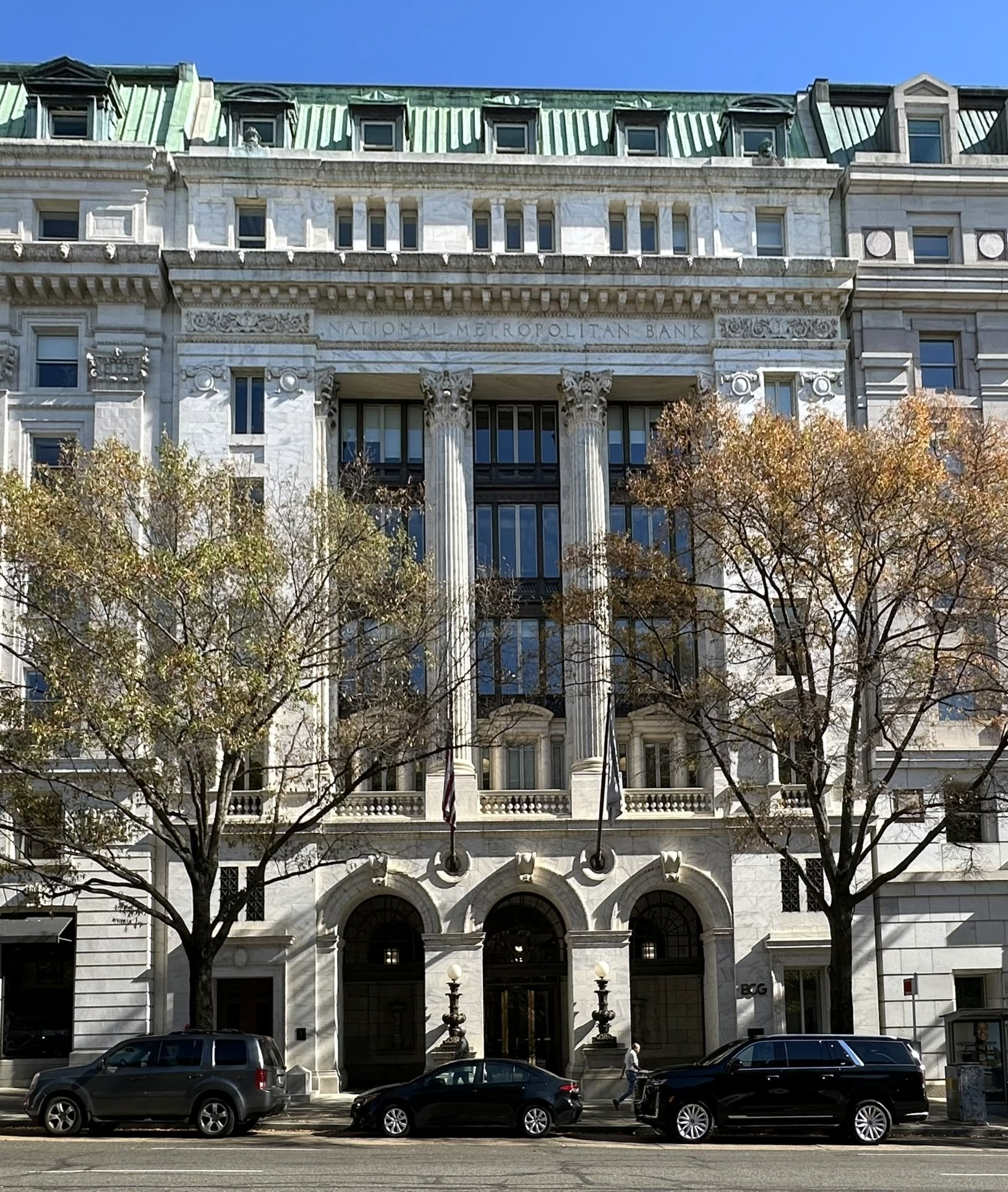
- National Metropolitan Bank Building in 2023

- Location within Washington, D.C.
- Location: 613 15th St., NW; Washington, D.C.
- Coordinates: 38°53′52.3″N 77°1′59.8″W
- Built: 1905-1907
- Architect: B. Stanley Simmons
- Architectural style: Beaux-Arts
- NRHP reference No.: 78003059
- Added to NRHP: September 13, 1978

The National Metropolitan Bank Building is an historic structure located at 655 15th Street, NW in Downtown Washington, D.C.

== History ==
B. Stanley Simmons of the architectural firm of Gordon, Tracy & Swartout designed the Beaux-Arts style building. It was built from 1905 to 1907.

It was listed on the National Register of Historic Places in 1978.

In 1986, its façade was incorporated into a new office building, 'Metropolitan Square', designed by Vlastimil Koubek and Skidmore, Owings & Merrill.
