= Financial Historic District (Washington, D.C.) =

Historic district in Washington, D.C., United States

- U.S. National Register of Historic Places
- U.S. Historic district
- D.C. Inventory of Historic Sites
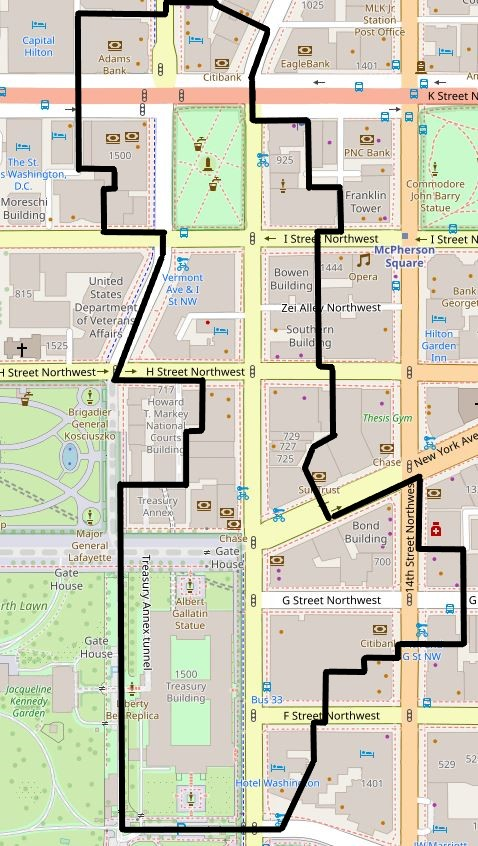
- Financial Historic District map after the 2017 boundary increase
- Location: Original boundary: 15th Street, from Pennsylvania Avenue to I Street NW, Boundary increase: K Street, 14th & G Streets NW; Washington, D.C. U.S.
- Area: 10.7 acres (4.3 ha)
- Architect: Multiple
- Architectural style: Multiple
- NRHP reference No.: 84003900 (original); 100000540 (increase)

Significant dates
- Added to NRHP: October 12, 2006
- Boundary increase: January 12, 2017
- Designated DCIHS: October 5, 1984; July 28, 2016

The Financial Historic District, previously known as the Fifteenth Street Financial Historic District, is a historic district in Washington, D.C. The boundaries of the historic district include 38 buildings, 2 of which are non-contributing properties. Before 2016, the historic district included 20 buildings. The construction of the Treasury Building just east of the White House played a significant role in the financial district's development. Major banks and other financial institutions wanted to be close to the Treasury Building; therefore, many of the historic district's buildings were constructed along 15th Street NW, from Pennsylvania Avenue to I Street.

Many of the buildings on 15th Street were constructed in the Beaux-Arts style, inspired by the City Beautiful movement of the late 1890s and early 1900s. Additional architectural styles represented in the historic district include neoclassical, Colonial Revival, and Renaissance Revival. Architects who designed these buildings included local and national prominent people. Those represented in the historic district include local architects Jules Henri de Sibour, Appleton P. Clark Jr., Waddy Butler Wood, George S. Cooper, Mihran Mesrobian, Paul J. Pelz, George Oakley Totten Jr., and B. Stanley Simmons. Architects from other parts of the country that designed buildings in the historic district include James H. Windrim, Bruce Price, York and Sawyer, Voorhees, Gmelin and Walker, Cass Gilbert, and Carrère and Hastings, amongst others.

The historic district was added to the District of Columbia Inventory of Historic Sites (DCIHS) in 1984, one month after Rhodes' Tavern was demolished after a long legal battle to save the building. The historic district was listed on the National Register of Historic Places (NRHP) in 2006. In 2016 and 2017, the historic district was renamed the Financial Historic District and expanded to better include the historic financial center in downtown Washington, D.C.

Amongst the contributing buildings in the historic district are three National Historic Landmarks: the Lafayette Building, the Treasury Building, and the United Mine Workers of America Building. In addition, there are around 20 additional contributing properties that are individually listed on the NRHP.

== Geography ==
The original historic district was called the Fifteenth Street Financial Historic District. The boundary included buildings along 15th Street NW between Pennsylvania Avenue and McPherson Square in downtown Washington, D.C. The historic district's boundary was modified in 2016 and now includes buildings along 14th Street, F Street, G Street, H Street, I Street, K Street, Madison Place, New York Avenue, and Vermont Avenue, all in the NW quadrant.

The modified boundaries began with the property line behind The Investment Building on the northwest corner of 15th and K Streets, which is the northwest boundary of the historic district. The boundary passes across 15th Street to the property lines behind buildings facing K Street and Vermont Avenue. It then heads south on Vermont Avenue, crossing K Street, and going behind property lines facing McPherson Square. The boundary crosses I Street and goes behind properties facing 15th Street before crossing H Street. It runs behind the properties facing 15th Street and crosses New York Avenue behind the National Savings and Trust Company.

The boundary takes an easterly turn and runs along New York Avenue until 14th Street. It then runs south until the Colorado Building, where it reaches behind the property's line. The boundary crosses G Street and runs behind the Federal-American National Bank on the southeast corner of 14th and G Streets. These two buildings are the eastern boundary of the historic district. The boundary crosses G Street mid-block and runs behind property lines of buildings on the northwest corner of 14th and F Streets, which are not included in the historic district. Mid-block on F Street, the boundary crosses the street and goes behind the properties facing 15th Street, at the southern terminus of the district, Pennsylvania Avenue.

The boundary then runs west, south of the statue of Alexander Hamilton, until reaching Executive Avenue beside the White House. It runs north along this street until the rear property line of the Freedman's Bank Building on Pennsylvania Avenue and Madison Place, before heading north once again. It excludes other buildings on Madison Place that face Lafayette Square, running behind their property lines. Once at H Street, the boundary runs west until Vermont Avenue. It then runs north until I Street, where it again turns west to include the United Mine Workers of America Building and run behind the property lines of buildings facing McPherson Square. The western boundary then runs north and meets at the original northwest boundary location.

== History ==
=== 19th century ===
The financial history of the historic district began in 1799 when the first U.S. Treasury building was constructed on 15th Street NW, east of the White House. In 1824, the Second Bank of the United States built a branch on the corner of 15th Street and Pennsylvania Avenue NW, though the bank lost its federal charter in 1836. The building was later occupied by Corcoran and Riggs, the precursor to Riggs Bank. That same year construction started on the new Treasury Building after the first one was destroyed by arson.

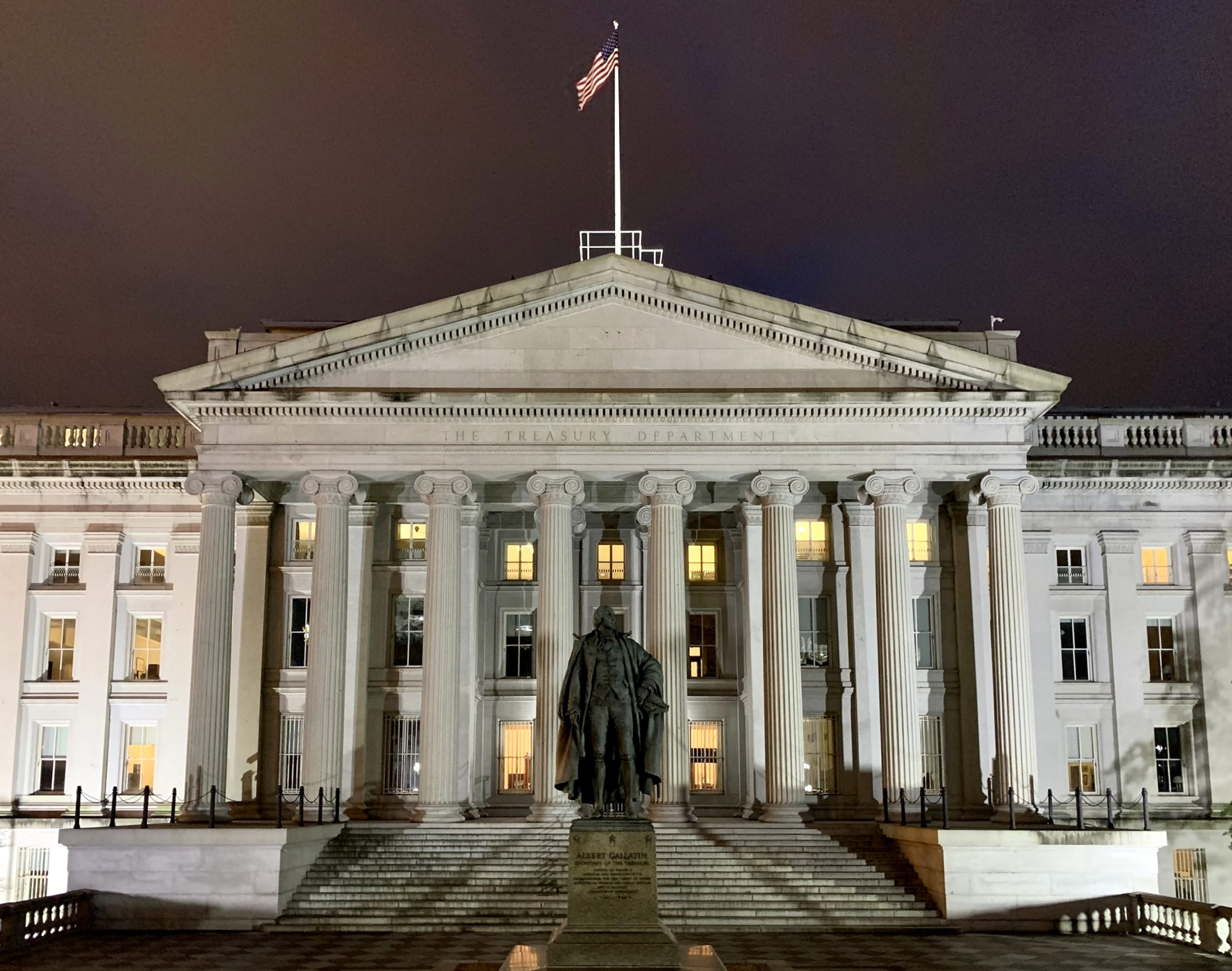
The Treasury Building was built in four stages from 1836 to 1869.

The east wing and central portion of the new Greek Revival Treasury Building was designed by Robert Mills, who would later design the Washington Monument. The building was constructed across the street from Rhodes' Tavern, erected in 1799 and home to the Bank of the Metropolis, which moved one block north in 1836. The tavern was then occupied by Riggs Bank from 1837 to 1845. The gradual transition of 15th Street NW to a financial district occurred in the 19th century, mostly due to the Treasury Building and banks desiring to be near it. The Corcoran Building was constructed in the late 1840s on a lot between F Street and Pennsylvania Avenue NW.

Residences that had been built in the financial area were razed and replaced with commercial properties as the downtown area of the city shifted west from 4th Street and Pennsylvania Avenue. The Treasury Building was enlarged from 1855–1861 after Ammi B. Young and Alexander Hamilton Bowman designed the south wing. During the Civil War the Treasury Building was enlarged again after Isaiah Rogers designed the west wing. The final expansion of the Treasury Building, the north wing, was designed by Alfred B. Mullett and completed in 1869. The building became the central feature of the city's banking industry and represents the first phase of the financial district's growth.

The Corcoran Building was demolished and replaced with a larger version in 1875. Beginning in the 1880s, the current financial district grew rapidly. The National Savings and Trust Company, designed by James H. Windrim in 1888, is an example of Queen Anne style architecture and one of the most imposing buildings in the historic district. The next imposing financial building that opened at the intersection of 15th Street and Pennsylvania Avenue NW was the headquarters of Riggs National Bank. The neoclassical building was designed by York and Sawyer in 1898.

=== 20th century ===
==== 1900s to 1940s ====
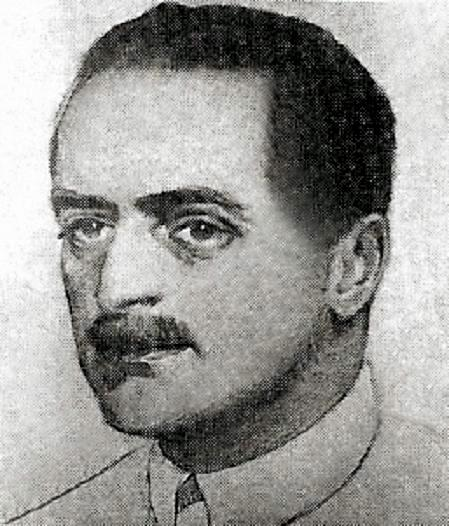
Jules Henri de Sibour designed several buildings in the historic district.

After the World's Columbian Exposition in 1893, the City Beautiful movement began, and Beaux-Arts architecture became a popular style throughout the country, especially in Washington, D.C. This represented the second phase of the financial district's development. The first Beaux-Arts building in the financial district, the Bond Building at 14th and New York Avenue NW, was designed by George S. Cooper. Banks had a desire to build imposing, grand headquarters and branches to display their financial success, and Beaux-Arts was seen as the grandest style of the time. In addition to the Bond Building, this was shown in the 1900s with construction of the Colorado Building at 14th and G Streets NW, designed by Ralph S. Townsend in 1902; the National Metropolitan Bank Building built in 1907 and designed by B. Stanley Simmons; and the W. B. Hibbs and Company Building, constructed in 1908 and designed by Bruce Price and Jules Henri de Sibour.

Buildings constructed in the 1900s in the financial district that are not Beaux-Arts include the neoclassical style Keith-Albee Building, designed by de Sibour, and the Union Trust Building, designed by Wood, Donn & Deming. The one vernacular style building on 15th Street is the Swartzell, Rheem and Hensey Company Building, completed in 1908 and designed by Paul J. Pelz.

The 1910s saw continued growth in the city's banking industry; therefore new elaborate buildings were constructed in the financial district. The Southern Building, designed by D. H. Burnham & Company in the Renaissance Revival style, features terra cotta details. The Federal-American National Bank, designed by de Sibour and Alfred Bossom, is a neoclassical building that is one of three surviving banking properties at the intersection of 14th and G Streets NW, the others being the Colorado Building and Commercial National Bank, designed by Waddy Butler Wood. Another neoclassical building constructed that decade is the Liberty National Bank, designed by Holmes and Winslow.

Additional buildings that were constructed in the 1910s and are examples of the Renaissance Revival style are the Woodward Building, designed by Harding & Upman, and the United Mine Workers of America Building, designed by George Oakley Totten Jr. Beaux-Arts buildings constructed in the 1910s include Hotel Washington, which replaced the Corcoran Building and was designed by Carrère and Hastings, and the Treasury Annex, which replaced the Freedman's Savings Bank at the corner of Madison Place and Lafayette Square and was designed by Cass Gilbert.

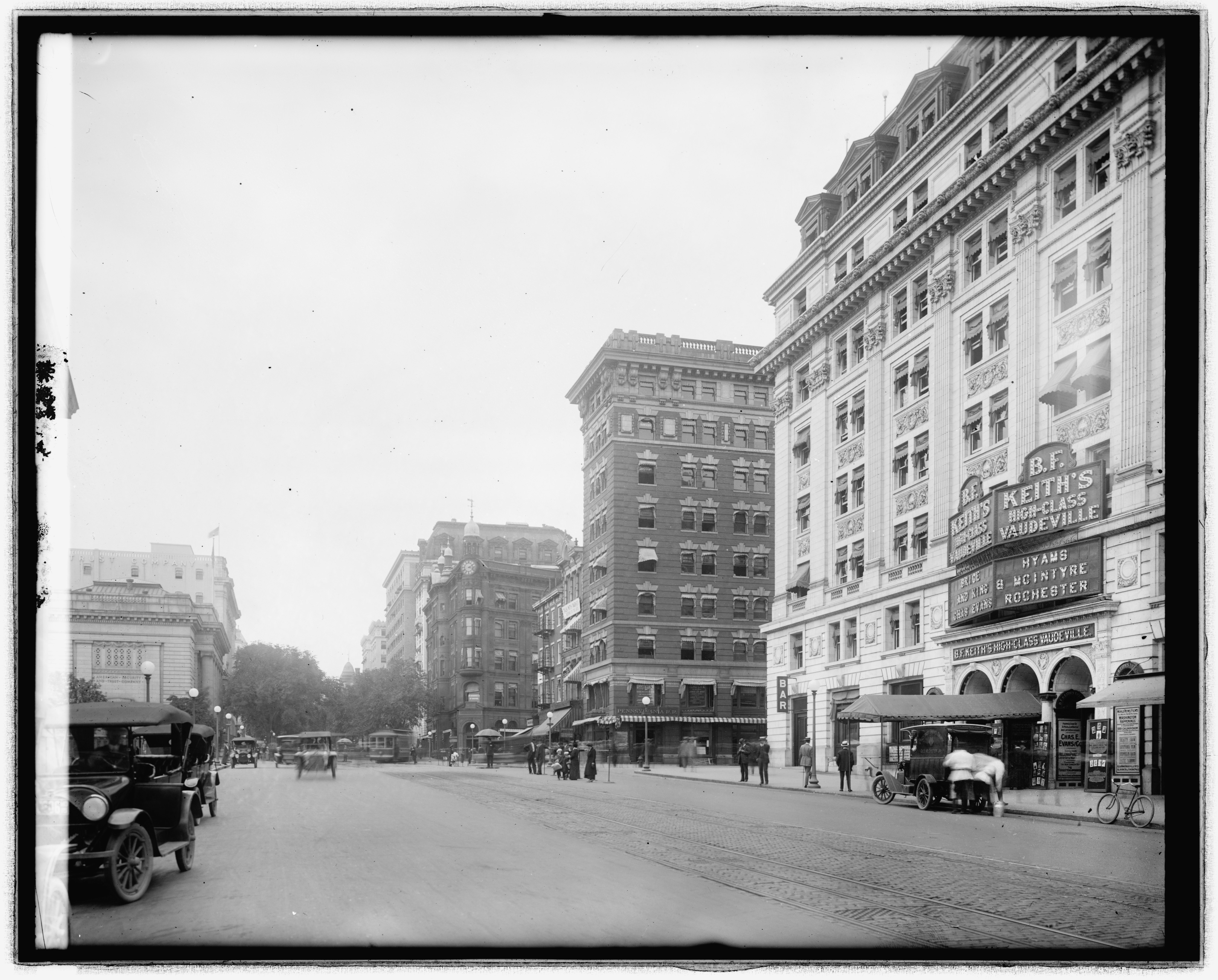
15th Street NW in the late 1910s

The early 20th century saw a gradual shift of McPherson Square transitioning from being a residential area to a commercial one. The Davidson Building, designed by Simmons, was constructed in 1917 in the colonial revival style. It would become the first of many new commercial properties facing the square. Another Colonial Revival commercial property, the Colonial Mortgage Building, was built in 1924 and designed by George N. Ray. It was during the 1920s that many of the buildings in the financial district were constructed.

The Denrike Building, designed by Appleton P. Clark Jr., is a Gothic Revival property in the financial district and was completed in 1926. Renaissance Revival buildings completed in the 1920s are the Bowen Building and The Investment Building, both designed by de Sibour, the Shoreham Building, designed by Mihran Mesrobian, and Second National Bank, designed by Clark Jr. Neoclassical buildings constructed in the 1920s are the Edmonds Building, designed by Eugene Waggaman, the B.F. Saul Building, designed by George N. Ray, the Washington Building, designed by Coolidge, Shepley, Bulfinch and Abbott, the Peyser Building, designed by Ray, and the Southern Railway Building, designed by Wood. One exception to the common architectural styles represented in the financial district is the Securities Building, which was designed in the Jacobethan style and designed by the Wardman Construction Company.

Only three buildings in the financial district that were constructed in the 1930s remain: the neoclassical American Security Building designed by York and Sawyer, the Art Deco Walker Building designed by Porter and Lockie, and the neoclassical Lafayette Building, designed by A.R. Clas Associates and Holabird & Root. The last building to be included in the historic district is the modernist Wire Building, designed by Alvin L. Aubinoe and completed in 1949.

==== 1950s to 1990s ====
In the 1960s, 1510 H Street NW was heavily damaged due to an adjoining construction accident to the property and was later demolished in the 1980s. On October 15, 1966, the Pennsylvania Avenue National Historic Site was added to the National Register of Historic Places (NRHP). A portion of the Fifteenth Street Historic District was included in the National Historic Site, with the Treasury Building and Hotel Washington designated as contributing properties.

In the late 1970s and 1980s, a dispute occurred between historic preservationists and real estate developers that wanted to demolish Rhodes Tavern, then the oldest commercial building in downtown Washington, D.C. A court ruled in 1980 that the tavern could be demolished to make way for a $75 million mixed-use project called Metropolitan Square. The following year the District of Columbia Court of Appeals rejected an appeal of the decision. In late 1981 the United States Supreme Court refused to hear a petition that would overturn the D.C. Court of Appeals's decision. There was a potential compromise to move the building, but preservationists insisted it stay in the same place.

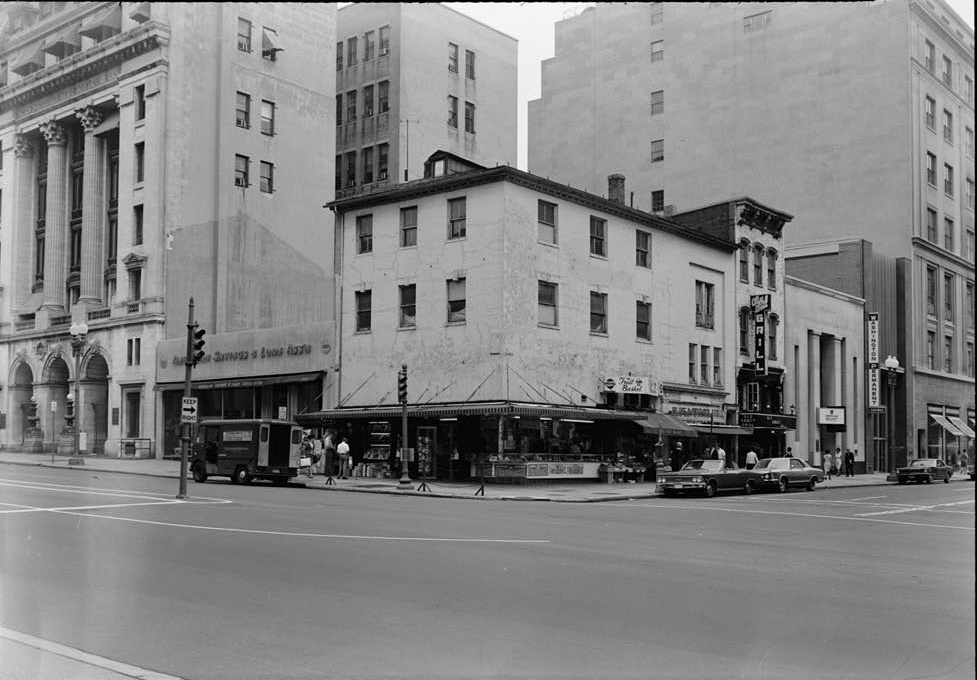
Rhodes' Tavern in 1967

Legal battling between the two sides continued into the mid-1980s. After the U.S. Supreme Court again denied an appeal by preservationists in 1984, the group realized they were out of legal options. The Fifteenth Street Historic District the city listed on the District of Columbia Inventory of Historic Sites (DCIHS) in 1984 did not take legal effect until October 5, 1984. The building was demolished in September 1984 after the D.C. Court of Appeals lifted an injunction that prevented local officials from razing Rhodes Tavern. The façades of the Keith-Albee Building and the National Metropolitan Bank Building were preserved, and construction of Metropolitan Square was later completed. Fifteen years later a memorial plaque was added to the site where Rhodes Tavern once stood.

In 1988, there was another legal battle about historic preservation in the historic district when city officials approved a demolition request for the Woodward Building, despite it being a contributing property. A leader of a local historic preservation group said "There is no sanctity left in historic designations if this sort of thing can happen. It just makes a mockery of the preservation law." With assistance from the Committee of 100 on the Federal City, preservationists continued a legal battle for the next two years. The building was ultimately saved.

=== 21st century ===
The Fifteenth Street Historic District that had been listed on the DCIHS on October 5, 1984, was added to the NRHP on October 12, 2006. The historic district was expanded in 2016 to include a larger portion of the city's financial district, not just the ones on 15th Street NW. The renamed Financial Historic District was added to the DCIHS on July 28, 2016, and the NRHP on January 12, 2017. The number of contributing properties increased from 20 to 36. Two buildings in the historic district were constructed in the late 20th century and are non-contributing: 901 15th Street NW and 1015 15th Street NW.

== List of contributing buildings ==
#	Image	Address	Year	Style	Comments
1		Commercial National Bank; 38°53′54.07″N 77°1′55.21″W	1917	Neoclassical	Designed by Waddy Butler Wood. Individually listed on the NRHP in 1991.
2		National Metropolitan Bank Building; 38°53′52.05″N 77°02′01.84″W	1905–1907	Beaux-Arts	Designed by B. Stanley Simmons and Gordon, Tracy & Swartwout. Individually listed on the National Register of Historic Places (NRHP) in 1978.
3		Keith-Albee Building; 38°53′52.97″N 77°02′01.29″W	1911–1912	Beaux-Arts	Designed by Jules Henri de Sibour. Individually listed on the NRHP in 1978.
4		National Savings and Trust Company; 38°53′57.2″N 77°02′00.0″W	1887–1888	Queen Anne	Designed by James H. Windrim. Individually listed on the NRHP in 1972.
5		W. B. Hibbs and Company Building; 38°53′57.66″N 77°02′01.65″W	1906–1908	Beaux-Arts	Designed by Bruce Price and Jules Henri de Sibour. Individually listed on the NRHP in 1991.
6		Swartzell, Rheem and Hensey Company Building; 38°53′58.41″N 77°02′02″W	1907–1908	Vernacular	Designed by Paul J. Pelz. Formerly the Playhouse Theatre. Newer addition was built in 1984.
7		Securities Building; 38°53′59.63″N 77°02′01.18″W	1925–1926	Jacobethan	Designed and built by the Wardman Construction Company
8		730 15th Street NW; 38°53′57.6″N 77°02′02.3″W	1930–1931	Neoclassical	Designed by York and Sawyer. Built as an addition to the American Security and Trust Company Building.
9		Woodward Building; 38°54′00.99″N 77°02′01.62″W	1911	Renaissance Revival	Designed by Harding & Upman.
10		Walker Building; 38°53′58.4″N 77°02′01.8″W	1936–1937	Art Deco	Designed by Porter and Lockie.
11		Shoreham Building; 38°54′00.14″N 77°02′01.65″W	1928–1929	Renaissance Revival	Designed by Mihran Mesrobian. Now the Sofitel Washington, D.C. Lafayette Square.
12		Bowen Building; 38°54′05.03″N 77°02′02.03″W	1922	Renaissance Revival	Designed by Jules Henri de Sibour. Additions designed by Voorhees, Gmelin and Walker and Philip M. Jullien in 1935 and 1939, respectively.
13		Liberty National Bank; 38°54′05.03″N 77°02′02.03″W	1919	Neoclassical	Designed by Holmes and Winslow. Addition in 1956.
14		United Mine Workers of America Building; 38°54′04.66″N 77°02′04.17″W	1912	Renaissance Revival	Designed by George Oakley Totten Jr. Individually listed on the NRHP in 2000. Designated a National Historic Landmark (NHL) in 2005.
15		Edmonds Building; 38°54′06.98″N 77°02′01.59″W	1921–1922	Neoclassical	Designed by Eugene Waggaman
16		Colonial Mortgage Building; 38°54′07.01″N 77°02′01.4″W	1924	Colonial Revival	Designed by George N. Ray.
17		B.F. Saul Building; 38°54′07.63″N 77°02′01.4″W	1924	Neoclassical	Designed by George N. Ray. Individually listed on the NRHP in 2016.
18		Davidson Building; 38°54′08.74″N 77°02′01.45″W	1917	Colonial Revival	Designed by B. Stanley Simmons. Individually listed on the NRHP in 2016.
19		Hotel Washington; 38°53′49.1″N 77°1′59.8″W	1917	Beaux-Arts	Designed by Carrère and Hastings. Individually listed on the NRHP in 1995.
20		Second National Bank; 38°53′54.8″N 77°1′52.5″W	1927–1928	Renaissance Revival	Designed by Appleton P. Clark Jr. Individually listed on the NRHP in 1994.
21		Colorado Building; 38°53′53.59″N 77°01′55.41″W	1902–1903	Beaux-Arts	Designed by Ralph S. Townsend.
22		Federal-American National Bank; 38°53′53.69″N 77°01′55.49″W	1924–1926	Neoclassical	Designed by Alfred Bossom and Jules Henri de Sibour. Individually listed on the NRHP in 1994.
23		Southern Building; 38°54′00.44″N 77°02′01.76″W	1910–1912	Renaissance Revival	Designed by D. H. Burnham & Company.
24		Union Trust Building; 38°53′59.7″N 77°02′2.1″W	1906–1907	Neoclassical	Designed by Wood, Donn & Deming. Individually listed on the NRHP in 1984.
25		Southern Railway Building; 38°54′09.77″N 77°02′07.61″W	1928–1929	Neoclassical	Designed by Waddy Butler Wood. Individually listed on the NRHP in 2016.
26		The Investment Building; 38°54′08.92″N 77°02′03.87″W	1923–1924	Renaissance Revival	Designed by Jules Henri de Sibour. Façade was incorporated into a new building completed in 2001 and designed by César Pelli.
27		Peyser Building; 38°54′09.89″N 77°02′07.5″W	1927–1928	Neoclassical	Designed by George N. Ray. Individually listed on the NRHP in 2012.
28		Bond Building; 38°53′58.56″N 77°01′54.18″W	1900–1901	Beaux-Arts	Designed by George S. Cooper. Individually listed on the NRHP in 1980.
29		Washington Building; 38°53′56.23″N 77°02′01.23″W	1926–1929	Neoclassical	Designed by Coolidge, Shepley, Bulfinch and Abbott.
30		Treasury Building; 38°53′51.2″N 77°2′3.4″W	1836–1871	Greek Revival	Designed by Robert Mills, Ammi B. Young, Alexander Hamilton Bowman, Isaiah Rogers, and Alfred B. Mullett. Individually listed on the NRHP and designated a NHL in 1971.
31		U.S. Treasury Annex; 38°53′56.8″N 77°02′5.3″W	1917–1919	Beaux-Arts	Designed by Cass Gilbert.
32		American Security and Trust Company Building; 38°53′56.5″N 77°02′2.1″W	1904–1905	Neoclassical	Designed by York and Sawyer. Individually listed on the NRHP in 1973.
33		Riggs National Bank; 38°53′56.5″N 77°02′2.8″W	1899–1902	Neoclassical	Designed by York and Sawyer. Individually listed on the NRHP in 1973.
34		Lafayette Building; 38°54′2.8″N 77°02′4.0″W	1939	Neoclassical	Designed by A.R. Clas Associates and Holabird & Root. Individually listed on the NRHP and designated a NHL in 2005.
35		Wire Building; 38°54′08.9″N 77°2′01.32″W	1949	Modern	Designed by Aubinoe & Edwards. Individually listed on the NRHP in 2013.
36		Denrike Building; 38°54′08.84″N 77°02′00.47″W	1925–26	Gothic Revival	Designed by Appleton P. Clark Jr. Individually listed on the NRHP in 2016.

== See also ==
- National Register of Historic Places listings in Washington, D.C.
