= Union Trust Building (Washington, D.C.) =

- U.S. National Register of Historic Places
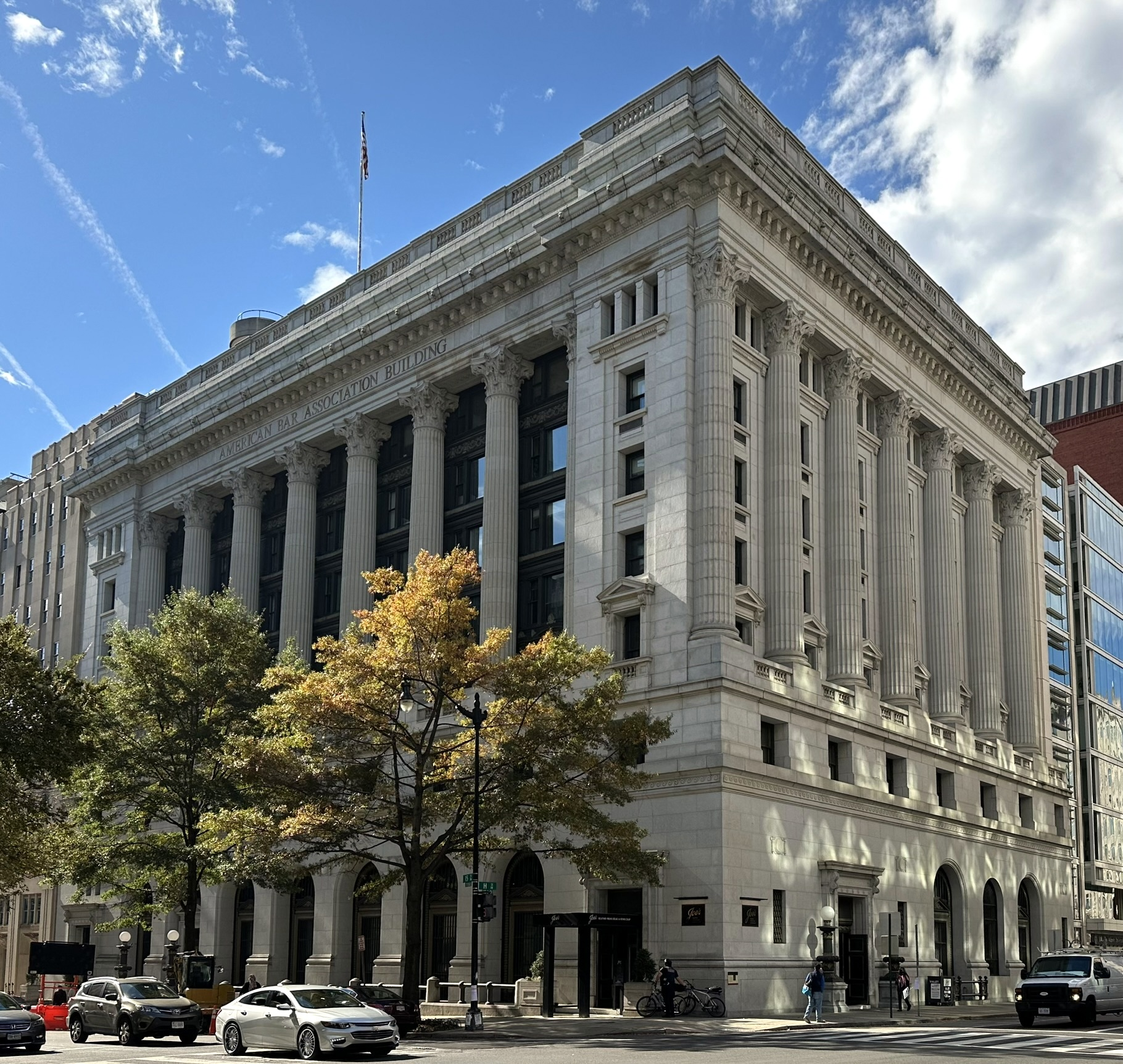
- Union Trust Building in 2023

- Location within Central Washington, D.C. Location within the District of Columbia Location within the United States
- Location: 740 15th Street, N.W., Washington, D. C.
- Coordinates: 38°53′59.7″N 77°2′2.1″W
- Architect: Wood, Donn, and Deming
- Architectural style: Neoclassical
- NRHP reference No.: 84000867

The Union Trust Building is a nine-story office building at 740 15th Street Northwest in Washington, D.C. It was built between 1906 and 1907 by the Union Trust Company, It was the first bank designed by Waddy Butler Wood, touching off a trend of DC banks using local architects.

The building was expanded in 1927 and again in 1983 during its renovation as a modern office building. It is listed on the National Register of Historic Places, and is a contributing property to the Financial Historic District.

It sits on the site of Wormley's Hotel, where the Compromise of 1877 was reached, ending Reconstruction and electing President Rutherford B. Hayes.

== History ==
Union Trust was a trust bank founded in 1899 as the Union Trust and Storage Company by a group of investors led by George Hamilton and Edward J. Stellwagen. Stellwagen was the president of the Thomas J. Fisher Companies, a real estate and mortgage brokerage closely affiliated with Senator Francis G. Newlands. The company was in part organized to act as the fiduciary for investment by Williams Deacon's Bank to the Chevy Chase Land Company, the real estate development company founded by a partnership led by Newlands, who invested money his wife inherited from her father, William Sharon. As was common at the time, the distinction between Union Trust, the Chevy Chase Land Company, and the Fisher Companies was blurred. During its early years, the Fisher Companies' brokerage office was located off a separate door at the south end of the building, and the Land Company kept offices as a tenant above.

Union Trust, after several mergers, became First American Bancorp before being purchased by First Union Bank.

Tenants have included the American Planning and Civic Association and Covington & Burling, which had its offices in the Old Union Trust Building in 1940, when Gerhard Gesell joined the firm (according to his unpublished 1984 memoir). The site is now home to the New America Foundation.

== Construction ==
The Union Trust Building was designed in 1906 by Waddy Butler Wood of Wood, Donn & Deming, who became the first Washington, D.C. architect to design a bank high-rise in the city. In the past, the city's largest banks had each retained nationally renowned architects, while local architects were only chosen to design bank branches or remodel existing buildings. By choosing Wood's firm, Union Trust began a trend of the city's banks choosing local architects to design their buildings.

The building is faced in Mount Airy granite, with bronze and glass details.

First American Bancorp hired Keyes Condon Florance to renovate the building between 1980 and 1983, modernizing the building and reconfiguring the building from the second level up.

== See also ==
- National Register of Historic Places listings in Washington, D.C.
