= Hotel Washington (Washington, D.C.) =

Hotel in downtown Washington, D.C.

- U.S. National Register of Historic Places
- U.S. Historic district – Contributing property
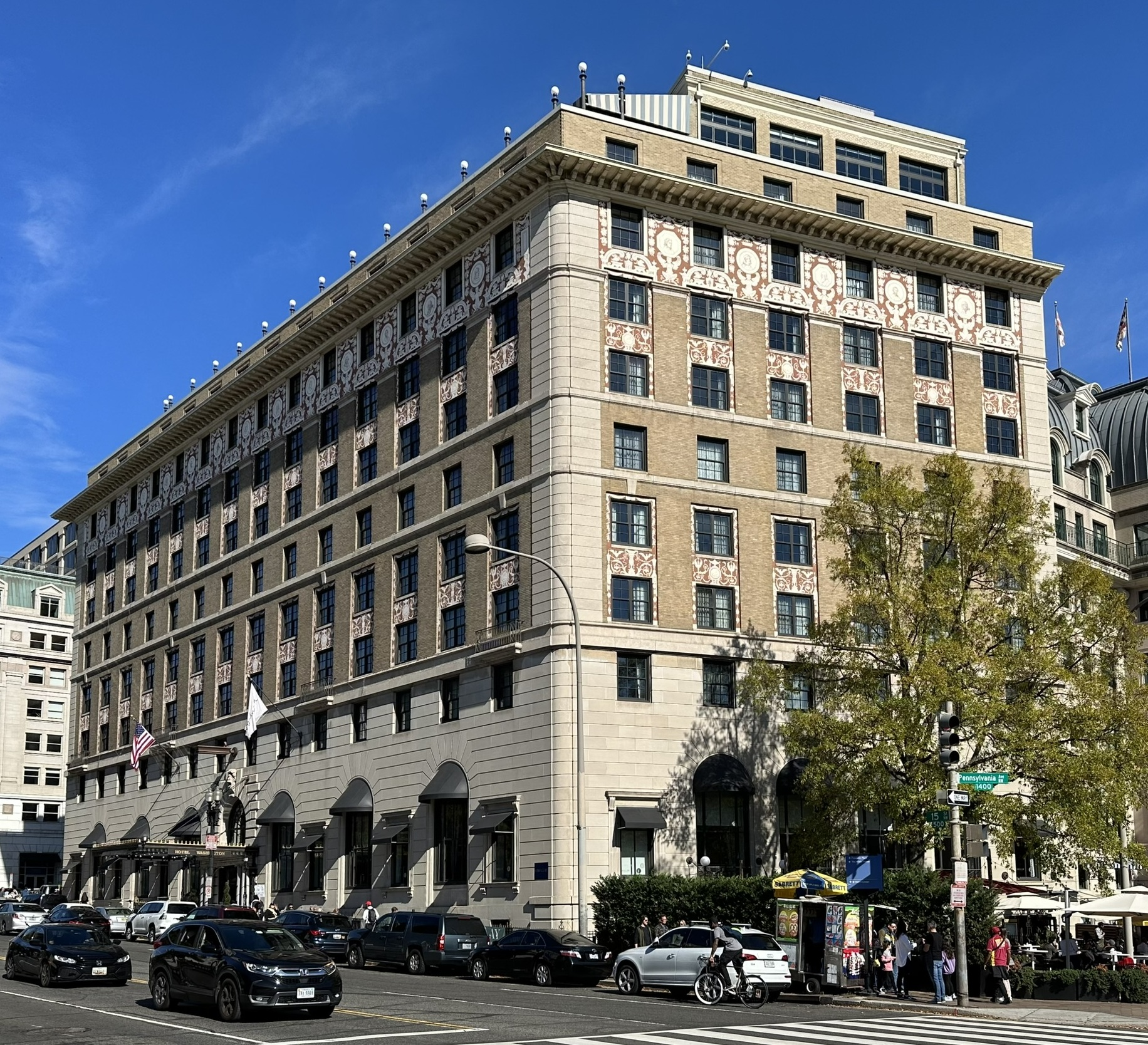
- View across Pennsylvania Avenue, looking up 15th Street (2023)

- Location within Central Washington, D.C. Location within the District of Columbia Location within the United States
- Location: 515 15th Street, N.W., Washington, D.C.
- Coordinates: 38°53′49.1″N 77°1′59.8″W
- Built: 1918
- Architect: Carrère and Hastings
- Architectural style: Beaux Arts
- NRHP reference No.: 95000352
- Added to NRHP: March 30, 1995

The Hotel Washington is a historic hotel located at 515 15th Street NW (between Pennsylvania Avenue and F Street) in downtown Washington, D.C.

== History ==
The Hotel Washington opened on April 4, 1918. Designed by the architectural firm of Carrère and Hastings, the ten-story, Beaux-Arts hotel is the only commercial building designed by the firm in Washington, D.C. The facade features cream colored sgraffito decoration on a reddish-brown ground.

The Hotel Washington was listed on the National Register of Historic Places (NRHP) in 1995; in addition, the building is a contributing property to the Financial Historic District, listed on the NRHP in 2006, and the Pennsylvania Avenue National Historic Site.

On 14 October 2005, George H. W. Bush, Barbara Bush and Eunice Kennedy Shriver attended a press conference at the hotel to unveil The Extra Mile - Points of Light Volunteer Pathway. It is a mile-long pathway of bronze medallions on 15th Street. Various staff members from the Corporation for National and Community Service and AmeriCorps NCCC attended the event at the hotel. After the press conference concluded, Pres. Bush, Mrs. Bush and Mrs. Kennedy Shriver walked up 15th street to see the medallions.

Texas businessman William Lewis Moody Jr. bought the hotel in 1940. The hotel remained in the family for decades, and his grandson, controversial businessman Shearn Moody Jr., was often seen there in the 1980s.

The Moody family company, Gal-Tex, sold the hotel in early 2006, to Westbrook Partners for $120 million. They quickly resold the hotel, in October 2006, to Istithmar World for $150 million. The new owners closed the hotel in November 2007 and undertook an extensive renovation. It reopened on October 8, 2009 as the 317-room W Washington D.C.

In 2015, Investment Corporation of Dubai purchased the hotel.

In 2021 the hotel was sold to Schulte Hospitality Group & Pimco for $147 million. They ended its franchise with W Hotels and returned the hotel to its historic name, Hotel Washington.

== In popular culture ==
The hotel was seen in the films Silkwood, Contact and The Firm. The hotel's roof terrace cafe was a location in the movies The Godfather Part II, No Way Out and Wonder Woman 1984. Frank Murphy and John Nance Garner lived there.
