= National Savings and Trust Company =

- U.S. National Register of Historic Places
- U.S. Historic district – Contributing property
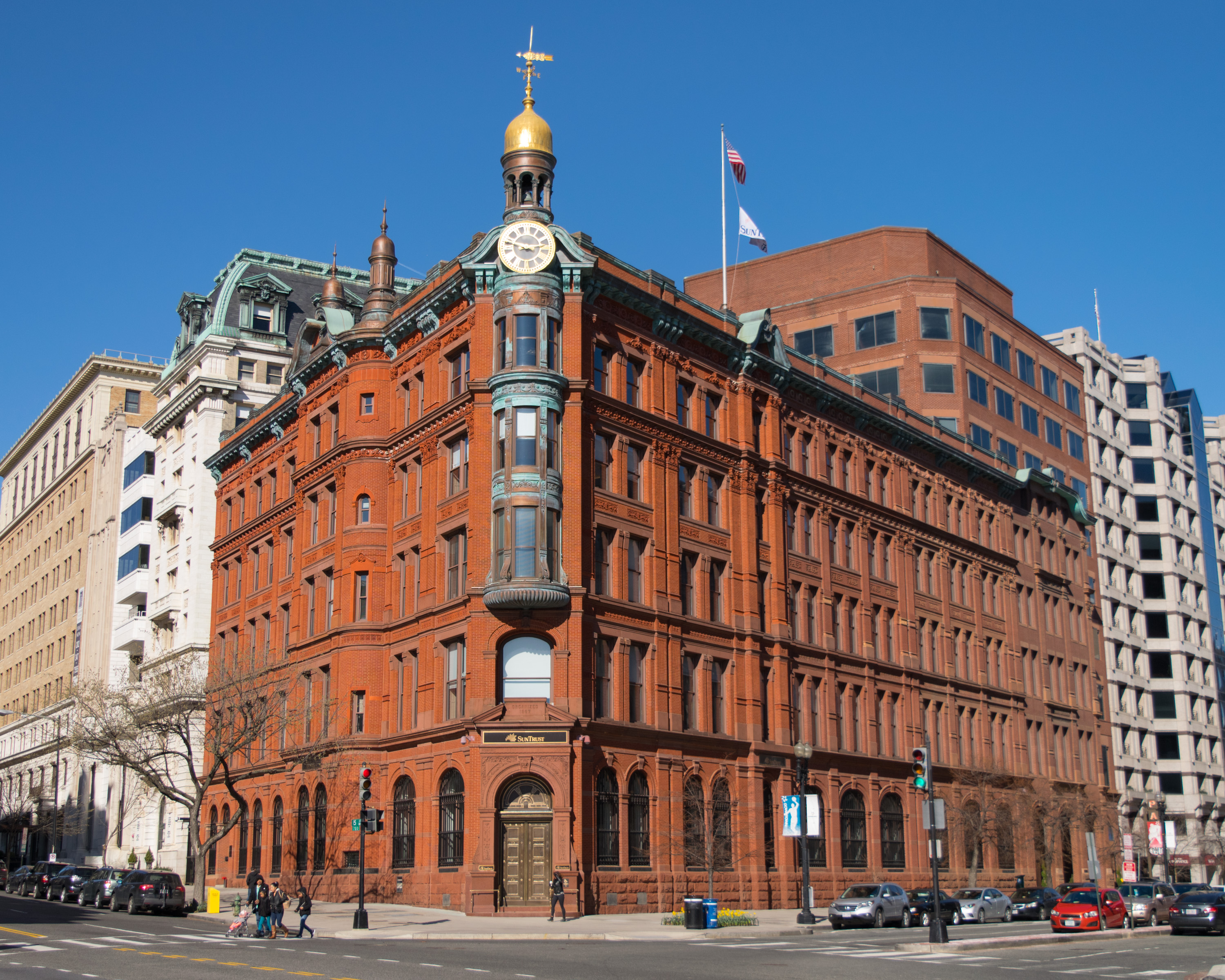
- National Savings and Trust Company in 2017

- Location within Central Washington, D.C. Location within the District of Columbia Location within the United States
- Location: New York Avenue and 15th Street, NW, Washington, D.C.
- Coordinates: 38°53′57.2″N 77°2′0″W
- Built: 1888
- Architect: James H. Windrim
- Architectural style: Queen Anne Style
- NRHP reference No.: 72001428
- Added to NRHP: March 16, 1972

The National Savings and Trust Company is a historic bank building located at the corner of New York Avenue and 15th Street, NW in Downtown Washington, D.C. It has also been known as the National Safe Deposit Company and the National Safe Deposit Savings and Trust Company.

== History ==
It was designed by architect James H. Windrim and built in 1888. The Queen Anne Style building is constructed in red brick, and elaborately detailed with copper and terra cotta.

The building was added to the National Register of Historic Places on March 16, 1972, and is a contributing property to the Financial Historic District.

As of 2024, the building was occupied by a branch of Truist, based in Charlotte, North Carolina. Truist's predecessor SunTrust Banks had taken ownership of the structure when it acquired Crestar Bank, which itself had previously taken control of the National Savings and Trust Company.

== See also ==
- National Register of Historic Places listings in the District of Columbia
