= Davidson Building (Washington, D.C.) =

Historic building in Washington, D.C., US

- U.S. National Register of Historic Places
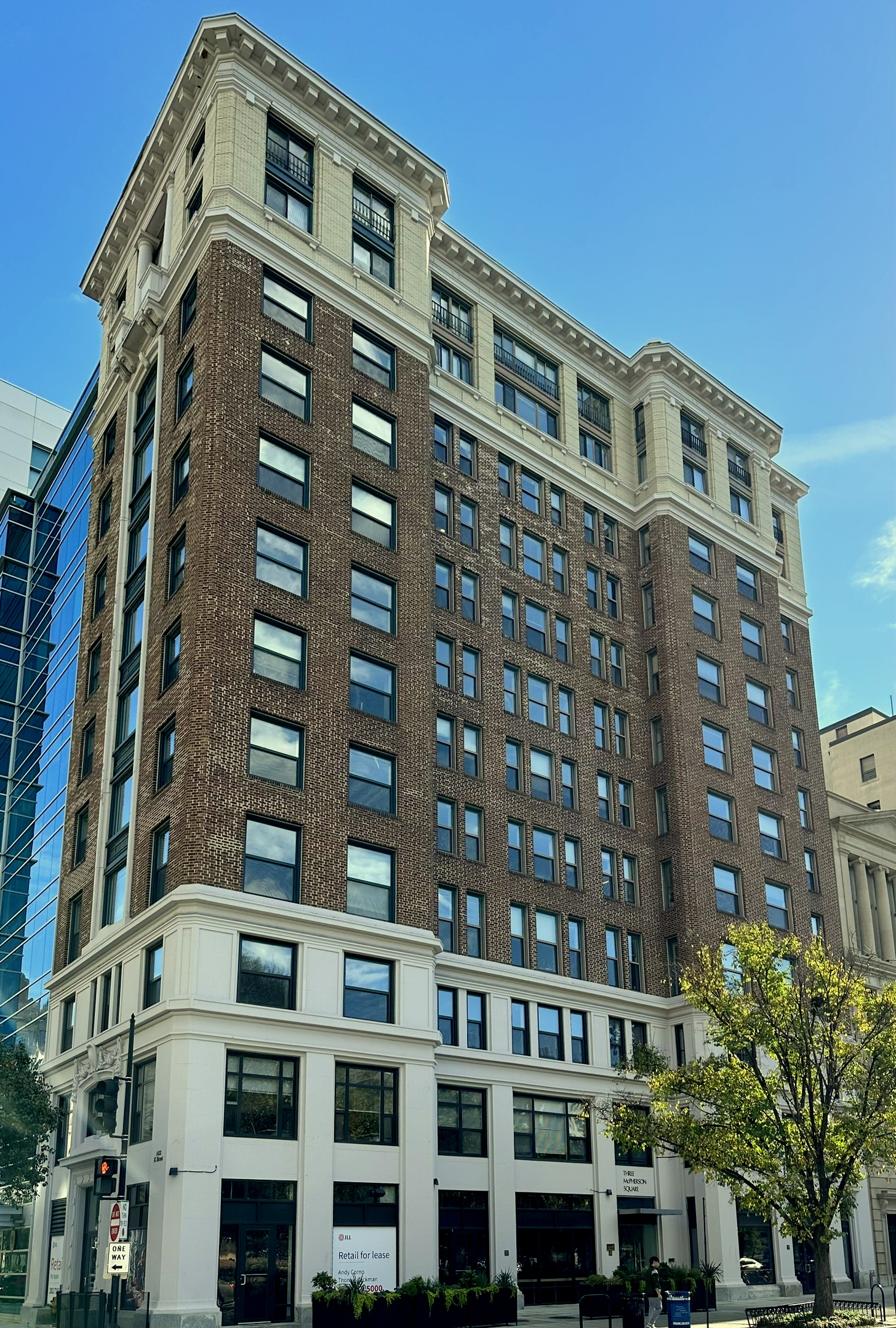
- The Davidson Building in 2023

- Location within Central Washington, D.C. Location within the District of Columbia Location within the United States
- Location: 927 15th Street NW, Washington, DC, 20005
- Coordinates: 38°54′08″N 77°02′00″W
- Built: 1917
- Architectural style: Renaissance Revival
- NRHP reference No.: 16000683
- Added to NRHP: October 4, 2016

The Davidson Building, currently designated as Three McPherson Square, is a historic office building in Washington, D.C., United States at 927 15th Street Northwest, adjacent to McPherson Square, built in 1917. At twelve stories and 130 ft (40 m) tall, it was the tallest building in the city from its completion until 1926. Located within the Financial Historic District, the building was added to the District of Columbia Inventory of Historic Sites on July 28, 2016 and the National Register of Historic Places on October 4.

The building has also been referred to as the Phillips Building between 1923 and 1929 and the Carry Building from 1929 to 1965.

== Architecture ==
The Davidson Building was designed by local architect B. Stanley Simmons and is built with Renaissance Revival-style architecture.

== History ==
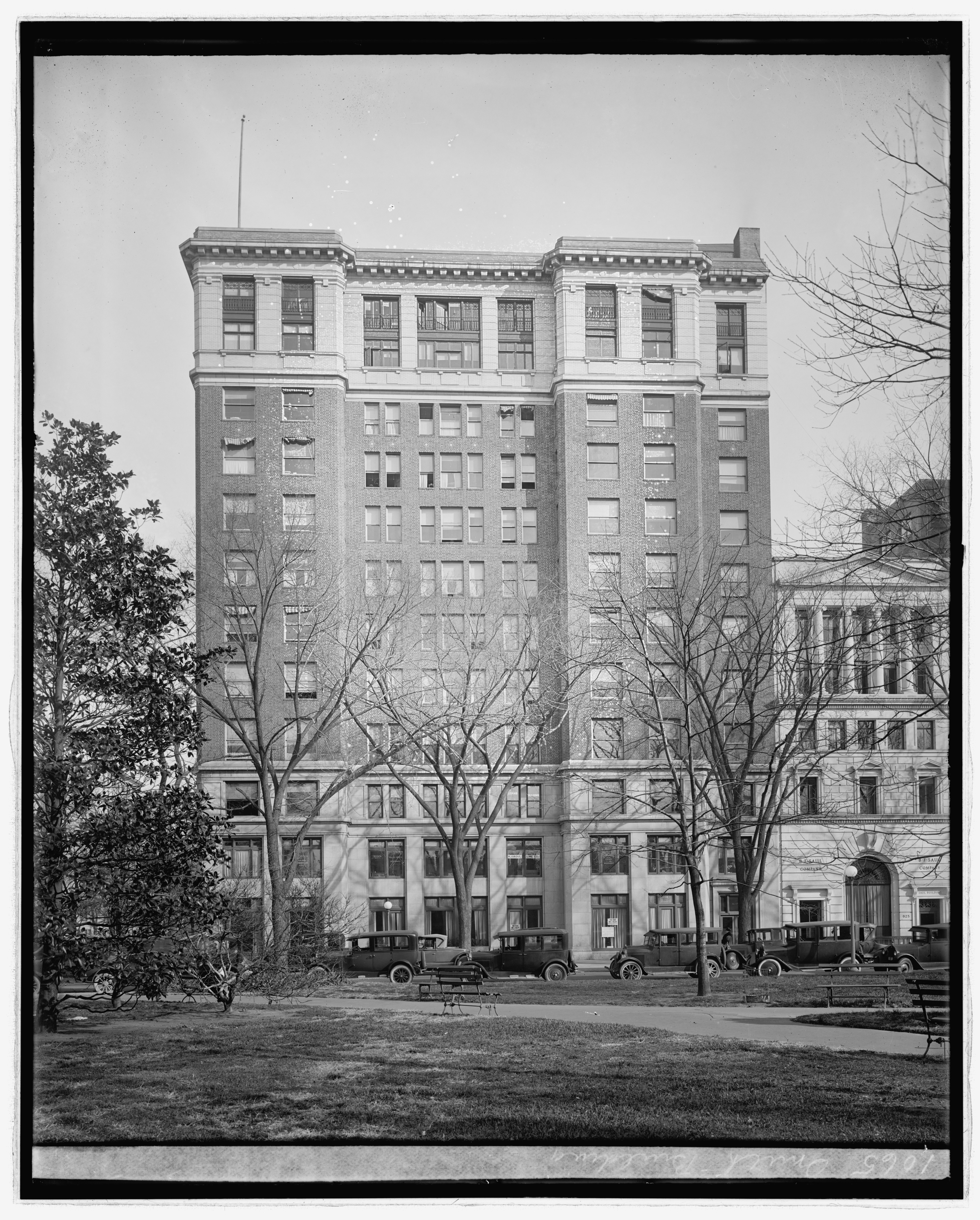
The Davison Building in the early 20th century

=== Construction ===
Construction of the Davidson Building broke ground in 1917 and was completed that same year. Upon completion, the twelve story, 130 ft (40 m)-tall office building was the tallest building in Washington, D.C. before it was surpassed in height by the National Press Building in 1926. The Davidson Building was the first multi-story purpose-built office building to replace a pre-existing residential building at McPherson Square—among multiple others that would soon appear throughout the 1920s—as Washington's Financial District expanded north and replaced the residential neighborhood that surrounded the square.

=== Ownership and tenants ===
The Davidson Building was first owned by real estate firm Davidson & Davidson who used the first floor of the building as its own office space. The firm also leased the building to the recently formed Federal Trade Commission, as, at the time, federal-owned office buildings were scarce and government agencies resorted to renting spaces within private buildings. The agreement between the firm and the agency would be short-lived as the U.S. government would eventually construct more purpose-built federal buildings for its agencies. The Davidson Building would be purchased by real estate developer William S. Phillips in 1923 and renamed the Phillips Building. The building would then be purchased by Albert Carry Properties in 1929 and be known as the Carry Building until 1965 when owner Joseph C. Carry died.

The building, while still commonly referred to as the Davidson Building, is currently designated as Three McPherson Square. The first floor offices have since been replaced by retail space, occupied by various shops and restaurants over time, while the offices at floors two through twelve remain occupied by various tenants.

=== Preservation ===
The Davidson Building is located within the Financial Historic District (Fifteenth Street Financial Historic District before 2016), which first was listed on the District of Columbia Inventory of Historic Sites (DCIHS) in 1984 and on the National Park Service's National Register of Historic Places (NRHP) in 2006 before being re-listed in 2016 and 2017 respectively after expanding. The building itself was added to the DCIHS on July 28, 2016 and on the NRHP later that year on October 4.
