= Denrike Building =

Historic building in Washington, D.C., US

- U.S. National Register of Historic Places
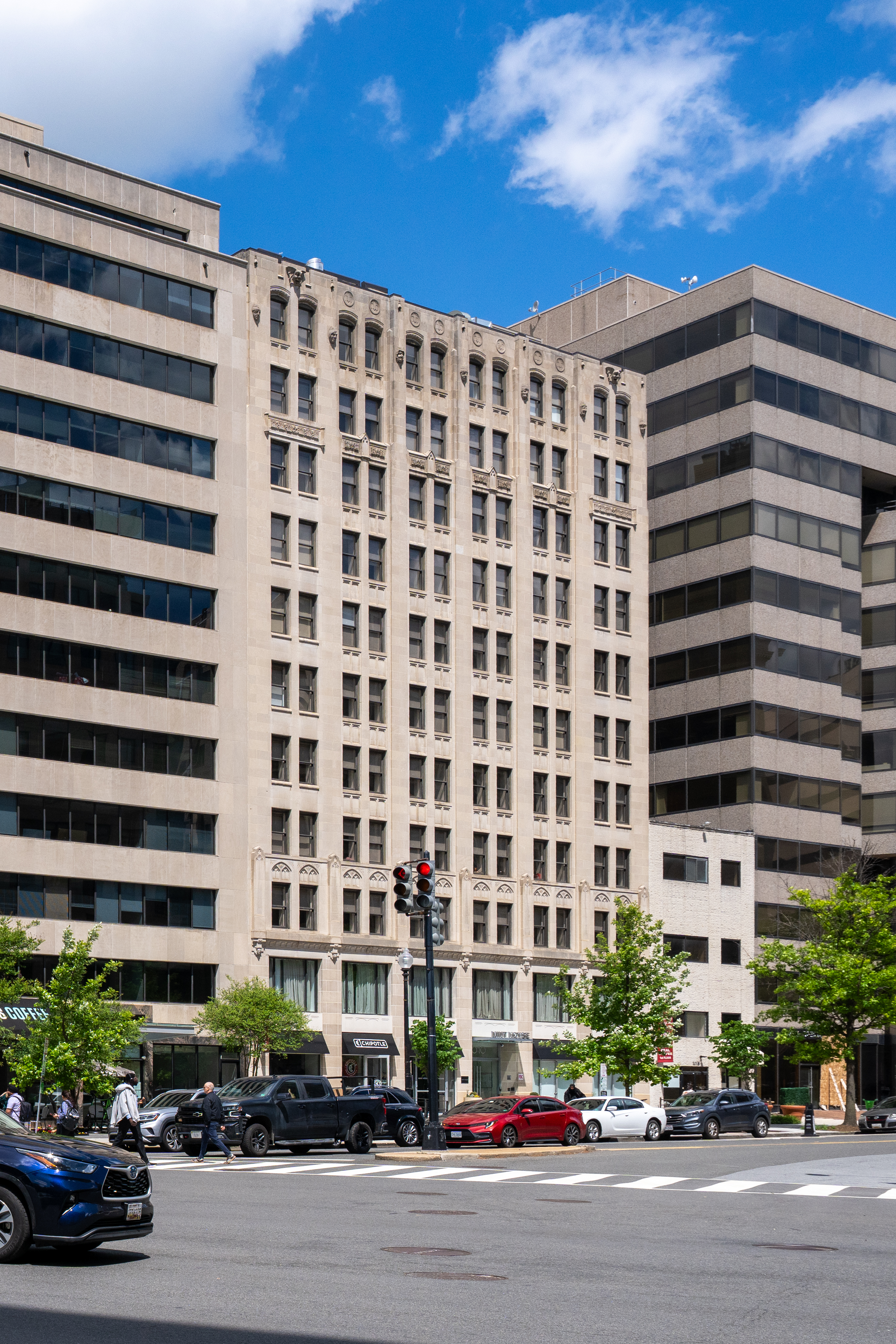
- The Denrike Building in 2026

- Location within Central Washington, D.C. Location within the District of Columbia Location within the United States
- Location: 1010 Vermont Avenue NW, Washington, DC, 20005
- Coordinates: 38°54′11″N 77°02′02″W
- Built: 1926
- Architectural style: Gothic Revival
- NRHP reference No.: 16000542
- Added to NRHP: June 30, 2016

The Denrike Building is a historic office building in Washington, D.C., United States at 1010 Vermont Avenue Northwest near McPherson Square. Built in 1926 as an office building, it has since had retail space added to its ground level floor and its offices are planned to converted into apartments. The building was added to the District of Columbia Inventory of Historic Sites on June 23, 2016 and the National Register of Historic Places on June 30 and is located within the city's Financial Historic District.

== Description ==
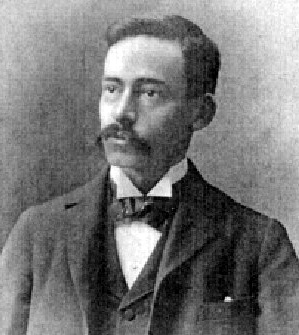
Appleton P. Clark Jr. (1865–1955)

The Denrike Building was designed by local architect Appleton P. Clark Jr. and is built with Gothic Revival-style architecture and features Tudor Gothic detailing throughout the building's limestone facade.

== History ==
=== Construction and latter renovations ===
Construction of the Denrike Building began in 1925 and was completed in 1926, replacing a Victorian era house that was built in 1884. This occurred during a period where, as Washington's financial district expanded northward, residential buildings at McPherson Square were replaced with office buildings.

Upon its completion, the building had 230 office suites. The offices at the ground level would eventually be replaced by shops with the building's original limestone facade at the level being replaced as well. Announced in 2022, the Denrike Building's offices are slated to be converted into 85 apartment units with completion in 2025.

=== Preservation ===
The Denrike Building is located within Washington's Financial Historic District. The building was added to the District of Columbia Inventory of Historic Sites on June 23, 2016 and the National Register of Historic Places a week later on June 30.
