= Southern Railway Building =

Historic office building in Washington, D.C., US

- U.S. National Register of Historic Places
- U.S. Historic district – Contributing property
- D.C. Inventory of Historic Sites
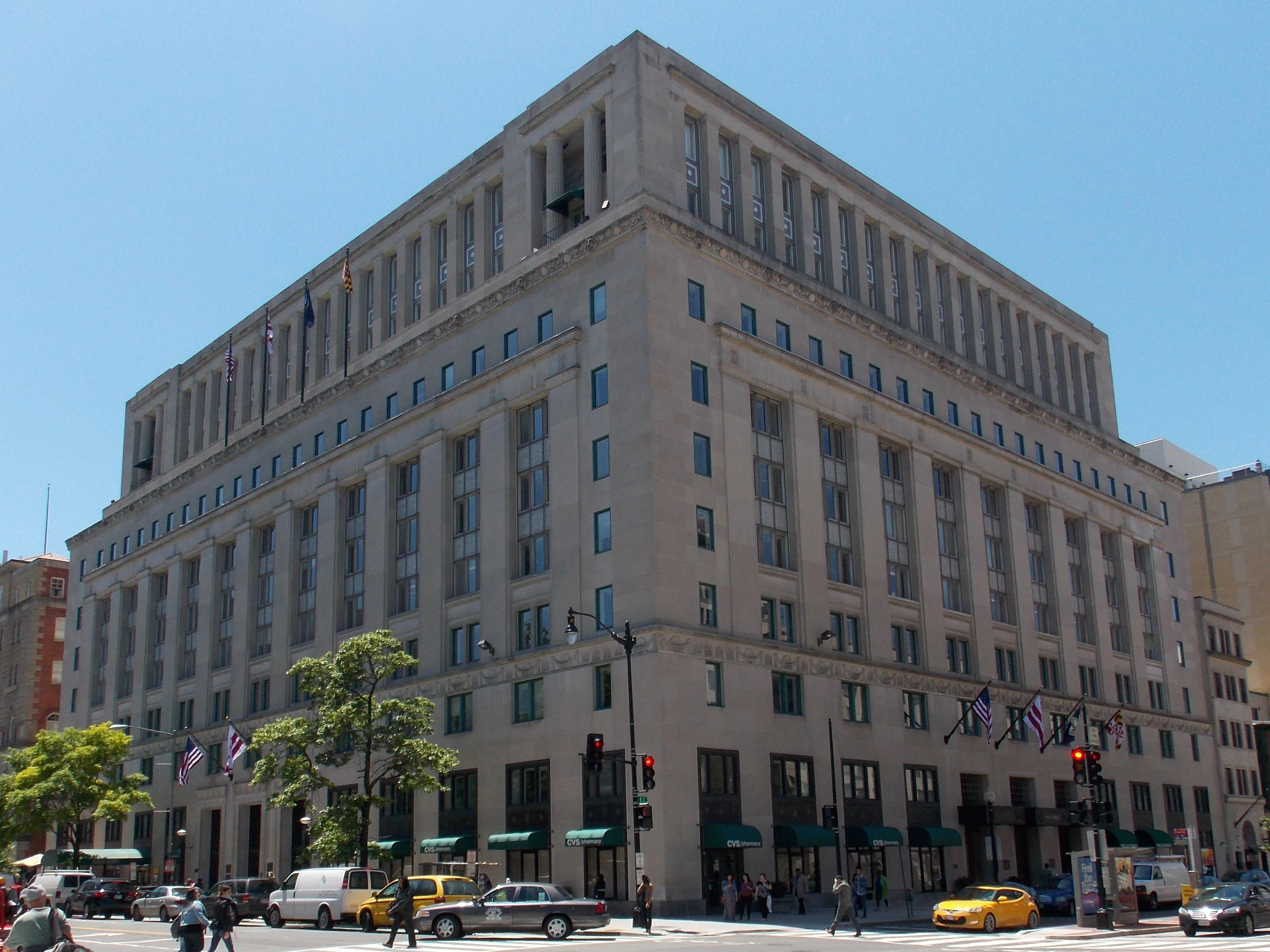
- Southern Railway Building in 2016
- Location: 1500 K Street, NW, Washington, D.C., US
- Coordinates: 38°54′08″N 77°02′06″W
- Area: 32,673 sq ft (3,035.4 m^{2})
- Built: 1928
- Architect: Waddy Butler Wood
- Architectural style: Stripped Classicism
- Part of: Financial Historic District (ID100000540 - boundary increase)
- NRHP reference No.: 16000194

Significant dates
- Added to NRHP: April 26, 2016
- Designated CP: January 12, 2017
- Designated DCIHS: February 25, 2016

The Southern Railway Building is a historic office building located in Washington, D.C., United States. It was built in 1928–1929 by local architect Waddy Butler Wood as the executive headquarters for the Southern Railway. The eleven-story building was designed in the Stripped Classical style with early Art Deco elements, and was constructed with a frame of steel and concrete fronted with limestone and set on a granite base. The site functioned as the railway's headquarters until 1982, when the company merged with the Norfolk and Western Railway. The newly-formed Norfolk Southern Railway moved its headquarters to Norfolk, Virginia, and the Southern Railway Building became privately owned with multiple tenants. It was listed on the National Register of Historic Places and District of Columbia Inventory of Historic Sites in 2016. It is also a contributing property to the Financial Historic District.

== Architecture ==
The Southern Railway Building was constructed with a frame of steel and concrete and faced with limestone, resting on a low granite foundation. The building was designed in a pared down version of Classical Revival, and is separated vertically into a column of three parts: a primary massing of eight stories consisting of a three-story base and five-story shaft, topped by a temple-like setback capital of three stories. The building stands 130 feet (40 m) tall, and its primary 13-bay façade stretches 217 feet (66 m) on 15th Street facing McPherson Square. That elevation includes a three-bay recessed entrance of double bronze doors surrounded by a bronze frame and grills and the words "SOUTHERN RAILWAY" in stylized capital letters.

The primary feature of the building's shaft are pilasters of the giant order that span the structure's four middle floors. Above those, the punched windows of the eighth floor act as a cornice before the three-floor setback. That section, which extends the building's height to the city's 130-foot (40 m) maximum, is separated in its appearance from the rest of the building and includes Doric pilasters flanked by pairs of columns. The overall effect is one of a temple sitting on a base. The building's 11-bay north elevation is similar to that of the east, though there are no pairs of columns on either side of the setback. A 1995 renovation to the building saw three central entrances cut into the ground floor on the north façade; while the doors themselves are modern, the bronze frames and spandrels from the previously existing windows were retained.

Professional offices occupy the majority of the building's floors. Street-front entrances provide access to retail space on the ground floor, and the offices are reached via an elevator bank located inside a two-story, marble-lined lobby. A penthouse contains the former offices of the president of the Southern Railway, which as of 2009 included its original fireplace and mantel.

== History ==
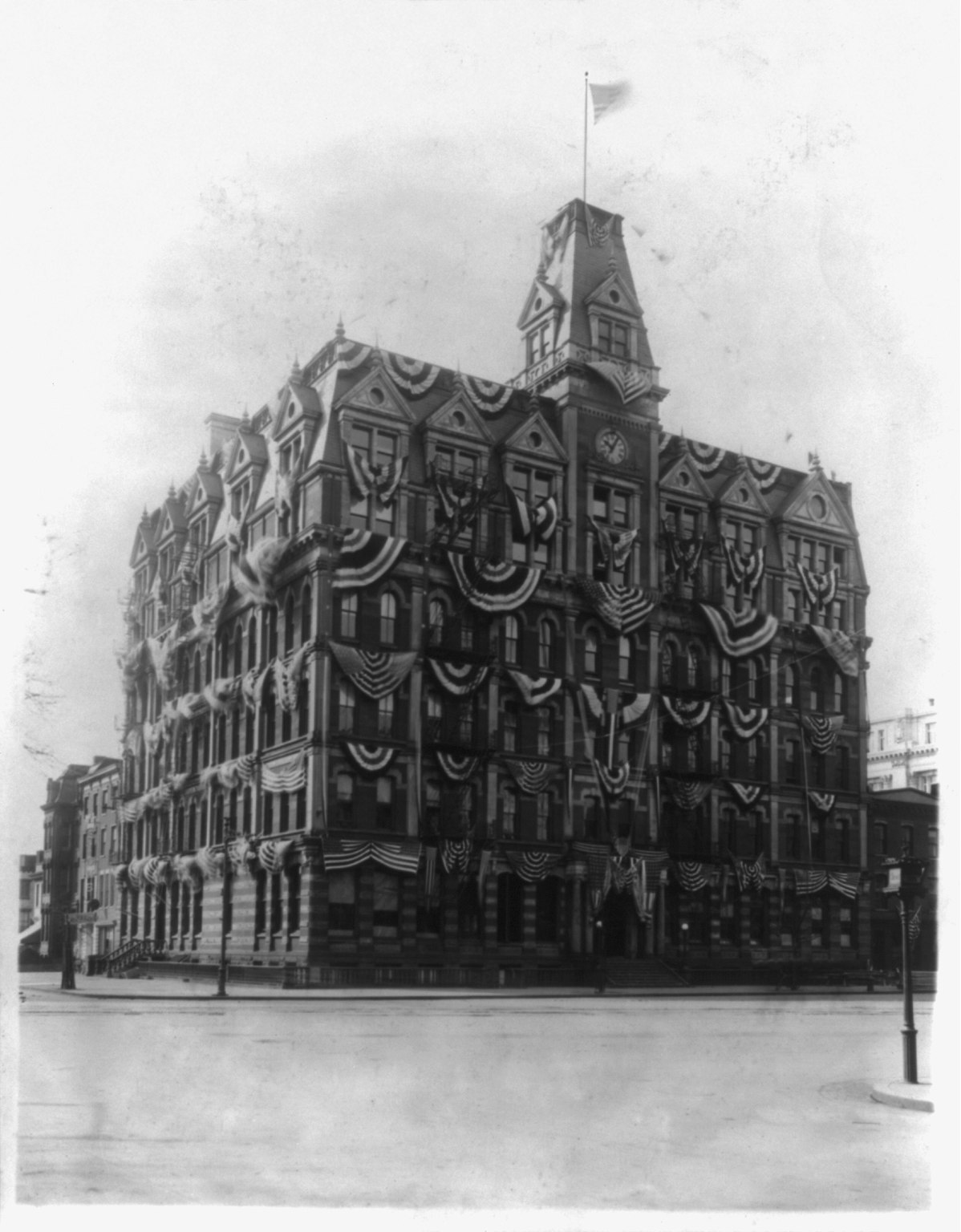
The 1871 Southern Railway building

The Southern Railway was created in 1894 when railroad financiers J.P. Morgan & Co. oversaw the reorganization of two struggling lines, the Richmond & Danville and the East Tennessee, Virginia, and Georgia. The new company retained the Washington, D.C. headquarters building of the Richmond & Danville, located at the intersection of 13th Street and Pennsylvania Avenue. That building, built in 1871 in the Second Empire style, was destroyed by a fire in 1916, and the company built a new structure on the same site.

In 1926, the federal government passed the Public Buildings Act, authorizing the funds necessary to purchase properties along Pennsylvania Avenue for the purpose of constructing government offices. It was later recommended that the 1916 Southern Railway Building – which one U.S. congressman called "about the worst looking building on the Avenue" – be included in the project. Southern Railway, which at the time employed 2,200 people in the building, considered moving their headquarters out of Washington should the sale occur. Local business leaders, including the heads of the chamber of commerce and merchants association, lobbied the company to remain in the city. Despite the government's acquisition of the property in 1928, Southern Railway decided to purchase an 11-parcel site at 15th and K Streets for over $1.6 million. While its executive offices remained in D.C., Southern Railway did move its accounting department to Atlanta, Georgia, which resulted in less than half of its previous Washington-based workforce staying in the city.

The company succeeded in having the building height limit at their new site raised from 90 feet (27 m) to 110 feet (34 m). A setback on top of the building – permitted by the city's zoning laws – brought its eventual height to 130 feet (40 m). Southern Railway hired the D.C.-area architect Waddy Butler Wood to design the new structure, which he stated would be inspired by the Acropolis of Athens. The building's cornerstone laying ceremony in December 1928 was conducted by local Freemasons, and the trowel and gavel used were the same as those used by George Washington, who was himself a Master Mason, when he laid the cornerstone of the U.S. Capitol.

As part of the building's construction, decorative elements including a fireplace mantel and wall paneling were removed from the William Aiken House in Charleston, South Carolina and installed in the top floor executive offices of the Southern Railway Building. The company had come into possession of the house in 1899 when it acquired the South Carolina Canal and Railroad Company – of which William Aiken Sr. had been the first president – and used it as its base of operations in Charleston. When Southern Railway donated the Aiken House to the National Trust for Historic Preservation in 1978, the presentation was held in the D.C. building's executive offices. Southern Railway president L. Stanley Crane remarked that it was "particularly appropriate that the presentation be made in this room, which was once part of the Aiken House."

The building served as the executive headquarters for the Southern Railway until 1982, when the company merged with the Roanoke, Virginia-based Norfolk and Western Railway. The newly-formed Norfolk Southern Railway moved its headquarters to Norfolk, Virginia and moved out of the Washington, D.C. offices. In 1987, Norfolk Southern paired with a real estate developer to remodel the Southern Railway Building's interior and restore its exterior. The two-year, $50 million renovation added over 20,000 square feet (1,900 m^{2}) of office space to the facility. The lobby and executive offices on the top floor remained largely untouched. A second renovation occurred in 1995. The building was listed on the National Register of Historic Places and District of Columbia Inventory of Historic Sites in 2016. It was designated a contributing property to the Financial Historic District the following year, and as of 2022, the building was owned by the Grosvenor Group and housed ground-floor retail and upscale office space.

== See also ==
- National Register of Historic Places listings in Washington, D.C.
