= Jean-Guillaume, baron Hyde de Neuville =

French noble and politician (1776–1858)

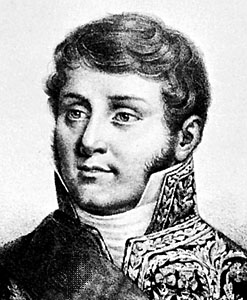
An illustration of Jean-Guillaume, baron Hyde de Neuville

Jean-Guillaume, baron Hyde de Neuville (24 January 1776 – 28 May 1857) was a French nobleman, diplomat, medical doctor and politician who served as the French ambassador to the United States from 1815 to 1821.

== Early life ==
Jean-Guillaume Hyde was born in La Charité-sur-Loire, Nièvre on 24 January 1776. He was the son of Guillaume Hyde, a Frenchman of English descent whose Jacobite ancestors fled from Great Britain to France with Charles Edward Stuart after the failure of the rising of 1745. Growing up, he studied at the Collège du Cardinal Lemoine in Paris before becoming involved in politics at the young age of 16. In 1793, after the outbreak of the French Revolution, Hyde successfully defended a man denounced by Joseph Fouché before the Revolutionary Tribunal of Nevers. From that year onwards, he worked as a secret agent of the French royal family, taking part in a failed 1796 royalist uprising against the Republican regime in Berry. After the Coup of 18 Brumaire on 9 November 1799, using the pseudonym "Paul Xavier", he unsuccessfully attempted to persuade Napoleon to allow the House of Bourbon to return to France.

== Exile and return ==
During the periods of the French Consulate and the First French Empire, he practised medicine in Lyon using the pseudonym "Roland", and was awarded a gold medal by the authorities for promoting vaccination efforts among the general public. After a failed assassination attempt against Napoleon, known as the plot of the rue Saint-Nicaise, occurred on 24 December 1800, Hyde was briefly accused of being involved with the plotters before the accusation was withdrawn. In 1806, Napoleon offered him monetary compensation for his estates which were confiscated during the French Revolution on the condition that he emigrate to the United States. Accepting the offer, Hyde settled down near New Brunswick, New Jersey, and his residence subsequently became a meeting point for French royalist exiles in the U.S. In 1813, he helped his friend Jean Victor Marie Moreau accept an offer to serve in the Imperial Russian Army in the ongoing Napoleonic Wars. After the War of the Sixth Coalition ended with a Bourbon Restoration in France in 1814, Hyde returned to his country of birth from the United States.

== Diplomatic career ==
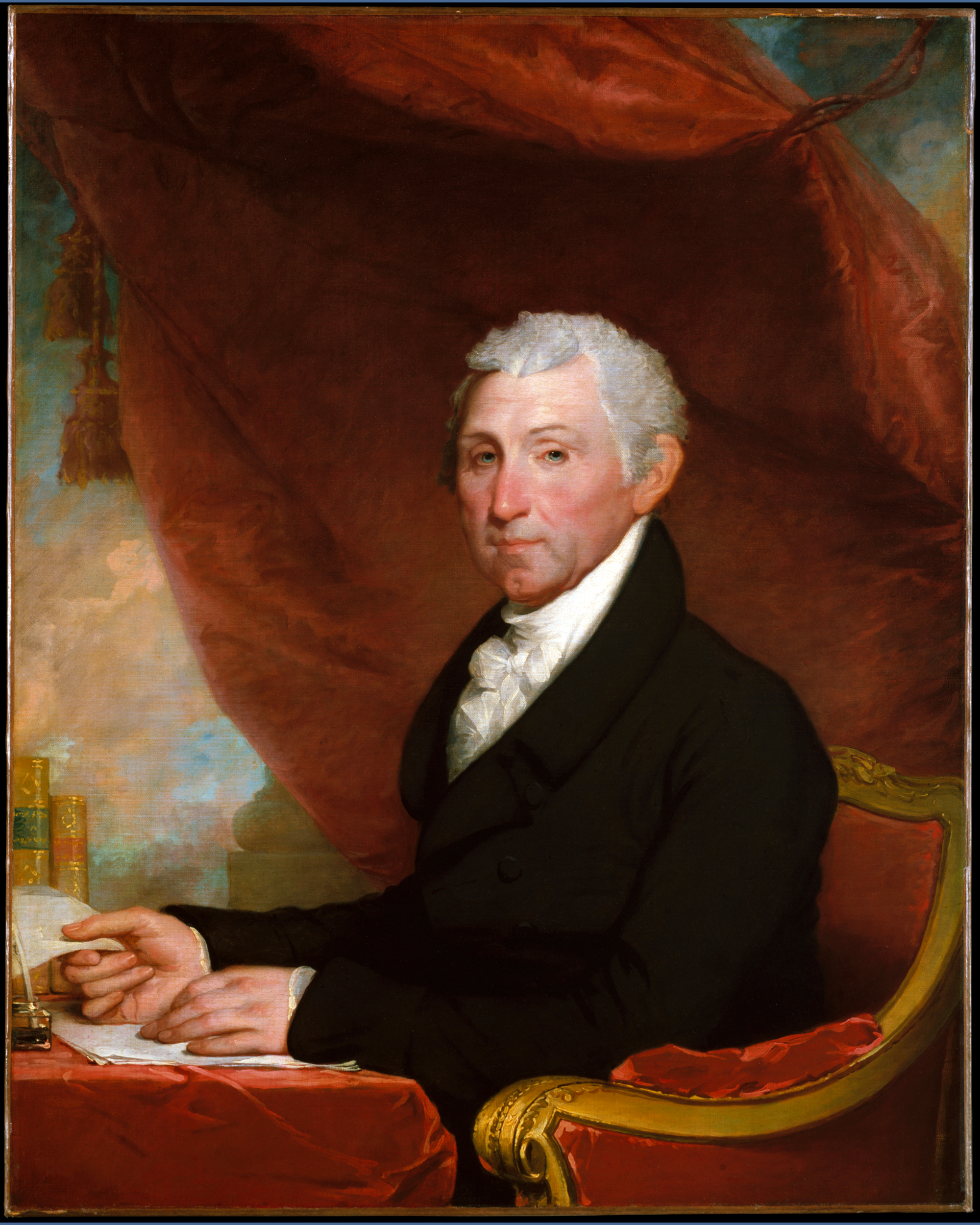
James Monroe, with whom Hyde had a hostile relationship while serving as ambassador

After arriving in France, Hyde was appointed as a diplomat by the newly restored King Louis XVIII and sent to London in order to persuade the Liverpool ministry to transfer the defeated Napoleon to a remoter place of exile than Elba, where he had been sent to. However, his negotiations with the British were cut short by Napoleon's return from Elba to France on March 15. After Napoleon was defeated at Waterloo, he was exiled to Saint Helena instead. In January 1816, Hyde was appointed to serve as the French ambassador to the United States, moving to Washington, D.C. where he negotiated a commercial treaty with the U.S. government as his first action in office. Hyde grew to have a hostile relationship with U.S. President James Monroe, who "despised" him, with Monroe referring to Hyde on one occasion as "disagreeable and ill tempered" and on another as "overly delicate" and "obscene".

Hyde's diplomatic career was also punctuated with other such mishaps, including offending Virginia senator James Barbour when he invited Barbour to dinner and proceeded to arrive drunk and several hours late. He also offended Ann Preston, wife of Governor James Patton Preston, when he allowed a door to slam into her face when Ann had expected Hyde to hold it open. On another occasion, while dining with South Carolina senators William Smith and John Gaillard in January 1817, Hyde grew verbally abusive and loudly belched after consuming large amounts of alcohol. After the dinner, both Smith and Gaillard refused to acknowledge Hyde ever again.

In 1820, Secretary of State John Quincy Adams suggested he be sent back to France, and in the following December, Hyde was relinquished of his posting after almost coming to blows with British ambassador to the United States Stratford Canning over a long-simmering dispute stemming from political and personal differences. After Hyde returned to France, he declined an offer to serve as the French ambassador to the Ottoman Empire, and in November 1822 was elected to the Chamber of Deputies, representing the constituency of Cosne. Louis XVIII created a barony for him in the French peerage and awarded him a Legion of Honour in 1821 as reward for his services and loyalty. In 1823, he was appointed as French ambassador to Portugal, where he helped release King John VI from imprisonment imposed by his son Miguel and was rewarded with the Portuguese peerage of Comte de Bemposta.

While in Portugal, his efforts to supplant British diplomatic influence there culminated (in connection with the April Revolt led by Miguel on 30 April 1824) in his suggestion to the Portuguese government that a request to be sent to Britain for a military intervention. Hyde planned for the Liverpool ministry to refuse this due to the British having proclaimed a principle of non-interventionism in European affairs, which would allow France to then be in a position to undertake an intervention that Britain had declined. However, Hyde's plans came to naught when reactionary politicians in Paris, who disapproved of the Portuguese Constitution of 1822, refused to support a French intervention in Portugal. This led to a collapse of Hyde's political influence in Portugal, and he soon returned to Paris and resumed serving in the Chamber of Deputies.

== Later life and death ==
Though he had earlier been a fervent royalist, Hyde now gradually became a supporter of liberalism, opposing the conservative policies of the ministry of Joseph de Villèle. In 1828, he began serving as Minister of the Navy and the Colonies in the relatively liberal ministry of Jean-Baptiste de Martignac. While in office, he supported the Greek War of Independence, worked to improve the governance of the French colonial empire and implemented the abolition of France's involvement in the Atlantic slave trade. He was elected a member of the American Philosophical Society in 1829. During the ministry of Jules de Polignac from 1829 to 1830, he again became an opposition politician, advocating for continued observance of the Charter of 1814. However, after the 1830 July Revolution, he resigned from his position in the Chamber of Deputies in protest against the exclusion of the legitimate Bourbon family line from the French throne.

During the reign of King Louis Philippe I, Hyde settled down to a quiet life on his estate near Sancerre with his wife Anne Marguerite Hyde de Neuville. In 1837, he took part in the discussion over the possibility of the French government signing a new commercial treaty with the United States, writing and publishing several pamphlets, including one titled Observations on the commerce of France with the United States, on the issue. On 28 May 1857, he died in Paris. His memoirs, titled Memoirs and souvenirs, were compiled from his notes by his nieces and published in 1888 in three volumes.
