= Rhodes' Tavern =

Historic tavern in Washington, D.C.

- U.S. National Register of Historic Places
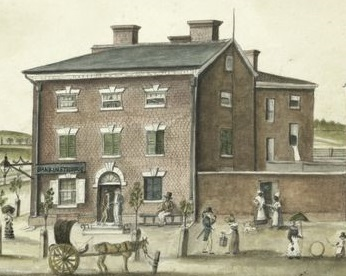
- Rhodes tavern, 1817 by Anne Marguerite Hyde de Neuville

- Location within Central Washington, D.C.
- Location: 15th Street and F Street, N.W. Washington, D.C., U.S.
- Coordinates: 38°53′51.2″N 77°1′59.95″W
- Built: 1799
- Architectural style: Early Republic, Federal
- NRHP reference No.: 69000301
- Added to NRHP: March 24, 1969

Rhodes Tavern is the site of a historic tavern in the early history of Washington, D.C. It was located at 15th Street and F Street, Northwest, Washington, D.C.

== History ==
It was built in 1799 by Bennett Fenwick on land he had purchased in 1797. It was sold or rented to William Rhodes in 1801 and he operated it as a tavern and inn until 1805. During that time it was a polling place in the first city council election on June 7, 1802. In 1805, Rhodes sold it to Joseph Semmes, Rhodes future brother-in-law who had run the successful City Tavern in Georgetown. Semmes renamed it the Indian King and ran it until 1809, when he sold it to Virginia Congressman John George Jackson. From 1810 to June 1814, Jackson lived here and Mrs. Barbara Suter ran it as a boarding house for him. Several members of Congress stayed here during that time including John Sevier the first governor of Tennessee. Jackson sold it, and it became the Bank of Metropolis, and later Riggs Bank. Contrary to popular belief, British soldiers did not dine or stay here as they burned the city in August 1814. That occurred at Mrs. Suter's new place on Pennsylvania and 15th. An image of how the building looked in 1817 was painted by Anne Marguerite Hyde de Neuville in 1817.

It was the first home of Riggs Bank, from 1837 to 1845. It was here, in 1881, that Charles Guiteau would buy the gun with which he would later shoot and kill President James Garfield. It was the home of the National Press Club from 1909 to 1914, and was visited by Theodore Roosevelt, William Howard Taft, and Woodrow Wilson.

== Demolition controversy ==
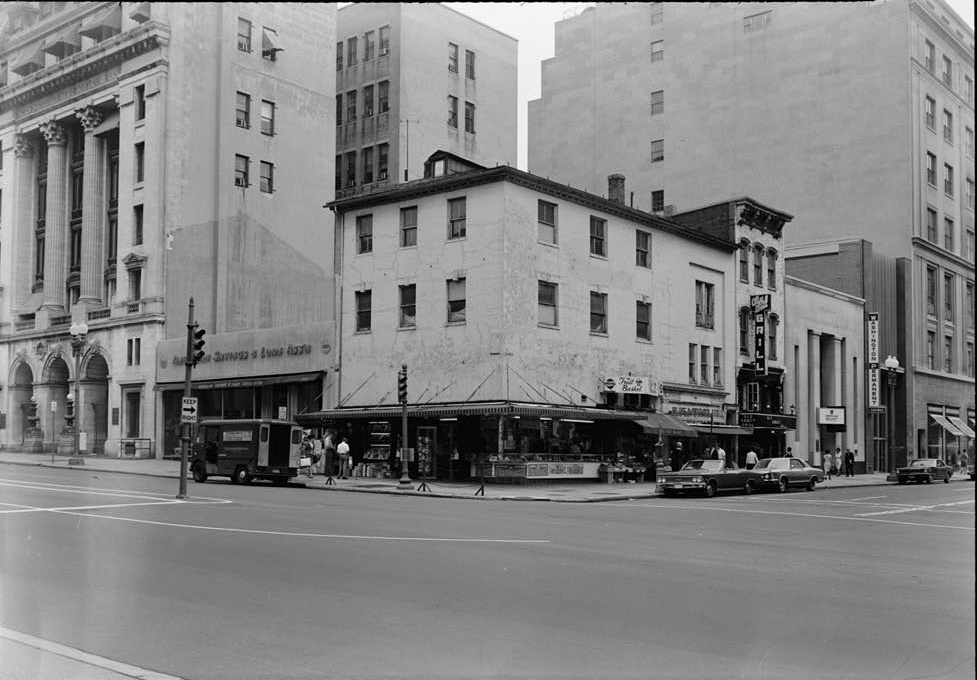
Corner View, Summer, 1967, by Dan Reiff

The building was listed on the U.S. National Register of Historic Places on March 24, 1969. In March 1978, the United States Commission of Fine Arts recommended demolition, while finding the Keith-Albee Theater and National Metropolitan Bank facades historic. J. Carter Brown referred to Rhodes Tavern as: "the missing tooth in the smile of 15th Street."

In 1979, the D.C. Superior Court halted demolition of the Keith Albee building, but then allowed demolition of the interior. The developer said he would preserve the historic facade of the Keith-Albee theater building, if he could demolish Rhodes Tavern. In 1981, the Supreme Court declined to review the District of Columbia Court of Appeals allowing demolition.

The White House curator, Clement Conger, advocated restoration of the tavern, like Fraunces Tavern, and Gadsby's Tavern Museum. In 1982, a House Subcommittee held hearings about the demolition. A ballot initiative to preserve the building was approved by Washington citizens in 1983.

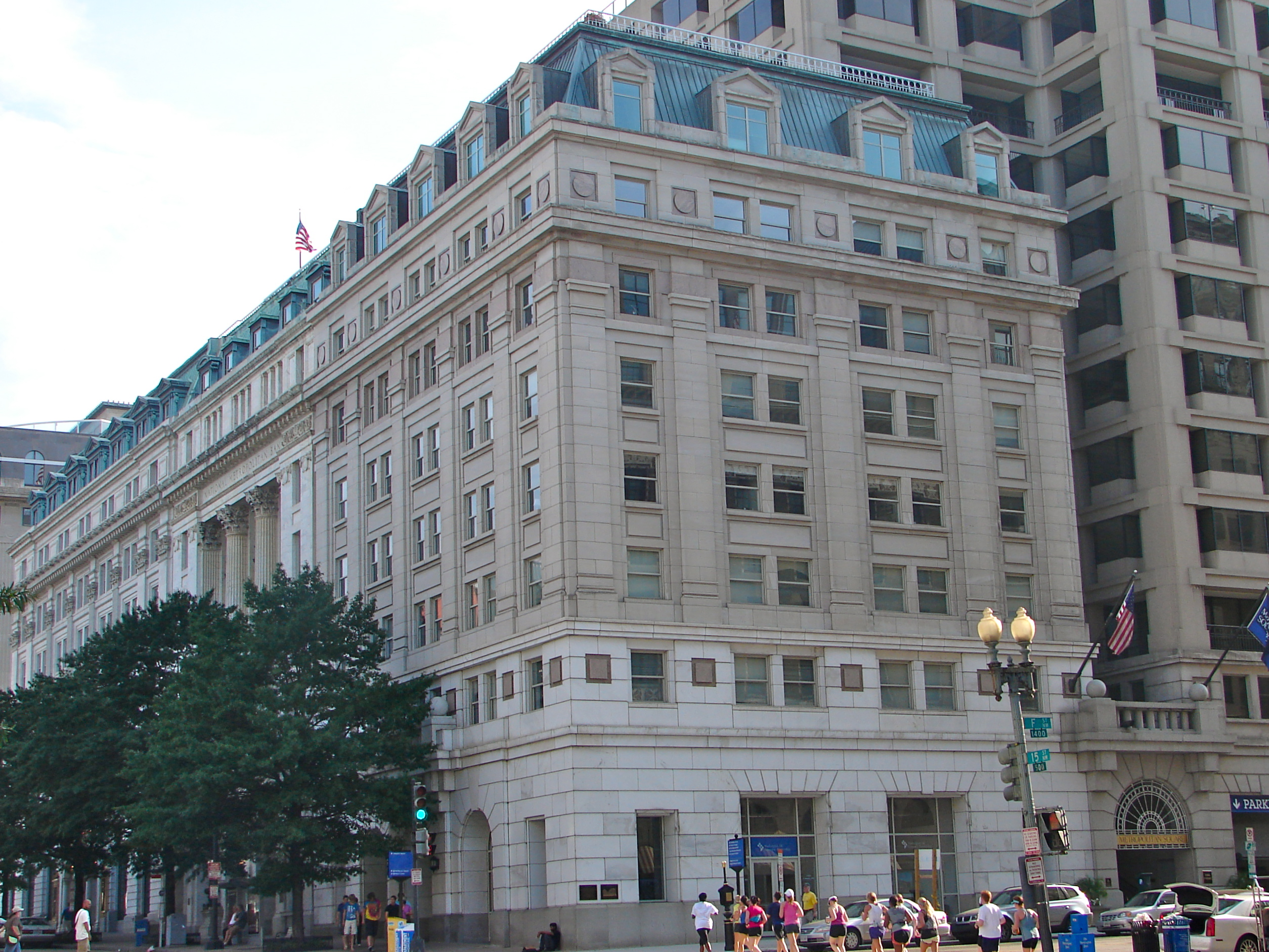
Metropolitan Square phase II

City attorneys argued that the ballot initiative did not bar demolition. Mayor Marion Barry named seven people to a review board in accordance with the initiative.

In June 1984, the D.C. Superior Court granted a preliminary injunction against a demolition permit. In August, the D.C. Superior Court found the initiative to halt demolition unconstitutional. The D.C. Court of Appeals blocked demolition, but required a $100,000 bond. Warren Burger, of the Supreme Court declined to stay the order by the District of Columbia Superior Court to allow demolition. After the D.C. Court of Appeals lifted the injunction, demolition began at 1:57, September 10, 1984. Wrecking Corporation of America demolished through the night to avoid further Court review. People collected nails and bricks from the demolition.

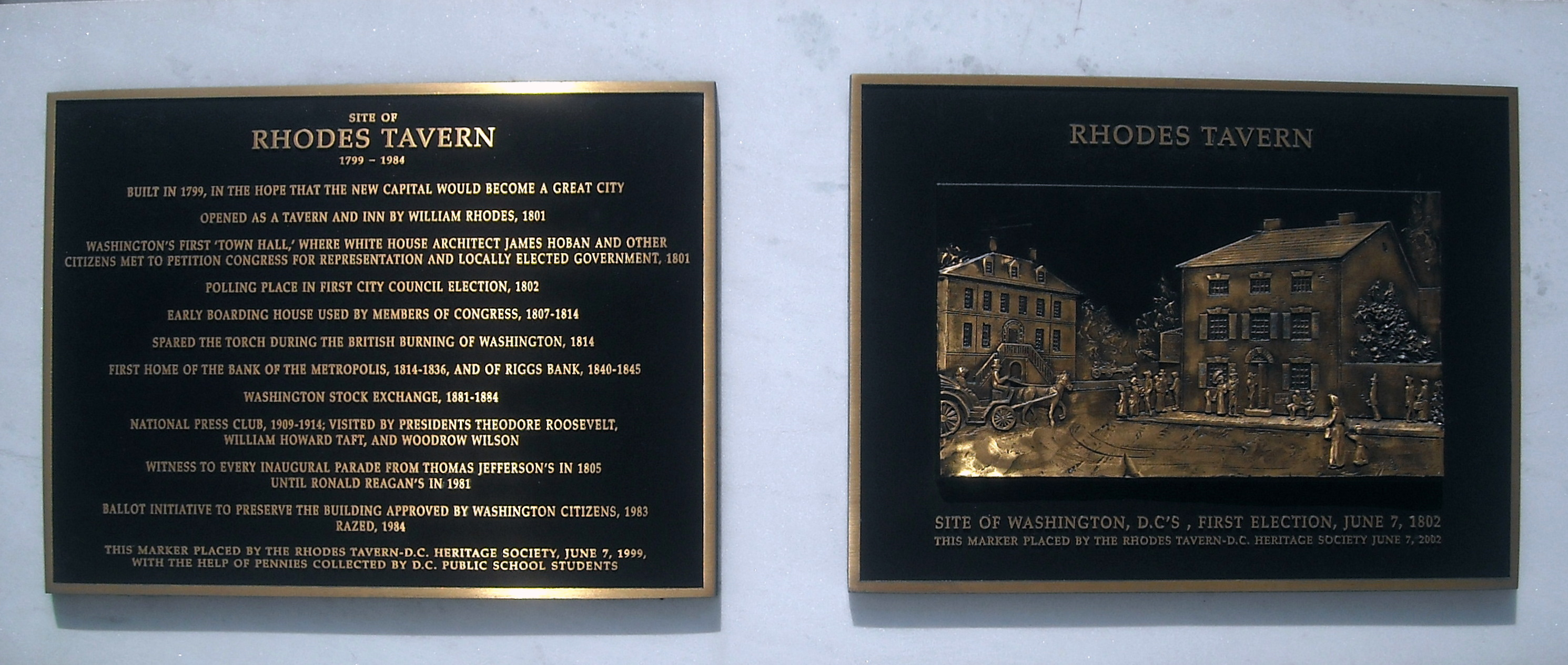
Rhodes Tavern plaque

The lot is now the site of Metropolitan Square office building, phase II, completed in 1986.

The United States Commission of Fine Arts recommended placing a marker on the site. A marker was placed by the Rhodes Tavern – D.C. Heritage Society, on June 7, 1999.

== Legacy ==
The preservation battle was an impetus for the use of preservation law, by the Historic Preservation Office, for redevelopment in the District of Columbia. The papers of the Committee to Save Historic Rhodes Tavern are held at George Washington University.

A musical group The Rhodes Tavern Troubadours won a 2001 Wammie.

== See also ==
- National Register of Historic Places listings in the District of Columbia
