= Wormley's Hotel =

Five-story building in Washington, D.C.

Coordinates: 38.900°N 77.034°W

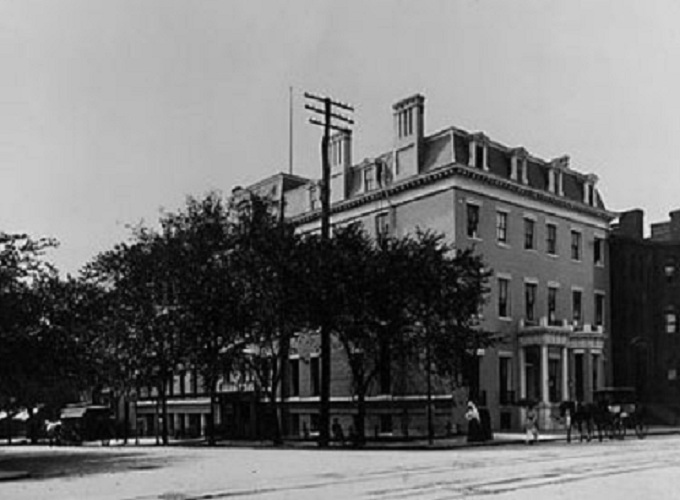
- Interactive map of the Wormley's Hotel area

General information
- Location: 1500 H Street, NW, Washington, D.C.
- Opened: 1871
- Demolished: c. 1906

Technical details
- Floor count: 5

Wormley's Hotel was a five-story hotel at 1500 H Street, NW, in Washington, D.C. It was opened in 1871 by James Wormley, a free-born black man who had spent time in Europe learning fine culinary skills. The hotel became a hub for local and foreign government officials. According to historian Vann Woodward, the hotel was the site of the Wormley Agreement, which led to the Compromise of 1877 and the election of President Rutherford B. Hayes. James Wormley died in 1884 and his son took over the business until he sold it in 1893. The hotel was later demolished and the Union Trust Company built on its site in 1906.

== Sources ==
- Sandra Fitzpatrick and Maria R. Goodwin, The Guide to Black Washington, rev. ed. (New York: Hippocrene Books, 1999), 193–194.
