= W. B. Hibbs and Company Building =

- U.S. National Register of Historic Places
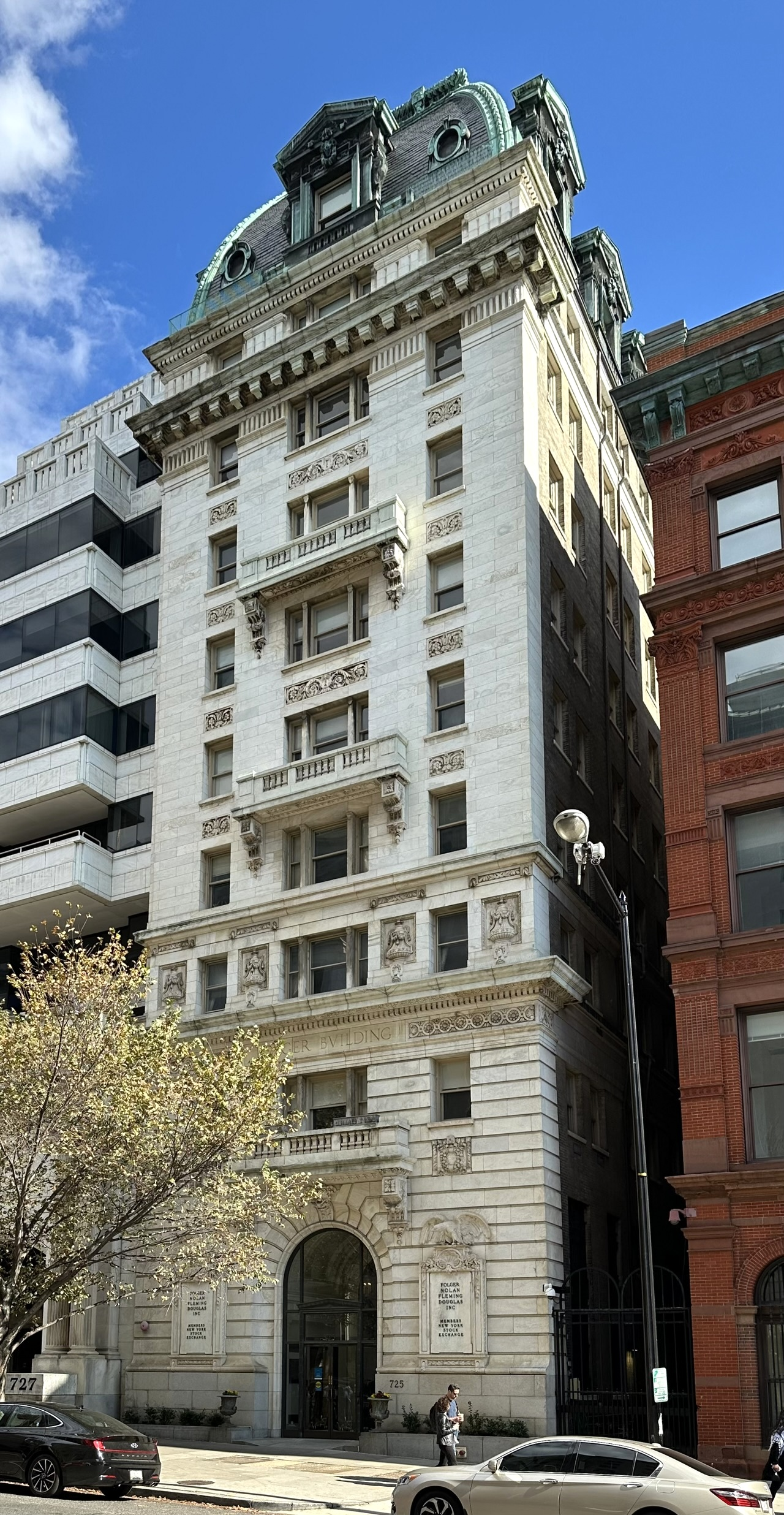
- W. B. Hibbs and Company Building in 2023

- Location within Washington, D.C.
- Location: 725 15th Street, NW; Washington, D.C.
- Coordinates: 38°53′58.2″N 77°2′0″W
- Built: 1906
- Architect: Jules Henri de Sibour
- Architectural style: Beaux Arts
- NRHP reference No.: 90002150
- Added to NRHP: March 19, 1991

The W. B. Hibbs and Company Building, also known as the Folger Building, is an historic structure located at 725 15th Street, Northwest, Washington, D.C., in Downtown Washington, D.C.

== History ==
Jules Henri de Sibour designed the building, which was completed in 1906.

It was listed on the District of Columbia Inventory of Historic Sites, on November 8, 1964. It was listed on the National Register of Historic Places in 1991.
