= Lafayette Building (Washington, D.C.) =

- U.S. National Register of Historic Places
- U.S. National Historic Landmark
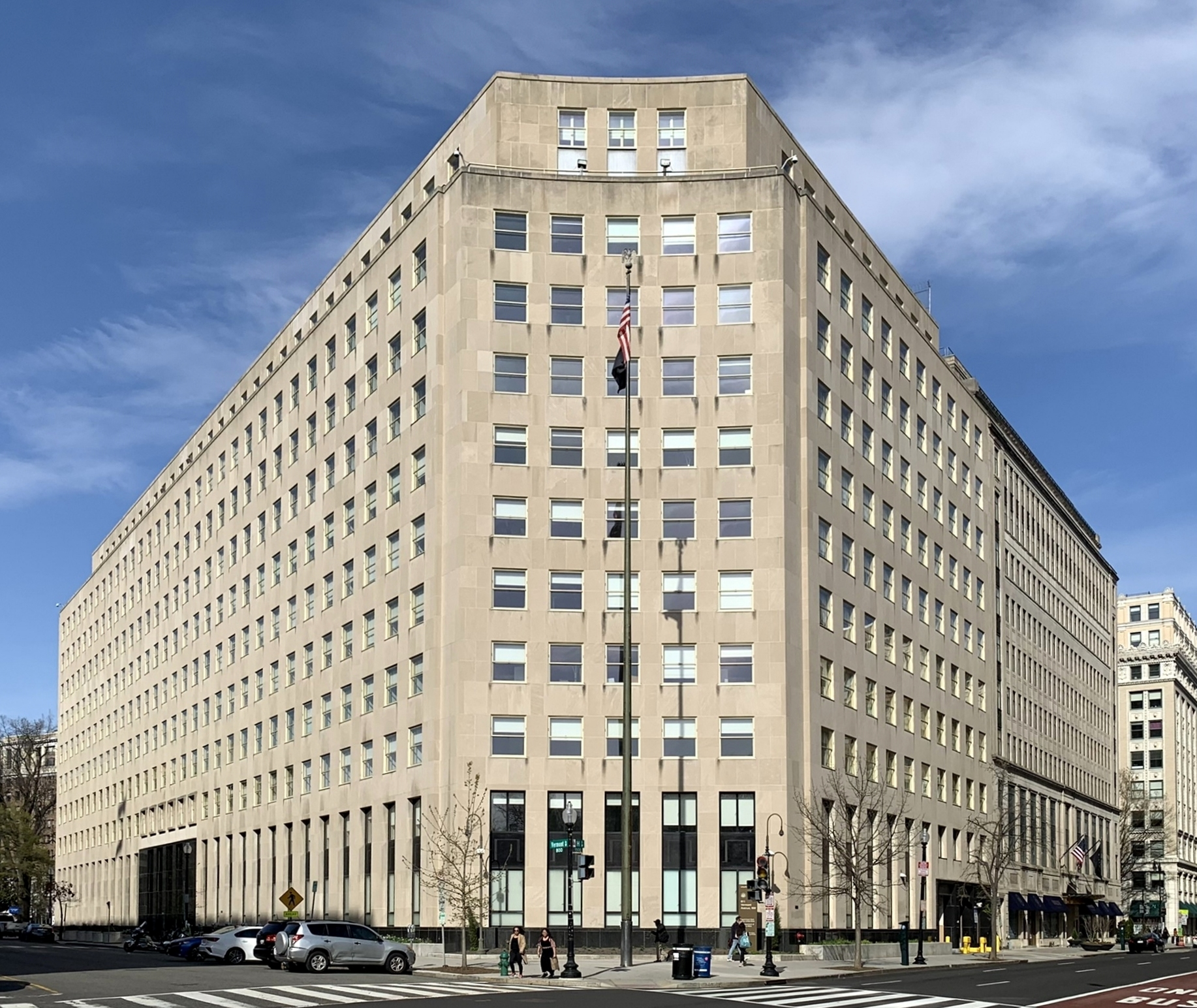
- Lafayette Building in 2022

- Location within Central Washington, D.C. Location within the District of Columbia Location within the United States
- Location: 811 Vermont Ave. NW; Washington, D.C.
- Coordinates: 38°54′2.8″N 77°02′4.0″W
- NRHP reference No.: 05001205

Significant dates
- Added to NRHP: September 1, 2005
- Designated NHL: September 1, 2005

The Lafayette Building, also known as Export-Import Bank Building, is a federal government office building at 811 Vermont Avenue NW in Washington, D.C. Completed in 1940, it was declared a National Historic Landmark in 2005. Its landmark designation was made because it was home to the Reconstruction Finance Corporation, the government arm that financed and oversaw the mobilization of the United States economy during World War II. It is currently home to the Export–Import Bank of the United States and to offices of the United States Department of Veterans Affairs.

== Building history ==
In 1938, the Lafayette Building Corporation was established with the purpose of constructing a building at Lafayette and Fifteenth streets in Washington, D.C. The corporation intended to privately develop the building that would then be leased to the federal government, making this an unusual speculative venture. The group retained the Chicago architectural firm Holabird & Root to design the building, which included some of the first uses of underground parking and central air-conditioning in the city. Holabird & Root invited a former employee, Washington architect A.R. Clas, to participate in key components of the design. Clas, who also worked for the federal government before starting his own firm, was likely critical in securing the commission. The architects selected the Stripped Classical style for the design of the Lafayette Building. The cornerstone was laid in 1939 and construction was completed a year later. Architectural Forum praised the design as a good example of "an observance of the classic formula with the elimination of accompanying detail."

While commercial enterprises occupied the street-level retail spaces, finance-related agencies leased the remaining portions of the building. Original tenants included the Federal Loan Agency, Reconstruction Finance Corporation (RFC), RFC Mortgage Company, Disaster Loan Agency, Federal National Mortgage Authority, Export-Import Bank of Washington, and the Elective Home and Farm Authority, all established during the New Deal era. The building is significant for its historical association with both the Federal Loan Agency and the RFC, which were critical agencies involved in financing the mobilization of American industries during World War II. Jesse Holman Jones, who served as the chairman of the RFC until 1939 when he was appointed Federal Loan Administrator, maintained an office in the Lafayette Building, monitoring RFC activities even after he was appointed to the Cabinet as Secretary of Commerce in 1940, a position he retained until his retirement in 1945. Jones was called the second most important man in American government, after President Franklin Delano Roosevelt, and the building is significant for its association with Jones's prominent career.

In 1947, the federal government assumed ownership of the Lafayette Building. The building was designated a National Historic Landmark by the secretary of the interior in 2005.

== Architecture ==
Although developed by a private corporation, the restrained exterior appearance of the Lafayette Building is typical of federal buildings erected during the Great Depression and World War II years, when government officials and architects agreed that elaborate ornamentation on public buildings represented unnecessary costs. Stripped Classical buildings feature little ornamentation and blend classical forms and high-quality materials from earlier eras with Modern design tenets. The Lafayette Building retains a high level of architectural integrity on both the interior and exterior, appearing much as it did upon its completion in 1940.

The Lafayette Building is in a prominent location in Washington, D.C, facing both Lafayette Square and McPherson Square, one block from the White House. It occupies two-thirds of an irregularly shaped block bounded by Vermont Avenue and Fifteenth, I, and H streets and has an unusual footprint that is shaped like a lowercase E. The building is twelve stories in height, with the top two stories set back behind a terraced balcony. A granite retaining wall creates a narrow strip for plantings.

The Lafayette Building's steel frame is encased with concrete and brick, collectively selected by the architects for their fireproof qualities. The first story of the building, which contains retail space, is clad in black granite, while the upper levels are faced with smooth light grey limestone on the street-front elevations. Less costly brick faces the alley and courtyard elevations. Regularly spaced square windows with one-over-one, double-hung configurations dominate all elevations and are slightly recessed to avoid interruption of the wall plane. Bronze is used liberally on the first two stories, forming spandrels that divide the first and second levels, window frames, entrance doors, shop fronts, and select railings. Simple recessed panels at select ends of the building run the full height of the main mass and suggest plain classically inspired pilasters. A parapet wall with a deeply recessed mortar joint tops the tenth story and forms the terrace edge that contains the building's upper two stories.

The principal entrance consists of four pairs of deeply recessed bronze and glass doors centrally located on the Vermont Avenue elevation. Above the entry are tall bronze-framed windows with fixed lights, each surrounded by flush black granite panels and separated by three, two-story granite piers. Projecting limestone frames surround the third-story windows aligned above the entrance.

The architects designed the interior spaces to be reserved yet dramatic. The entrance lobby is both one and two stories in height and forms an irregular polygonal footprint with walls that splay outward. The space is defined by piers sheathed in black Alberene, a type of soapstone, and grey marble covers the walls. Recessed cove lighting illuminates the lobby. The first floor elevator lobbies are lit by a luminous rear wall. The elevator doors have a satin bronze finish with fluted horizontal bands.

Three important rooms directly associated with the Reconstruction Finance Corporation (RFC) are located on the eleventh and twelfth floors. These rooms convey a feeling of reserved richness, using high quality materials with spare decorative elements. The director's office suite, once occupied by Jesse Holman Jones, features knot pine paneling that is now painted. The modernization project of 2011 to 2016 stripped the paint off the Knotty Pine and restored the luster of highly polished and stained original knotty pine in Phase One of construction. The board room walls are covered in Appalachian oak paneling, while walnut paneling covers the conference room walls. Floors of all three rooms historically were covered in carpeting.

Other interior spaces employ high-quality materials. Simply elegant, they lack ornate decorative elements. Throughout the interior, walls are clad with polished white Alabama marble panels to a height of seven feet with plaster finishes above. Baseboards and door trim are black Alberene. Floors are covered with cream-colored terrazzo with inset panels and circles of black Alberene and grey terrazzo that mark important corridor junctions. Water fountains set in large, recessed, circular marble panels with Alberene frames are among the most prominent interior features.

== Significant events ==
- 1938 Lafayette Building Corporation established
- 1940 Lafayette Building construction completed
- 1940-1945 Jesse Holman Jones, Chairman of the Reconstruction Finance Corporation, occupies the director's suite
- 1947 Federal government assumes ownership of the building
- 2005 Building designated as a National Historic Landmark
- 2011 to 2016 Phase One and Phase Two of MAJOR renovation to entire building: All new power plant, new AC chiller system, rain harvest tank, green roof, solar panels, security upgrades, sidewalk scape - Achieving Leed Gold after completions 2017.

== Building facts ==
- Location: 811 Vermont Avenue, NW
- Architects: Holabird & Root, A.R. Clas
- Construction Dates: 1939-1940
- Architectural Style: Stripped Classical
- Landmark Status: National Historic Landmark
- Primary Materials: Limestone, Granite, and Brick
- Prominent Features: Restrained Facade; Early Use of Underground Parking and Central Air Conditioning
