= Federal-American National Bank =

- U.S. National Register of Historic Places
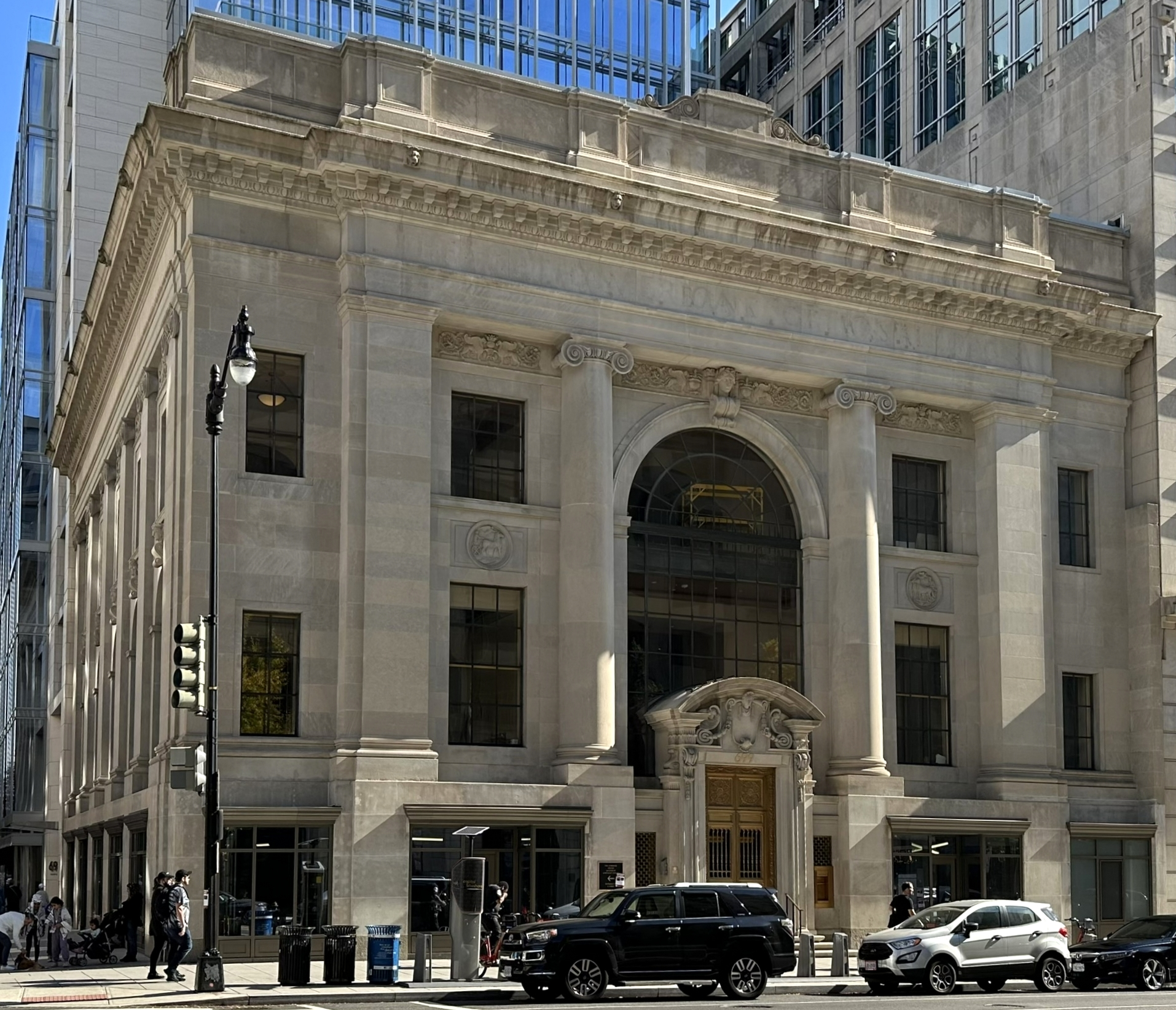
- Federal-American National Bank in 2023

- Location within Washington, D.C.
- Location: 615–621 14th Street NW, Washington, D.C. 20005
- Coordinates: 38°53′53.2″N 77°1′53.7″W
- Area: < 1 acre (0.40 ha)
- Built: 1925–1926
- Architect: Alfred C. Bossom; Jules Henri de Sibour
- Architectural style: Classical Revival
- MPS: Banks and Financial Institutions MPS
- NRHP reference No.: 94001517
- Added to NRHP: December 29, 1994

Federal-American National Bank is an historic structure located in Downtown Washington, D.C. It was listed on the National Register of Historic Places in 1994.

== History ==
The bank was formed as a merger between two other banks in 1923. Hamilton National Bank inhabited the building after the banking crisis of 1933. More recently it housed the National Bank of Washington.

== Architecture ==
Architects Alfred C. Bossom and Jules Henri de Sibour designed the building. The exterior of the structure is covered in limestone and features a Classical Revival facade, large arched windows, engaged columns and sculptural embellishment. The interior features a bronze vestibule and a Renaissance Revival banking room with a marble entrance stair, mezzanine, elaborate polychrome coffered ceiling, chandeliers, ornamentation in classical motifs, and innovative open counter design The building is somewhat unusual in that the main banking room is on a raised main floor and storefronts on the ground level.
