= United Mine Workers of America Building =

- U.S. National Register of Historic Places
- U.S. National Historic Landmark
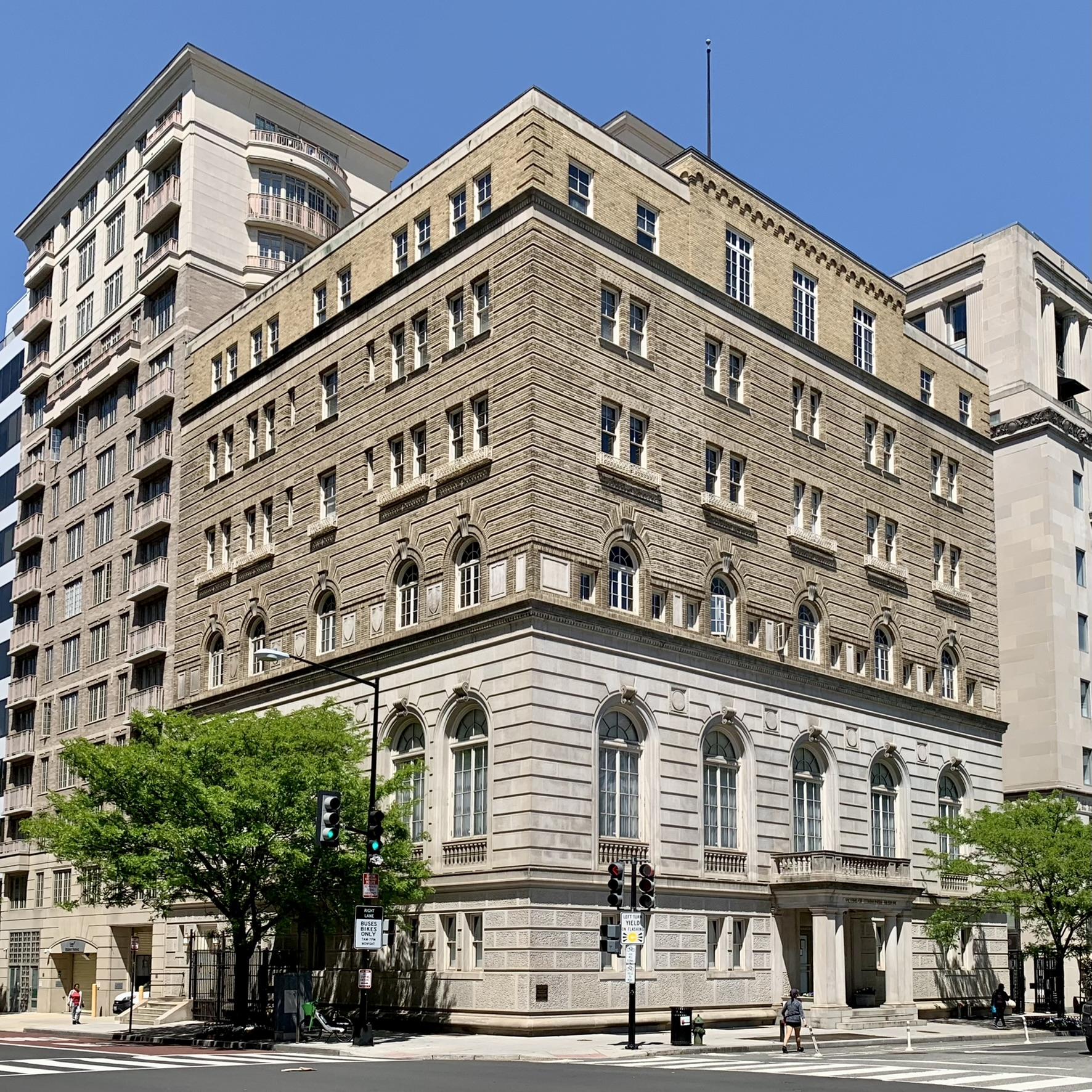
- United Mine Workers of America Building in 2022

- Location within Central Washington, D.C. Location within the District of Columbia Location within the United States
- Location: 900 Fifteenth St. NW, Washington, D.C.
- Coordinates: 38°54′6″N 77°2′5″W
- Built: 1912
- Architect: Totten, George Oakley; Porter, Irwin Stevens, et al.
- Architectural style: Renaissance Revival
- NRHP reference No.: 00001032

Significant dates
- Added to NRHP: September 13, 2000
- Designated NHL: April 5, 2005

The United Mine Workers of America Building is an historic building at 900 Fifteenth St. NW in the Downtown neighborhood of Washington, D.C. Built in 1912 as the home of the University Club, a private social club, it was the international headquarters of the United Mine Workers from 1936 to 1999. Under the leadership of John L. Lewis, the union played a major role in improving working conditions and pay for a large number of mine workers, with Lewis eventually founding the Congress of Industrial Organizations to improve conditions for other types of laborers. The building was designated a National Historic Landmark in 2005. The upper floors of the building have been converted to residences.

== Description and history ==
The former United Mine Workers of America Building is located in downtown Washington, at the northwest corner of "I" and 15th Streets NW. One facade faces east toward McPherson Square across 15th Street, the other toward I Street. It is a six-story masonry structure, with a frame of steel and terra cotta blocks and an exterior facing of brick, limestone and bluestone. It is essentially Renaissance Revival in style, with tall rounded-arch windows on the second level, which serves as a piano nobile. The first two levels are finished in limestone, the ground floor with a rusticated finish, while the upper floors are mainly clad in buff brick.

The building was originally constructed in 1912 as a five-story building to a design by George Totten, for the University Club, a private social club whose membership included many of the leading men in the city. At that time the second level was primarily a large social space, and the upper floors housed private rooms for the membership. In 1936, the club sold the building to the UMW. It restyled the interior of the building, converting the second floor into a series of meeting spaces and the office of the union president, while the upper levels were used for offices. It also added the sixth floor, removing an elaborate cornice in the process. The UMW vacated the building in 1999, and it has since been adapted for use as a primarily residential space, in part by connecting it to adjoining buildings.

The building's historic significance comes mainly from its role as the UMW headquarters. The union was a major in lobbying for labor-friendly legislation during the New Deal years, and its president, John L. Lewis, was influential in broader labor organizing, founding the CIO in 1935 when the American Federation of Labor refused to support the organization of semi-skilled laborers. Lewis served as the UMW president from 1920 until 1960.

== See also ==
- List of National Historic Landmarks in Washington, D.C.
- National Register of Historic Places listings in central Washington, D.C.
