= Commercial National Bank (Washington, D.C.) =

- U.S. National Register of Historic Places
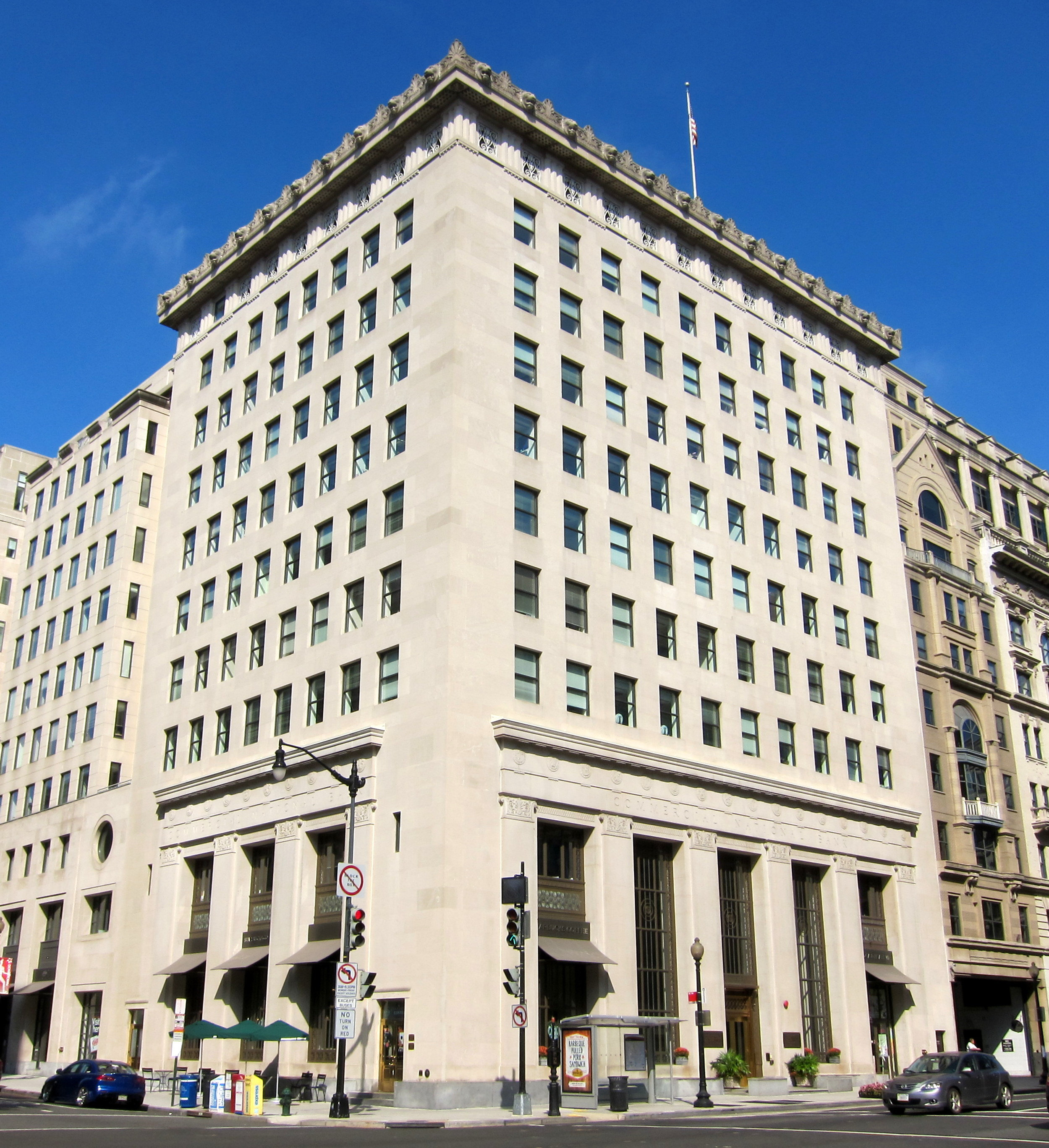
- Commercial National Bank in 2015

- Location within Washington, D.C.
- Location: 1405 G St., NW; Washington, D.C.
- Coordinates: 38°53′54.7″N 77°1′56.3″W
- Built: 1917
- Architect: Waddy B. Wood
- Architectural style: Late 19th and early 20th century American Movements
- NRHP reference No.: 91001488
- Added to NRHP: October 11, 1991

Commercial National Bank is an historic structure located in Downtown Washington, D.C. It was listed on the National Register of Historic Places in 1991.

== History ==
The bank was organized in 1904 and grew to become the fourth largest bank in the city by the 1920s. Its capitol was frozen at the value of its building when it failed in 1933. The building, completed in 1917, was also designed to house Western Union.

== Architecture ==
The building was designed by Washington architect Waddy B. Wood. It is an early example of the simplified and stylized classicism that became popular in the 1920s. The exterior of the 11-story structure features strong corner massing, limestone facades with flattened porticos, a plain ashlar middle section and a prominent cornice. Greek Doric motifs are featured in its austere decoration. The interior of the building has a three-story banking lobby that features monumental columns.
