= Wire Building =

- U.S. National Register of Historic Places
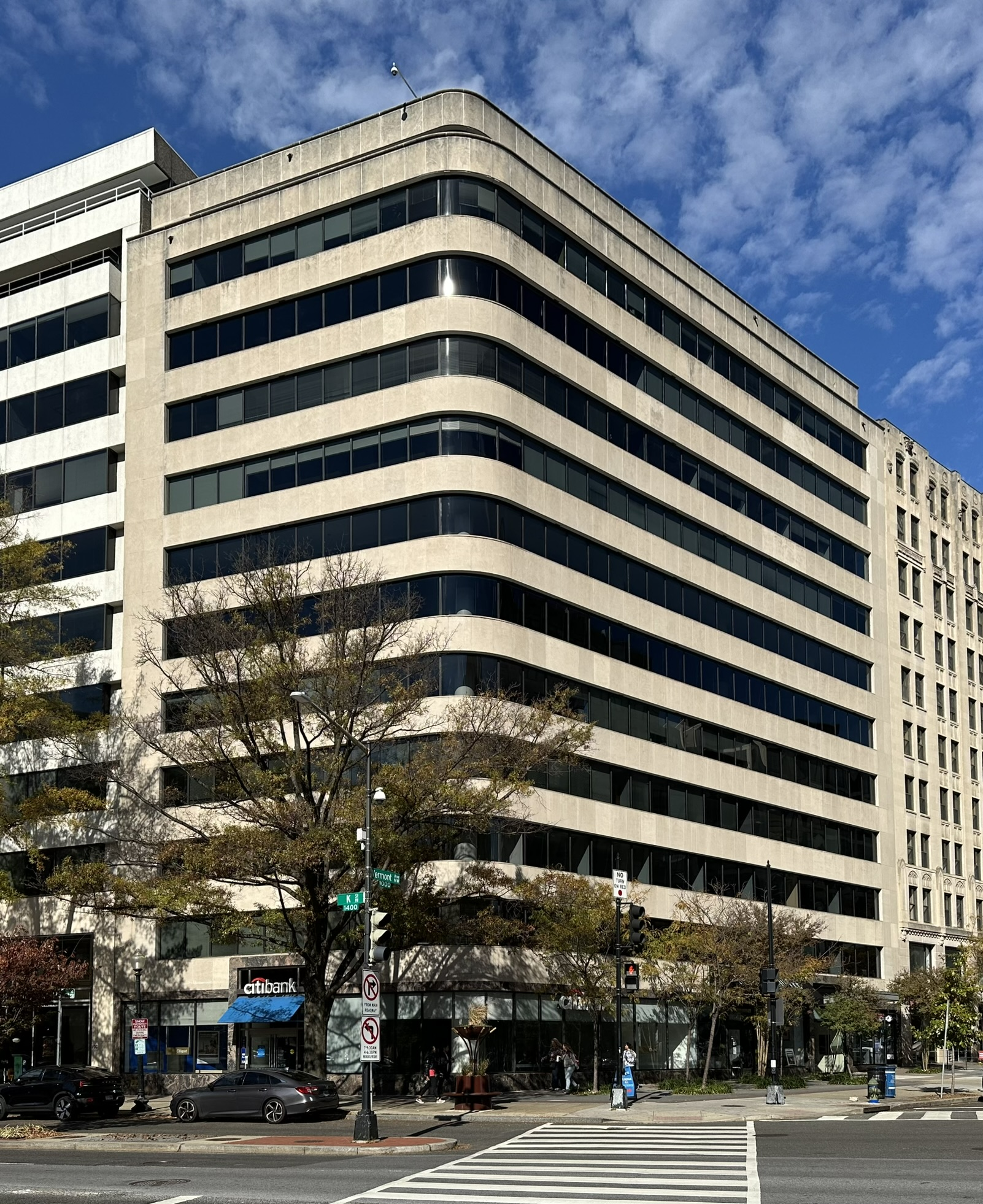
- Wire Building in 2023

- Location within District of Columbia
- Location: 1000 Vermont Ave., NW; Washington, D.C.
- Coordinates: 38°54′10.3176″N 77°02′2.1624″W
- Built: 1949-1950
- Architect: Alvin L. Aubinoe
- Architectural style: Modern
- NRHP reference No.: 12001195
- Added to NRHP: January 23, 2013

The Wire Building is an historic structure located at 1000 Vermont Ave NW at the intersection of Vermont and K Streets, in Downtown Washington, D.C. It was listed on the District of Columbia Inventory of Historic Sites in 2012 and on the National Register of Historic Places in 2013. The building was designed by architect Alvin L. Aubinoe from the architectural firm of Aubinoe and Edwards and built between 1949 and 1950. It is a twelve-story structure, rising to a height of 155.6 feet (47 m).
