= Peyser Building—Security Savings and Commercial Bank =

- U.S. National Register of Historic Places
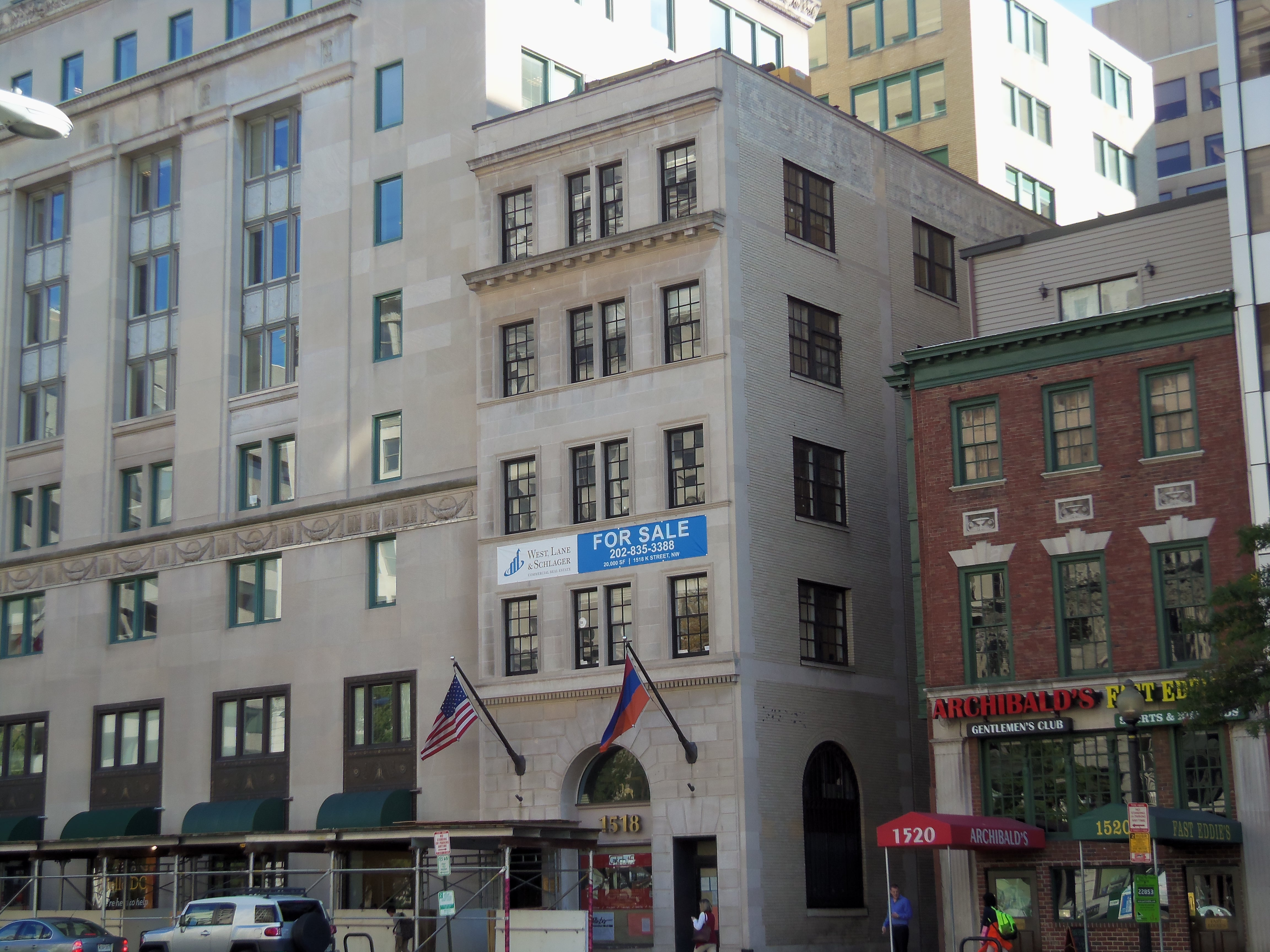
- Peyser Building in 2012

- Location within District of Columbia Location within the United States
- Location: 1518 K St., NW; Washington, D.C.
- Coordinates: 38°54′8.2″N 77°02′7.6″W
- Built: 1927-1928
- Architect: George N. Ray
- MPS: Banks and Financial Institutions MPS
- NRHP reference No.: 12000777
- Added to NRHP: September 10, 2012

The Peyser Building—Security Savings and Commercial Bank is an historic structure located in the Golden Triangle section of Downtown Washington, D.C. It was listed on both the District of Columbia Inventory of Historic Sites and on the National Register of Historic Places in 2012. The building was designed by architect George N. Ray and built between 1927–1928.
