= Anne Marguerite Hyde de Neuville =

French painter

Anne Marguérite Hyde de Neuville
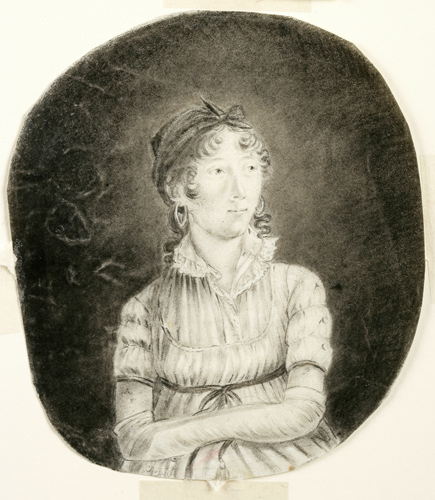
- Self-Portrait, c. 1805-10, Black ink and wash, charcoal, Conté crayon, and graphite on paper mounted on board, New-York Historical Society
- Born: Henriette Anne Marguérite Joséphine Rouillé de Marigny; May 10, 1771
- Died: September 14, 1849 (78 years old)
- Known for: Drawings and watercolors documenting early 19th c. America

Anne Marguérite, Baroness Hyde de Neuville (born Henriette Anne Marguérite Joséphine Rouillé de Marigny, May 10, 1771 - September 14, 1849 ) was a French aristocrat and self-taught watercolorist and artist. She is best known for her drawings of people and landscapes she encountered in her travels in America during the first decades of the 19th century. She left behind a sizable body of work of over 200 watercolors and drawings.

== Early life ==
Anne Marguérite married Jean-Guillaume, baron Hyde de Neuville, on August 23, 1794, in Sancerre when she was twenty-three and Jean-Guiillaume was eighteen years old. Jean-Guillaume, a French Royalist was accused of participating in a plot to assassinate Napoleon Bonaparte in 1800. The couple's property was seized and they went into hiding for several years. In 1805, Anne-Maguérite traveled to Vienna to meet with Napoleon in an attempt to reclaim their estate. Napoleon finally agreed but only if they went into exile in the United States.

The couple arrived in the United States in 1807 and traveled throughout the Northeast. They spent their winters in New York City and established the École Économique, a school for French refugee children in 1808 and which was incorporated in 1810. They purchased land outside of New Brunswick, New Jersey in 1811 where they raised Merino sheep.

Following the abdication of Napoleon in 1814, the couple returned to France. For their loyalty to the monarchy, Jean-Guillaume was named French Ambassador to the United States in 1816. The couple lived in Washington, D.C. until 1822 when they again returned to France where they remained for the rest of their lives.

== Career ==
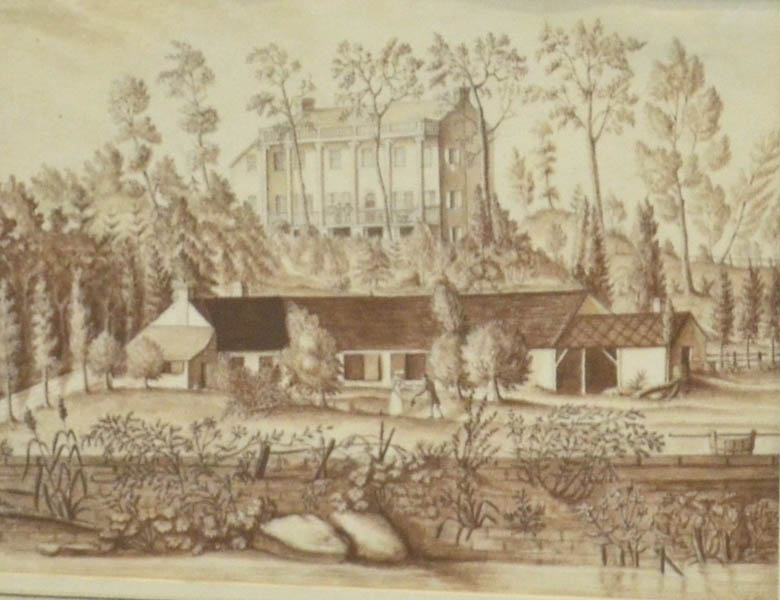
Eleutherian Mills, c. 1817, Sepia ink on paper, Hagley Museum and Library

Not much is known about Anne Marguérite's early years, but like many young girls of her status, she most likely received lessons in draftsmanship. Based on the body of her artwork left behind, it appears she began drawing in earnest around the age of eighteen years. Her early drawings were primarily portraits of family members. Her preferred medium was chalk and graphite during this period.

When Anne Marguérite and Jean-Guillaume went into exile and were still in Europe, they used their time to document the places they stayed and saw. While Jean-Guillaume documented his daily life in writing, Anne Marguérite kept a visual diary of her life in exile. Shortly before they came to the United States in 1807, she began incorporating watercolors into her drawing repertoire, using watercolor for more finished works.

Once in the United States, she used her drawing skills to document her experiences of America. Her sketches of the Hudson River are among some of the earliest documented drawings of the area. Anne Marguérite drew prolifically during her first stay in America, from sketches of friends' homes, to street scenes in the cities they stayed, to portraits of the people around her, including Native Americans, working people, African Americans, and servants.

On the couple's second stay in America, while residing in Washington, D.C. they were the first diplomatic couple to reside at the Decatur House. While she did not have as much time to draw, when she did, Anne Marguérite documented her developing neighborhood, President's Square which is now called Lafayette Square.

== Death and legacy ==
Anne Marguérite and Jean-Guillaume never had any children. Anne Marguérite died in 1849 at the age of 78 years.

Two exhibitions have been put on exploring the Anne-Marguérite's life and artwork. The first was in 1984 curated by the Zimmerli Art Museum entitled, Baroness Hyde de Neuville: Sketches of America, 1807-1822. In 2019 the New York Historical Society held another exhibition of her work entitled, Artist in Exile: The Visual Diary of Baroness Hyde de Neville.

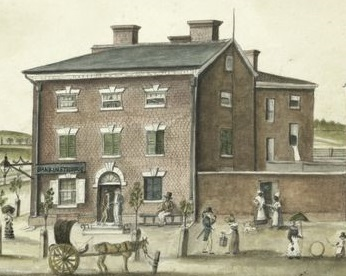
On the corner of F Street Washington next to our house autumn 1817, Watercolor on paper, New York Public Library

Her personal papers are held at Princeton University.

== Works ==
- View of Utica from the hotel September, 1807, New York Public Library
- House of Dupont de Nemours Angelica (NY) 1808, National Museum of Franco-American cooperation, Blérancourt
- Bridewell, and Charity-School, Broadway, Opposite Chamber Street 1808, The Phelps Stokes Collection
- The Moreau House, 1809, Museum of Fine Arts, Boston
- Vue d'amboy et du steam-boat The steamboat the Rariton, 1809, New York Public Library
- Corner of Greenwich Street 1810, The Phelps Stokes Collection
- Economical School 1810–1814, Historic New Orleans Collection
- La Bergerie Farm Hyde Neuville Angelica (NY) 1814, National Museum of Franco-American Cooperation, Blérancourt
- Le coin de F. Street Washington vis-à-vis nôtre maison été de 1817, New York Public Library
- Eleutherian Mills, c. 1817, Hagley Museum and Library
- The House of James Madison to Montpellier, Virginia 1818, Blérancourt, National Museum of Franco-American Cooperation
- Home in Washington in 1818 to the French ambassador, Baron Hyde de Neuville, National Museum of Franco-American Cooperation, Blérancourt
- View of Washington City, 1820, New York Public Library
- White House, ca. 1820, John Anderton collection

Selected works in the collection of the New-York Historical Society:

- Seated African American Scrubwoman, 1807–1822
- Baroness Hyde De Neuville's Cabin on the Eurydice,1816
- The Hyde De Neuville Cabin on the Eurydice, 1816
- sketches from the Economical School Series, 1810–1814
- Portrait of a Cherokee Man, 1820
- Hudson Highlands from Newburgh Bay, 1807
- The Cottage, 1813
- Portrait of an Indian Chief, Red Jacket (c.1758-1830?), 1807
- Mary, a Squaw of the Oneida Tribe, 1807
- Portrait of Seneca Squaw and Papoose, Western New York, 1808
- Incomplete Bridge, Palatine, New York, 1808
- Portrait of an Indian Chief (Chief of the Little Osage [after St. Memin]), c.1811-13
- Oneida Family, 1807
- Portrait of an American Indian Girl of Ballston Springs, New York, 1807
- Fair American Indian Man of the Buffalo Tribe, Canisteo, New York, 1808
- Portrait of Peter of Buffalo, Tonawanda, New York, possibly chief Tall Peter, or Peter Blacksnake, 1807
- Dutch Houses on State Street, Albany, New York, 1807
- Self-Portrait, c.1805-10
- St. John's Church, President's Square, Washington D.C., 1822
