= Running Horses =

Sculpture in Portland, Oregon, U.S.

- The sculpture in 2015
- Artist: Tom Hardy
- Year: 1986
- Type: Sculpture
- Medium: Bronze
- Subject: Horses
- Dimensions: 0.91 m × 3.0 m × 0.61 m (3 ft × 10 ft × 2 ft)
- Condition: "Well maintained" (1994)
- Location: Portland, Oregon, United States; 45°30′58″N 122°40′49″W
- Owner: City of Portland and Multnomah County Public Art Collection courtesy of the Regional Arts & Culture Council

Running Horses is an outdoor 1986 bronze sculpture by Tom Hardy, located on the Transit Mall in downtown Portland, Oregon. It is part of the City of Portland and Multnomah County Public Art Collection courtesy of the Regional Arts & Culture Council.

== Description and history ==
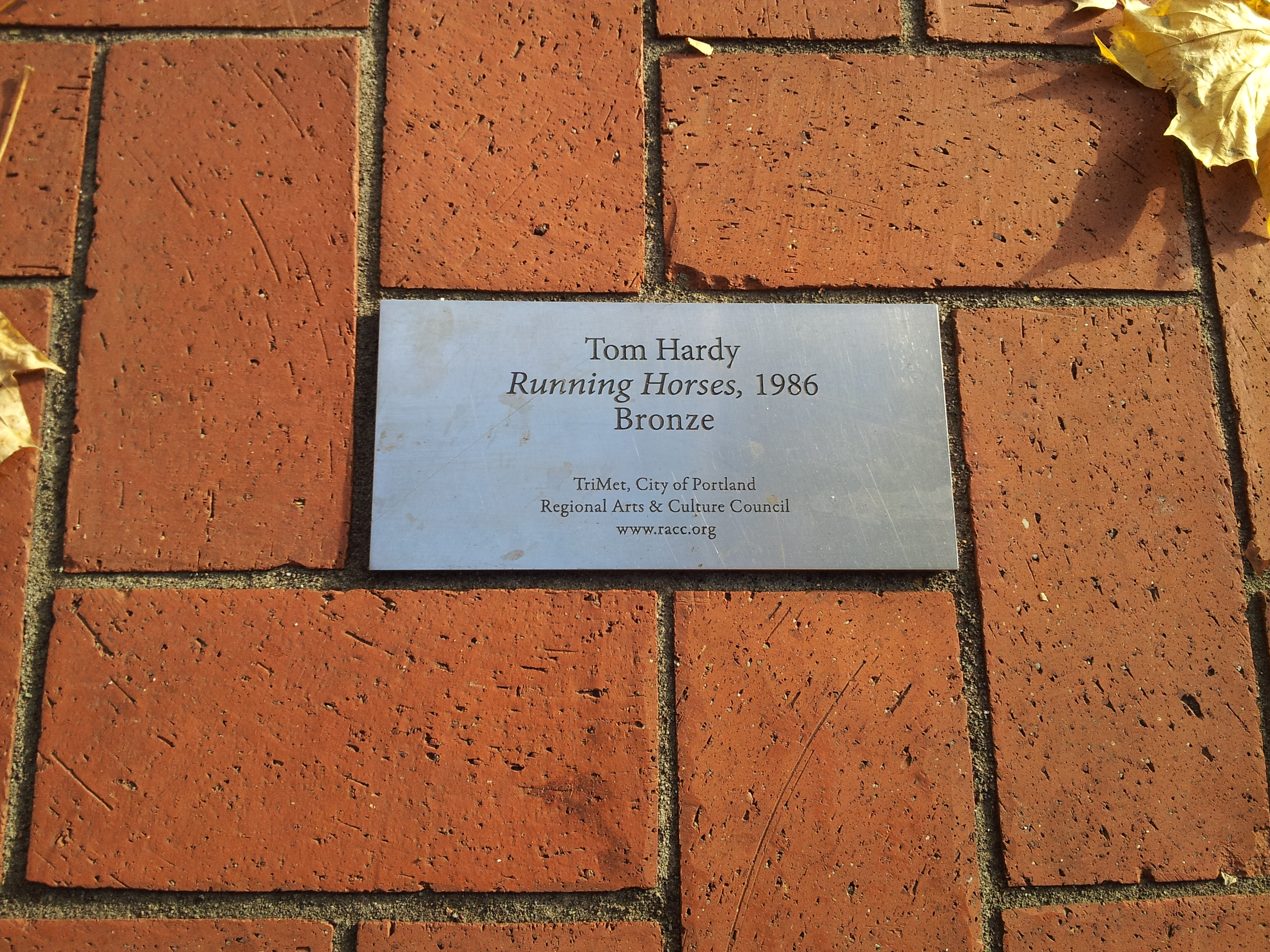
Plaque for the sculpture

Running Horses is an abstract bronze sculpture by Tom Hardy, completed in 1986 and originally installed at the southeast corner of Pioneer Courthouse Square at the intersection of Southwest Yamhill and 6th Avenue. It depicts three horses in the act of running and was donated to the City of Portland by Bill Roberts. The sculpture measures approximately 3 feet (0.91 m) x 10 feet (3.0 m) x 2 feet (0.61 m) and rests on a bronze base that measures approximately 4 feet, 7 inches x 21 inches (0.53 m) x 21.25 inches (0.540 m). It is attached to the base by the front legs of the center horse. Inscriptions include "Tom Hardy", near his signature, "KNOW", and the signatures of Pete Fradin, Alan Peterson, Al Goldsby and Sam Dalmage. While installed at Pioneer Courthouse Square, the base was fixed to a low brick wall which served as a bench.

The sculpture was surveyed and considered "well maintained" by the Smithsonian Institution's "Save Outdoor Sculpture!" program in January 1994. It was administered by the City of Portland's Metropolitan Arts Commission then. In 2009, the sculpture was re-sited in front of the Gus J. Solomon United States Courthouse at the intersection of Southwest 6th Avenue and Southwest Madison Street in the Portland Transit Mall. Presently, the piece is part of the City of Portland and Multnomah County Public Art Collection courtesy of the Regional Arts & Culture Council.

== See also ==
- 1986 in art
- Hatfield Fountain (1989) by Tom Hardy, Lawrence Halprin, and Scott Stickney (Salem, Oregon)
- Horses in art
- Untitled (Hardy), Eugene, Oregon (1952)
