= Solomon Courthouse =

Solomon Courthouse may refer to one of two United States federal court buildings:

- Joel W. Solomon Federal Building and United States Courthouse, Nashville, Tennessee
- Gus J. Solomon United States Courthouse, Portland, Oregon
