= Park Blocks =

Park Blocks may refer to:

- North Park Blocks, Portland, Oregon
- Park Blocks (Eugene, Oregon)
- South Park Blocks, Portland, Oregon
