= The Jefferson =

Hotel in Washington, D.C., USA

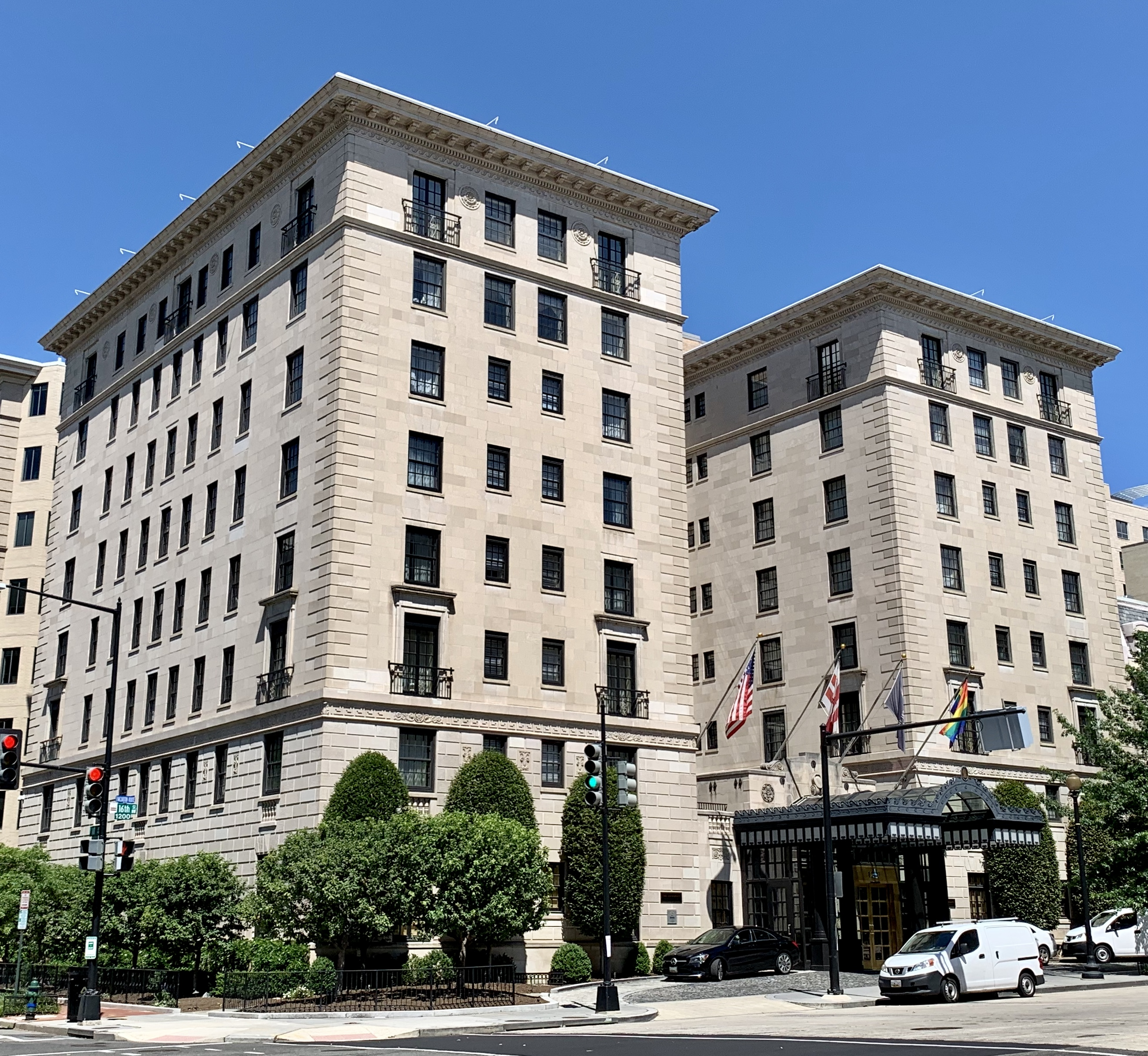
- The Jefferson in July 2020
- Interactive map of the The Jefferson area

General information
- Location: United States, 1200 16th Street NW, Washington, D.C.
- Coordinates: 38.903996°N 77.036911°W
- Opening: 1955
- Cost: $900,000 (1922)
- Owner: DC CAP Hotelier
- Operator: Ogden CAP

Technical details
- Floor count: 8

Design and construction
- Architect: Jules Henri de Sibour
- Developer: The F. H. Smith Co.
- Awards: Michelin key

Other information
- Number of rooms: 99 (including suites)
- Number of suites: 20
- Number of restaurants: 2

Website
- www.jeffersondc.com

The Jefferson, Washington, DC is a boutique hotel located at 1200 16th Street NW in Washington, D.C., in the United States. It has also been known as The Jefferson Hotel. It was built from 1922 to 1923, and was initially an apartment building. After housing war workers during World War II, the structure was converted to a hotel in 1954. It became better known after a 1980 renovation, and became a Washington landmark. It was sold in 1989, 2000, and 2005, and underwent a two-year, multimillion-dollar renovation that revealed the building's original atrium skylight. It reopened in 2009.

== Apartment building history ==
The F. H. Smith Corporation, a local real estate developer of apartment and office buildings, began construction on The Jefferson, an eight-story, 74-unit apartment building, in July 1922. Cost of construction was $900,000 ($17,311,133 in 2025 dollars), and the building was originally owned by The Jefferson Corporation. The architect was Jules Henri de Sibour, who designed the building in the Beaux-Arts architectural style. The building was named for Thomas Jefferson, the former President of the United States and Founding Father.

In April 1930, The Jefferson Corp. was forced into bankruptcy by its creditors. As the trial progressed, evidence emerged that the F. H. Smith Corp. had signed secret agreements to allow its chairman, G. Bryan Pitts, to occupy an entire floor of the building (17 rooms, including five baths) rent-free, which had caused The Jefferson Corporation's financial difficulties. Pitts and other F. H. Smith officers were charged with embezzlement. As the trial continued, a former Smith Corp. officer testified that he had destroyed evidence to cover up the crime. Pitts and several others were found guilty and sentenced to 23 years in prison.

In 1931, Alfred Robinson Glancy, a General Motors executive, purchased the building from the bankrupt Jefferson Corp. for an undisclosed sum.

== Hotel history ==
=== Glancy ownership ===
The Jefferson partially converted to a hotel in 1941 to serve workers mobilizing for a potential war with Nazi Germany and Imperial Japan. It provided both short-term rentals (like a hotel) and residential needs. It eliminated its residential services and converted completely into a hotel in 1955.

Glancy died in 1959, and in 1960 his heirs purchased 1214 16th Street NW, a four-story building adjacent to the north side of the hotel, for use as office space. By 1963, The Jefferson's 74 rooms had been subdivided, creating 150 hotel rooms. The hotel's main floor sported a dining room and cocktail lounge named "The Elbow Room". The hotel was not considered luxurious by the standards of the day, but it had a great deal of cachet with artists, musicians, theater and movie stars, and top domestic and foreign government officials. Among those who stayed there in the 1950s were actress Helen Hayes, actor Tyrone Power and orchestra conductor Leopold Stokowski.

=== Williams ownership ===
In March 1963, Glancy's heirs sold The Jefferson to the American Realty Trust Co. of Arlington, Virginia, for $1 million ($10,516,304 in 2025 dollars). Famous guests at the hotel in the 1960s included comedian and pianist Victor Borge, actress Carol Channing, pianist Van Cliburn, actress Vivien Leigh, theatrical producer David Merrick, and writer Katherine Anne Porter. Neil Sheehan and colleagues at The New York Times used a room to organize the Pentagon Papers for publication in spring 1971.

American Realty Trust sold The Jefferson in January 1976 to attorney and sports team owner Edward Bennett Williams for $1.8 million ($10,184,211 in 2025 dollars). By this time, the hotel had created a number of large suites out of some of the smaller rooms, leaving the hotel with just 98 rooms and suites. Williams began to improve the hotel's luxuriousness, emphasizing its "European style" and immaculate rooms. In 1980, Williams began a multimillion-dollar, two-year renovation of the hotel. The renovation replaced most of the guest-room and public space furniture with antiques, and original American artwork from the past 200 years graced walls throughout the hotel. Williams also built an extensive collection of documents signed by the hotel's namesake, Thomas Jefferson.

Williams was a confidante of a number of presidents (Republican and Democrat), and The Jefferson became a favorite hotel of top officials in the Reagan administration. The hotel's reputation for discretion continued to attract some of the most famous visitors to the city, and in the 1980s actress Candice Bergen, writer William F. Buckley Jr., economist John Kenneth Galbraith, film director Louis Malle, and actor Jason Robards stayed there. Members of President George H. W. Bush's family stayed there prior to Bush's inauguration as President, and the president-elect chose most of his cabinet while staying at The Jefferson. The hotel was also the home of former Senator John Tower during confirmation hearings for his unsuccessful 1989 nomination as United States Secretary of Defense. Radio talk show host Larry King broadcast from the hotel the first Friday every month in the mid and late 1980s.

=== Value Enhancement Fund III ownership ===
Edward Bennett Williams died in August 1988, and his widow, Agnes Williams, sought to sell the hotel. Rose Narva, the hotel's long-time and popular managing director, organized a consortium of investors to purchase the hotel for $25 million ($64,932,886 in 2025 dollars) and retain her as the manager. Her bid was topped by the Aoki Corp., a Japanese construction and real estate investment company, which signed a letter of intent in February 1989 to purchase the "landmark" hotel for $30 million ($77,919,463 in 2025 dollars). The company subsequently backed out of the purchase agreement, apparently after real estate experts said the $30 million price would have been far too high.

In April 1989, Paine Webber Realty (a subsidiary of the Paine Webber stock brokerage firm) purchased the hotel from Agnes Williams for $28 million ($72,724,832 in 2025 dollars). This was a record per-room price for a hotel in Washington, D.C., at the time. Paine Webber Realty acted as the agent for Value Enhancement Fund III, a group of Japanese institutional investors. The fund subsequently hired the Lancaster Group, owner and manager of luxury hotels nationwide, to manage the hotel when Narva's contract expired in 1990. By this time, the hotel was charging anywhere from $175 ($431 in 2025 dollars) a night for a standard room to $1,000 ($2,464 in 2025 dollars) a night for its William French Smith Suite (which was named after the former U.S. Attorney General who once lived in the hotel). The expense of running the luxury property, however, was high, and The Jefferson generated just $550,000 ($1,428,523 in 2025 dollars) a year in earnings in 1989. A year after the Lancaster Group took over, rates for a standard room had risen to $200 ($473 in 2025 dollars) to $340 ($804 in 2025 dollars) a night. The hotel underwent another multimillion-dollar refurbishment about 1999. Each room now featured an extensive built-in mini-bar, two telephone lines, a built-in music center, Internet access, and a fax machine.

In November 2000, Value Enhancement Fund III hired Loews Hotels to manage The Jefferson. George W. Bush stayed in the hotel prior to his 2001 inauguration as President, and the fund renovated the hotel again later that year. As part of the refurbishment, each room now received its own unique set of furniture and furnishings. This included canopy beds and mahogany and hickory armoires with built-in mini-bars, and the wood-burning fireplaces (in those rooms equipped with them) were restored to operation. Each room was also outfitted with a 25-inch (64 cm) television, marble bathroom sinks, and new bed frames and mattresses.

The hotel continued to attract entertainers throughout the 1990s and 2000s, such as singer and actress Barbra Streisand (who stayed there in the early 1990s).

=== DC CAP Hotelier ownership ===
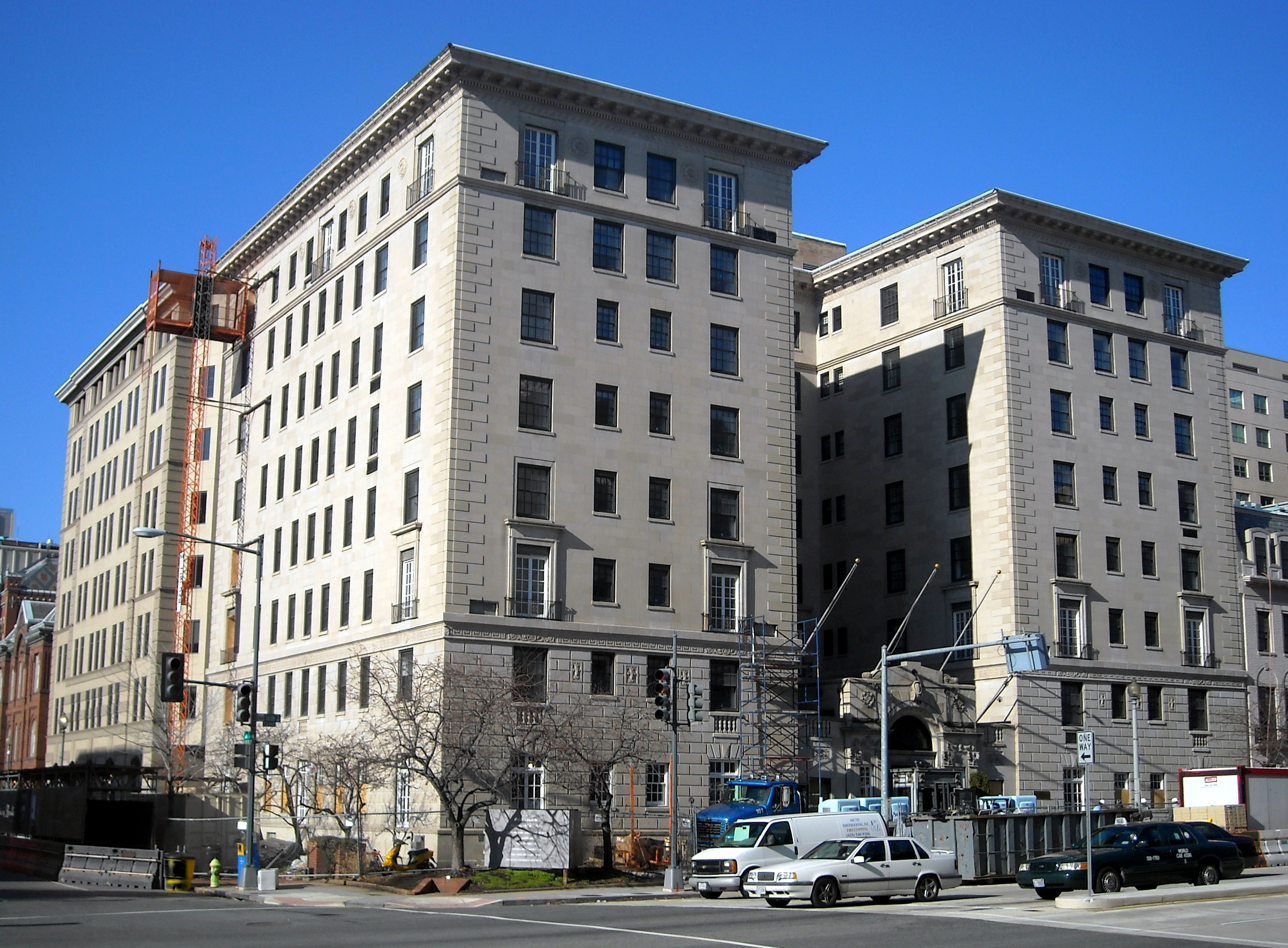
The Jefferson undergoing renovation in 2009

The Jefferson was purchased in June 2005 by DC CAP Hotelier, a New York-based real estate firm. Loews managed the hotel until July 2005, after which the owners hired Kor Hotel Group, a Los Angeles-based manager of luxury hotels, as the hotel's new overseer. By now, The Jefferson had 32 suites, and had created about 2,500 square feet (230 m^{2}) of meeting space. This space was divided among five rooms, which had occupancy limits ranging from 15 to 150 people.

Kor Hotel Group began a major redesign of the hotel in 2005, and The Jefferson closed in March 2007 to begin its overhaul. During the renovations, the building's skylight was uncovered for the first time in decades, and the lobby's dropped ceiling was removed to expose the original barrel vault. Many of the building's structural elements were repaired, strengthened, and upgraded, and the HVAC and mechanical systems gutted and replaced. The hotel was expected to reopen on September 1, 2008, but much more structural deterioration had occurred than was anticipated and the hotel did not reopen until August 2009. Renovated guest bathrooms now featured television screens embedded in the mirrors and deep "soaker" bathtubs, while guest living and sleeping spaces now featured individualized custom drapes and custom-designed beds covered in European linens featuring images of Jefferson's Virginia home, Monticello. The overall feel of guest-rooms was meant to reflect a Paris apartment. The hotel cocktail lounge was completely remodeled as well, and now featured an orange colored bar countertop of molded glass embedded with optical fibers that made it glow. The hotel retained its Federalist interior design style in its public spaces, including the unique antique furniture, artwork, and displays of Jefferson-signed documents. New amenities included a butler assigned to each guest-room, and room service trays containing microchips that alerted staff whenever the tray was deposited in a hallway. The cost of the renovation was not disclosed.

The Jefferson continued to emphasize its discretion and private nature after the 2008–2009 renovation.

The hotel increased its prices after the renovation by about $100 ($150 in 2025 dollars) a night. Off-season standard guest-room rates ran from $380 ($570 in 2025 dollars) to $450 ($675 in 2025 dollars) a night, while height-of-season rates ranged from $450 ($675 in 2025 dollars) to $650 ($975 in 2025 dollars). Suites went for $850 ($1,276 in 2025 dollars) a night. The new prices made The Jefferson one of Washington's priciest hotels, alongside the Four Seasons and The Ritz-Carlton.

== Dining and amenities ==
The Jefferson has 99 rooms, which includes 20 suites. Rates for standard guest rooms began at $375 a night in January 2016. Some suites have small, private balconies with views of the Washington Monument. Two master suites, the Thomas Jefferson Suite and the Martha Jefferson Suite, occupy the top floors. The larger is the Thomas Jefferson Suite, which has five balconies and contains 1,900 square feet (180 m^{2}) of space.

The Jefferson's cocktail lounge is known as Quill, and Forbes Travel Guide said it is rumored to be President Barack Obama's favorite hotel space in Washington, D.C.

The Jefferson has two restaurants, the Plume and the less formal The Greenhouse. Several small private rooms, capable of seating two or three people, open onto Plume to accommodate more private discussions among guests. Plume received four stars from Forbes Travel Guide. Since 2014, Ralf Schlegel has been the executive chef at Plume, which received a Michelin Star in the 2017 Michelin Guide for Washington, D.C.

The ground floor of the hotel also features the Book Room, a reading library stocked with books either printed in the late 1700s and early 1800s.

The hotel has four private, obscure entrances for its celebrity or security-conscious guests.

== Rating ==
In 2010, The Jefferson was admitted into Relais & Châteaux, a global association of luxury hotels.

Forbes Travel Guide (formerly known as Mobil Guide) awarded the hotel four out of five stars in 2016.

In January 2016, U.S. News & World Report ranked The Jefferson Hotel the second-best hotel in the United States. The hotel had ranked tenth in 2015 and 99th in 2014.

In June 2024, Americas Great Resorts added the hotel to its Top Picks as a landmark property.

== See also ==
- Sixteenth Street Historic District

== Bibliography ==
- Kohler, Sue A.; Carson, Jeffrey R. (1978). Sixteenth Street Architecture. Washington, D.C.: U.S. Commission of Fine Arts. hdl:2027/mdp.39015014062684.
