= Chase's Theater and Riggs Building =

- U.S. National Register of Historic Places
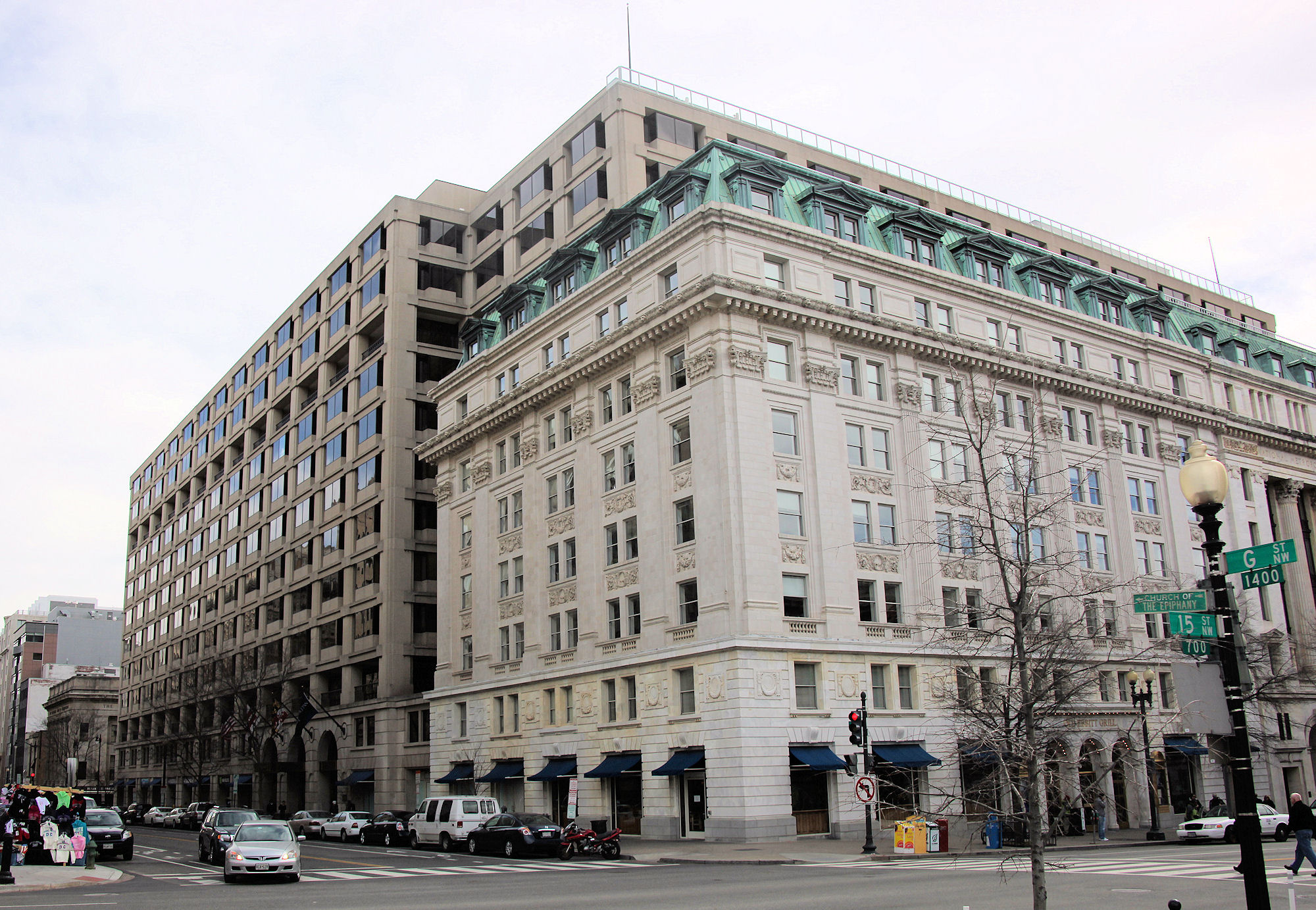
- Chase's Theater and Riggs Building in 2011

- Location within Central Washington, D.C. Location within the District of Columbia Location within the United States
- Location: 1426 G Street and 615-627 15th Street, N.W., Washington, D.C.
- Coordinates: 38°53′53.2″N 77°1′59.9″W
- Built: 1912
- Architect: Jules Henri de Sibour
- Architectural style: Beaux-Arts
- NRHP reference No.: 78003053
- Added to NRHP: September 7, 1978

The Chase's Theater and Riggs Building, also known as the Keith-Albee Theater and the Keith-Albee Building, was a historic building located at 1426 G Street and 615-627 15th Street, Northwest, Washington, D.C., in the city's Downtown area.

== History ==
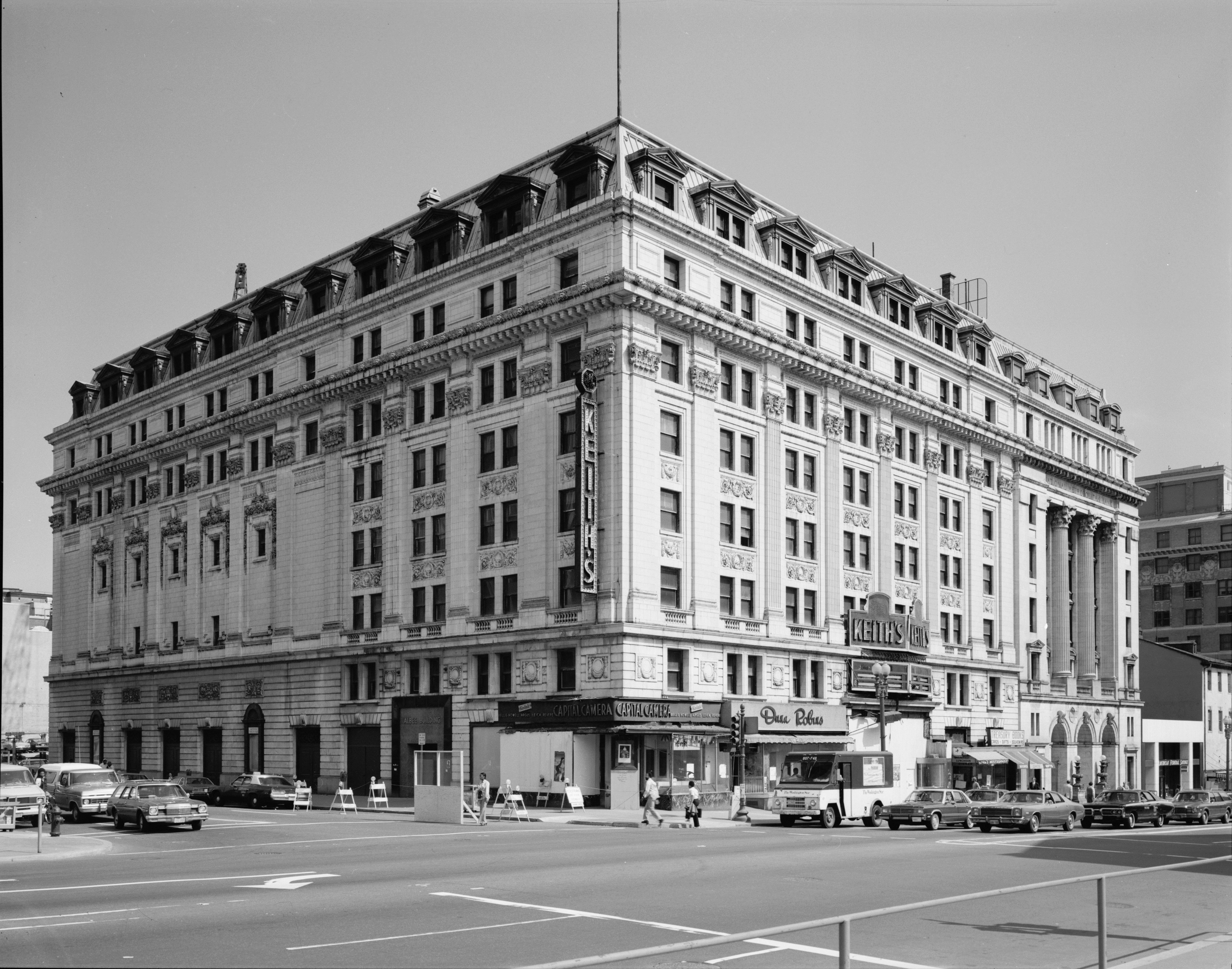
Keith theater in 1979

The Beaux-Arts theater was originally designed by Jules Henri de Sibour, and built in 1912, for Plimpston B. Chase. He sold the theater to B.F. Keith in 1913. It was a part of the B.F. Keith vaudeville circuit, which became a part of the Keith-Albee-Orpheum chain, and then RKO Pictures. William Howard Taft attended the opening in 1912, and Woodrow Wilson regularly attended. Entertainers included: Will Rogers, Eddie Cantor, Rudy Vallée, Laurel and Hardy, and ZaSu Pitts.

In 1956, RKO sold the building, to Morris Cafritz for $1.55 million. In 1959, he offered to sell the building to the city as a performing arts center, but the city would not assume the $1.5 million mortgage. The movie theater closed in 1978; it was placed on the National Register of Historic Places.

In March 1978, the United States Commission of Fine Arts recommended saving the facade of the Keith-Albee Theater and National Metropolitan Bank.

In 1979, the D.C. Superior Court halted demolition of the Keith Albee building, but then allowed demolition of the interior. The developer said he would preserve the historic facade of the Keith-Albee theater building, if he could demolish Rhodes' Tavern.

It is now the Metropolitan Square office building.

== See also ==
- National Register of Historic Places listings in the District of Columbia
- Theater in Washington D.C.
