= Three Standing Forms =

Sculpture in Eugene, Oregon, U.S.

- The sculpture in 2015
- Artist: Jan Zach
- Year: 1959
- Type: Sculpture
- Medium: Sculpture: Iron, rock Base: Basalt, granite
- Dimensions: 15 m × 20 m × 6.1 m (49 ft × 66 ft × 20 ft)
- Condition: "Treatment needed" (1993)
- Location: Eugene, Oregon, United States; 44.050905°N 123.091864°W

Three Standing Forms is an outdoor 1959 sculpture by Jan Zach, installed at the intersection of 8th Avenue and West Park Street, in Eugene, Oregon's Park Blocks, in the United States.

== Description and history ==
The abstract sculpture, made of iron welded onto rock, measures approximately 49 inches (1.2 m) x 66 inches (1.7 m) x 20 inches (0.51 m). It rests on a granite and basalt base that measures approximately 12.5 inches (0.32 m) x 78 inches (2.0 m) x 17.5 inches (0.44 m). The work was surveyed and deemed "treatment need" by Smithsonian Institution's "Save Outdoor Sculpture!" program in August 1993.

== See also ==
- 1959 in art
