= Ventana al Pacifico =

Sculpture in Portland, Oregon

- Window on the Pacific (English)
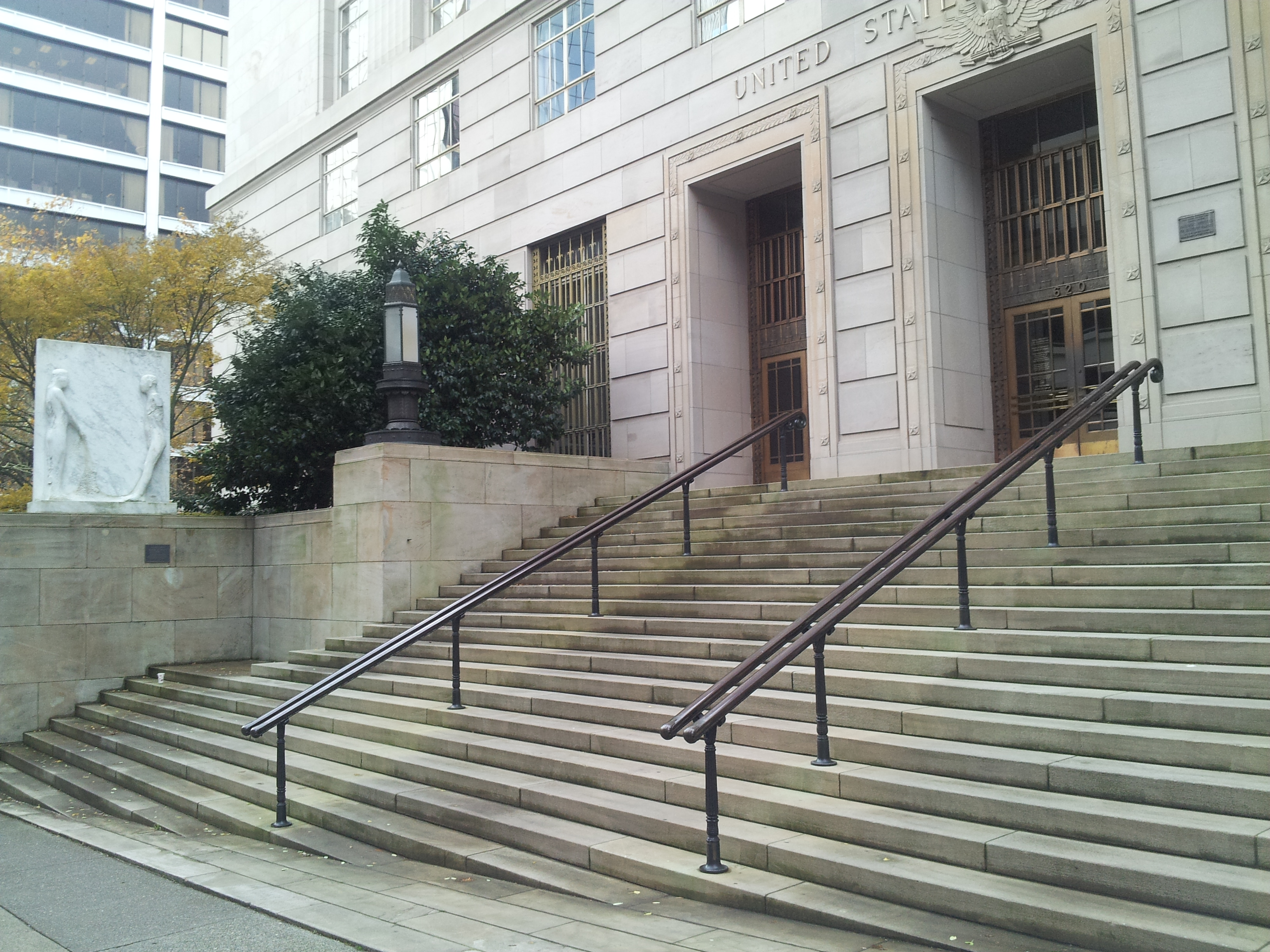
- The sculpture at the main entrance to the Gus J. Solomon United States Courthouse in 2014
- Artist: Manuel Neri
- Year: 1989
- Type: Sculpture
- Medium: Marble
- Condition: "Well maintained" (1993)
- Location: Portland, Oregon, United States; 45.516422°N 122.680497°W

Ventana al Pacifico ("Window on the Pacific" in English) is an outdoor 1989 marble sculpture by Manuel Neri, located outside of the Gus J. Solomon United States Courthouse in downtown Portland, Oregon.

== History ==
Ventana al Pacifico was designed by Manuel Neri and dedicated in April 1989, having been commissioned by the General Services Administration in 1987. It was installed east of the main entrance to the Gus J. Solomon United States Courthouse, near the intersection of Southwest 6th and Southwest Main Street.

The work was surveyed and considered "well maintained" by the Smithsonian's "Save Outdoor Sculpture!" program in October 1993. It was co-administered by General Services Administration departments in both Portland and Washington, D.C. at that time.

== Description ==
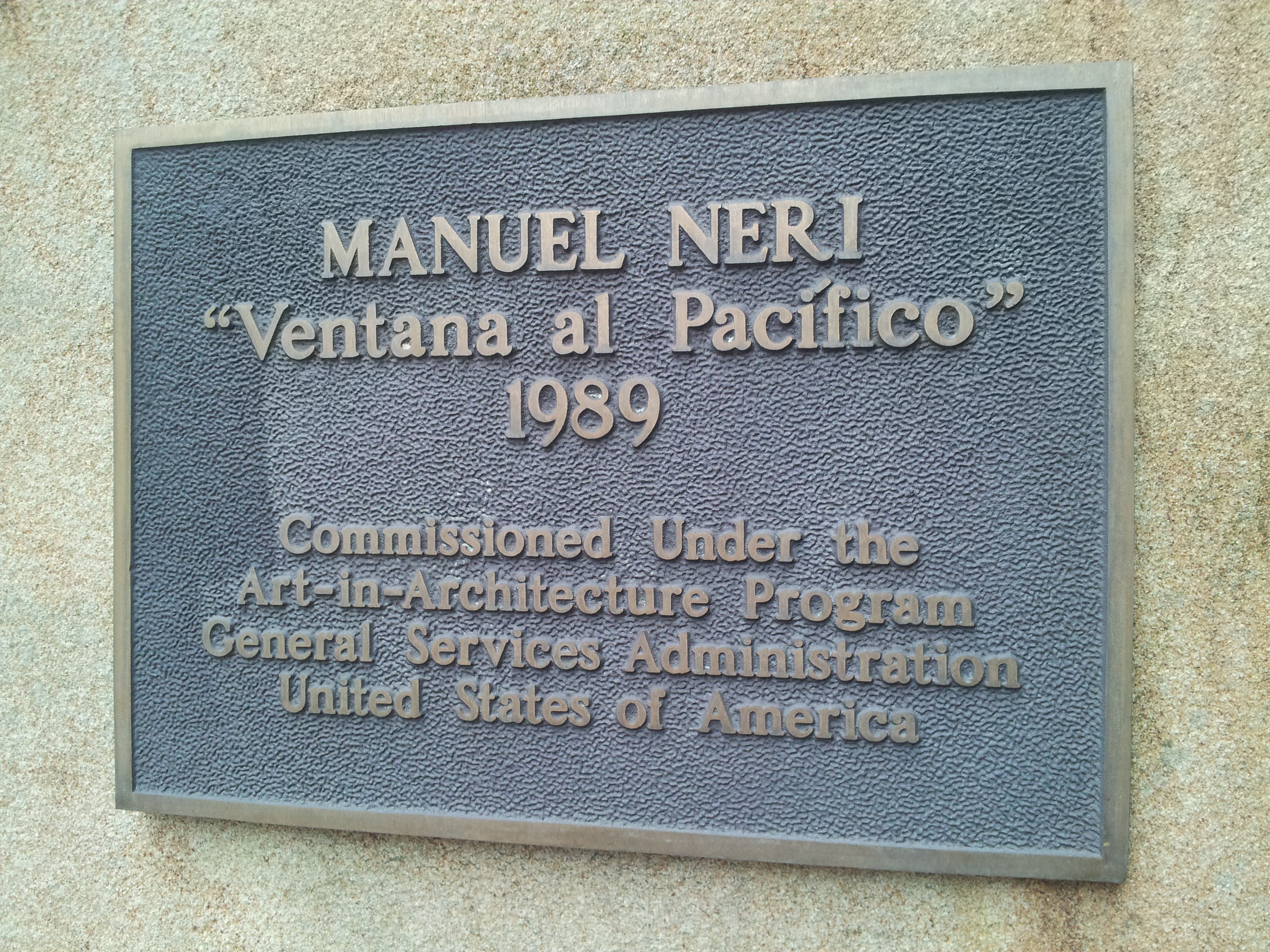
Plaque for the sculpture

The modern figurative sculpture is made from white Carrara marble and measures approximately 98 inches (2.5 m) x 74 inches (1.9 m) x 30 inches (0.76 m). The Smithsonian Institution categorizes the sculpture as an abstract relief and describes it as the following: "Vertical slab with figures in high-relief. On the east side there is a female figure emerging from the stone, on the west side there are two androgynous like figures facing each other."

Accompanying the sculpture is a plaque which reads: MANUEL NERI / "Ventana al Pacifico" / 1989 / Commissioned Under the / Art-in-Architecture Program / General Services Administration / United States of America.

== See also ==
- 1989 in art
