= McLachlen Building =

- U.S. National Register of Historic Places
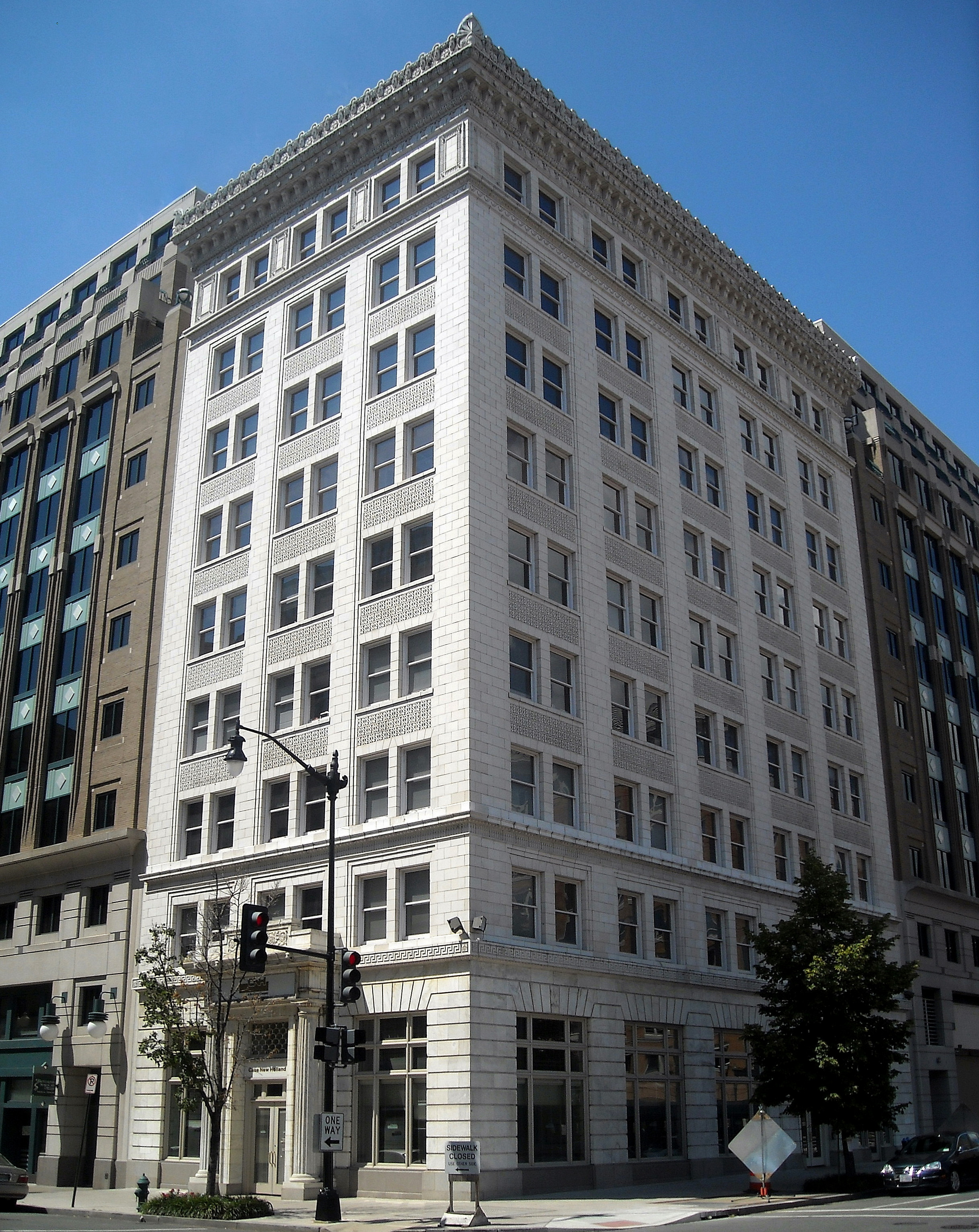
- McLachlen Building in 2008

- Location within Washington, D.C.
- Location: 1001 G St., NW; Washington, D.C.
- Coordinates: 38°53′54″N 77°1′35″W
- Built: 1910-1911
- Architect: Jules Henri de Sibour
- Architectural style: Classical Revival
- NRHP reference No.: 86003042
- Added to NRHP: November 6, 1986

The McLachlen Building is a historic structure located in Downtown Washington, D.C. It has been listed on the District of Columbia Inventory of Historic Sites since 1985, and it was listed on the National Register of Historic Places in 1986.

== History ==
The building was built to house a family-run bank that was organized in 1887, and was developed through a real estate investment partnership. It was built from 1910 to 1911 and was altered in a renovation from 1988 to 1989. The banking room, which is still in existence, is on the main floor of the building and has rental office spaces above.

== Architecture ==
The building was designed by prominent Washington architect Jules Henri de Sibour in the Classical Revival style with elements of the Chicago School. The nine-story structure occupies a corner lot. The exterior of the building is faced with ornamented marble and glazed terra cotta with textured spandrels. It features a Doric entrance and an exuberant cornice.
