= Thomas Hawkins Hanson =

Continental Army officer (1750–1812)

Thomas Hawkins Hanson, Sr. (1750–1812) was a planter from Maryland. He was born in Maryland to Samuel and Anne Hanson. Hanson served as a captain in the Continental Army during the American Revolutionary War.

He married a widow, Rebecca (Dulaney) Addison, and the couple lived at Oxon Hill Manor in Prince George's County, Maryland. Their son, Thomas Hawkins Hanson, Jr., was born in Annapolis, Maryland on March 4, 1792, and General Thomas Grafton Hanson was a grandson of Hanson Jr.

Hanson was a nephew of John Hanson, a Maryland planter and public official who served as President of the Continental Congress. John Hanson died at Oxon Hill Manor during a visit there.
