= Untitled (Hardy) =

Fountain and sculpture by Tom Hardy in Eugene, Oregon, U.S.

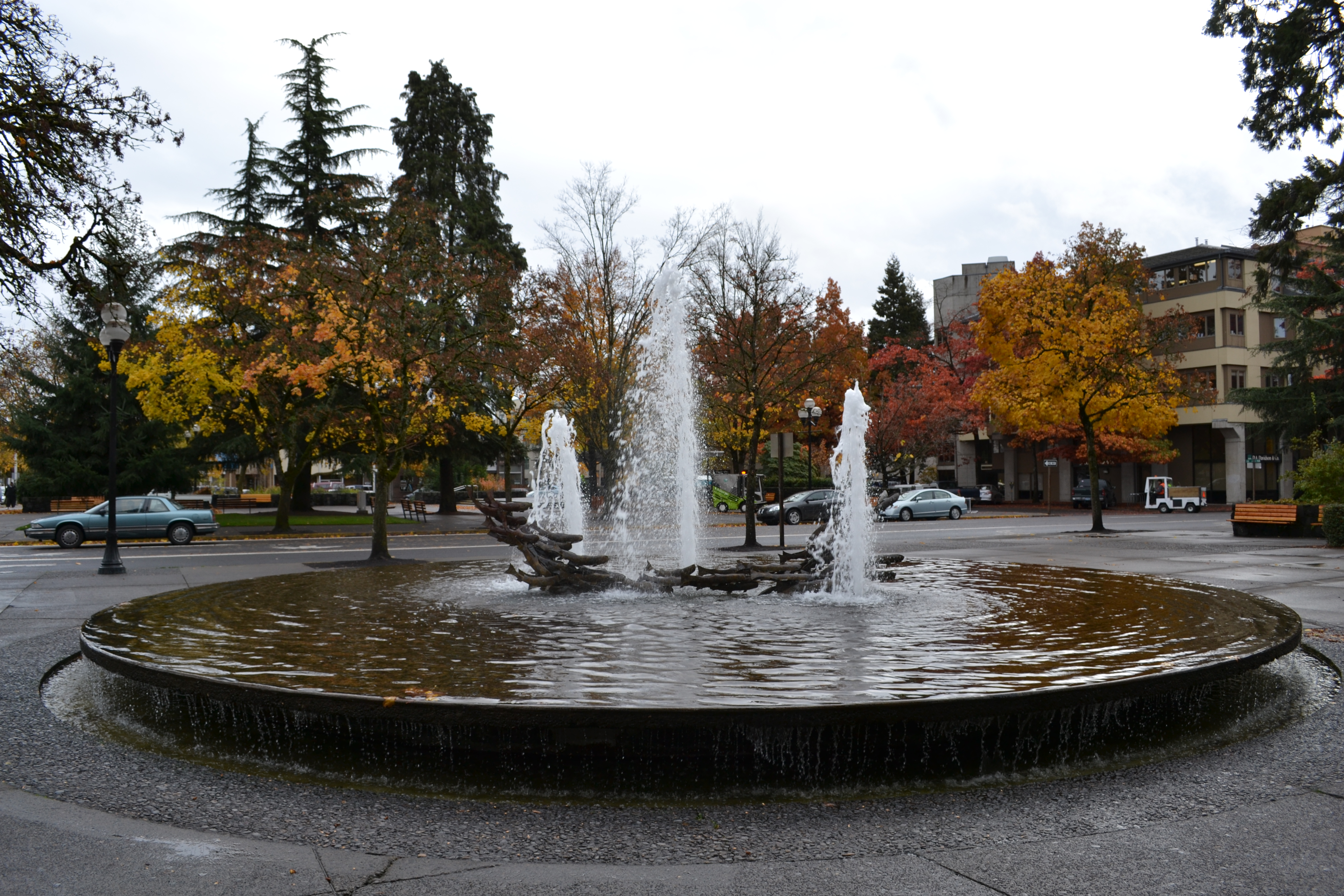
- The fountain and sculpture in 2011
- Artist: Tom Hardy
- Year: 1952
- Type: Fountain, sculpture
- Medium: Sculpture: Bronze; Base: Concrete, stone
- Subject: Fish
- Condition: "Well maintained" (1993)
- Location: Eugene, Oregon, United States; 44.05082°N 123.09145°W

Untitled is an outdoor 1952 fountain and sculpture by Tom Hardy, installed at the Park Blocks in Eugene, Oregon, United States.

== Description and history ==
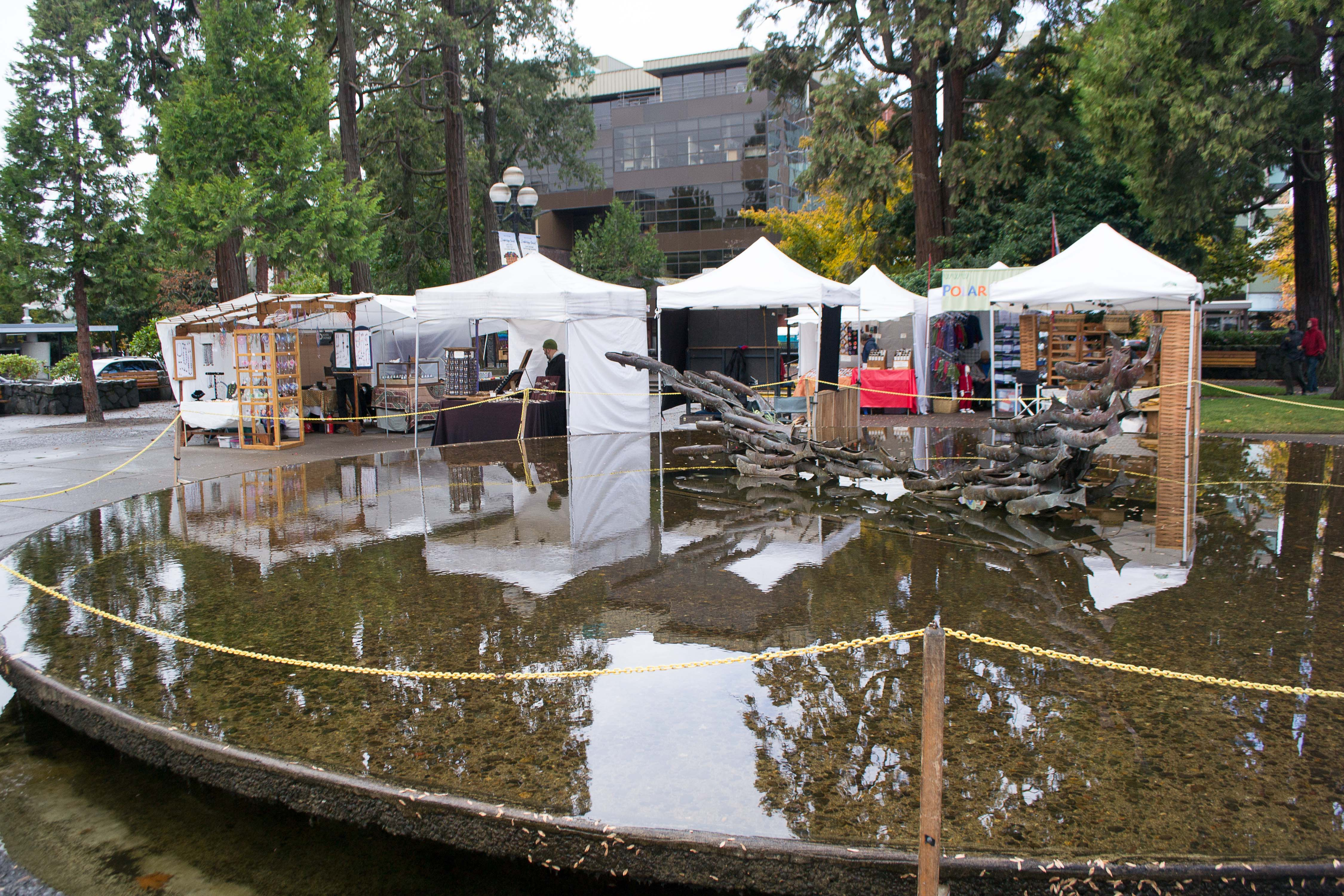
The fountain during Eugene Saturday Market

Tom Hardy's untitled fountain (1952) is installed at the northeast corner of Eugene's Park Blocks, near the intersection of 8th Avenue and Oak Street. The fountain's bronze sculpture depicts a school of fish, possibly salmon, jumping in and out of the water and measures approximately 69 inches (1.8 m) x 18 feet (5.5 m), 8 inches (0.20 m) x 5 feet (1.5 m). Surrounding the sculpture are five water jets. The fountain's base is made of concrete and embedded stones, and measures approximately 24 inches (0.61 m) x 40 feet (12 m) x 40 feet (12 m).

The work was surveyed and deemed "well maintained" by the Smithsonian Institution's "Save Outdoor Sculpture!" program in August 1993. It was administered the Cultural Services Division of the City of Eugene's Library, Recreation and Cultural Services Department at that time.

== See also ==
- 1952 in art
- Hatfield Fountain (1989) by Tom Hardy, Lawrence Halprin, and Scott Stickney (Salem, Oregon)
- Running Horses (1986) by Tom Hardy (Portland, Oregon)
