= Oxon Hill Manor =

Historic house in Maryland, United States

- U.S. National Register of Historic Places
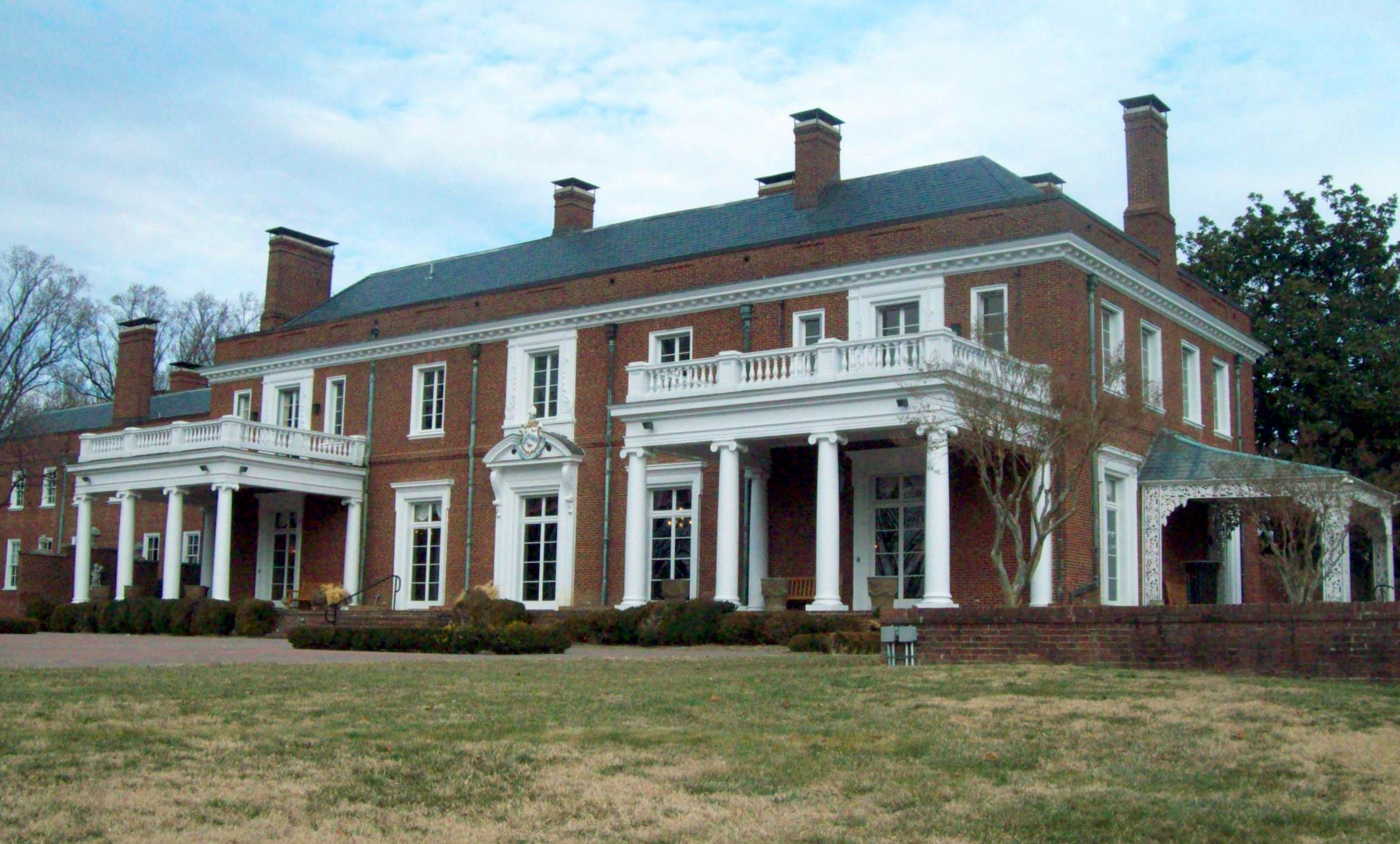
- Oxon Hill Manor, December 2010

- Location within Maryland Location within the United States
- Location: 6707 Oxon Hill Rd., Forest Heights, Maryland
- Coordinates: 38°47′38″N 77°0′21″W
- Area: 55 acres (22 ha)
- Built: 1928
- Architect: de Sibour, Jules-Henri
- Architectural style: Colonial Revival, Neo-Georgian
- NRHP reference No.: 78003117
- Added to NRHP: June 9, 1978

Oxon Hill Manor is a neo-Georgian house of 49 rooms, located at Forest Heights, Prince George's County, Maryland. It was designed in 1928 for Sumner Welles (1892–1961) by the Washington architect, Jules Henri de Sibour (1872–1938). It was built in 1929, and consists of a two-story main block of Flemish bond brick and a northern wing. Also on the property are two outbuildings contemporary with the house; a five-car garage and attached manager's quarters and greenhouse, and a stable. There are also formal gardens on the grounds.

== History ==
The Oxon Hill Manor property has a strong historical association. The colonial-era Addison family, active in the development of Prince George's County and in the colonial government, built a Georgian-style manor house on the property in 1711. In 1778, Thomas Hawkins Hanson, nephew of John Hanson, acquired the property. John Hanson, a president of the Continental Congress and Founding Father, died at Oxon Hill Manor on November 22, 1783, and was buried on the property. Walter Dulaney Addison who was for a time Chaplain of the Senate lived here and conducted a school here.

After a period of ownership by the Berry family, in 1895, the original Oxon Hill Manor burned. In 1927, the property was bought by Sumner Welles, U.S. Undersecretary of State, who built the present manor house. Franklin D. Roosevelt and possibly Sir Winston Churchill were guests there. It was later (purchased in 1952) the home of Fred Maloof, a wealthy oilman, timberland owner, and art collector who established a museum for fine art and John Hanson memorabilia, before in 1976 the 55 acre parcel and the Manor came under the control of the Maryland-National Capital Park and Planning Commission. In 1979, the Commission leased a portion of the property to the Oxon Hill Manor Foundation, a non-profit local community association founded for the purpose of the restoration of the Manor. The lease covered the mansion and about 15 surrounding acres, including the pool and the gardens. Renovation was finished in spring 1982, and public use began in May 1982.

It was listed on the National Register of Historic Places in 1978.

== Gallery ==
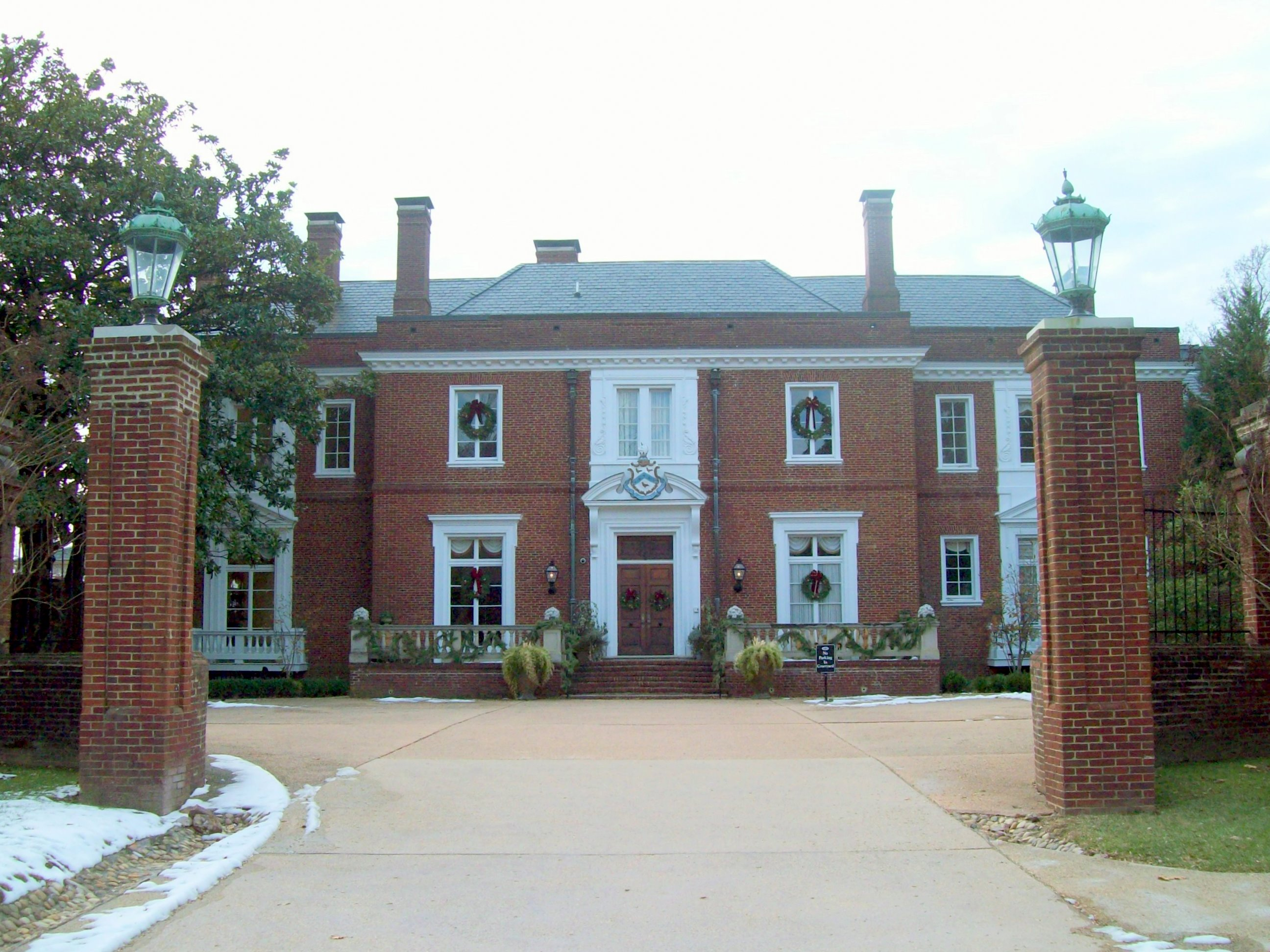
Front Facade, December 2010

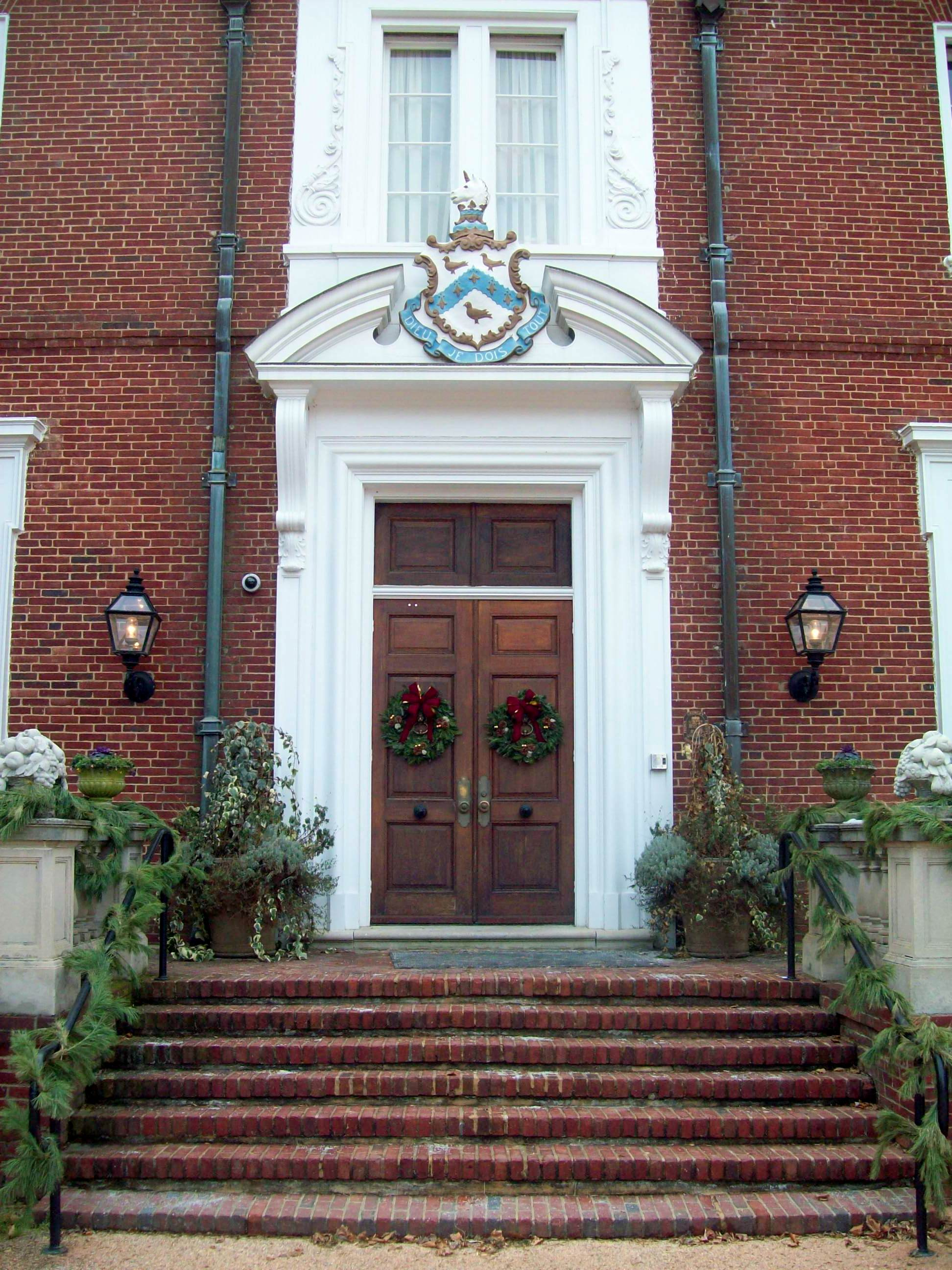
Front Entry Detail, December 2010

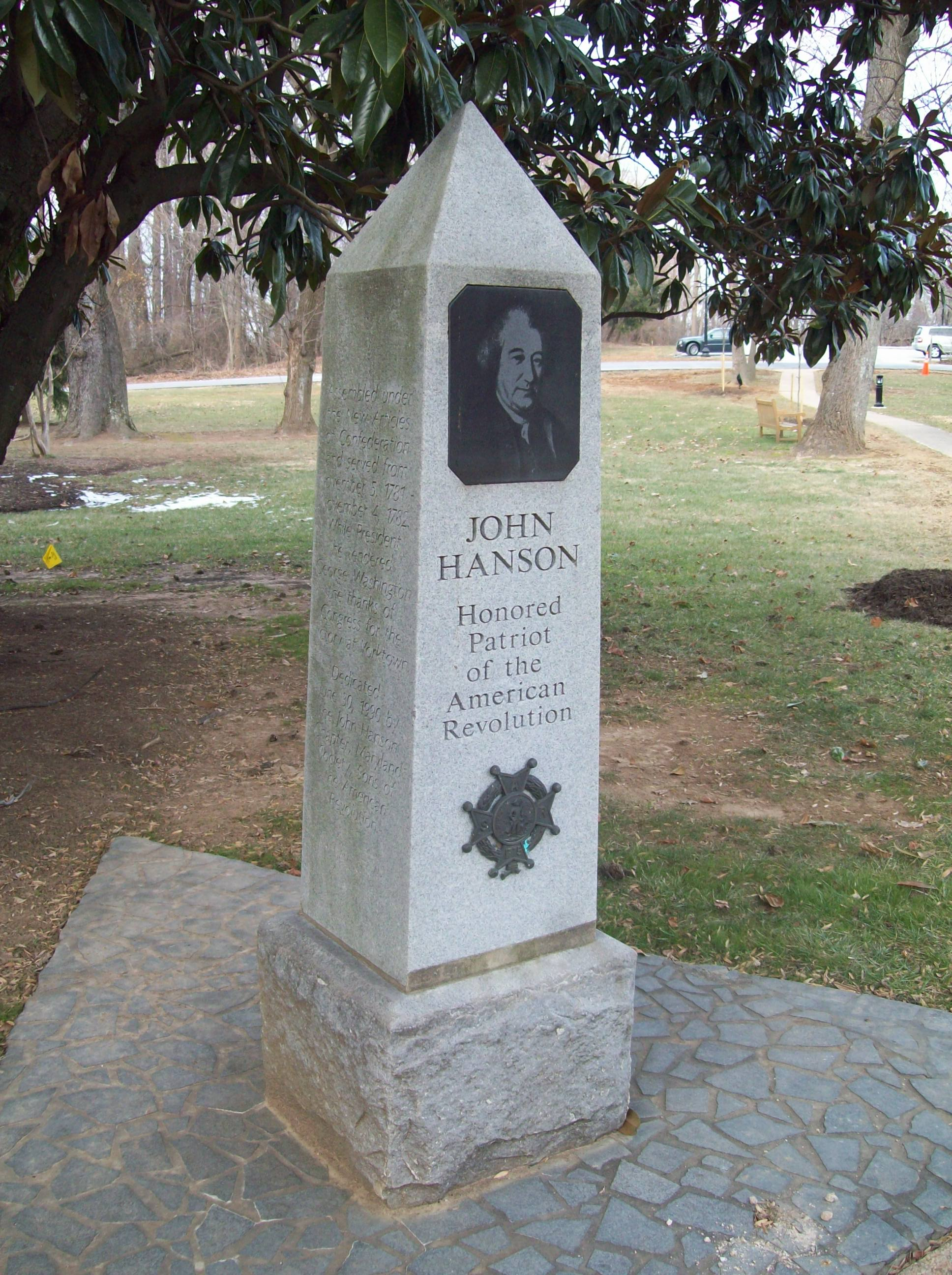
John Hanson Obelisk, December 2010

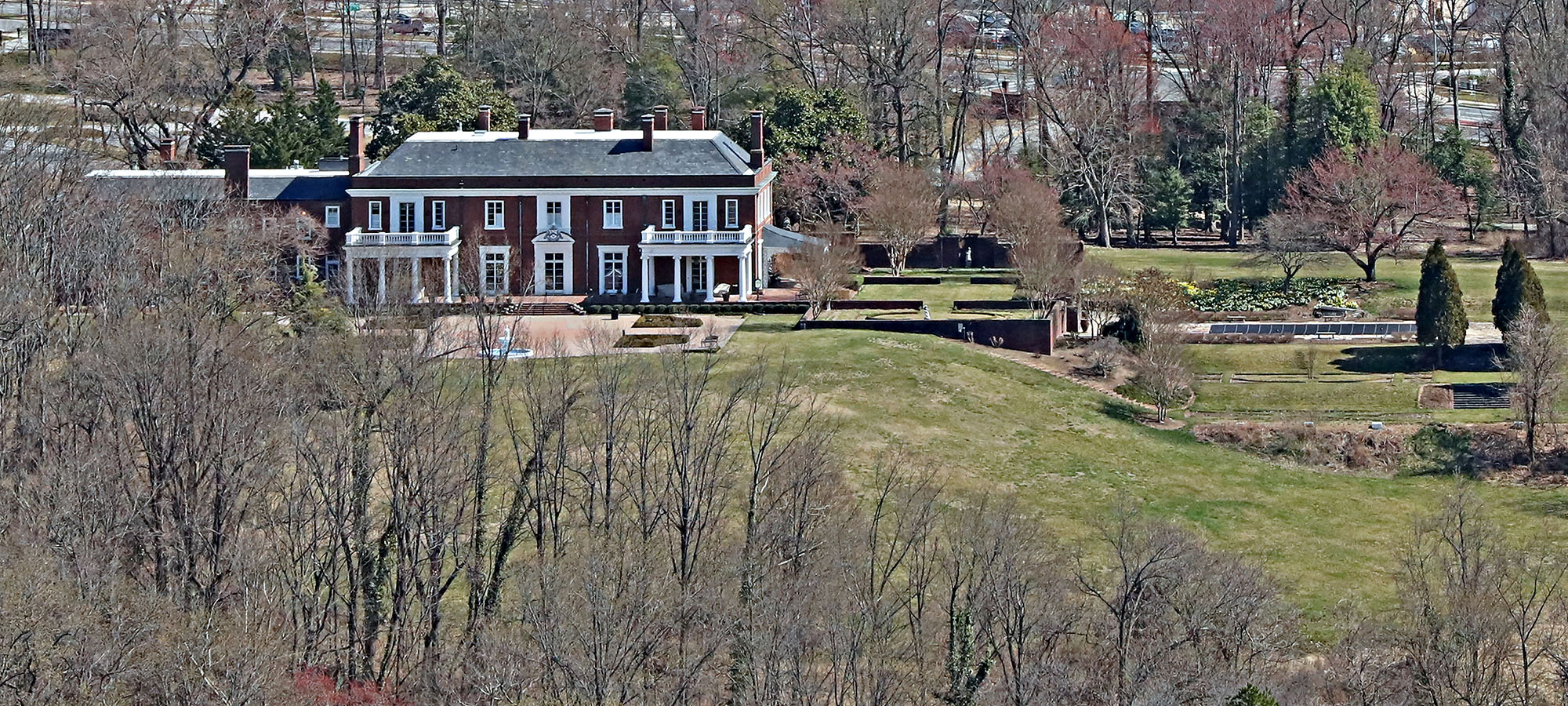
Oxon Hill Manor, Looking East

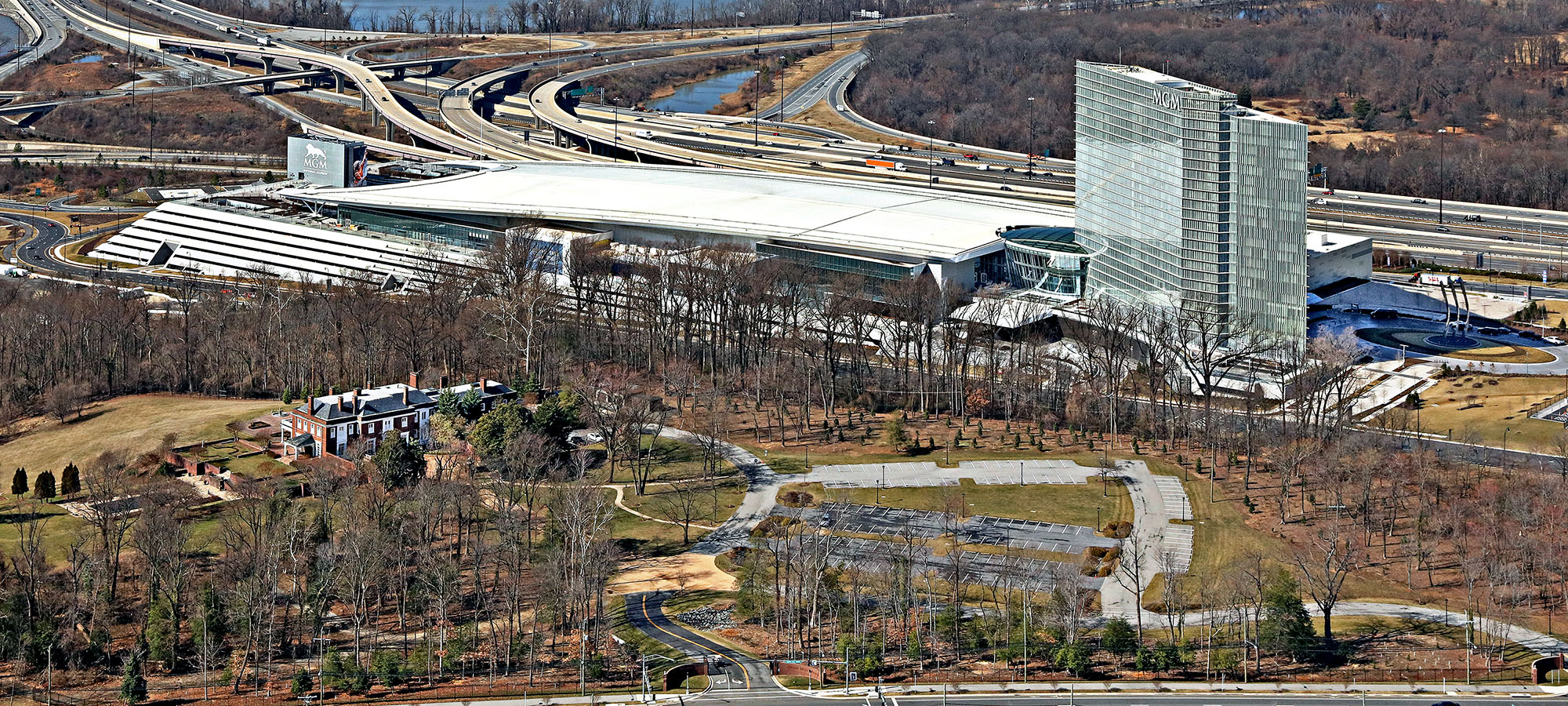
Looking West, Oxon Hill Manor and MGM National Harbor

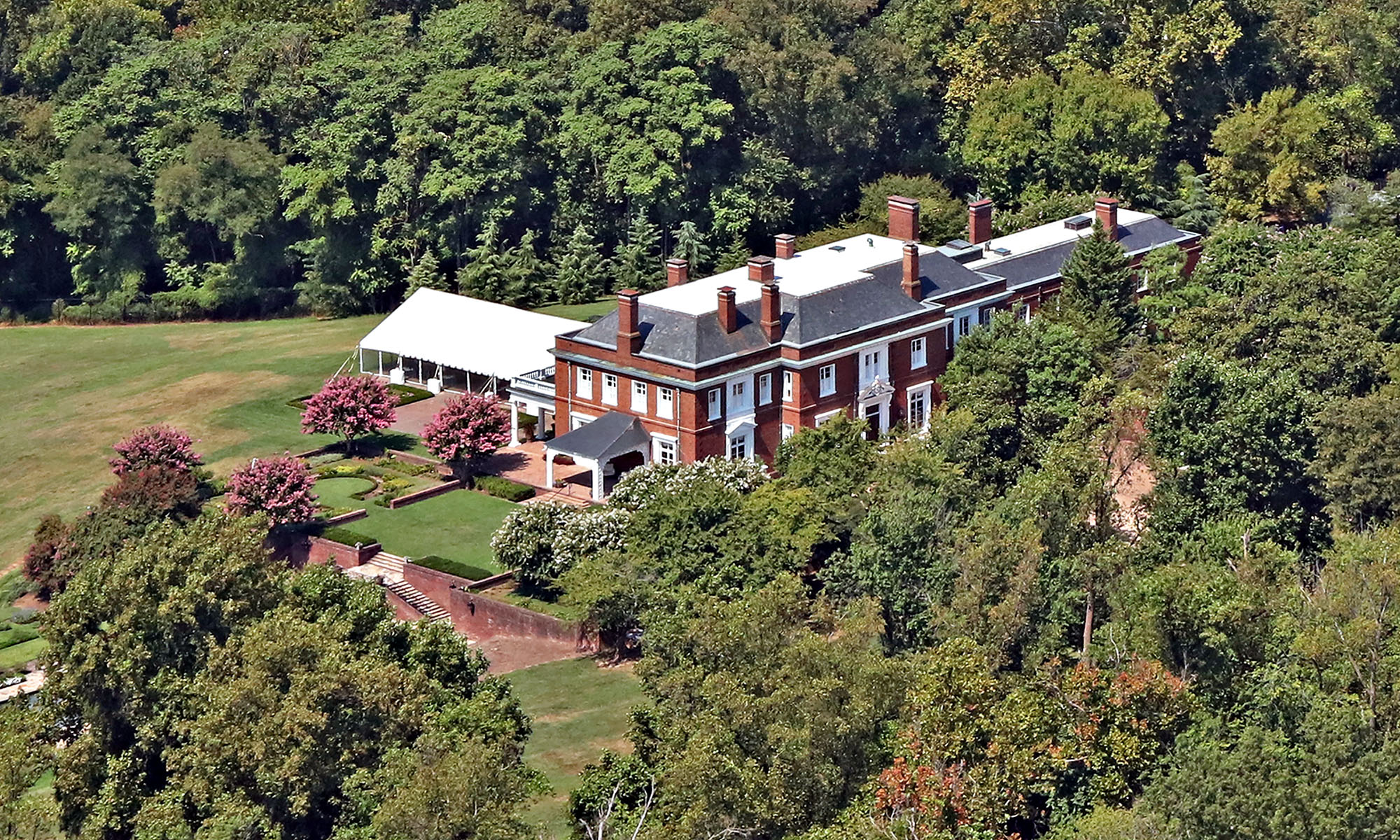
Oxon Hill Manor, Looking Northwest
