= Andrew Mellon Building =

- McCormick Apartments
- U.S. National Register of Historic Places
- U.S. National Historic Landmark
- McCormick Apartments in 2019
- Location: 1785 Massachusetts Avenue, NW, Washington, D.C.
- Coordinates: 38°54′33″N 77°2′30″W
- Built: 1915; 111 years ago
- Architect: Jules Henri de Sibour
- Architectural style: Beaux Arts
- NRHP reference No.: 73002100

Significant dates
- Added to NRHP: April 3, 1973
- Designated NHL: May 11, 1976

McCormick Apartments, also known as Andrew Mellon Building, Mellon Apartment, or 1785 Massachusetts Avenue Northwest, is a landmark apartment building on Embassy Row in Washington, D.C., whose inhabitants once included Andrew W. Mellon. It is the home of the American Enterprise Institute.

== History ==
The Andrew Mellon Building was built by Stanley McCormick, heir to the International Harvester fortune, in 1915 and completed in 1917. Washington-based Jules Henri de Sibour was architect of the building. This was one of the first Washington apartment buildings for luxury living. The structure was meant to fit in with other Beaux-Arts buildings in the Dupont Circle neighborhood. The building's composition is three principal elevations, to serve as a pivot point for a residential boulevard and two street intersections. The six units it originally contained had quarters for more than forty servants. Some of the Capital's most distinguished personalities once lived here. A partial listing of these residents, from the Historic American Buildings Survey, includes:

- Thomas F. Ryan, 1920–1922
- Robert Woods Bliss, 1920–1923
- Edwin T. Meredith, 1921
- Andrew W. Mellon, 1922–1937
- Sumner Welles, 1921–1927
- Alanson B. Houghton, 1930–1934

The millionaire industrialist Andrew Mellon is perhaps most significant of these past occupants. He was Secretary of the Treasury from 1921 to 1932. This was the longest tenure since Albert Gallatin. Mellon made this his residence shortly after taking on that role, occupying the top floor from 1922 until his death in 1937. Among his accomplishments include authoring the "Mellon Plan" which stimulated the economic boom of the 1920s and founding the National Gallery of Art. In 1936 Mellon paid $21 million for paintings and sculptures owned by Sir Joseph Duveen, an art dealer leasing the apartment below. At the time this was the largest art transaction on record.

After 1941, the building was used for offices and eventually partitioned. The property was conveyed by deed from Katherine Dexter McCormick to the American Council on Education on March 31, 1950. Later the property was conveyed to The Brookings Institution on January 2, 1970. Finally, the building was sold to the National Trust for Historic Preservation on October 28, 1976.

The Andrew Mellon Building was declared a National Historic Landmark in 1976.

=== 2013 sale ===
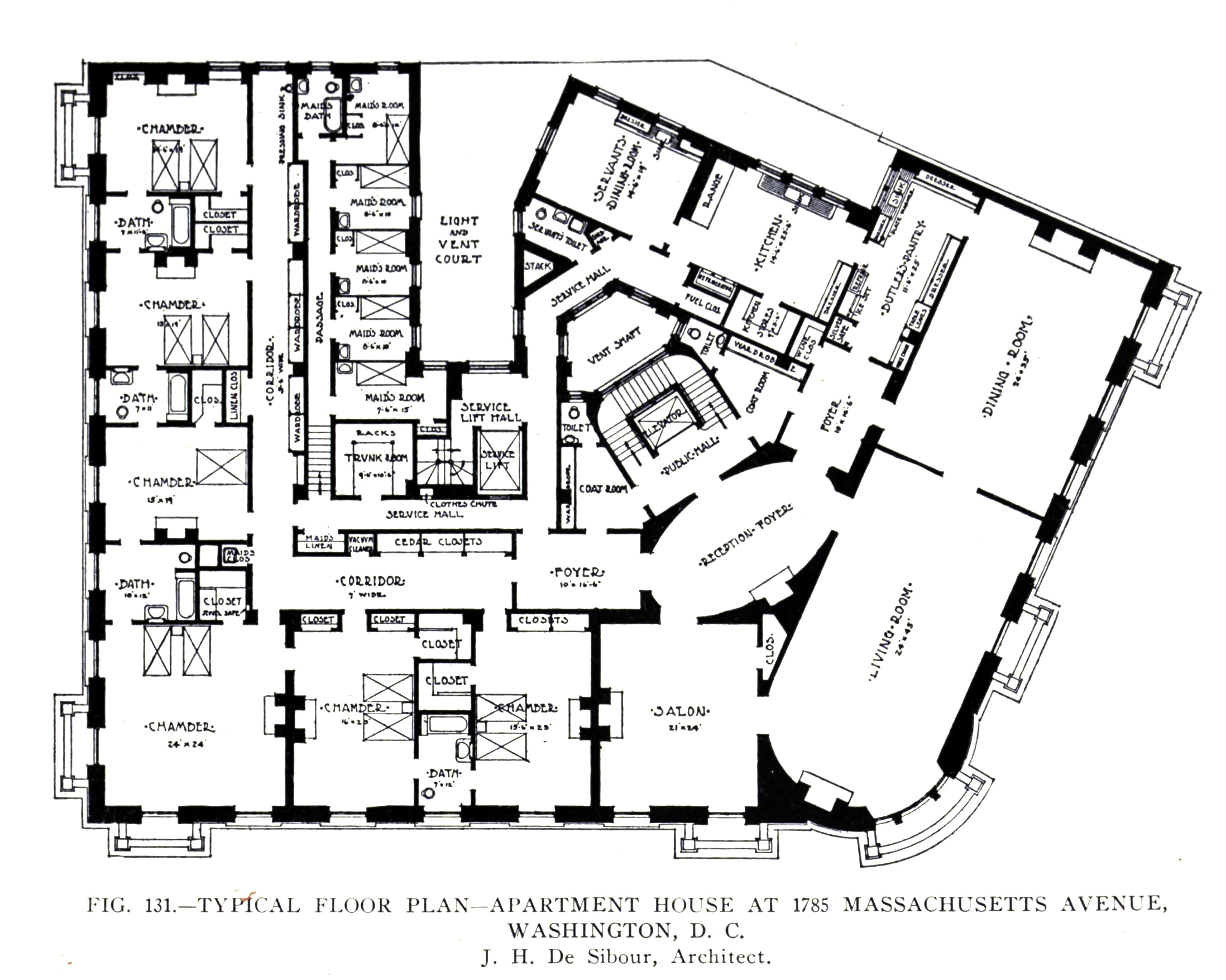
The floor plan

The National Trust put the building up for sale in mid-2009. The organization said it had outgrown the 60,000 square feet (5,600 m^{2}) building and needed about 80,000 square feet (7,400 m^{2}) of space. Real estate experts believed the structure would sell for $1,000 a square foot, or $60 million. Potential buyers considered turning it into a museum or luxury apartments again, but there were no offers at any price. After Trust president Richard Moe stepped down in early 2010 and was replaced by Stephanie Meeks, the organization's board of directors decided to pull the building off the market so that Meeks would not have to devote all her time to finding the National Trust a new home. Instead, National Trust officials said they would rehabilitate some of the structure's windows, HVAC, and mechanical systems and possibly add a green roof.

In late June 2013, the National Trust sold the Mellon Building to the American Enterprise Institute for $36.5 million. The Trust said it will lease space on the top two floors of the Watergate Office Building. The National Trust holds a permanent historic preservation easement that protects both the interior and exterior of the Mellon Building.
