= Jules Henri de Sibour =

French-born American architect

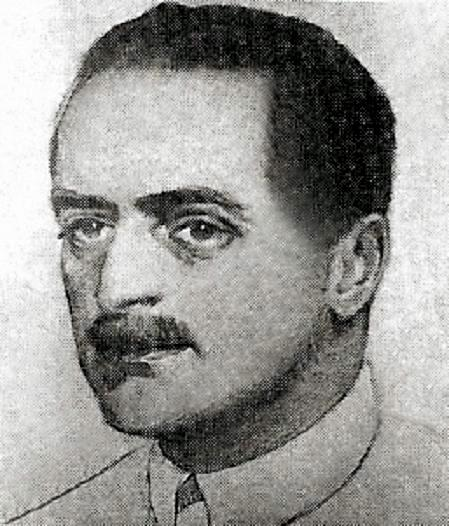
- J.H. de Sibour in the 1910s
- Born: December 23, 1872; Paris, France
- Died: November 4, 1938 (aged 65); Washington, D.C., U.S.
- Occupation: Architect
- Practice: Bruce Price & de Sibour
- Buildings: Clarence Moore House, Washington, D.C.; The Investment Building; McCormick Apartments

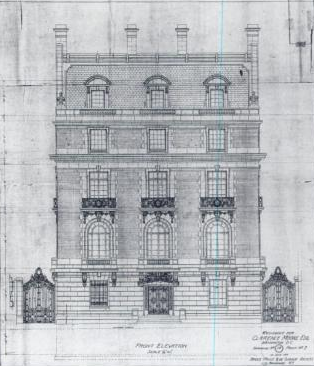
Drawing designs by de Sibour of Clarence Moore House

Jules Gabriel Henri de Sibour (December 23, 1872 – November 4, 1938) was a French architect who worked in Washington, DC.

== Early life ==
He was born in Paris, France, to Vicomte Gabriel de Sibour and Mary Louisa Johnson of Belfast, Maine. He moved to the United States as a child.

He attended St. Paul's School in New Hampshire, then earned a degree from Yale University in 1896, where he was a member of Skull and Bones.

After working in New York for a time, he studied at the École des Beaux-Arts.

== Career ==
After college, de Sibour worked with Ernest Flagg and Bruce Price in New York. He went to Paris for additional education, but after Price died in May 1903, de Sibour inherited the practice and continued work at the renamed firm Bruce Price & de Sibour. From 1908 to 1911, de Sibour maintained offices in both New York and Washington, DC. However, a year after moving to DC in 1910, de Sibour closed his New York office. From 1908 through 1922, de Sibour maintained an office in the Hibbs Building, then moved to the Edmonds Building in 1923.

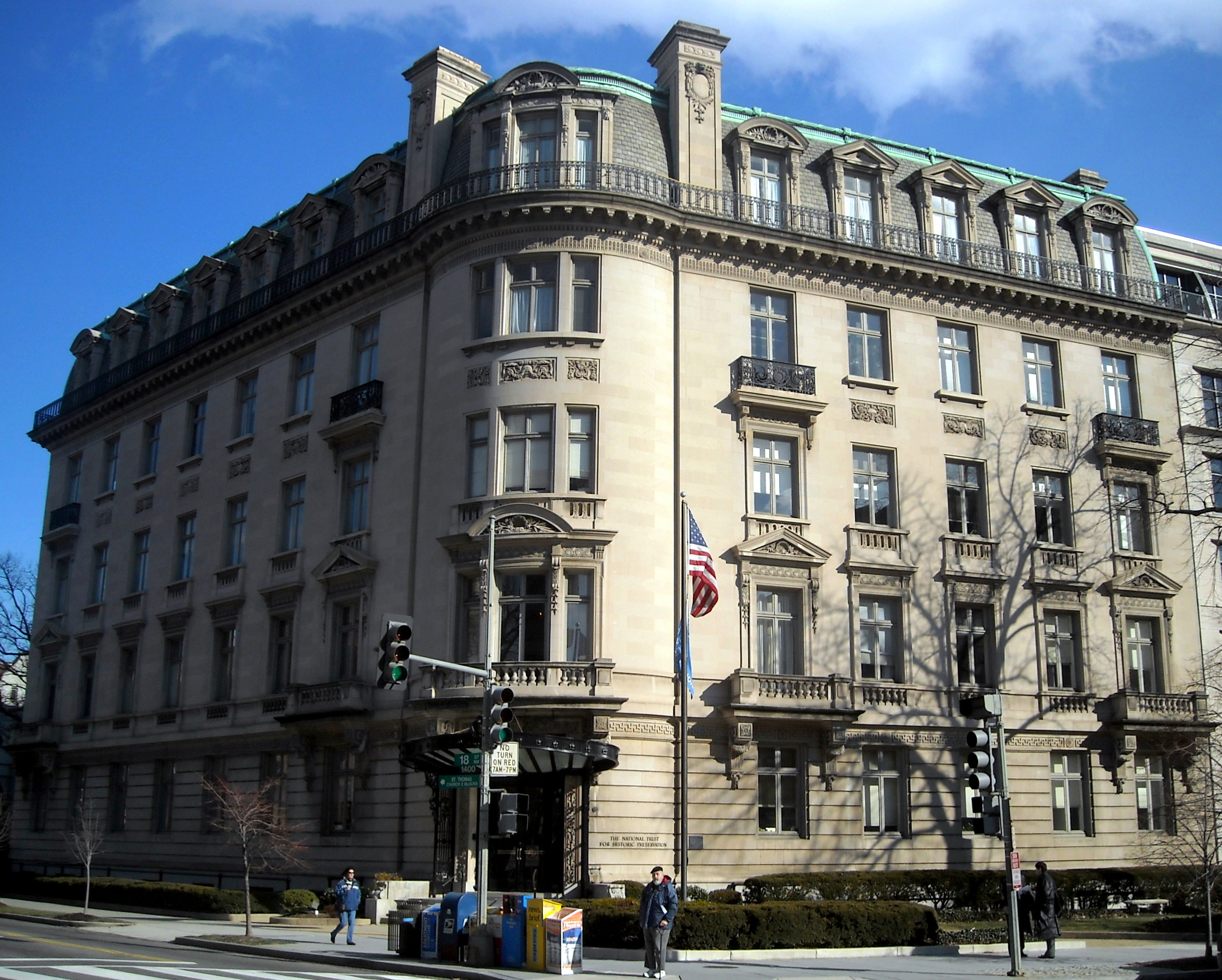
McCormick Apartments building

De Sibour's most prominent works are grand dwellings and embassy buildings, such as the Clarence Moore House at 1746 Massachusetts Avenue, now serving as the Uzbekistan Embassy to the United States. However, he also designed dozens of office buildings, apartment buildings, and a diverse range of structures. In 1910, de Sibour designed The Investment Building, a nine-story bank and office, constructed by J. L. Marshall at 15th Street and K Street NW. The same year he designed the McLachlen Building at 1001 G Street NW and what is now the national headquarters of the National Association of Colored Women's Clubs at 1601 R Street NW for Richard Thomas Mulligan and his wife Emily Ogston Mulligan niece of Secretary of the Navy, George M. Robeson. In 1911, be designed a nine-story office building at 1512 H Street NW and in 1912, a four-story apartment building at 1409 15th Street NW and a five-story apartment building at 1785 Massachusetts Avenue NW. He collaborated with the Boston firm of Desmond and Lord on the Clapp Memorial Building (443 Congress Street, Portland, Maine) opened in 1920. In 1922, de Sibour designed an apartment building, remarkably similar to his design for the 1922 Hamilton Hotel, at 1200 16th Street NW that was later converted to become The Jefferson Hotel. In 1923, J.H. deSibour also designed the Lee House, an eight-story hotel at the northwest corner of 15th Street and L Street NW, for the Kenwood Corporation.

Working in the Beaux-Arts style throughout his career, de Sibour's buildings are characterized by their extensive applied decoration and the French influence in their design. Additional notable buildings include the Chevy Chase Club, the University Club, the Chase's Theater and Riggs Building, W. B. Hibbs and Company Building and the Federal-American National Bank. He designed the French Embassy at 2221 Kalorama Road NW, the Wilkins House at 1700 Massachusetts Avenue NW serving as the Peruvian Chancery, the Stewart Residence serving as the Embassy of Luxembourg at 2200 Massachusetts Avenue NW, and Oxon Hill Manor (1928), an estate for Sumner Welles in Oxon Hill, Maryland.

== Personal life ==
In 1898, de Sibour married Margaret Marie Clagett, daughter of Mr. and Mrs. William H. Clagett, of Washington, DC. Jules and Margaret had three sons: Henri Louis, Jacques Blaise, and Jean Raymond.
