= Gus J. Solomon United States Courthouse =

Historic building in Portland, Oregon, U.S.

- U.S. Courthouse
- U.S. National Register of Historic Places
- Portland Historic Landmark
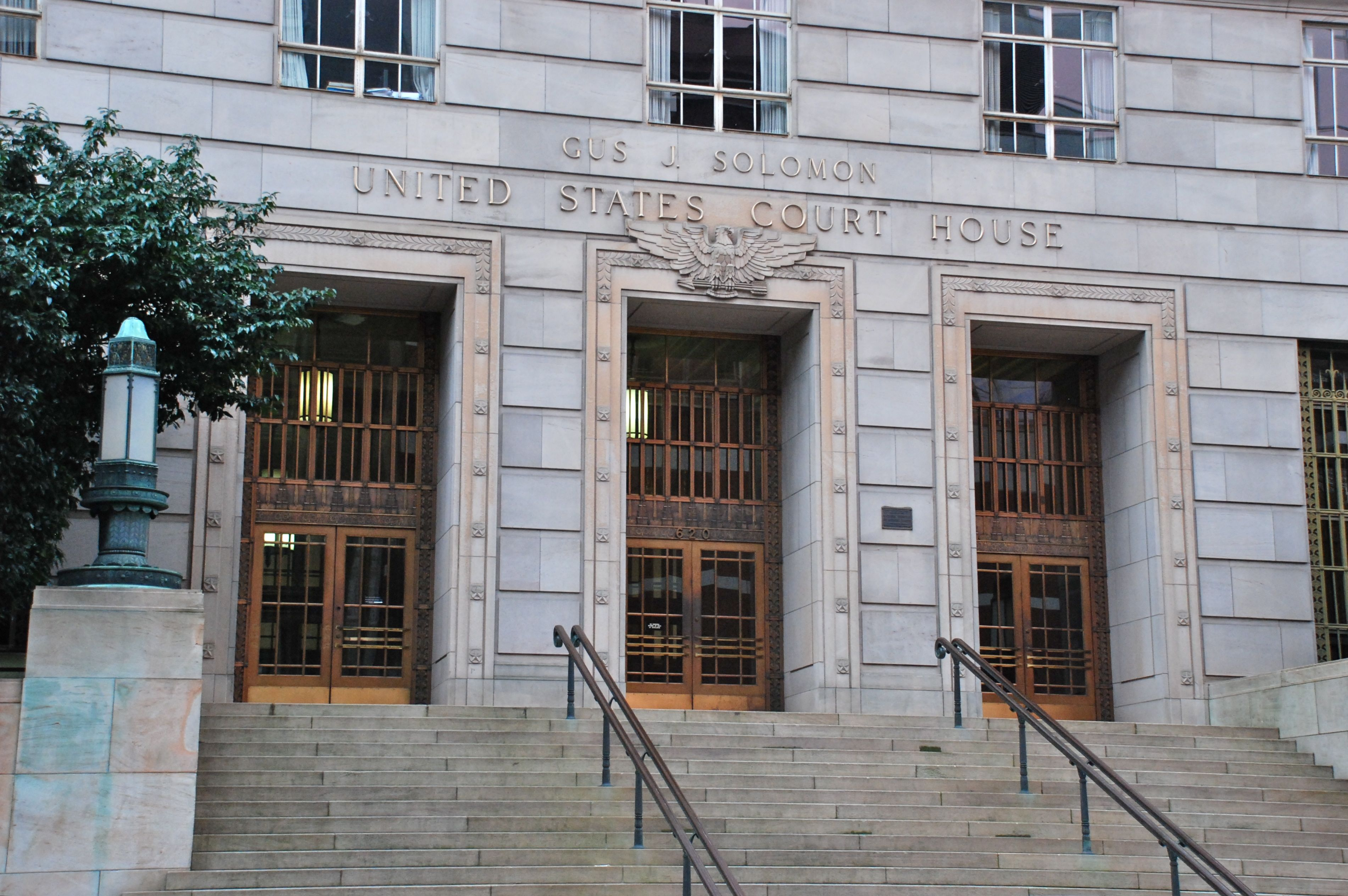
- The building's main entrance, on Main Street

- Location within Portland, Oregon Location within Oregon Location within the United States
- Location: 620 SW Main Street; Portland, Oregon
- Coordinates: 45°30′58″N 122°40′51″W
- Area: 117,000 square feet (10,870 m^{2})
- Built: 1932–1933
- Architect: Morris H. Whitehouse
- Architectural style: Renaissance Revival Art Deco
- NRHP reference No.: 79002142
- Added to NRHP: April 30, 1979

The Gus J. Solomon United States Courthouse is a former federal courthouse located in downtown Portland, Oregon, United States. Completed in 1933, it housed the United States District Court for the District of Oregon until the Mark O. Hatfield United States Courthouse opened in 1997. It also housed a U.S. Postal Service branch until 1984 and again from 2004 to 2011. The Renaissance Revival courthouse currently is used by commercial tenants. In 1979, the building was added to the National Register of Historic Places as U.S. Courthouse. In 1989, it was renamed in honor of Gus J. Solomon, a judge who served the U.S. District Court for 37 years. In 2025, the federal government put the building up for sale and stated that it no longer had any federal tenants. In December 2025, it was sold to a real estate company named SKB.

== Construction ==
The federal courthouse was designed by Portland architect Morris H. Whitehouse between 1929 and 1931, and built by Murch Construction. Construction on the seven-story structure began in 1932, with the laying of the cornerstone occurring in August. The $1.5 million steel-framed with reinforced concrete structure was finished in just over one year. Originally called the Federal Courthouse, it was completed in September 1933. The Solomon Courthouse contains eight courtrooms in its 117,000 square feet (10,870 m^{2}) of space.

Architecturally, the Solomon Courthouse is Renaissance Revival on the exterior and Art Deco on the interior. On the exterior are Doric pilasters that adorn the symmetrical façade, along with classical triglyphs and metopes that alternate in the sandstone frieze. Cornices top the frieze with an egg-and-dart pattern, while a distinct Art Deco floral pattern surrounds the exterior. With an open courtyard in the middle, only the first floor covers the entire block. The building is topped with a flat roof that contains a parapet wall and with decorative gutters.

Materials used on the courthouse include bronze as accents, a light colored gray sandstone on the exterior, marble on the interior along with plaster and oak. Marbles include Pink Kasota Fleuri, Red Nebo Golden Travis, and Brown Nebo Golden Travis used in the entryway. Other details include a bas-relief sculpture honoring Oregon casualties in World War I, a large marble eagle sculpture, and white-marble sculpture called Ventana al Pacifico (1989) created by Manuel Neri.

Two courtrooms located on the sixth floor of the building demonstrate the architectural adornment of the courthouse's interior. These spaces use marble for trim and on the faces of the courtroom clocks, contain leather covered doors, oak cornices, and coffered ceilings. Additionally, these courtrooms contain almost full-length windows, oak shutters, Corinthian columns, and bronze lamps among other details.

== Use ==
After completion, the building housed both the United States District Court for the District of Oregon and the United States Court of Appeals for the Ninth Circuit Portland duty station. The Ninth Circuit moved to the nearby Pioneer Courthouse in 1973, and the District Court left for the new Hatfield Federal Courthouse in 1997. In 1988, the courthouse was renamed in honor of judge Gus J. Solomon after his death in 1987. In 1979, the courthouse was added to the National Register of Historic Places. Until 1984 the building also housed a post office on the first floor and in the basement. It closed as a result of the opening of a new post office named University Station a few blocks away, and the space was then remodeled for use by the District Court. In the mid-1990s the Multnomah County Court explored the possibility of leasing the courthouse from the federal government to use in addition to the Multnomah County Courthouse, but the plans were later canceled.

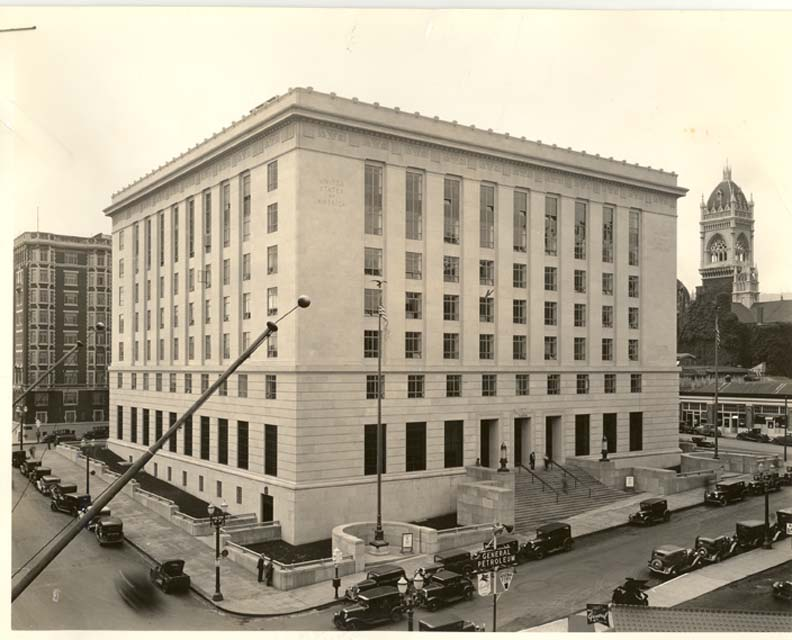
The courthouse in 1933

In 2004, with the remodeling of the Pioneer Courthouse and removal of the post office at that location, a postal branch was re-opened at the Solomon Courthouse, but closed again on January 25, 2011. As of 2004, the courthouse was being used for a variety of tasks, including new citizen swearing-in ceremonies. Other non-court uses have been as a scene for a local play, and as a setting for a courtroom scene in the Hollywood movie The Hunted. Plans in the late 1990s called for the federal bankruptcy court of Oregon to move into the building, along with the Internal Revenue Service after renovations. There were once proposals to use the building as the headquarters for a proposed Twelfth Circuit Court of Appeals to be created from a split of the Ninth Circuit.

In 2025, the federal government put the building up for sale and stated that it no longer had any federal tenants. In December 2025, it was sold to a Portland-based real estate firm named SKB for $1.8 million.

== Building history ==
The oldest sections of Portland are centered west of the Willamette, and the courthouse is located in this area. Commonly referred to as the New Courthouse to distinguish it from nearby Pioneer County Courthouse (1869), the courthouse has housed such government offices as the downtown post office, the U.S. District Court, the U.S. Court of Appeals, and offices for the U.S. Secret Service and branches of the military.

Whitehouse, a native Portland architect, developed the plans for the courthouse from directives formulated by federal agencies, with Jules Henri de Sibour of Washington, D.C., as the consulting architect and James A. Wetmore, the Supervising Architect of the Treasury.

Ninety-two percent of all contract money available for labor and materials went to Portland and Seattle area firms, providing an economic boost to the region. In August 1932, the cornerstone was laid. Included in a metal box within the stone were five Portland daily newspapers, historic documents relating to the building, and a photograph of Whitehouse and the partners of his architectural firm. Construction proceeded smoothly, and a little more than a year later, in September 1933, the new federal courtrooms were officially opened.

The courthouse was listed in the National Register of Historic Places in 1979. In 1989, the building was given its current name to honor Gus J. Solomon, a judge who served the U.S. District Court for 37 years — longer than any other judge in Oregon.

== Architecture ==
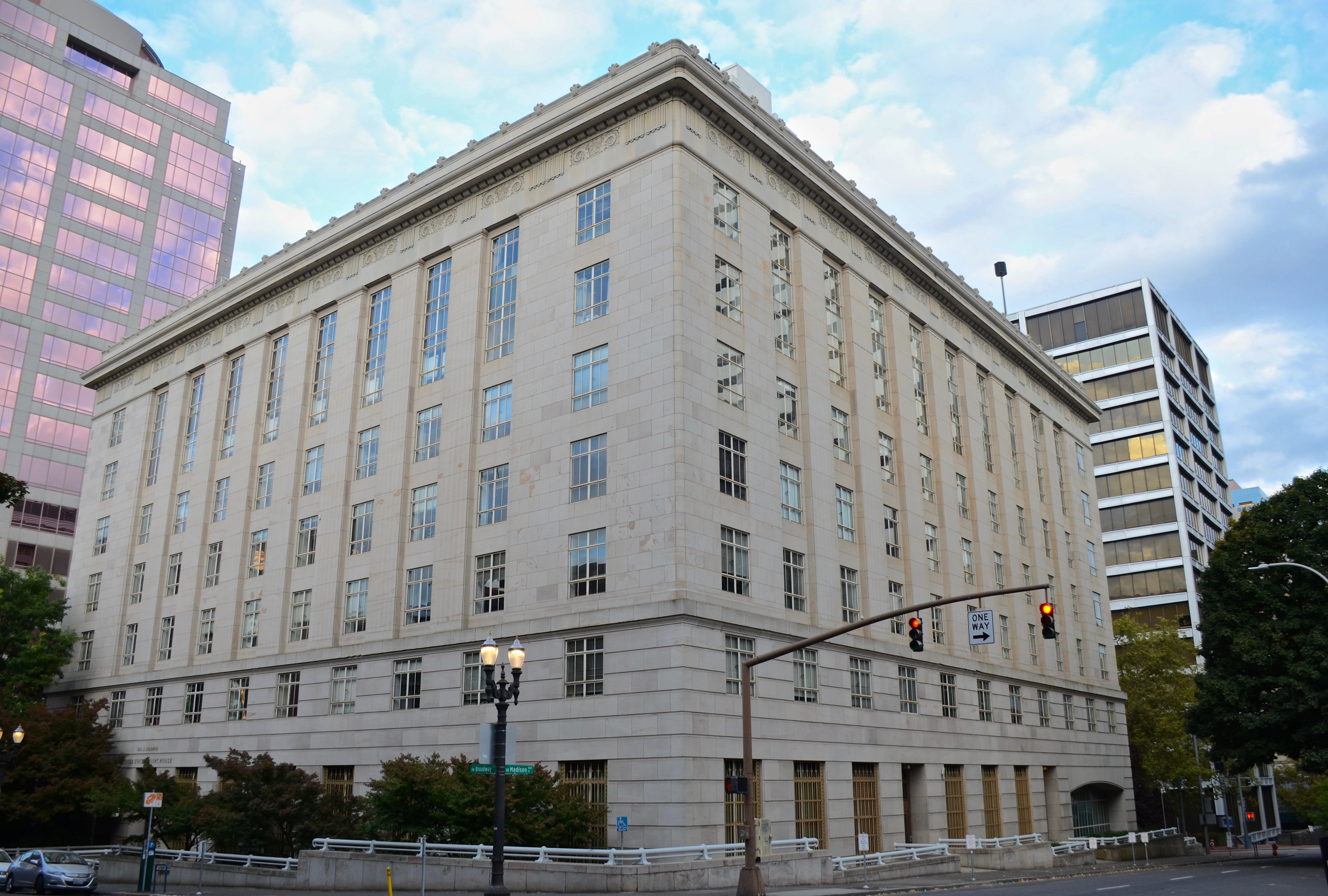
The former courthouse building viewed from Broadway

The Gus J. Solomon U.S. Courthouse occupies an entire block, covering approximately 40,000 square feet. The massive building contains a full first floor only; the central interior space opens into a light court, giving the upper stories of the building a square plan with a hollow center. The exterior of the building is faced with a veneer of light gray Wilkeson sandstone, described as "hard in texture and impervious to water," from Washington State. Characterized in a 1933 Oregonian article as "looming, immense, and impressive," the Courthouse retains its original character.

Designed in the Renaissance Revival style, the building is a study in formalism with touches of Art Deco details. The symmetrical facade is accented with classically inspired details such as the Doric pilasters and the evenly spaced fenestration pattern. Prominent Renaissance Revival details include the rusticated entry level, multi-pane steel casement windows, and the belt course that separates the first level of the building from upper stories. A sandstone frieze with alternating classical triglyphs (groups of three vertical bands) and metopes (interstitial spaces) with Art Deco stylized floral patterns wraps the building. Topping the frieze is an egg-and-dart pattern beneath a moulded cornice. The flat roof features a parapet wall surmounted with scrolled cheneaux (ornamental gutters).

Bronze details are used throughout the Courthouse, most notably on doors, decorative grilles, flagpole bases, and handrails. Principal entrance is gained through the central doorways on the Main Street facade. A repeating star-in-circle motif surrounds the doors, and a garland pattern stretches across the lintel. Surmounting the center door is an Art Deco-inspired eagle with outstretched wings. A modern white marble figurative sculpture by artist Manuel Neri is located east of the main entrance.

Interior public spaces are richly appointed with lavish use of various types of marble. The floor of the foyer is of Brown Nebo Golden Travis marble, veined with natural gold. Surrounding trim is of Pink Kasota Fleuri and Red Nebo Golden Travis marbles. Handsome bas-relief figures memorializing Oregonians who fell in military service in World War I decorate the end walls. The foyer is topped by a plaster cornice and ceiling.

Other impressive interior spaces are the two U.S. District Courts on the sixth story. Brown Nebo Travis Gold marble was used for trim and clock faces. Main doors are covered in leather; walls, cornices, and desks are oak. The decorative coffered ceiling, rosettes, and wall panels are plaster. Nearly full-height windows with oak shutters are located on the exterior walls. The courtrooms feature ornate bronze heating grilles, Corinthian columns and pilasters, and glass and bronze lamps.

== Building facts ==
- Architect: Morris H. Whitehouse
- Construction dates: 1932–1933
- Landmark status: Listed in the National Register of Historic Places
- Location: 620 SW Main Street
- Architectural style: Renaissance Revival
- Primary materials: Steel frames, reinforced concrete, and sandstone veneer
- Prominent feature: Art Deco interior

== Significant events ==
- 1928: Congress allocates $500,000 for the acquisition of a site and $1,500,000 for the construction of the new Federal Courthouse.
- 1929-31: Morris H. Whitehouse, a local Portland architect, designs the U.S. Courthouse.
- 1949: President Truman appoints Gus J. Solomon to the U.S. District Court.
- 1979: The U.S. Courthouse is listed in the National Register of Historic Places.
- 1984: The U.S. Courthouse undergoes extensive renovations, and the U.S. Post Office relocates to another location.
- 1989: The U.S. Courthouse is renamed to honor Judge Gus J. Solomon.
- 2025: Building sold by the federal government
