= Park Blocks (Eugene, Oregon) =

Urban plaza in Eugene, Oregon, U.S.

Coordinates: 44.0507°N 123.0912°W

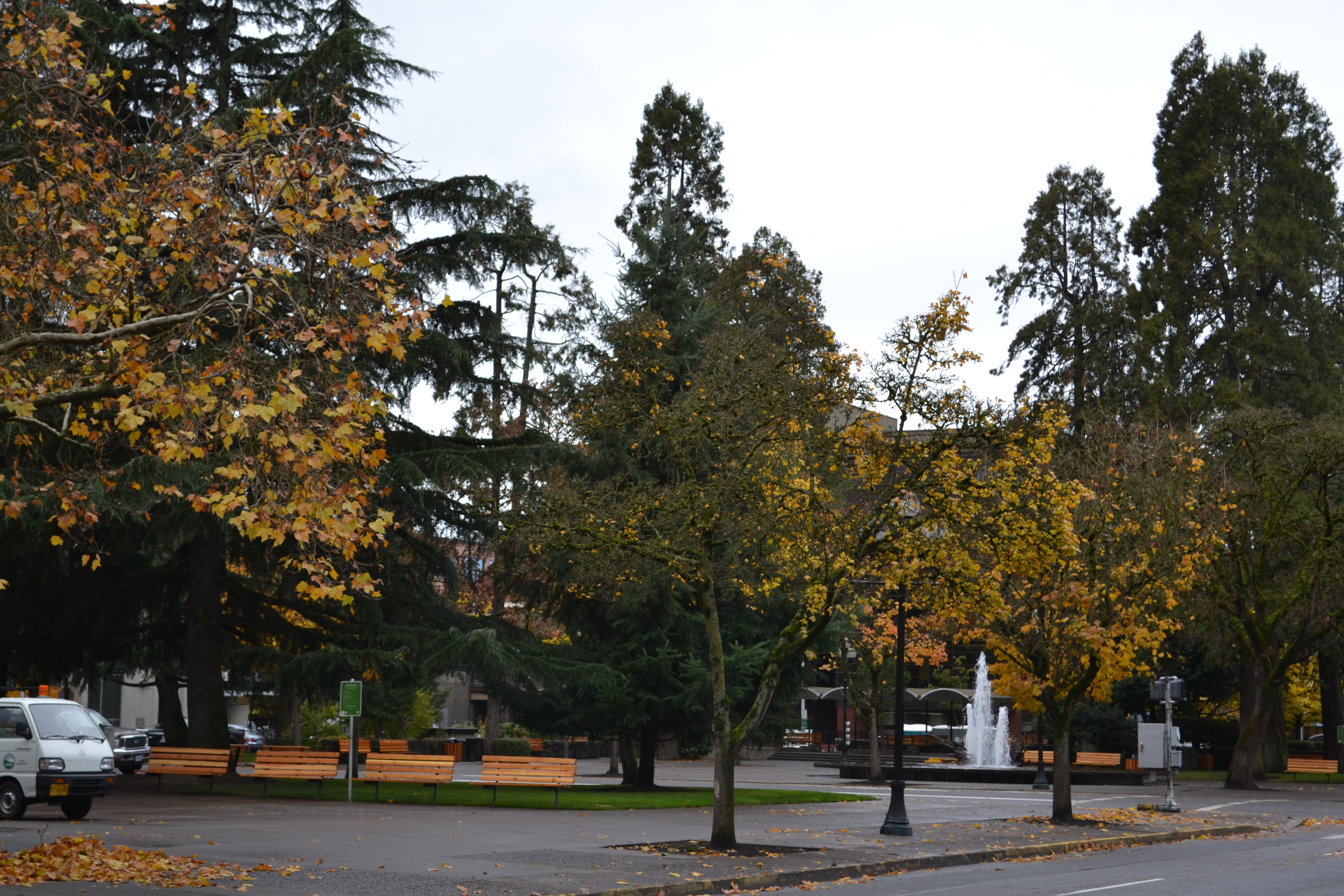
The Park Blocks in November 2011

The Park Blocks, formerly known as Hitching Post Square, are an urban plaza in Eugene, Oregon, United States. Tom Hardy's untitled fountain and sculpture (1952) and Jan Zach's Three Standing Forms (1959) are both installed in the park.
