= Hatfield Fountain =

Fountain and sculpture in Salem, Oregon, U.S.

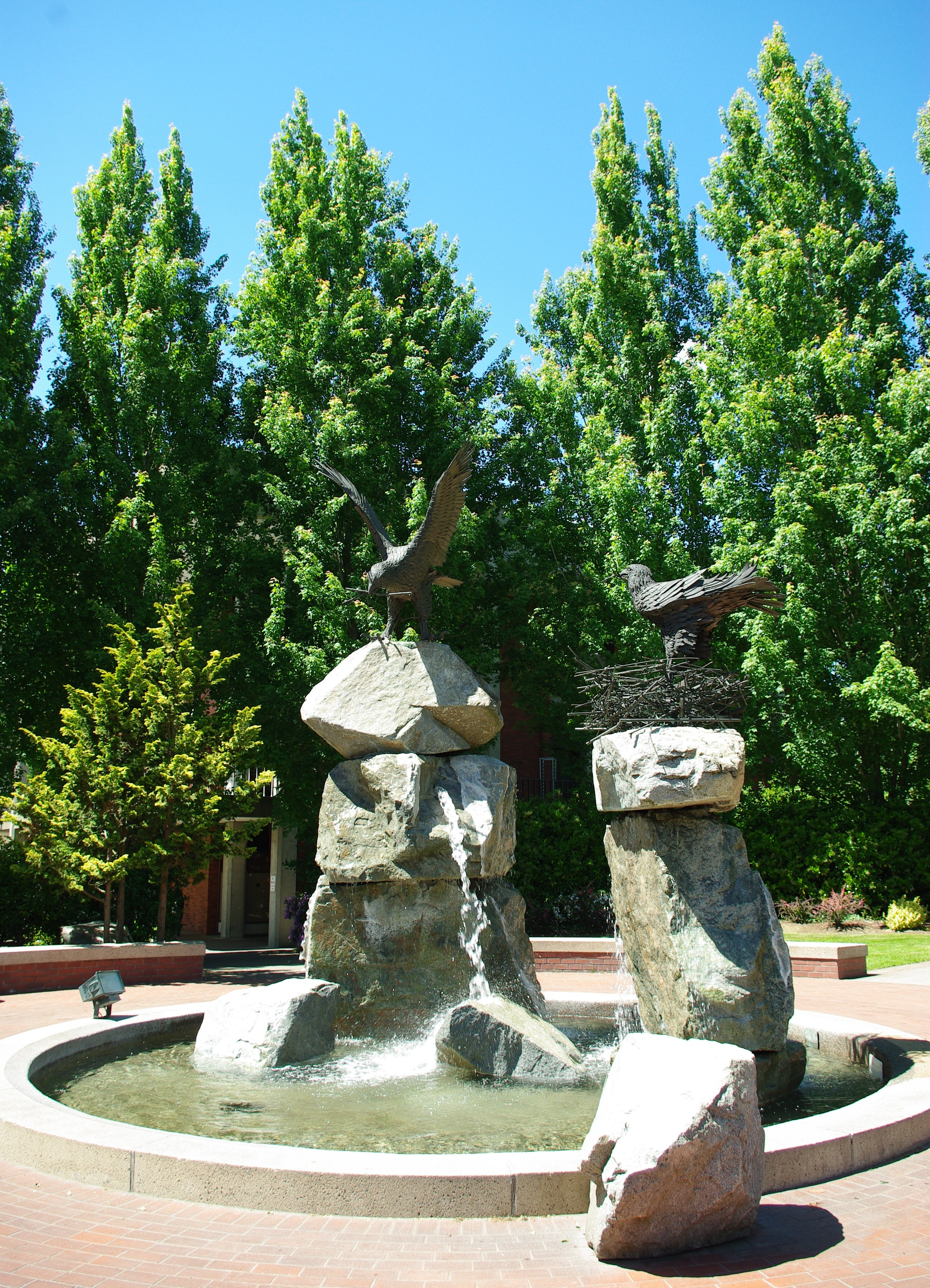
- The fountain in 2008
- Artist: Tom Hardy; Lawrence Halprin; Scott Stickney
- Year: 1989
- Type: Fountain, sculpture
- Medium: Fountain: Concrete, stone Sculpture: Bronze, steel
- Dimensions: 4.0 m (13 ft); 7.0 m diameter (23 ft)
- Condition: "Well maintained" (1993)
- Location: Salem, Oregon, United States; 44.93509°N 123.03127°W
- Owner: Willamette University

Hatfield Fountain, formally the Antoinette and Mark O. Hatfield Fountain and nicknamed "Chicken Fountain", is an outdoor 1989 fountain and sculpture by Tom Hardy, Lawrence Halprin, and Scott Stickney, installed at Willamette University in Salem, Oregon, United States.

== History ==
Hatfield Fountain was designed by Tom Hardy, Lawrence Halprin, and Scott Stickney. It is named after Antoinette and Mark Hatfield, a former Oregon senator and Willamette University alumnus, and was dedicated on October 13, 1989. According to Willamette University, the fountain serves as a popular reference point for campus gatherings.

The Hatfield Fountain is administered by Willamette University. In July 1993, the fountain was surveyed and deemed as "well maintained" by the Smithsonian Institution's "Save Outdoor Sculpture!" program.

== Description ==
The work features two birds set on a fountain consisting of large stones arranged in two stacks, all set in a round basin. The concrete-and-stone fountain measures approximately 13 feet (4.0 m) tall and has a diameter of 23 feet (7.0 m). One bird sits atop each stack; the bird on the shorter stack is set in a bird nest of rods and carrying a twig in its mouth, and the bird on the taller stack has its wings spread. The birds are made of steel rods and cut bronze or steel sheet; one measures approximately 3 feet (0.91 m) x 2 feet (0.61 m) x 3 feet (0.91 m), and another measures approximately 5 feet (1.5 m) x 2 feet (0.61 m) x 3 feet (0.91 m). Water flows from one of the stacks into the basin. A nearby plaque reads: THE ANTOINETTE AND MARK O. HATFIELD / FOUNTAIN / GENEROUS GIFT / OF / CHARLES E. AND DOROTHY L. COOK / SCULPTURE AND DESIGN BY / TOM HARDY, LAWRENCE HALPRIN / AND SCOTT STICKNEY / DEDICATED OCTOBER 13, 1989.

== See also ==
- 1989 in art
- Untitled (Hardy), Eugene, Oregon (1952)
