= Mont Blanc (dessert) =

Chestnut-based dessert

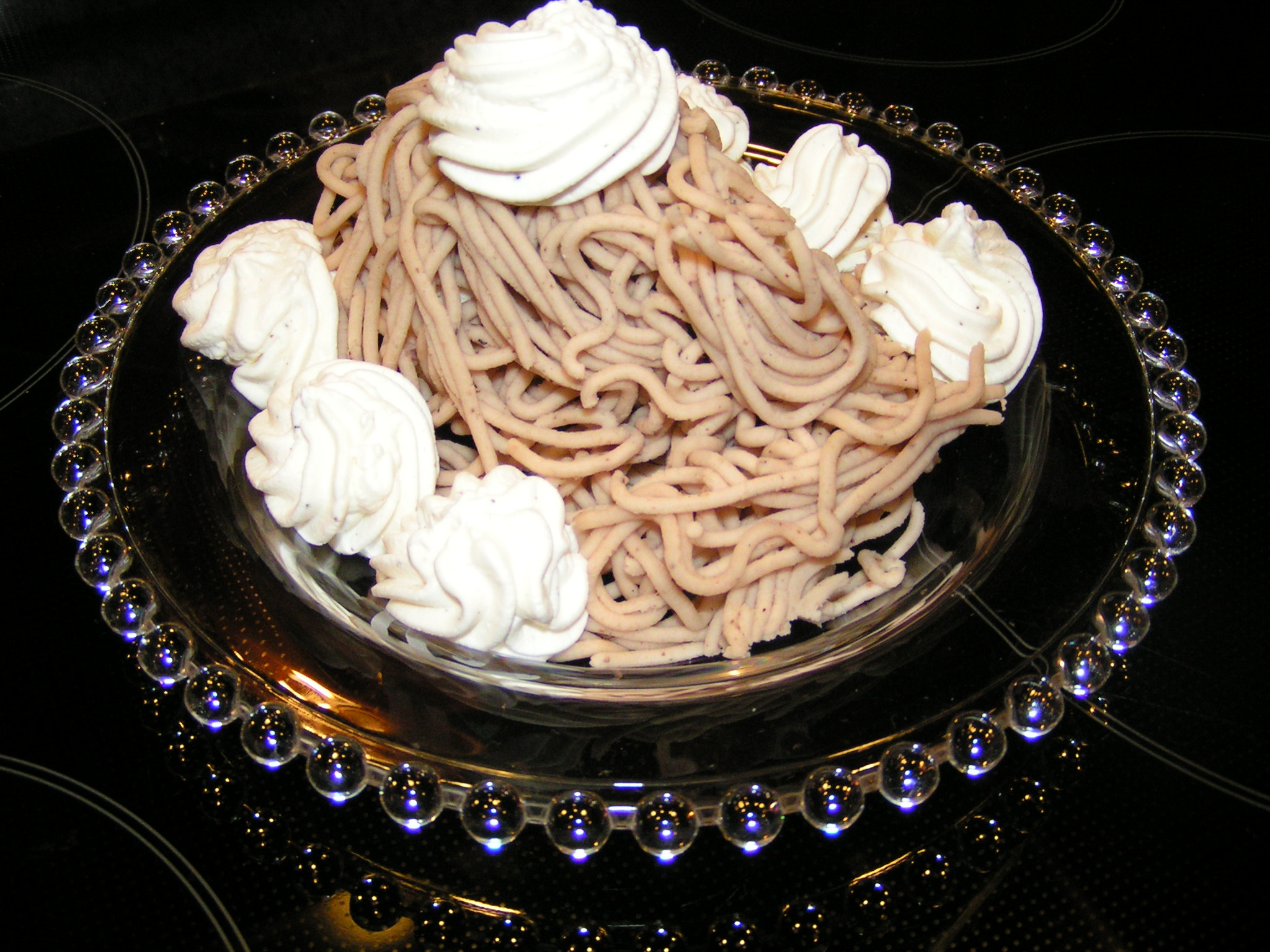
- Mont Blanc
- Type: Dessert
- Place of origin: Paris, France
- Main ingredients: Chestnuts, whipped cream

A Mont Blanc (or Mont-Blanc aux marrons) is a dessert of sweetened chestnut purée in the form of vermicelli, topped with whipped cream. It was created in Paris in the nineteenth-century. The name comes from its resemblance to Mont Blanc.

== Summary ==
Mont Blanc has been an autumn and winter favorite at Parisian pâtisseries, notably the Parisian tea shop Angelina. For a long time considered old-fashioned and heavy, it became popular in the 2010s in a lighter form at trendy shops like Pierre Hermé, with many variations.

== History ==
A dessert with three distinctive characteristics of typical Mont Blanc (sweet, made of chestnut purée in the form of vermicelli served as a mount or a ring, and heaped with whipped cream) existed by the mid-19th century.

=== Chestnut purées ===
Chestnut purées have a long history in Europe as a soup, porridge, or side dish for meats, especially in regions where chestnuts are a staple food. However, these dishes are not desserts, and are not served with whipped cream.

=== Sweet puréed chestnuts ===
Libro de arte coquinaria, a cookbook from c. 1460-1480 authored by Martino da Como, has a recipe for chestnut pie (later called torta di castagne). It is a pastry filled with a blend of chestnut puree, cheeses, fats, eggs, with optional spices and sugar. De honesta voluptate et valetudine a cookbook published by Bartolomeo Platina c. 1475, contains the same recipe under the title torta ex castaneís. A similar recipe appears in Bartolomeo Scappi's cookbook Opera dell'arte del cucinare in 1570, as torta di castagne. Sugar is a standard ingredient in this version. Another similar recipe is titled "chesnut pudding" [sic] in the 1747 English cookbook The Art of Cookery Made Plain and Easy.

Opera dell'arte del cucinare (1570) also contains another dish of chestnuts: minestra di farina di castagne, translated as "thick soup" of chestnut flour, but stiff enough to be sliced and fried. This dish too can be seasoned either savory or sweet.

Some consider the recipes from 1475 and 1570 are Mont-Blanc, but these are not served with whipped cream, and the pie differs from typical Mont-Blanc that it has more ingredients, is covered, and baked.

It is stated that a baker in Chamonix, France, said he invented Mont-Blanc in 1620, or that Mont-Blanc arrived in France from Italy in 1620, but no evidence is given for these.

By the 18th century there was chestnut ice cream. An elaborate form of chestnut-based ice cream is the Nesselrode pudding, which was in vogue in the 19th century.

=== Vermicelli of sweet puréed chestnuts ===
A sweet dessert of puréed chestnuts passed through a sieve to make vermicelli shapes—but without the characteristic whipped cream of the Mont Blanc—is referred to as (compote de) marrons en vermicelle in various French cookbooks starting in 1842.

=== Sweet puréed chestnuts with whipped cream ===
A dish called entremets du Mont-Blanc or simply montblanc, is said to have been invented by the Dessat(s) pastry shop in Paris by 1847. Advertorials describe it as a sweet combination of chestnut purée and snow-like cream, but does not mention whether it had the vermicelli form.

An unambiguous reference to the Mont Blanc as vermicelli of sweet puréed chestnuts with whipped cream is documented in 1863, called nid de marrons (literally: "nest of chestnuts"). Here, the vermicelli are formed into a ring, and whipped cream is mounted in the center.

Recipes of similar dishes appeared by numerous names. However, dishes sharing the same name may differ in forms: vermicelli versus bulk, or the layout.

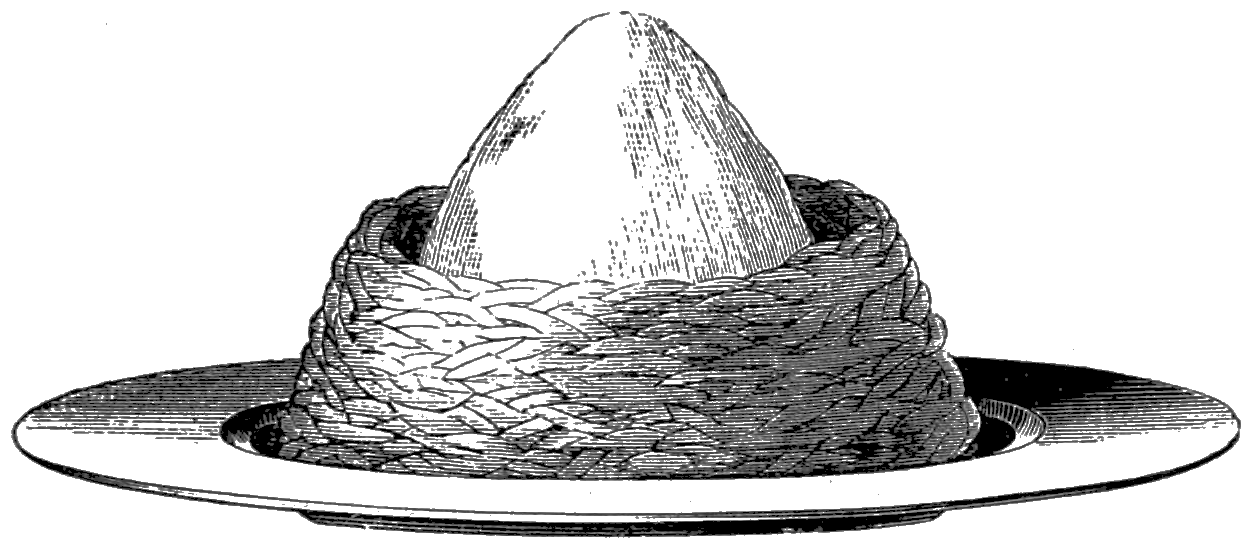
Chestnut purée with cream (1871 cookbook by Urbain Dubois)

Urbain Dubois called the dish chestnut pureé with cream in 1871, and purée de marrons à la crème in 1876. Other names include montblanc (1885), torche aux marrons, which was considered an Alsatian dish (1885, 1892), and marrons chantilly (1889, 1901).

An essay in 1889 recalls the trends on desserts of the past 60 years. It tells that once there was a patissier in Paris who created cakes called monts-blancs, made of chestnut purée and whipped cream; it came into fashion, but the fad soon went away.

Mont Blanc made on a meringue base is described in an 1892 Swiss cookbook La cuisine des familles, as a kind of vacherin cake. The base of vacherins is made of almond paste with egg whites, formed into a cup and baked. Vacherin aux marrons is filled with chestnut vermicelli alternating with whipped cream; another version uses a baked meringue as the base.

Mont-Blanc aux marrons in Escoffier's Guide Culinaire in 1903 is a typical nid de marrons-styled recipe, with the advice to pile the whipped cream up irregularly to imitate a rugged mountain.

Mont Blanc's Italian name "montebianco" as a dessert (not the mountain), is a loan translation from the French term "mont-blanc". The term was in use as early as 1900.

The Swiss German word "Vermicelles" (de), a loanword from French, refers to a dessert of chestnut puree. Terms "Vermicelles" and "Vermicelles mit Schlagrahm" referring to Mont Blanc were in use by the mid-20th century. There are earlier instances of the word from 1868 for some kind of confection, but lack definition.

=== Rumpelmayer and Angelina ===
Angelina, a tea house at 226 rue de Rivoli of Paris, originally named "Rumpelmeyer" ([ʁœ̃pɛlmajɛːʁ]), opened in 1903. Rumpelmayer's salons had already been established in Nice, Cannes, Monte Carlo and Aix-les-Bains, and subsequently in London by 1907.

In 1931, another salon named "Rumpelmayer" opened in Paris at rue du Faubourg Saint-Honoré, by owners different from the rue de Rivoli's. Eventually, the rue de Rivoli shop renamed itself "Angelina" in 1948.

An early record of Mont-Blanc sold by Rumpelmayer can be found in a 1915 magazine article about their London branch.

For the rue de Rivoli branch (the future Angelina), an early record, a magazine review in 1903, does not mention Mont Blanc among their specialties. There are several Japanese accounts praising their Mont-Blanc since the 1920s, and then an English advertisement in 1936. In the 2010s, Angelina said they had been marketing Mont Blanc since 1903, but later reworded it to "recipe was created at the beginning of the 20th century."

Other Rumpelmayers known to have been selling Mont Blancs are the rue du Faubourg Saint-Honoré salon, mentioned in a 1958 travelogue, and the Rumpelmayer's restaurant in New York, on their 1972 menu.

At least by 1980, and as of 2015, Angelina's Mont Blanc consists of whipped cream on meringue base, then covered with layers of vermicelli of chestnut puree, and dusted with powdered sugar.

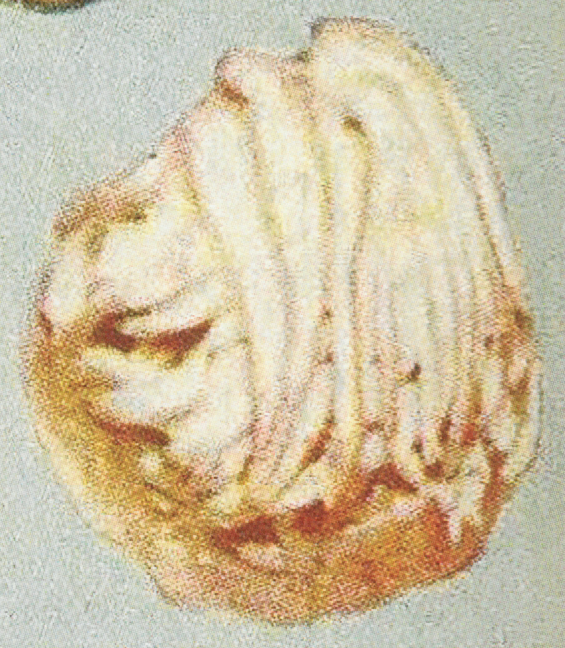
Mont Blanc by Azabu Izumiya (1956)

An identical product was also sold by a confectonery in Japan since 1956, leaving an early photograph of Rumpelmayer-style Mont Blanc. Their chef studied at the Rumpelmayer at rue du Faubourg Saint-Honoré from 1952 and returned to Japan in 1955.

=== History in Japan ===
A typical Japanese-style Mont Blanc in the mid-20th century was a small individual cake, composed of a sponge cake covered with spiraling vermicelli of yellow chestnut puree, and topped with a yellow preserved chestnut.

Records from the 1930s prove that shops were offering similar cakes by 1934, and cakes named Mont Blanc by 1935.

Since the 1990s, the Mont-Blanc (Monburan (ja)), a pastry shop in Jiyūgaoka, Tokyo, claims they invented the Japanese version, and a book citing them states that Mont Blanc was invented by them. An early mention of the shop's Mont Blanc cake is on a 1960 book, but their date of introduction is unclear. Sources written after the 1990s give dates ranging from 1933 to 1945, neither with verifiable evidences.

By the 21st century, the term "Mont Blanc" sometimes applies to cakes topped with any kind of cream formed into vermicelli.

== Preparation ==
Mont Blanc may be made from chestnuts cooked in a light syrup or in milk, or they may be cooked in plain water, and the sugar added afterwards. It may also be made with ready-made canned crème de marrons, a purée of the broken chestnuts left over from the manufacture of marrons glacés.

The chestnut purée is generally formed into a ring or cone, with big dollops of whipped cream dropped irregularly into or onto the middle, to resemble snow. In Italy, garnishes such as candied flowers and crushed candied chestnuts are scattered to further the alpine imagery.

== Variations ==
The chestnut purée may be formed in a mould rather than into vermicelli shapes, though this tends to make the dish heavier.

The original version served multiple diners, but the pâtisserie version today is often an individual serving.

In France, it is sometimes presented on a meringue or biscuit bottom. It may be flavored or garnished with chocolate, rose syrup, berries, and so on.

Variations include using chestnuts in the meringue or biscuit base, with no purée.

Escoffier also describes a Mont-Blanc aux fraises (Mont Blanc with strawberries), essentially whipped cream studded with wild strawberries, with no chestnuts at all, the name referring to its shape.

A simplified version mixes crème de marrons with crème fraîche and serves it in a bowl, with no "mountain".

Traditional patisseries in Shanghai often have chestnut vermicelli cut into short pieces, and laid atop a base of sponge cake, the thickness of which may vary. Shanghainese chestnut Mont Blanc also feature a heavy unwhipped cream topping and may be served in cups. Such style is said to have been created by a German pastry chef at the city's first European patisserie, Kaisiling, and over time it has become a Shanghainese staple under the name "li zi dan gao" or chestnut cake.

In Japan, sometimes pumpkin, squash, and purple yam are used instead of chestnuts, and along with chestnuts, sometimes cocoa or matcha are added. There are also fruit Mont Blanc, with flavors such as mango and strawberry, though they have little in common with the original Mont Blanc besides being made of a purée formed into vermicelli shapes.

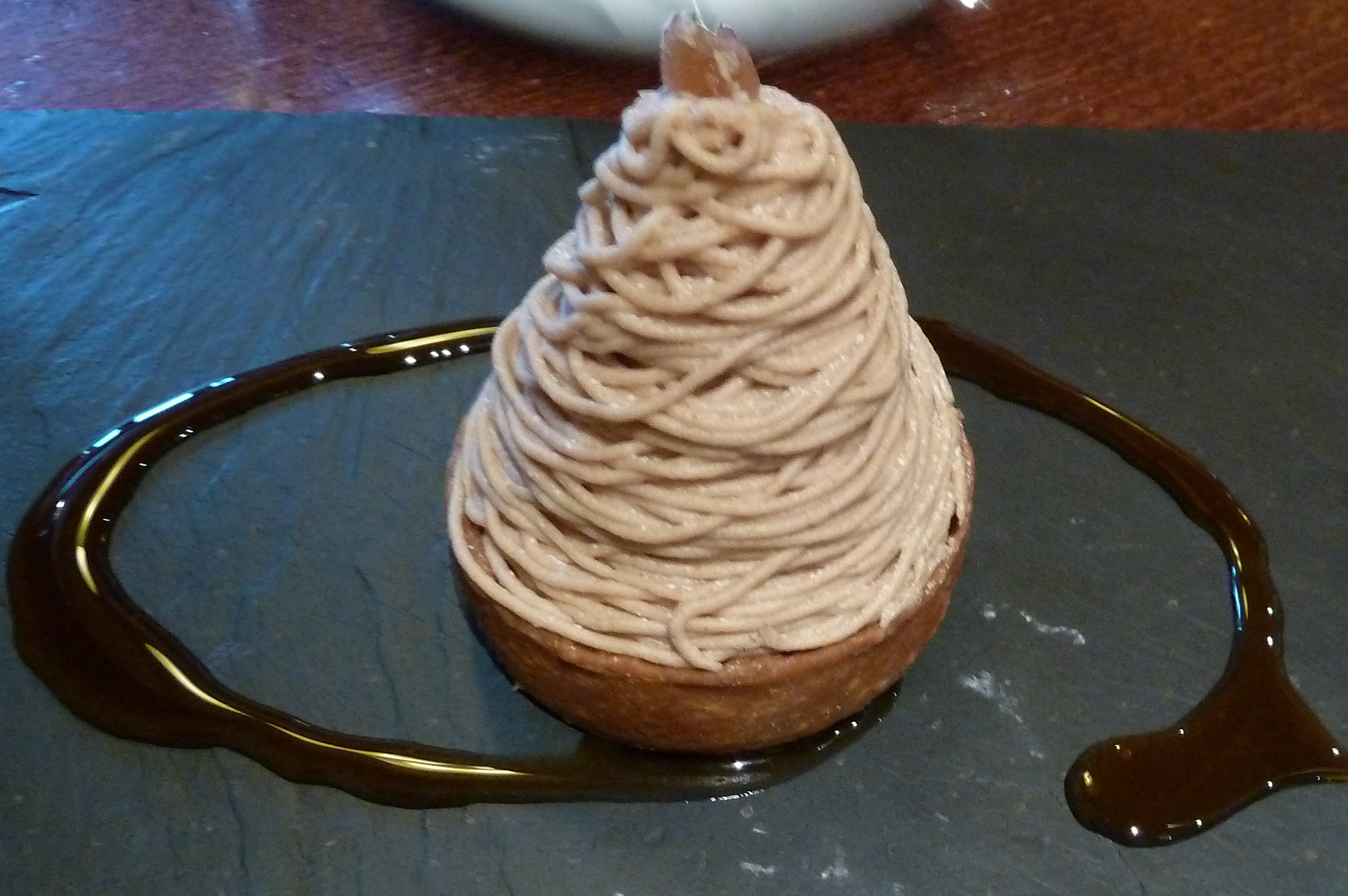
French Mont Blanc with chocolate sauce

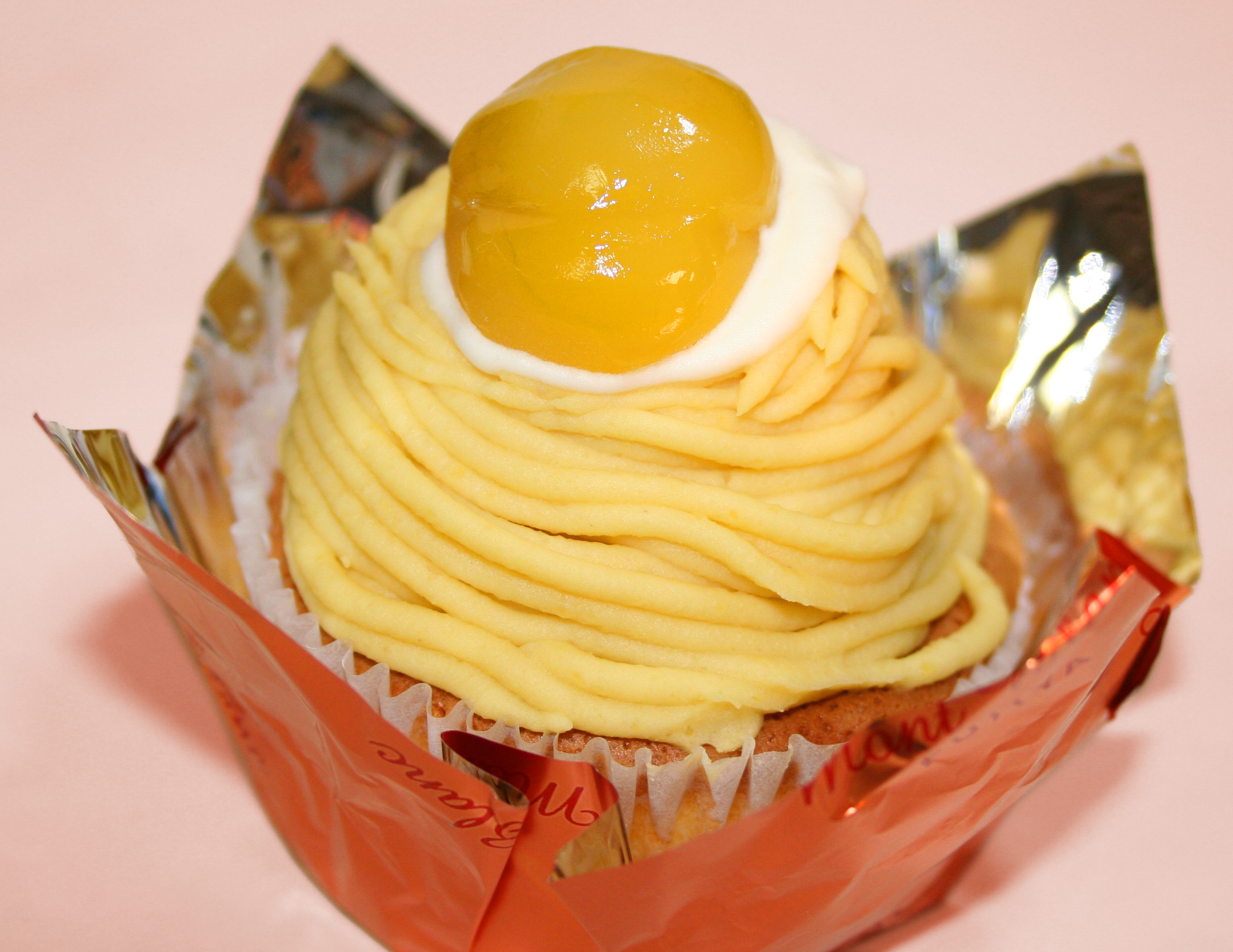
Japanese Mont Blanc atop a small cake

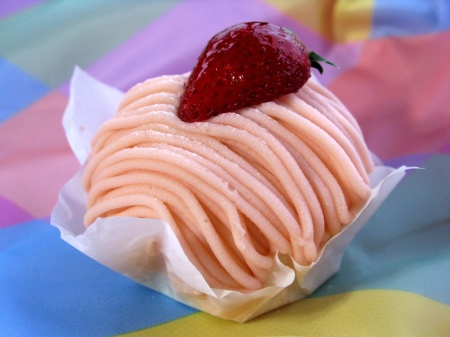
Japanese strawberry Mont Blanc

== See also ==
- Marron glacé
- Mont Blanc (coffee)
- List of desserts
