= Rumpelmayer's (New York City) =

Restaurant in Manhattan, New York

- Interactive map of Rumpelmayer's

Restaurant information
- Established: 1930
- Closed: 1998
- Location: 50 Central Park South, New York, New York, 10019, United States
- Coordinates: 40°45′55″N 73°58′34″W

Rumpelmayer's was a café and ice cream parlor in the Hotel St. Moritz and part of a chain started by Anton Rumpelmayer. It was popular for children's birthday parties, Sunday breakfasts, and afternoon teas. The Art Deco restaurant was designed by Winold Reiss and overlooked Central Park.

The pink walls had Egyptian-style mosaics and the room was decorated with stuffed animals. They served hot fudge sundaes and hot cocoa, which was served in silver pots and considered " benchmark hot cocoa."

Rumplemayer's opened when the St. Moritz opened in 1930 and closed when the hotel closed in April 1998.
