= Hotel St. Moritz =

Hotel in Manhattan, New York

Coordinates: 40°45′55″N 73°58′34″W

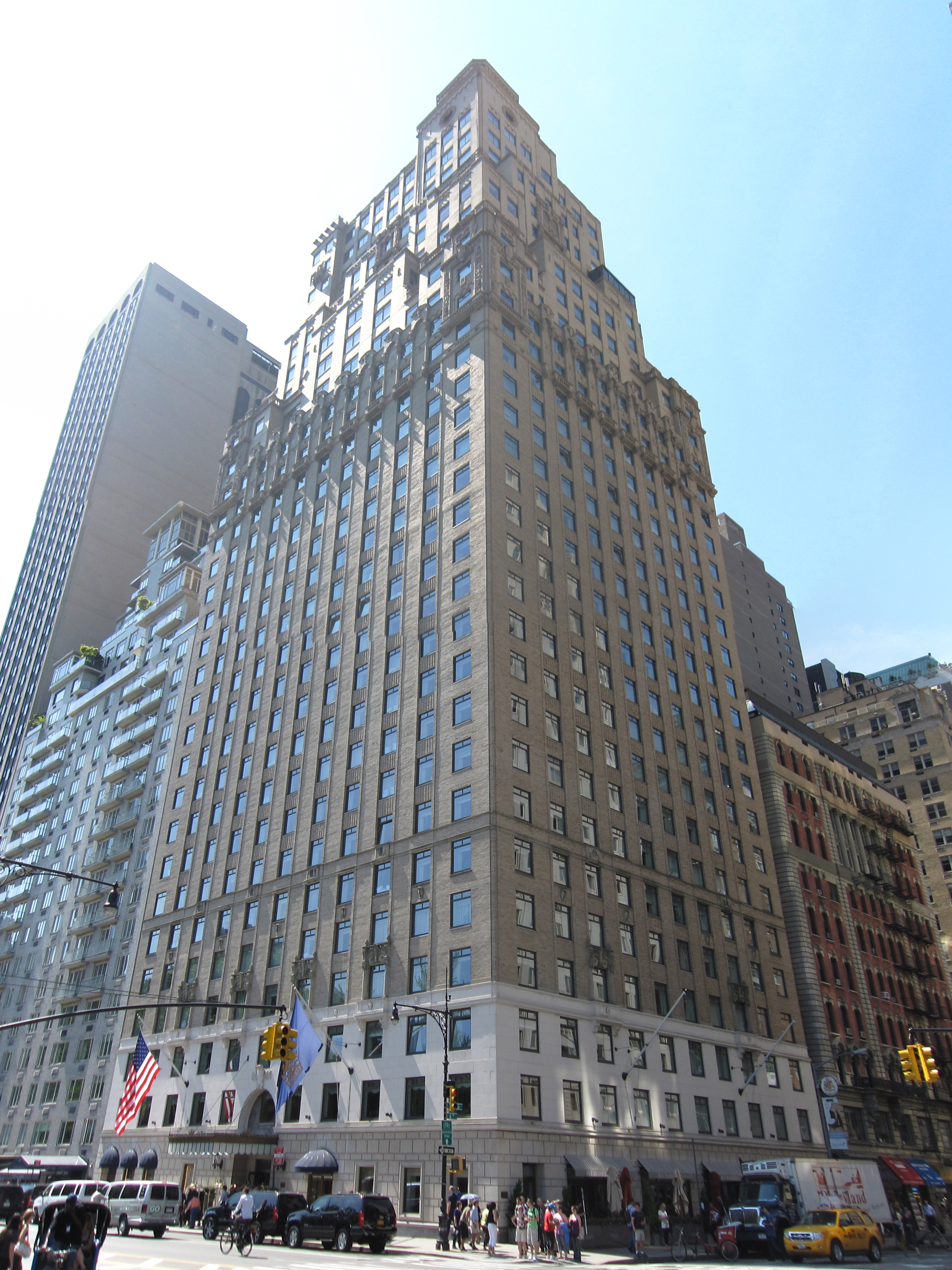
- The former Hotel St. Moritz building, today Ritz-Carlton New York, Central Park, seen in 2010
- Interactive map of the Hotel St. Moritz area

General information
- Location: 50 Central Park South, New York City
- Opening: 1930, 2002 (remodeled)
- Closed: 1999
- Owner: Millennium Partners
- Management: Ritz-Carlton Hotel Company

Technical details
- Floor count: 33

Design and construction
- Architect: Emery Roth

Other information
- Number of rooms: 259

Website
- Official website "Emporis building ID 115274". Emporis. Archived from the original on May 18, 2022.

The Hotel St. Moritz was a luxury hotel located at 50 Central Park South, on the east side of Sixth Avenue, in Midtown Manhattan, New York City. The structure was extensively rebuilt from 1999 to 2002, and today it is a hotel/condominium combination known as The Ritz-Carlton New York, Central Park.

== History ==
The Hotel St. Moritz was built on the site of the old New York Athletic Club. The hotel was designed and built in 1930 by the Hungarian-born architect Emery Roth, and constructed by the Harper Organization, representing Harris Uris and Percy Uris. The estimated cost was about $6 million.

In 1932, the Bowery Savings Bank took over the hotel and then sold it to the Engadine Corporation, led by the Greek-American hotel magnate S. Gregory Taylor (1888–1948). In 1950, the hotel was completely redecorated and redesigned, and, from the following year on, it housed the Café de la Paix, said to be the first sidewalk restaurant in New York City.

In 1985, Donald Trump purchased the 775-room hotel from its then owner, Harry Helmsley, for $72 million. Trump sold the hotel just three years later, in 1988, for $180 million to Australian billionaire Alan Bond Bond had to surrender the property to his lender, F.A.I. Insurance, in 1989, when he was unable to repay their loan. In 1990, the hotel became operated by the Interstate Hotels Corporation from Pittsburgh.

In January 1997, Donald Trump announced an agreement with the hotel's owners, F.A.I. Insurance, to gut the building, which was not a designated landmark and could, therefore, be altered in any way the owners liked, and convert it to a condominium, with the facade covered in glass. The hotel closed on April 20, 1998. However, before any work on the Trump project began, the hotel was sold again just over a week later on April 29, 1998, to hotelier Ian Schrager for $185 million. He reopened the hotel, without any remodeling, as part of his boutique hotel empire. He eventually announced plans for his own renovation of the hotel, but then the hotel was sold again, on November 6, 1999, to a development group, Millennium Partners, headed by Christopher M. Jeffries, which partnered with the Ritz-Carlton Hotel Company to gut and remodel the structure as a combination hotel/condominium. The structure was then completely remodeled as The Ritz-Carlton New York, Central Park, with the lower portion remaining a hotel and the top twelve floors converted to eleven enormous condominiums. It reopened in April 2002.

== Architecture ==
The building has a height of 365 feet (111 m) and has 33 floors. When it operated as the St. Moritz, it had 1,000 rooms that were serviced by six elevators. Close to 400 windows are at Central Park South directly facing the park, in addition to over 300 more windows on 6th Avenue with a partial view of the park. The facade was clad in brown sandstone, with the various towers of the building rising high above the park. In his review from 1931, W. Parker Chase described the hotel as "a picturesque cliff, amidst towering trees to the north, and other soaring skyscrapers to the south."

The aim was to design a cosmopolitan home combining Continental hospitality with American comforts and service. The spacious lobby was luxuriously furnished. On a wall in the lobby, which was of Levanto marble, hung a large painting of the city of St. Moritz by Giovanni Giacometti, a gift to the hotel from the Swiss Alps resort for which it was named. The mayor of St. Moritz, Carl Nater, presented the painting. The various guest rooms, suites, especially the pent house suites with cooling parks breezes and sumptuous furnishings were designed to impress the guests. Both rooms and suites could be rented unfurnished by those wishing to use their own belongings.

A dancing salon and dinner was located on the 31st floor, with Omar Khayyam murals done by David Karfunkle. Laurence Emmons designed the interior.

The original blueprints of the hotel by Roth are located in the Avery Architectural and Fine Arts Library at Columbia University.

== Venues ==
=== Rumpelmayer ===
The hotel had a number of restaurants and cafes. One of them was the Paris-based Austrian caterer Rumpelmayer, who was also Purveyor to the Imperial and Royal Court in Vienna (k.u.k. Hoflieferant), offering lunch and dinners in the tea room, grill and roof garden, where the St. Moritz orchestra entertained with both classic and syncopated music. The cafe was on the side of 59th street, offering views of Central Park. Popular treats at Rumpelmayer's were the coffee and ice creams. The rooms of Rumpelmayer's were designed by the German-born architect Winold Reiss in the art deco style.

Comedian Carol Burnett describes in her book This Time Together: Laughter and Reflection how in the summer of 1959 she spotted Marlene Dietrich at Rumpelmayer's.

== In popular culture ==
In several episodes of I Love Lucy, the Hotel St. Moritz can be seen out of the Ricardos' bedroom window.

During the sixth season of The George Burns and Gracie Allen Show, George and Gracie (along with their neighbors Harry and Blanche Morton and announcer Harry von Zell) stay at the St. Moritz. The Burns stay in Suite 2216.

Liza Minnelli references Rumplemayers in her song "Exactly Like Me", written by Kander & Ebb on her live album during her Tony Award winning concert run at the Winter Garden in 1974.

Unhinged magician Corky Withers, played by Anthony Hopkins, stays in the hotel during the first act of Richard Attenborough's Magic (1978).

In the HBO Film 61*, it's the in-season home of Mickey Mantle.

The building appeared in the 2008 video game Grand Theft Auto IV. It was also used in a mission of the game.

== Gallery ==
Hotel St. Moritz

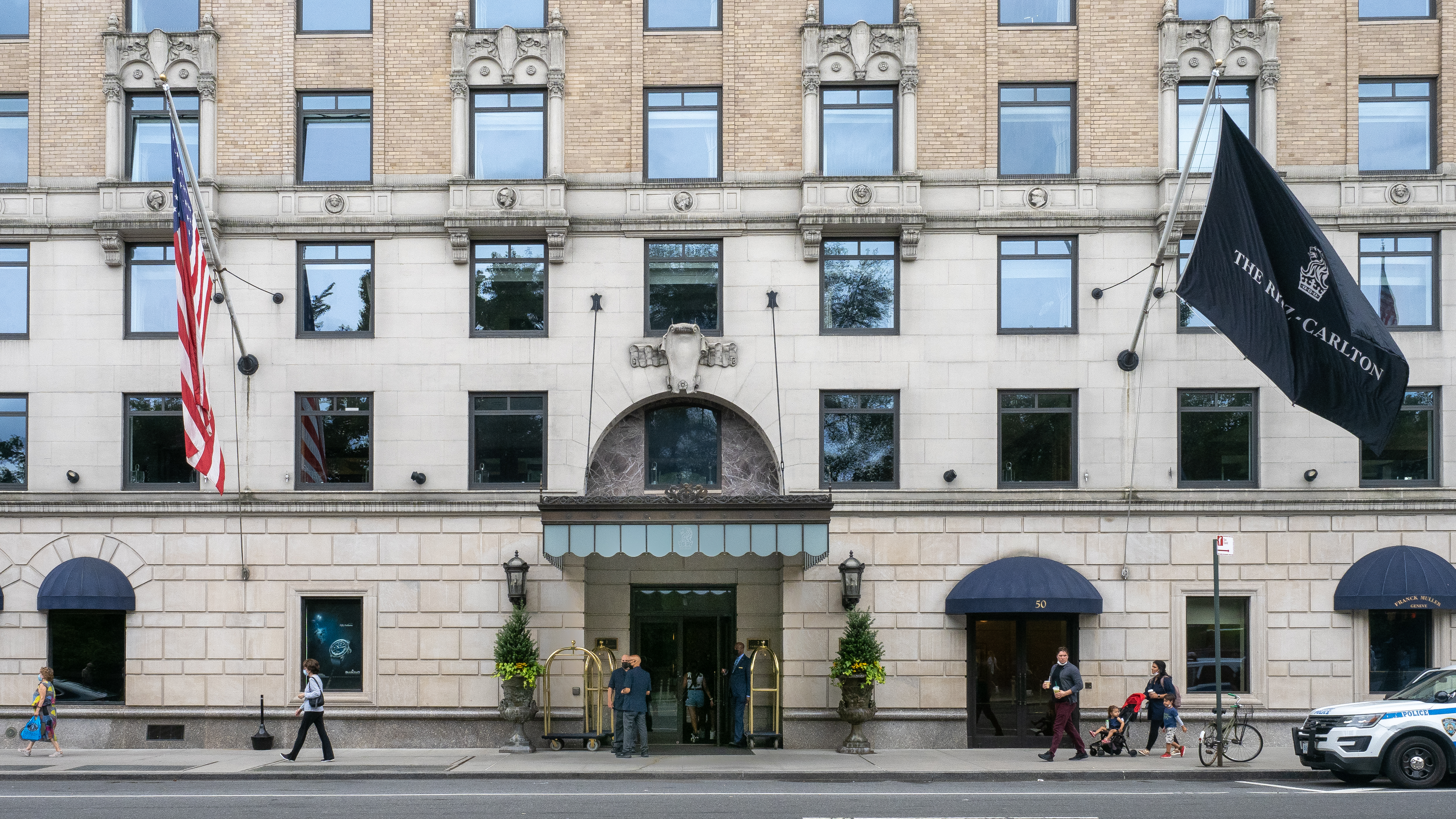
Entrance to the Hotel

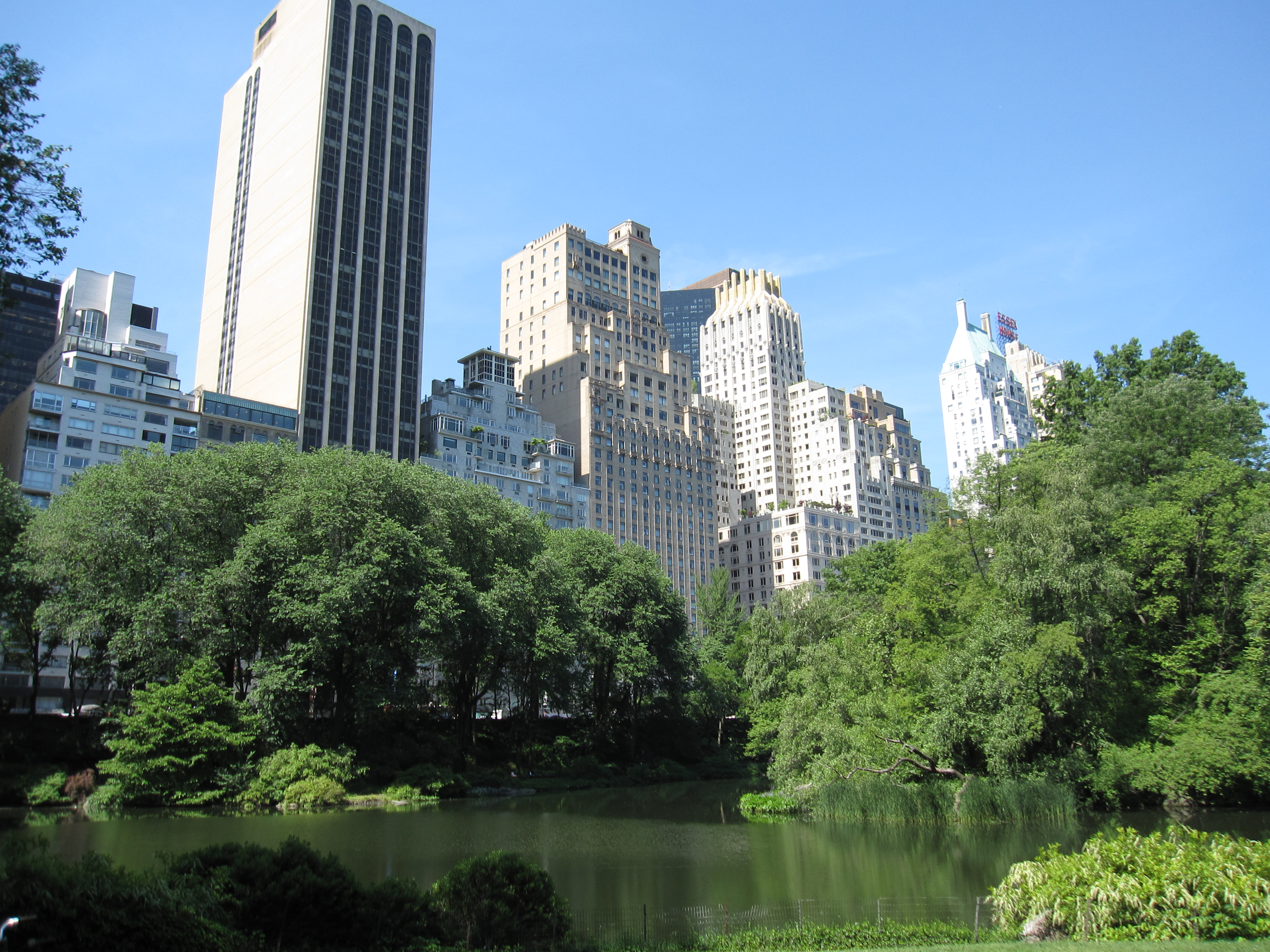
The hotel as seen from Central Park overlooking the Pond

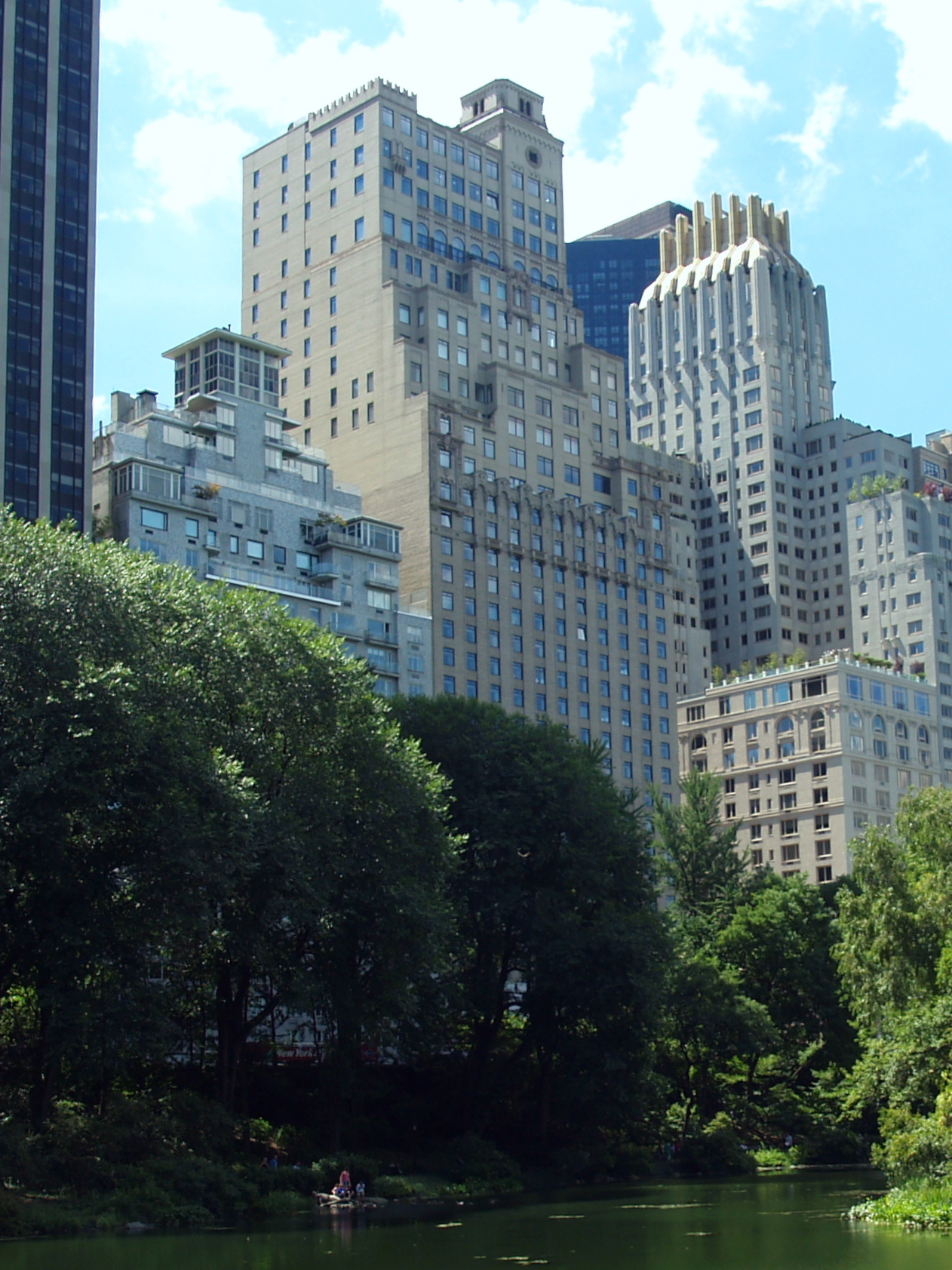
Closeup of the hotel as seen from Central Park

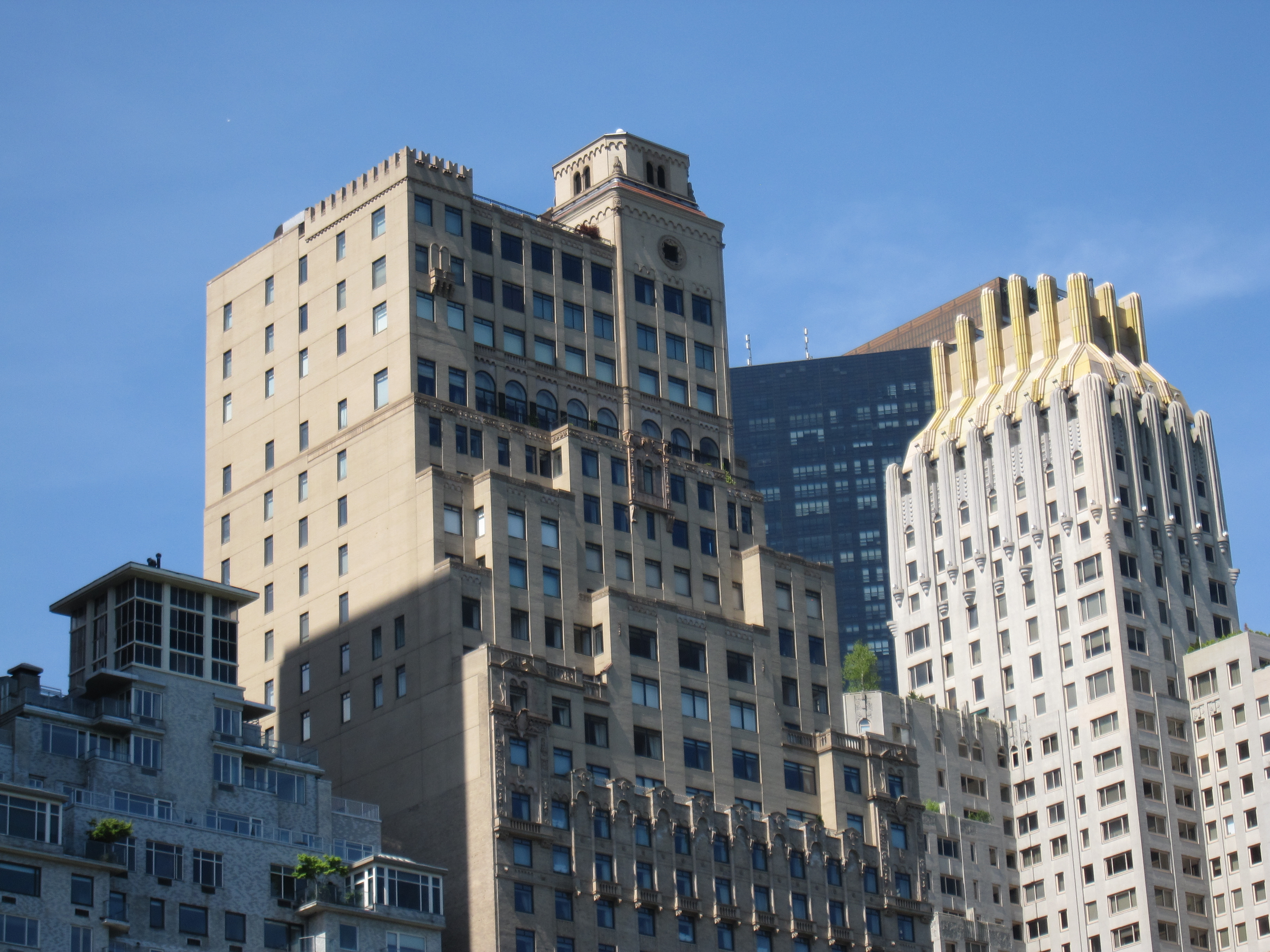
Closeup of the upper condominium portion of the hotel

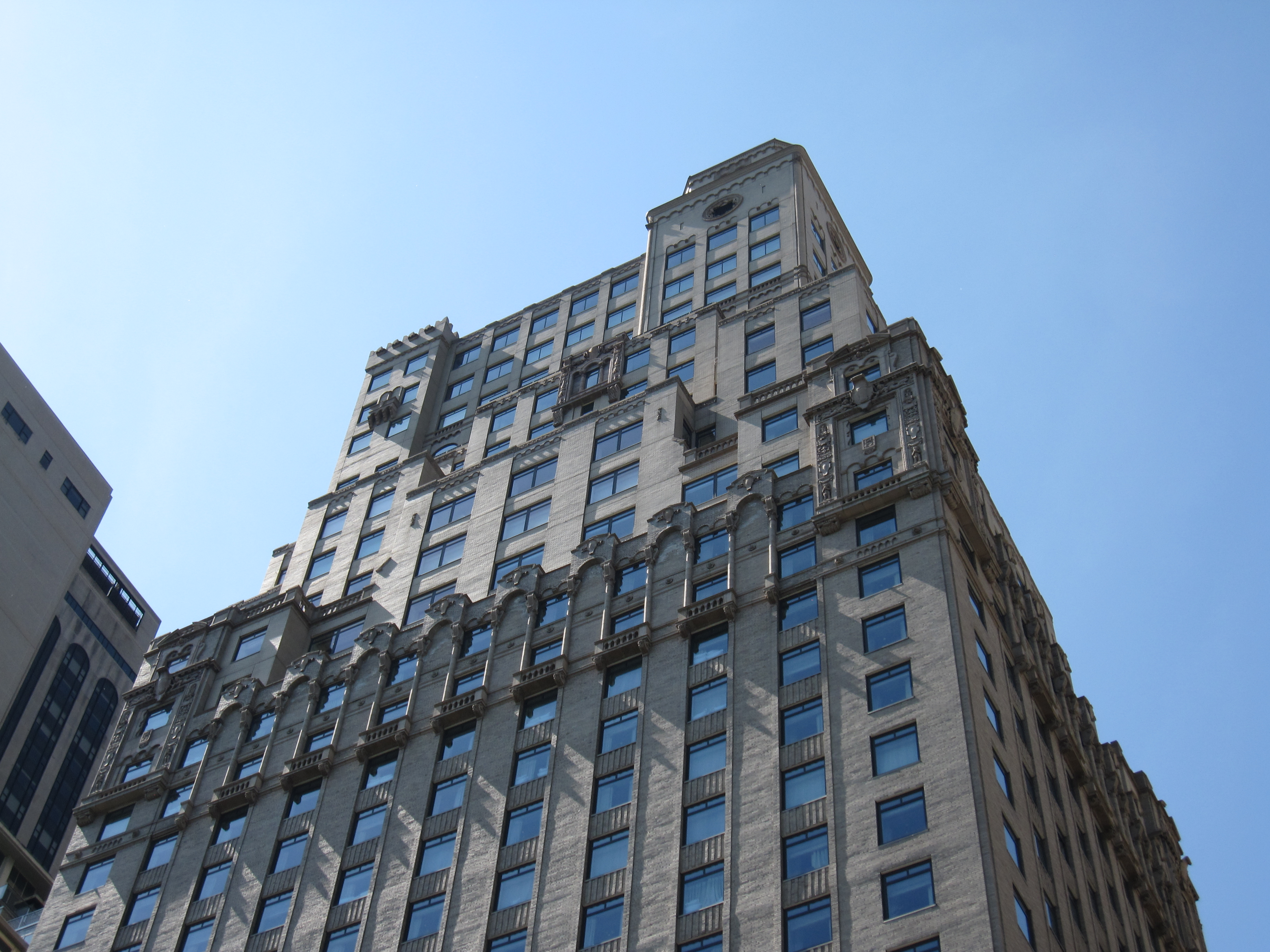
The upper condominium portion of the hotel

== See also ==
- List of former hotels in Manhattan
- Ritz-Carlton Hotel (New York City)
