= Angelina (tea house) =

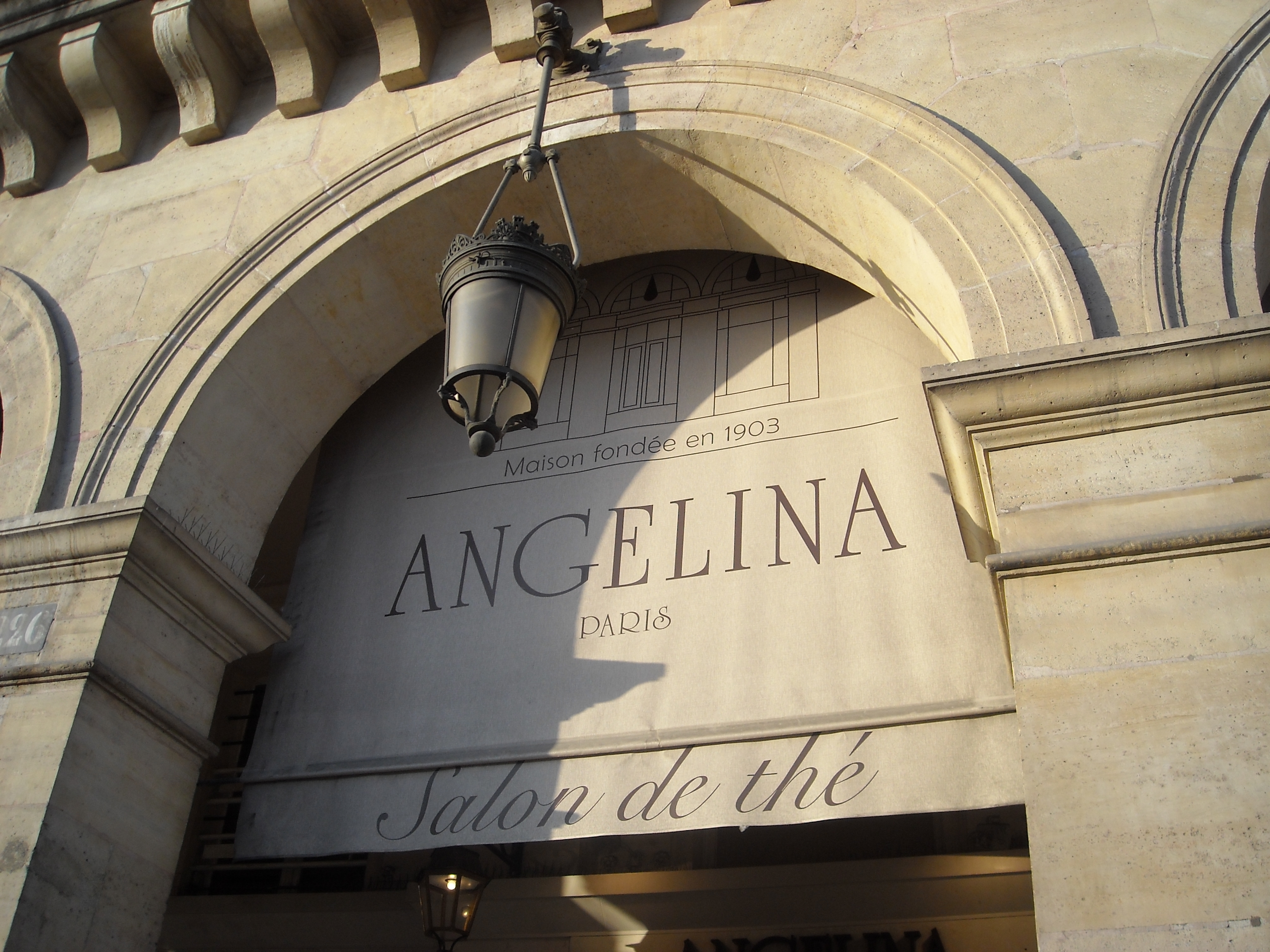
- Entrance

- Location in Paris

Restaurant information
- Established: 1903
- Owner: Groupe Bertrand
- Previous owner: Antoine Rumpelmayer
- Food type: Pâtisserie
- Location: 226 Rue de Rivoli, Paris, 75001, France
- Coordinates: 48.8649357°N 2.3284259°E
- Other locations: Boulevard Haussmann; Palace of Versailles; Musée du Luxembourg; Rue du Bac

Angelina is a popular tea house and café with several locations in Paris and one location in NYC. Angelina is known primarily for its almost pudding-like hot chocolate (chocolat l'Africain) and for its Mont Blanc dessert. The name is also marketed internationally for sweets.

== History ==
The tea house was founded in 1903 by the Austrian confectioner Antoine Rumpelmayer (1832 – 1914), and originally named eponymously "Rumpelmeyer". Rumpelmayer's son René, and from 1916 his widow Angelina, continued the café and pâtisserie. It is named for their daughter. It became an institution frequented by elite Parisians, including Marcel Proust and Coco Chanel.

The tea house was owned by the Rumpelmayer family until 1963. The interior design is by French architect Édouard-Jean Niermans in the Belle Époque style. In 2005, Angelina was taken over by Bertrand Restauration, a division of Groupe Bertrand, a French company, who have expanded the chain in the Middle East and Far East.

In 1982, the tea house welcomes the cast of La Boum 2 to film some scenes for the movie with actors Sophie Marceau and Denise Grey.

== Other venues ==
The original café is at the Tuileries, located at 226 Rue de Rivoli in the 1st arrondissement of Paris. Another boutique is at the Galeries Lafayette on the Boulevard Haussmann, and a Boutique Angelina in the shopping mall at Palais des congrès de Paris.

In 2009, an Angelina café was opened at Petit Trianon in the Palace of Versailles. Two years later, another was opened there, in the Pavillon d'Orléans. There is another at the Musée du Luxembourg and a Boutique Angelina at 108 Rue du Bac. Another tea house opened recently at the Jardin d'Acclimatation in the Bois de Boulogne.

Since 2016, a temporary location for an additional Angelina tea house is located at the Hôtel National des Invalides during the busy seasons (usually from April to October).

In 2018, a franchise was established in Singapore at the Marina Bay Sands hotel.

In November 2020, they opened their first location in New York City. The location spans 3,000 square feet (280 m^{2}), seats 60 people and has marble tables.
