= Vacherin =

Vacherin (French: [vaʃʁɛ̃]) may refer to:

- Several cow's milk cheeses from Switzerland and eastern France, including
  - Vacherin Mont d'Or, a soft cheese made in France and Switzerland
  - Vacherin Fribourgeois, a semi-hard cheese made in Switzerland
- Vacherin (dessert), a cake-shaped dessert originally made of an almond paste shell with double cream filling

== See also ==
- Vacheron
- Vacherie
