= Winold Reiss =

American painter

- c. 1934
- Born: September 16, 1886; Karlsruhe, German Empire
- Died: August 23, 1953 (aged 66); New York City
- Education: The Royal Academy of Fine Arts (Kunstakademie), The School of Applied Arts (Kunstgewerbeschule)
- Notable work: Murals in Cincinnati Union Terminal
- Style: Art Deco

Winold Reiss (September 16, 1886 – August 23, 1953) was a German-born American artist and graphic designer. He was born in Karlsruhe, Germany. In 1913 he immigrated to the United States, where he was able to follow his interest in Native Americans. In 1920 he went West for the first time, working for a lengthy period on the Blackfeet Reservation. Over the years Reiss painted more than 250 works depicting Native Americans. These paintings by Reiss became known more widely beginning in the 1920 and to the 1950s, when the Great Northern Railway commissioned Reiss to do paintings of the Blackfeet which were then distributed widely as lithographed reproductions on Great Northern calendars.

== Early life and education ==
World War I poster (1916)

Reiss was born in Karlsruhe, Germany, in 1886, the second son of Fritz Reiss (1857–1914) and his wife. He grew up surrounded by art, as his father was a well-known Schwarzwald landscape artist and portrait painter. In his early years, Reiss traveled within Germany with his father, who studied peasants of particular types that he wanted to draw or paint. This helped form many of Reiss's ideas about subject matter for portraiture. His older brother Hans Reiss (painter) also became an artist, working as a sculptor and also immigrated to the United States. Reiss studied at the Kunstgewerbeschule in München under Franz von Stuck where he met his future wife, Englishwoman Henrietta Lüthy.

== Career ==
In October 1913, Winold Reiss boarded the SS Imperator and immigrated to America against the will of his parents. Like many Europeans he had been captivated by stories and images of Native Americans. He was excited to think he might be able to paint them. His philosophy was that an artist must travel to find the most interesting subjects; influenced by his father and his own curiosity, he drew subjects from many peoples and walks of life.

Reiss first had clients among the ethnic Germans in New York and worked as a commercial designer.

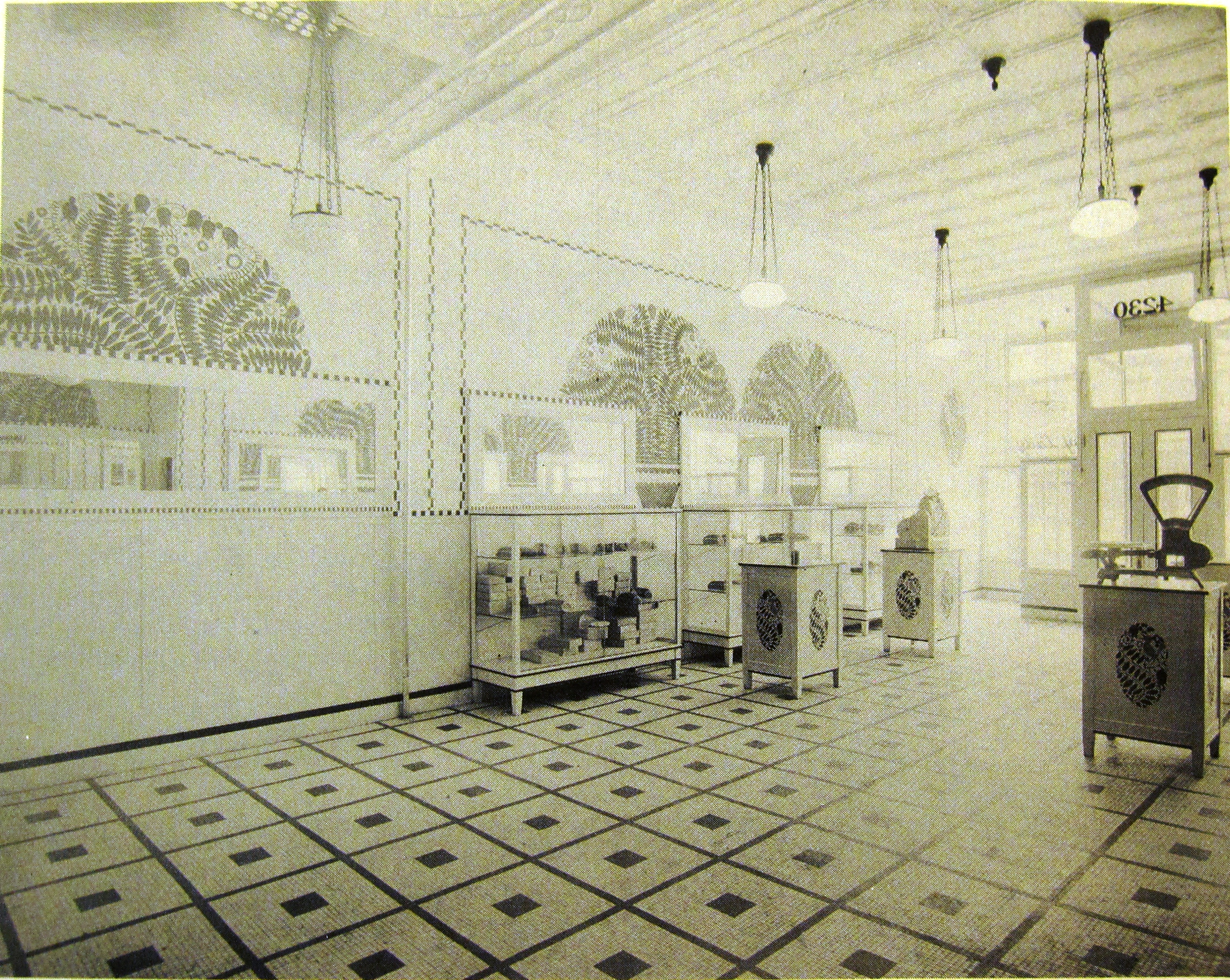
Busy Lady Baking Company on 4230 Broadway, New York (1915)

His designs for the Busy Lady Baking Company on 3620 Broadway (at 149th Street), and one at 4230 Broadway in 1915, were influenced by the designs of Josef Hoffmann and the Vienna Secession, which he had seen a decade before. The lightness of style, use of grids, and gilded and highly colored panels refer more to the Wiener Werkstätte of Vienna than the Jugendstil of Munich.

In 1915, he was lecturing before the Art Students League. With Oskar Wentz, he founded a publication, Modern Art Collector but it had to fold in 1917 for political reasons.

In January 1920, he finally got to go to the West, and spent months on the Blackfeet Reservation in Montana, painting 36 portraits of tribal members. He made relationships that he kept for the rest of his life, and returned to the West to paint Native Americans.He made more than 250 paintings of Native Americans, especially the Blackfeet of Montana.

In 1921, Reiss returned once to Germany for a visit, but settled again in New York City in 1922, where he opened an art school.

Reiss illustrated Alain Locke's historic 1925 anthology The New Negro, an important book about African American culture at the time of the Harlem Renaissance. These included drawings of such key figures as W. E. B. Du Bois, Charles S. Johnson, and Elise Johnson McDougald.

Reprintings of the book, however, have dropped Reiss’s name from the title page and deleted the portfolio of portraits he contributed to the original edition.The changes were documented in 2001 by scholar George Bornstein. George Hutchinson builds on Bornstein’s research to speculate that this may be because of the controversy surrounding the portraits, which depict some of these distinguished African American figures with notably dark skins and features that may suggest caricature, though others are brown or of light complexion. Reiss was a white artist, and so subsequent editors may have felt his work shouldn’t have been included. The effect of the deletion is to suggest that the Harlem Renaissance was a mono racial movement rather than a cosmopolitan one, in which people of various colors and ethnicities participated. In 1925, Reiss offered free tuition to the young Aaron Douglas, who had just arrived in Harlem. Reiss persuaded Locke to let Douglas contribute illustrations to the second edition of The New Negro.

=== 1930s ===
His most outstanding commission was for the work performed on the Cincinnati Union Terminal from 1931–1933, which is now operated as the Cincinnati Museum Center. He blended Art Deco with portraiture which captured the history of Cincinnati through its people. He constructed fourteen mosaics in the train concourse. In 1973, with the rise of air transportation, these were removed to the public spaces of the Cincinnati/Northern Kentucky International Airport, where they would be seen by more people. In 2015, with a major renovation and upgrade projected for the airport, nine of the mosaics were moved to the Cincinnati Convention Center at a cost of $1.4 million.

In 1931, and 1934–37, Reiss organized a summer art school, also referred to as an artists' colony near Glacier National Park.

Another of his noted interior designs was for the Café Rumpelmayer in the Hotel St. Moritz in the 1930s. Study of the development of Reiss's work through the various decades shows that his floral abstractions of the 1930s and the sparse geometry of the 1940s were influenced by his early teachers and leading artists in Germany and Austria. His own commissions had an influence on American design and architecture.

In 1935, Reiss designed the interior for the first Longchamps restaurant, the first restaurant design with exclusively Indian motifs. This is followed by several interior designs for the most diverse buildings, including exterior facades and entrances, for example for the Woolaroc Museum in Oklahoma.

In 1938, Reiss painted 8 oval murals for a Longchamps restaurant in the Empire State Building, named Temptation, Contemplation, Liberation, Anticipation, Animation, Fascination, Adoration and Exultation. Upon remodeling in the 1960s, the murals disappeared, but two reappeared in 2023.

Reiss was known for painting a broad cross section of peoples in the United States. His portraits were considered to be both compassionate and objective, moreso than any artist before him.

In 1946, the now very successful and well-known artist decided to move to the West. He bought a former bank building in Carson City as a studio and place to retire, but never moved into this house. In 1951, after his first stroke, Reiss recovered again, but after his second stroke in 1952, he remained paralyzed.

== Personal life and death ==
Reiss married in Germany and his wife was pregnant when he left for the US in 1913. Their son Winold Tjark Reiss (known as Tjark) was born in Germany on December 27, 1913. The mother and young son immigrated to join Reiss in New York in 1914. After attending local schools, Tjark studied at the Massachusetts Institute of Technology and in Vienna, and became an architect in the United States.

Reiss died on August 29, 1953, in New York City. The Blackfeet spread his ashes along the eastern edge of Glacier National Park.

In 1996, Tjark established the Reiss Partnership to create a vehicle for fostering awareness of his father's artistic legacy and to make it accessible to a broad public.

== Gallery ==
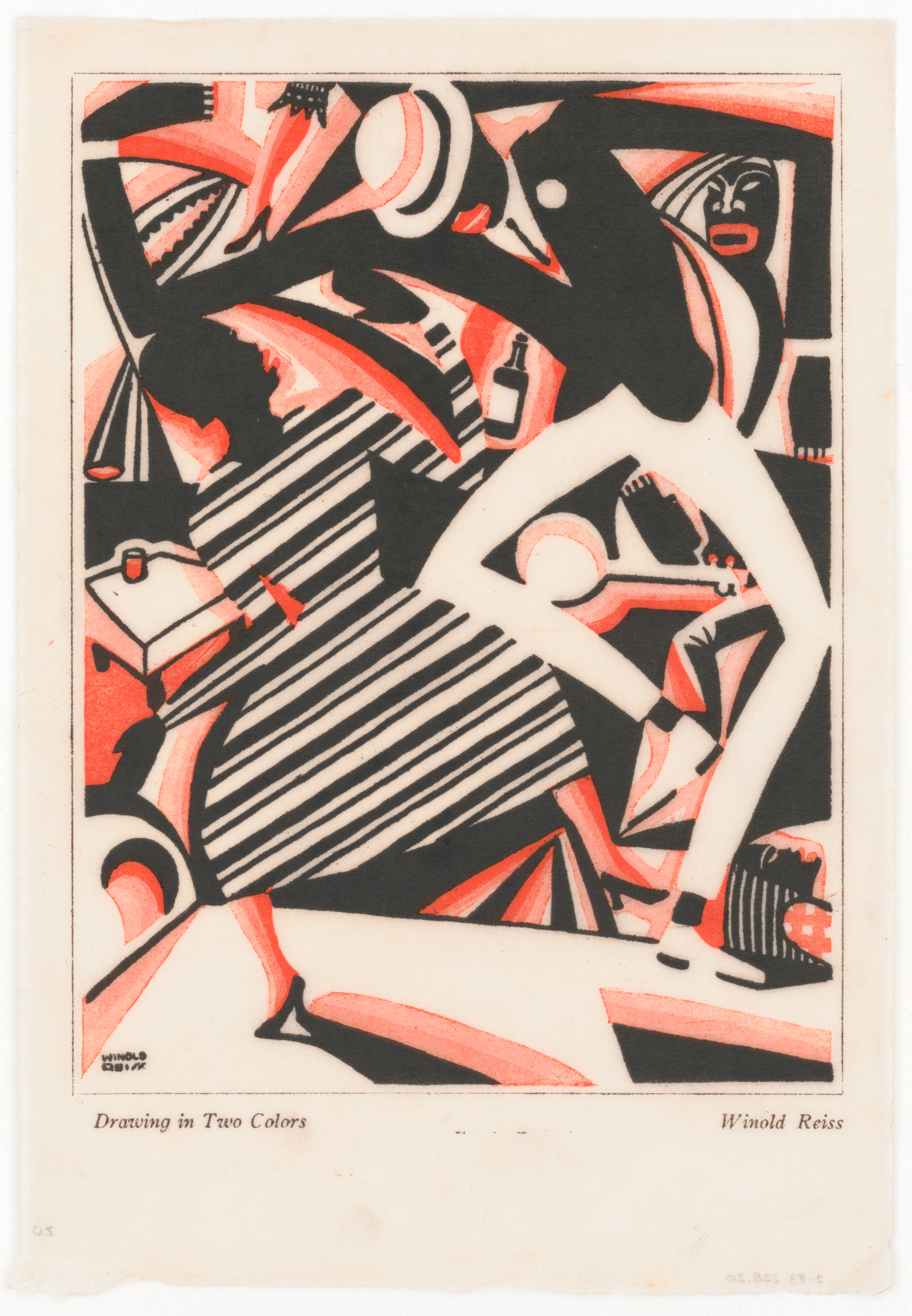
Drawing in two colors
(between 1915 and 1920)

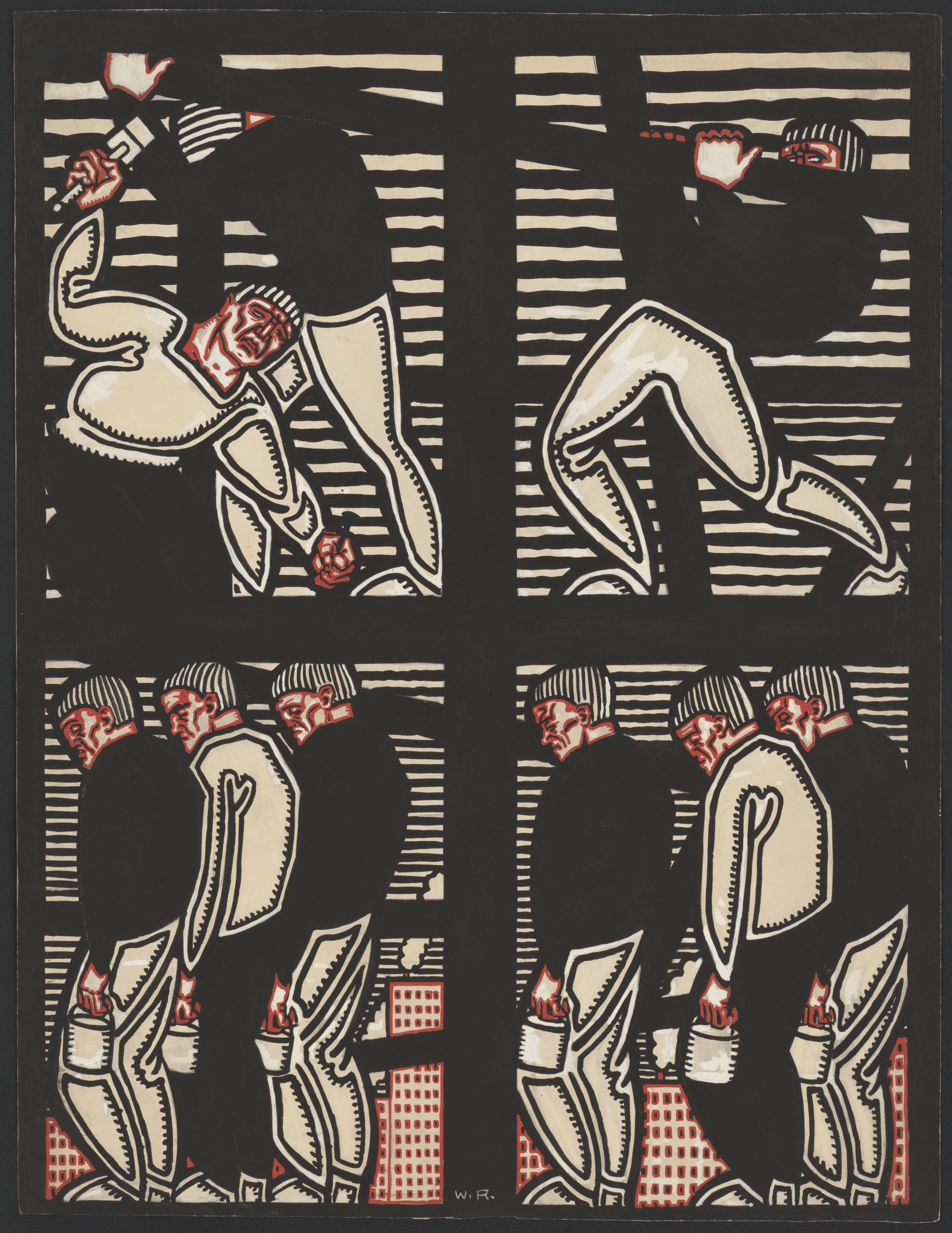
Steel workers
(c. 1920)

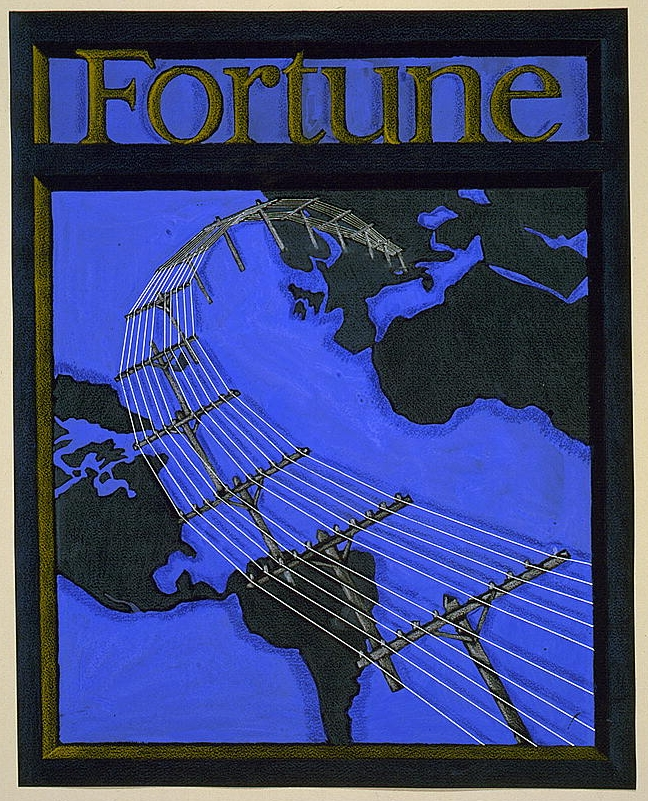
Cover proposal for Fortune magazine (between 1930 and 1940)

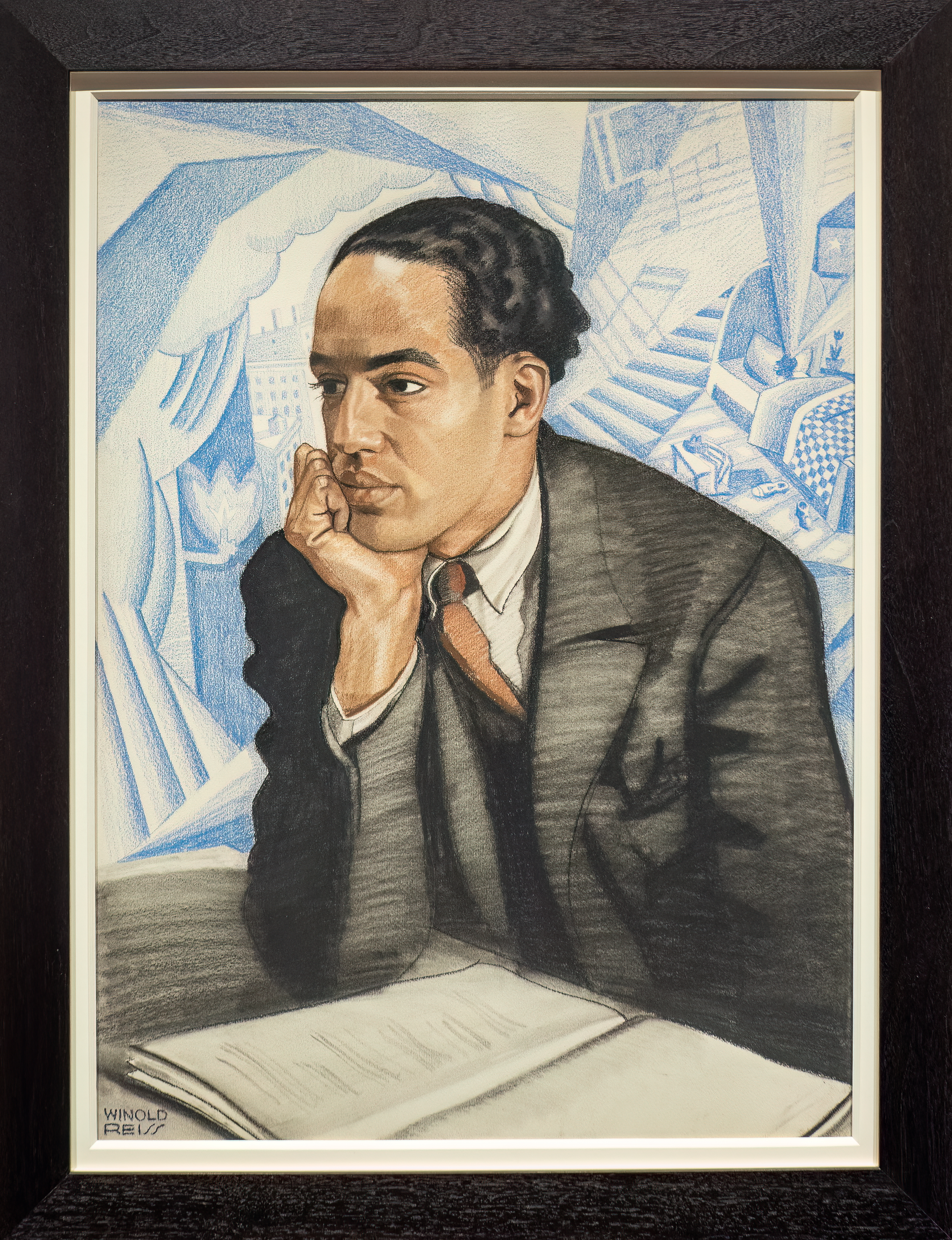
portrait of Langston Hughes (1927)

== Bibliography ==
- Winold Reiss 1886–1953. Centennial Exhibition. Works on paper: Architectural Designs, Fantasies and Portraits. New York: Shepherd Gallery, Associates. November 19, 1986 – January 3, 1987.
- Frank Mehring, "Excerpt from The Mexico Diary: Winold Reiss between Vogue Mexico and Harlem Renaissance (with hyperlinks to audio)" The Journal of Transnational American Studies 7.1 (2016).
- Frank Mehring (ed.): The Multicultural Modernism of Winold Reiss (1886–1953): (Trans)National Approaches to his Work. Deutscher Kunstverlag, Berlin 2022, ISBN 978-3-422-98052-5
