= Vacherin (dessert) =

Dessert made from almond paste and cream

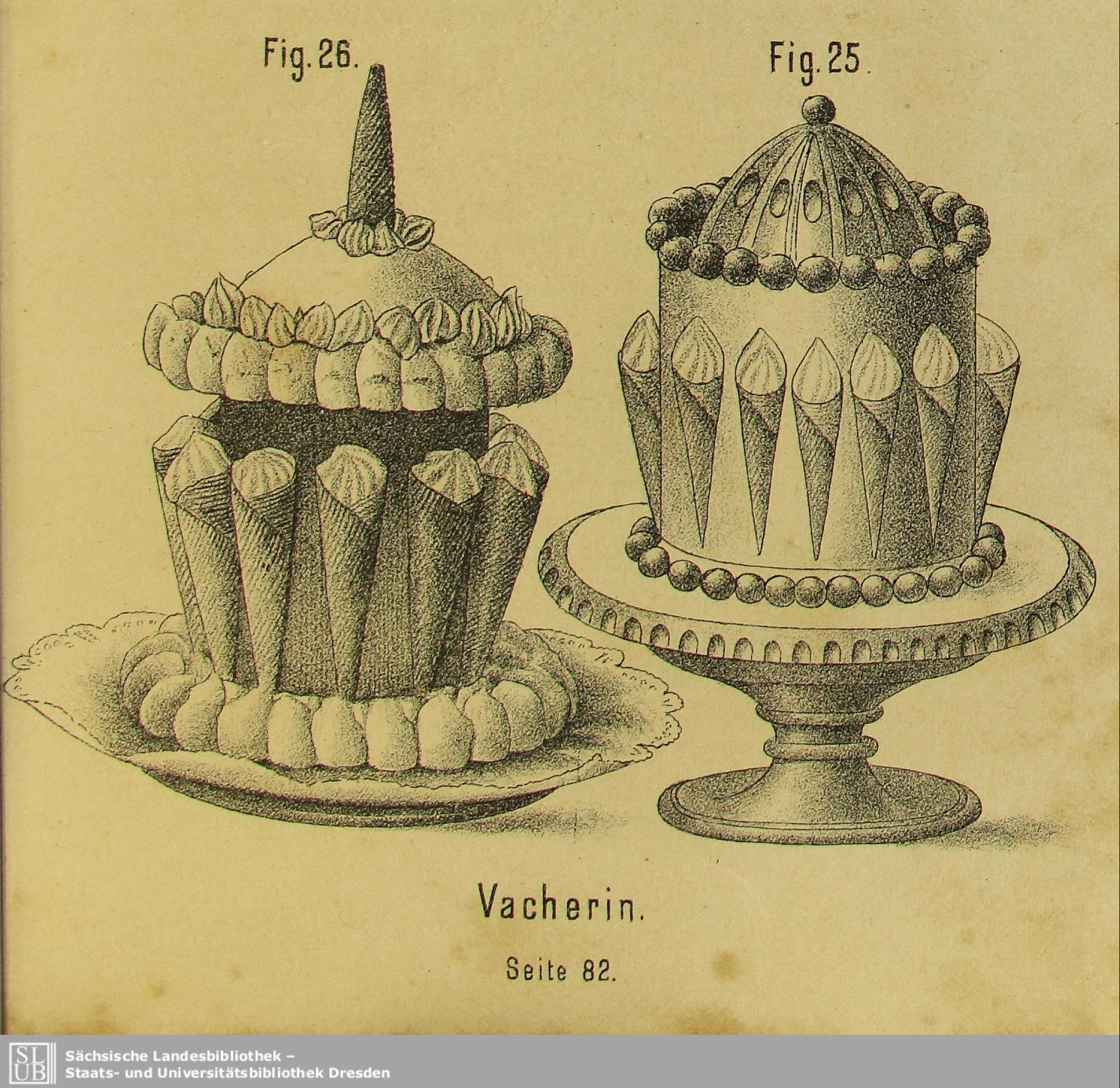
An 1893 representation of two vacherins

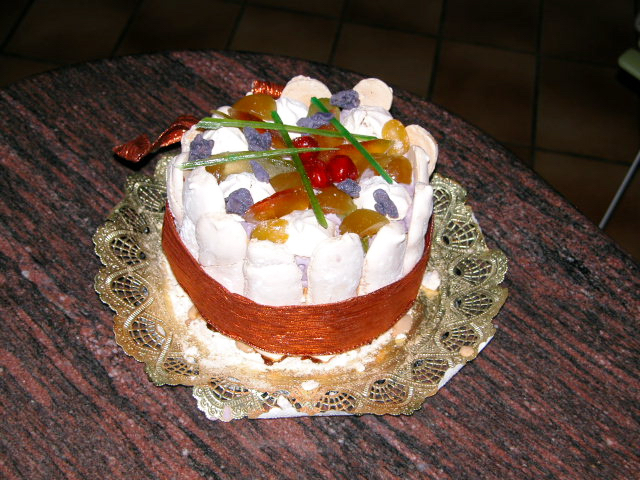
A vacherin glacé

The vacherin (French: [vaʃʁɛ̃]) was originally a cake-shaped dessert made of an almond paste shell filled with (non-frozen) double cream and topped with whipped cream. It appeared in 19th-century Switzerland before reaching Germany and Lyon. Its name likely came from its resemblance to the round shape of vacherin cheese wheels.

A later version, called vacherin glacé (French: [vaʃʁɛ̃ ɡlase], lit. 'frozen vacherin'), replaced the almond paste shell with a meringue shell, and the double cream filling with an ice cream filling, still topped with whipped cream.

== Sources ==
- Boué, Vincent; Delorme, Hubert (2023). The Complete Book of French Cooking.
- Gouffé, Jules (1874). The Royal Book of Pastry and Confectionary.
- Pham, Anne-Laure; Plantive, Mathieu (2023). Le grand livre des fromages (in French).
