= Anton Rumpelmayer =

Austrian confectioner

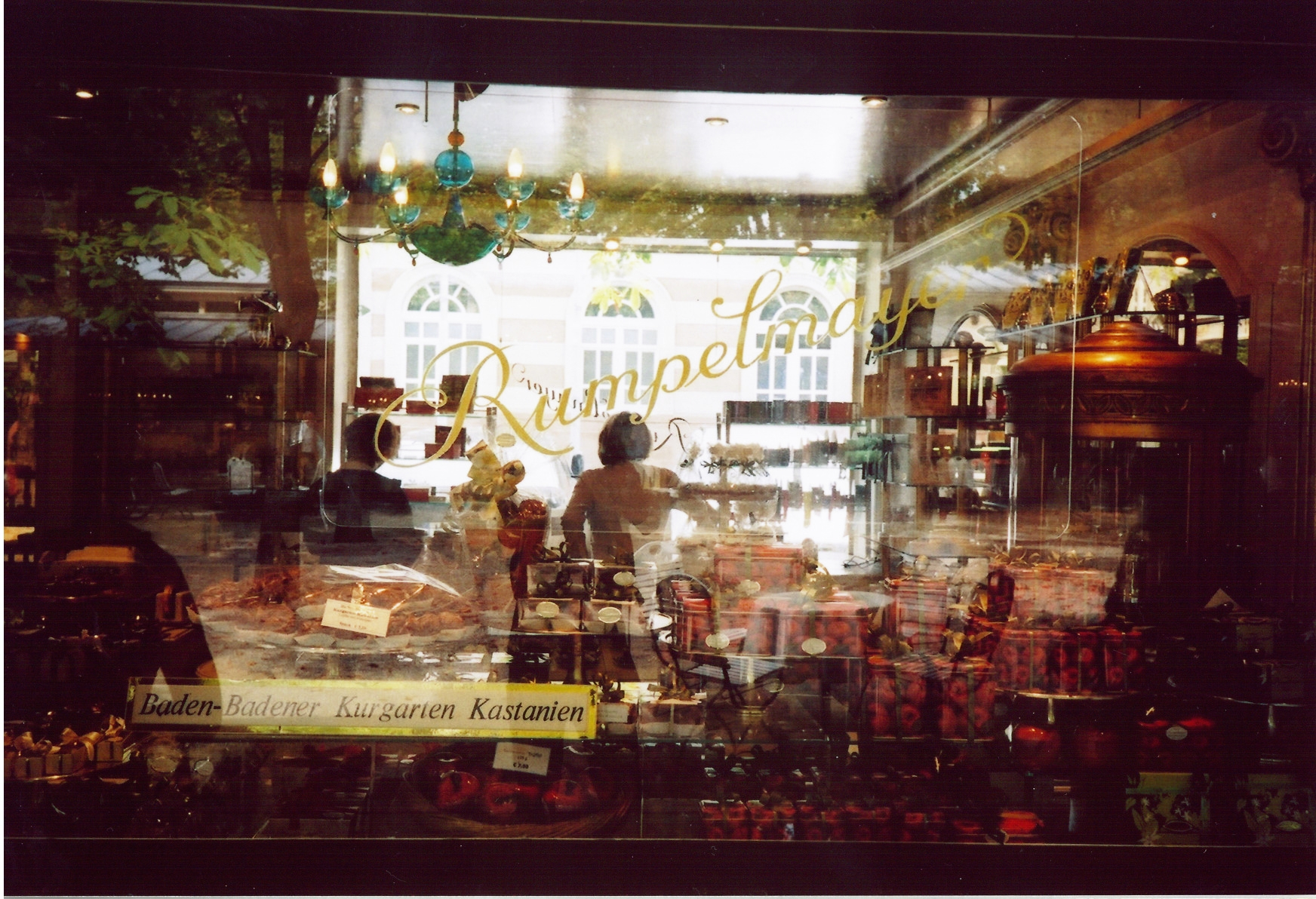
- Rumpelmayer patisserie in Baden-Baden (2008)
- Born: 13 February 1832; Pressburg, Kingdom of Hungary, Austrian Empire
- Died: 25 July 1914 (aged 82); Saint-Martin-Vésubie, France
- Other names: Antoine Rumpelmayer
- Occupation: Confectioner
- Known for: High-class cafés

Anton Rumpelmayer (13 February 1832 in Pressburg, Austria – 25 July 1914 in Saint-Martin-Vésubie, France) was an Austrian confectioner and k.u.k. Hoflieferant ("Purveyor to the Royal and Imperial Court", equivalent in the United Kingdom to holding a Royal warrant of appointment). He worked in France, where he was known as Antoine Rumpelmayer.

== Biography ==
In 1870, the confectioner Rumpelmeyer moved from Pressburg (now Bratislava, Slovakia) – others say from Upper Austria – to the French Riviera. He probably first worked in Viktor Sylvain Perrimond's business in Menton. In 1896 they founded the Perrimond-Mayer company and opened new shops in Cannes, Nice and Aix-les-Bains. The Rumpelmayer establishment at 107 Avenue du Général du Gaulle in Aix was opened in 1887. It is still open today.

Empress Elisabeth of Austria-Hungary often visited the area. In the course of these travels, she visited the Rumpelmayer establishment, and as a result, he was received at the Vienna Court to be awarded the honour of Hofzuckerbäcker ("Confectioner to the Court"). He was awarded this in 1896 by the Empress in person and is thus one of the very few whose award was made verbally by an imperial majesty. Rumpelmayer's partner received the honour at the same time.

In Dresden, Conditorei Rumpelmayer GmbH ran its own factory producing chocolate candies, fruit preserves and sweet pastries. The company had branches in Baden-Baden, Bad Nauheim, Frankfurt (at Gallusanlage) and Berlin (at 208/209 Kurfürstendamm). The Rumpelmayer in Baden-Baden is still open. Rumpelmayer was also Purveyor to the Court of Baden and Saxony.

In 1903, Rumpelmayer opened a shop at 226 Rue de Rivoli in Paris and another branch with his son René. René Rumpelmayer was an accomplished balloonist setting the world distance record of 2,434 km with Mme. (Gustav) Goldschmidt in March, 1913. Rene died in 1915. From 1916 his widow Angelina (née Guillarmou) took over. The Angelina tea house became the meeting place of Parisian high society, and is still open.

Further Rumpelmayer Cafés opened, operated either directly or as franchises. The one in St James's Street, London became a household name. Its delivery service even found its way into literature: it is mentioned several times in Virginia Woolf's novel Mrs Dalloway.

Another café was located in the Hotel St. Moritz at Central Park in New York City. It opened at the same time as the hotel in early 1930. The architect Winold Reiss designed the building in the Art Déco style. The café closed, with the hotel, in the 1990s.
