= Foggy Bottom =

Neighborhood in Washington, D.C., United States

Coordinates: 38°53′54″N 77°02′56″W

- Neighborhood of Washington, D.C.
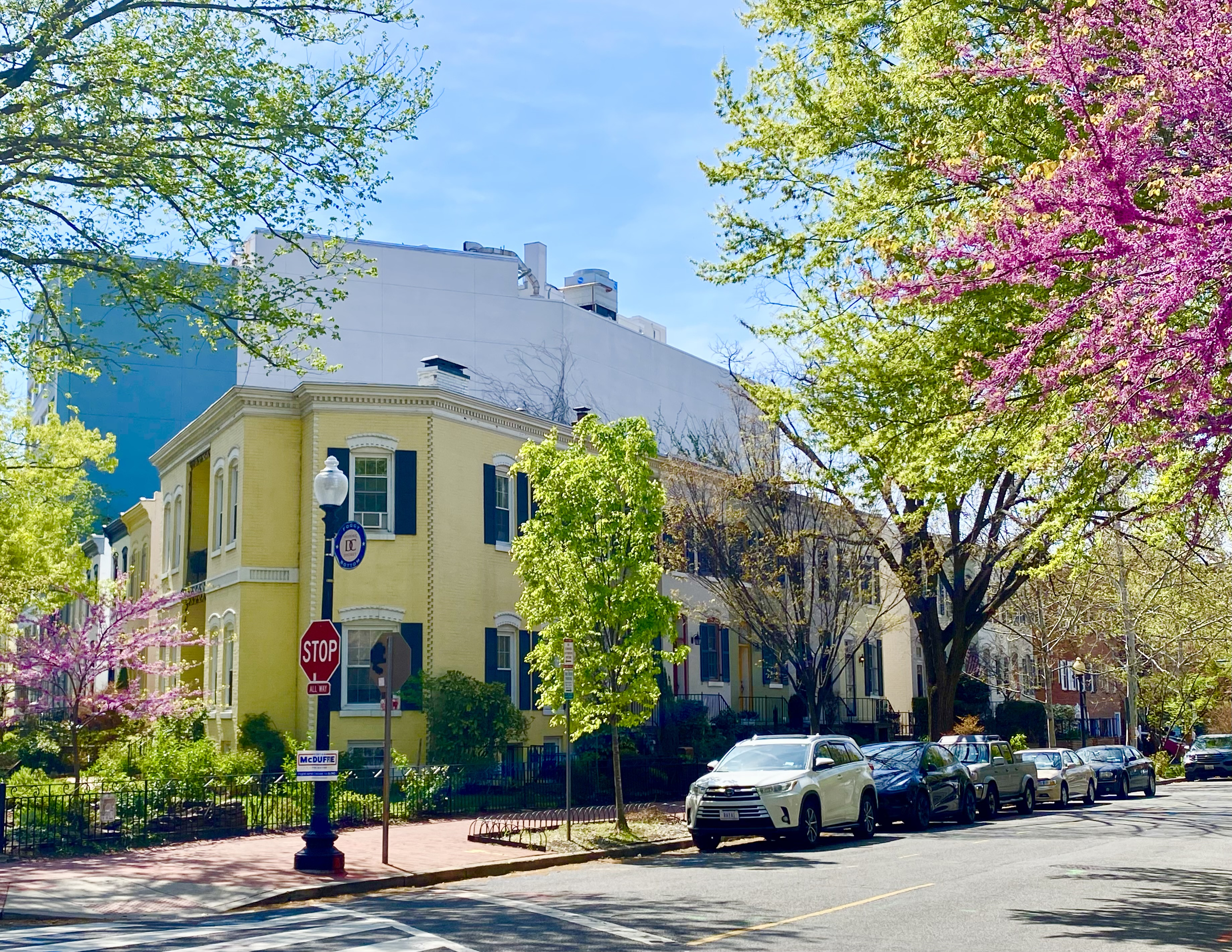
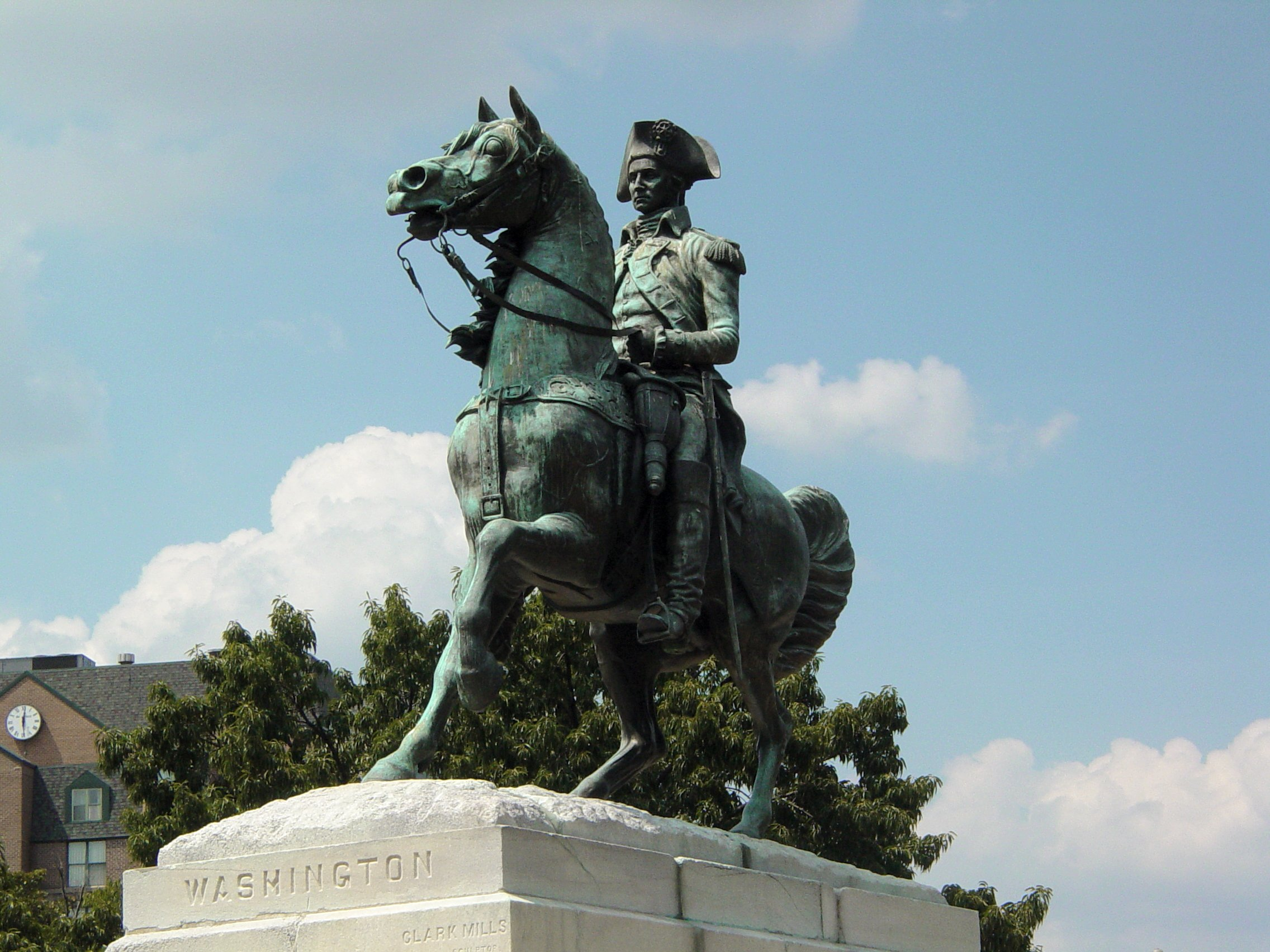
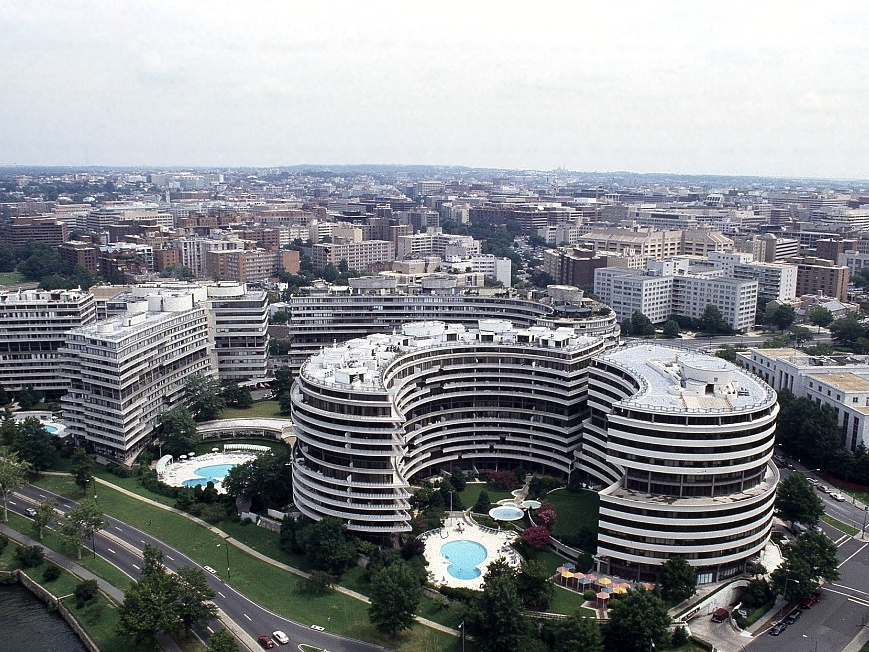
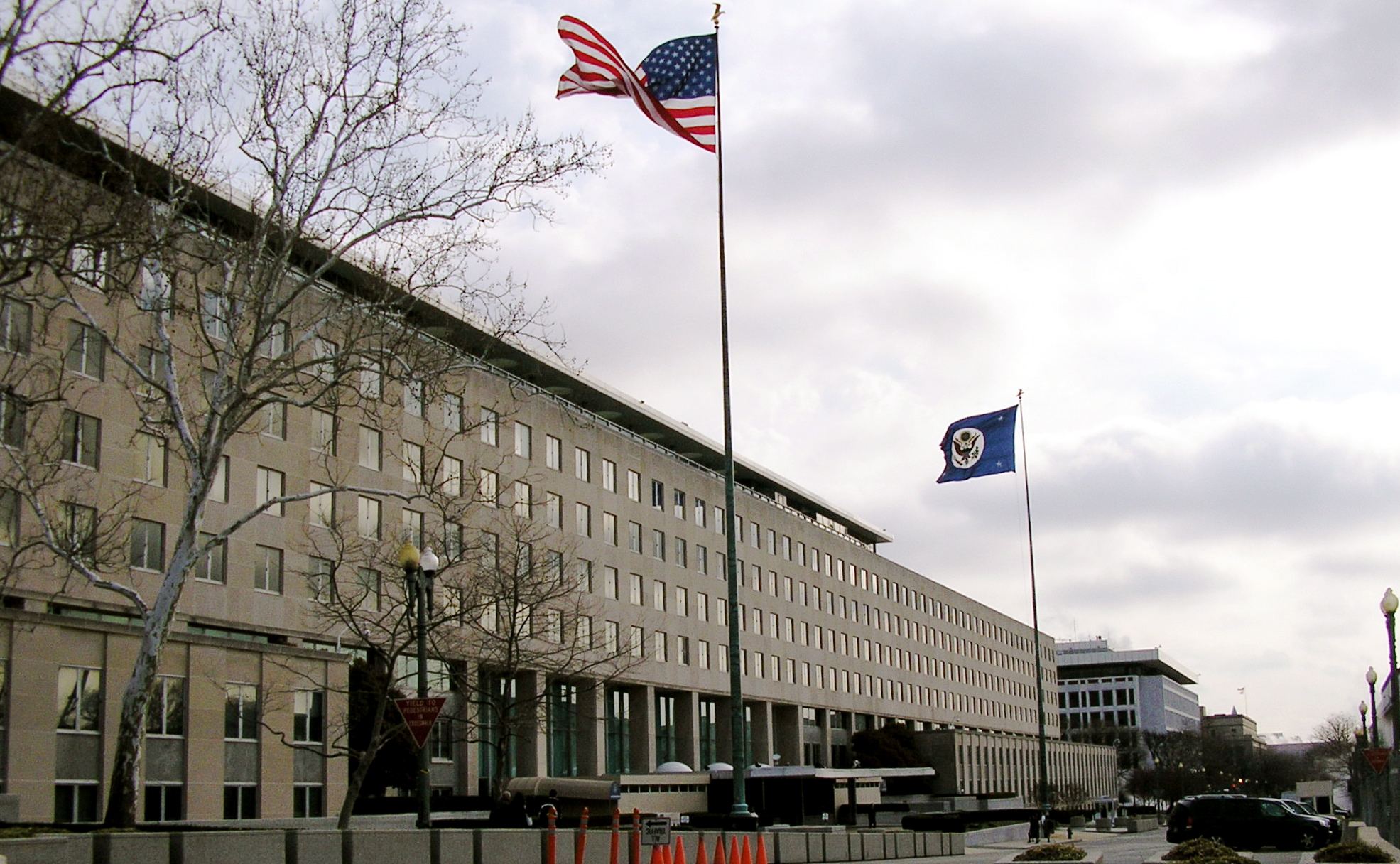
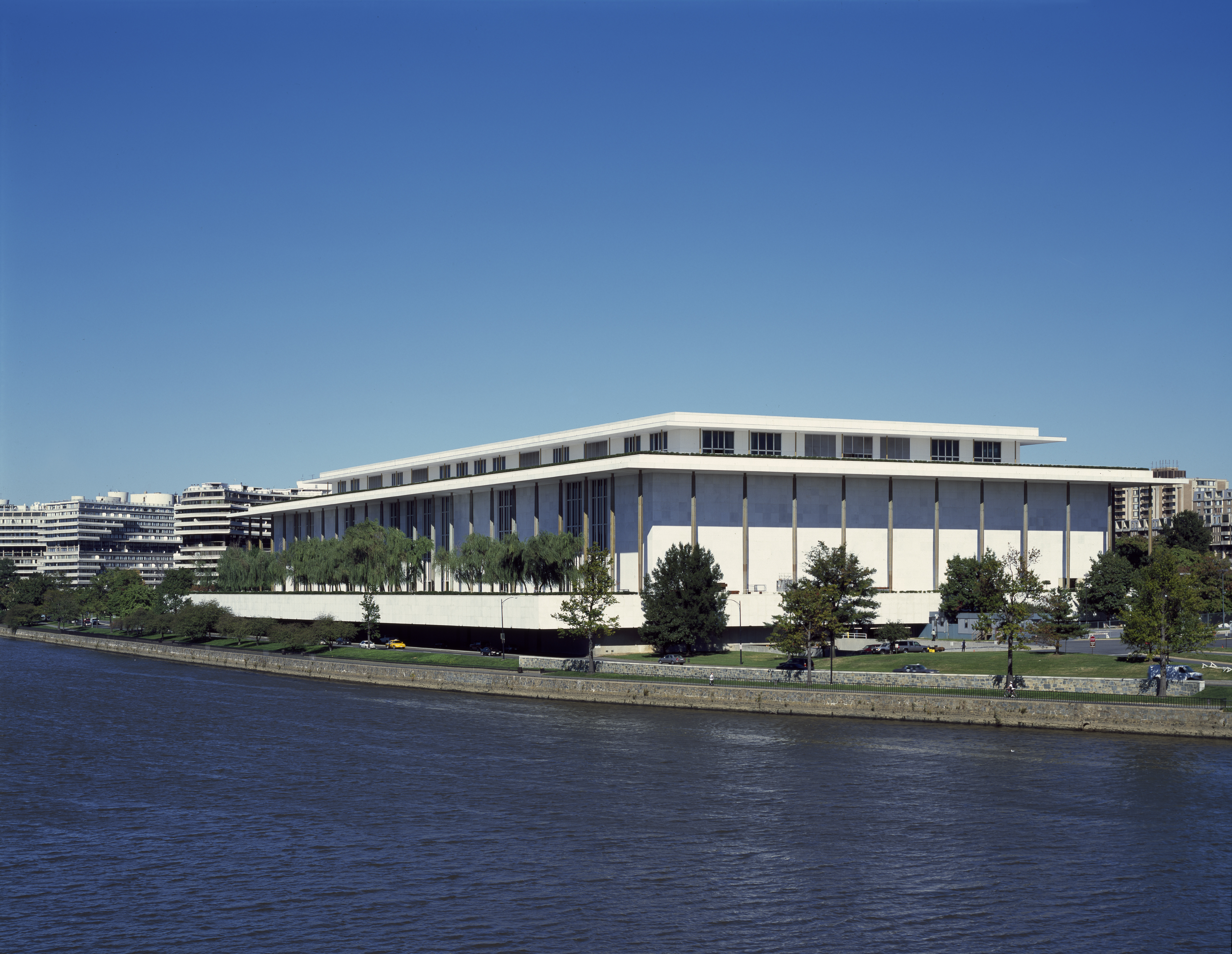
- Foggy Bottom Historic District George Washington Statue at Washington Circle Watergate complex Harry S Truman Building of the United States Department of State George Washington University Kennedy Center

- Country: United States
- District: Washington, D.C.
- Quadrant: Northwest
- Ward: 2

Foggy Bottom is a neighborhood of Washington, D.C., United States, located in the city's northwest quadrant. It stretches west of the White House towards the Potomac River, north of the National Mall, east of Georgetown, south of the West End neighborhood and west of Downtown.

Foggy Bottom originated in a landholding planned as a town in the 1760s by Jacob Funk. Following the establishment of the District of Columbia in 1791, the neighborhood first emerged as a lightly settled area with both wealthy and middle class residents. The opening of the Chesapeake and Ohio Canal (C&O) in the 1830s, which provided access to coal, limestone, and other commodities, expanded Foggy Bottom's industrial capacity. By the mid-19th century, Foggy Bottom's western half became primarily a working class community composed of immigrants from Ireland, Germany, and elsewhere in Europe; many found work in its factories, which consisted of businesses including breweries, lime kilns, and a gasworks. Its black population, which had resided in Foggy Bottom since its inception, also expanded as freedmen migrated to Washington in the aftermath of the American Civil War and emancipation. Like elsewhere in Washington during its post-Civil War population boom, alley dwellings and shanties emerged in Foggy Bottom to house its poorest residents, many of whom were black laborers and families.

Deindustrialization caused by the decline of the C&O Canal and Prohibition resulted in Foggy Bottom's historical working class residents migrating to the region's suburbs and newer neighborhoods during the first several decades of the 20th century. This development mostly excluded Foggy Bottom's black residents, who were significantly restricted in their choice of housing by the area's prevailing Jim Crow policies and racially restrictive housing covenants. Private developers, government agencies, and the George Washington University, which had moved to the neighborhood in 1912, demolished many of Foggy Bottom's alley dwellings and tenements during the first half of the 20th century, facilitating its eventual transformation into a white, middle class neighborhood and mostly displacing its black population by 1960.

Today, Foggy Bottom is part of Washington's central business district and is home to the headquarters of various U.S. government agencies and international organizations, including the International Monetary Fund, the World Bank, the United States Department of State, and the United States Department of the Interior. It is also the location of George Washington University's main campus, which encompasses over 40 acres of Foggy Bottom east of 23rd Street, the Kennedy Center, the national cultural center that serves as a memorial to President John F. Kennedy, and the Watergate complex, the location of the 1972 Watergate scandal. Two historic districts, the Foggy Bottom Historic District and the George Washington University-Old West End Historic District, incorporate much of Foggy Bottom's remaining historic architecture.

== Etymology ==
The origin of Foggy Bottom's name is uncertain. It emerged sometime in the 19th century, and was in use by the local press by the 1870s. The name is speculated to have been in reference to the neighborhood's originally unpopulated, swampy southern section, or the fog that would accumulate with industrial smog from its factories along the Potomac River bank.

== History ==
=== Early history through Civil War ===
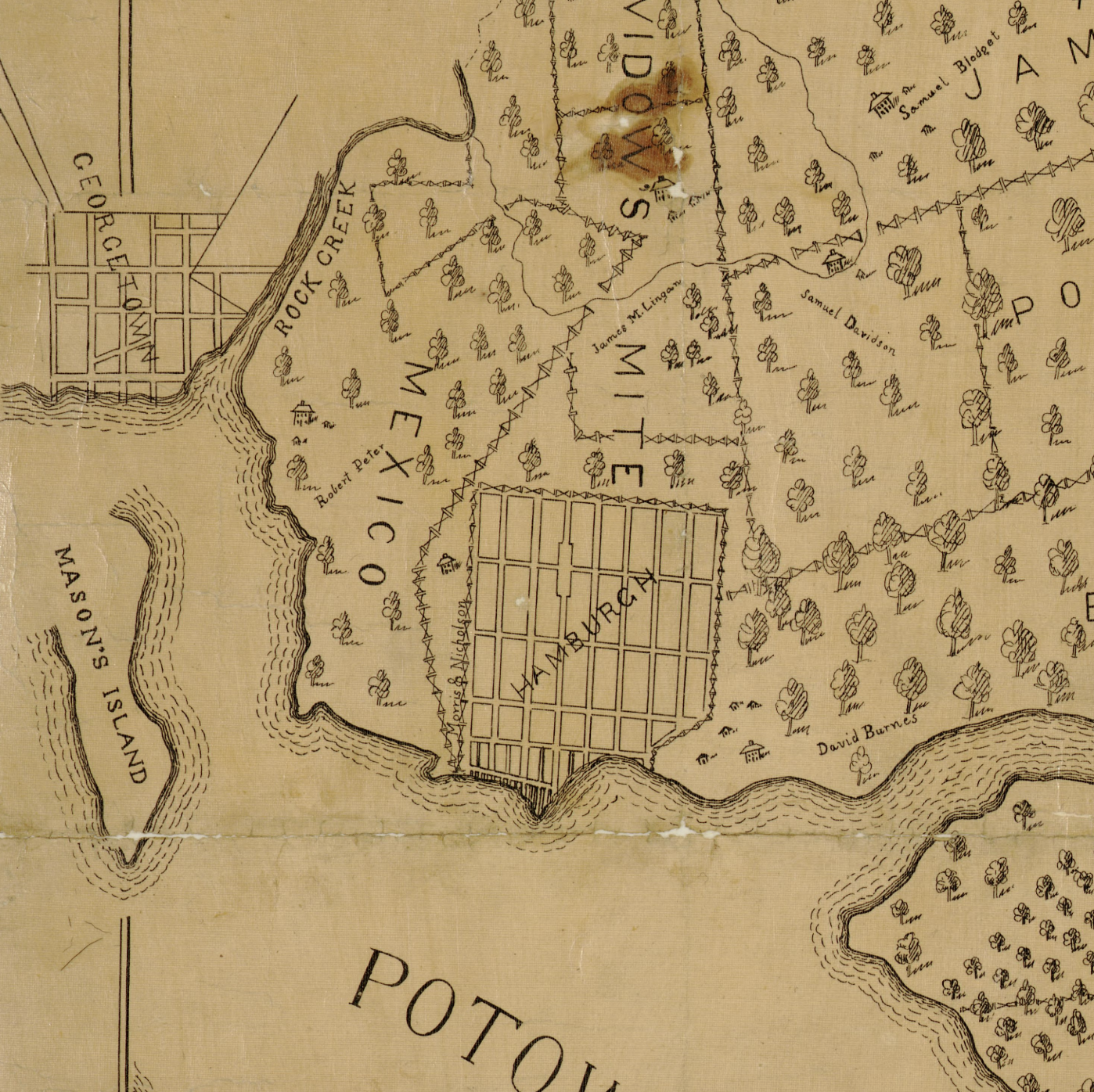
Hamburgh and surrounding landholdings in 1792

Prior to its colonization by the British, present-day Foggy Bottom and the broader Washington region were inhabited by indigenous peoples from at least 10,000 BCE. Artifacts unveiled during an archeological dig near Whitehurst Freeway in 1996 included prehistoric ceramics, tools, and hearths that have been dated between the Middle Archaic (6500–3000 BCE) to Late Woodland (900–1600) periods. Evidence suggests the existence of a large settlement near the confluence of the Potomac River and Rock Creek, likely to take advantage of local fish runs. By the time of John Smith's voyage up the Potomac River in 1608, the Washington area was inhabited by the Algonquian-speaking Nacotchtank. Conflict with British colonizers and disease eventually forced the Nacotchtank from their homeland, and by the 18th century they had migrated elsewhere or been absorbed into the Piscataway.

Located within the Province of Maryland under the Lords Baltimore during the colonial era, present-day Foggy Bottom was originally agricultural and cultivated by both colonists and enslaved labor. Major produce included tobacco, wheat, and livestock. Part of Widow's Mite, which was created in 1664 and one of the area's earliest landholdings, was purchased in 1765 by Jacob Funk, a businessman and landowner of German descent. Funk had earlier established the town of Funkstown, Maryland, and was likely motivated in his efforts by anticipated trade with Ohio Country enabled by the Potomac River. Funk bought 130 acres of land roughly bounded by present-day 24th Street, 19th Street, H Street, and the Potomac. Calling the plot Hamburgh, Funk laid out its street grid in 1771, subdivided it into 234 lots, and attempted to develop it into a town. While a majority of the parcels were sold by 1790, aside from a church and a home built by Funk, the area remained lightly settled. Other landowners in the area were James Lingan and Georgetown merchant Robert Peter, who both ran plantations surrounding Hamburgh.

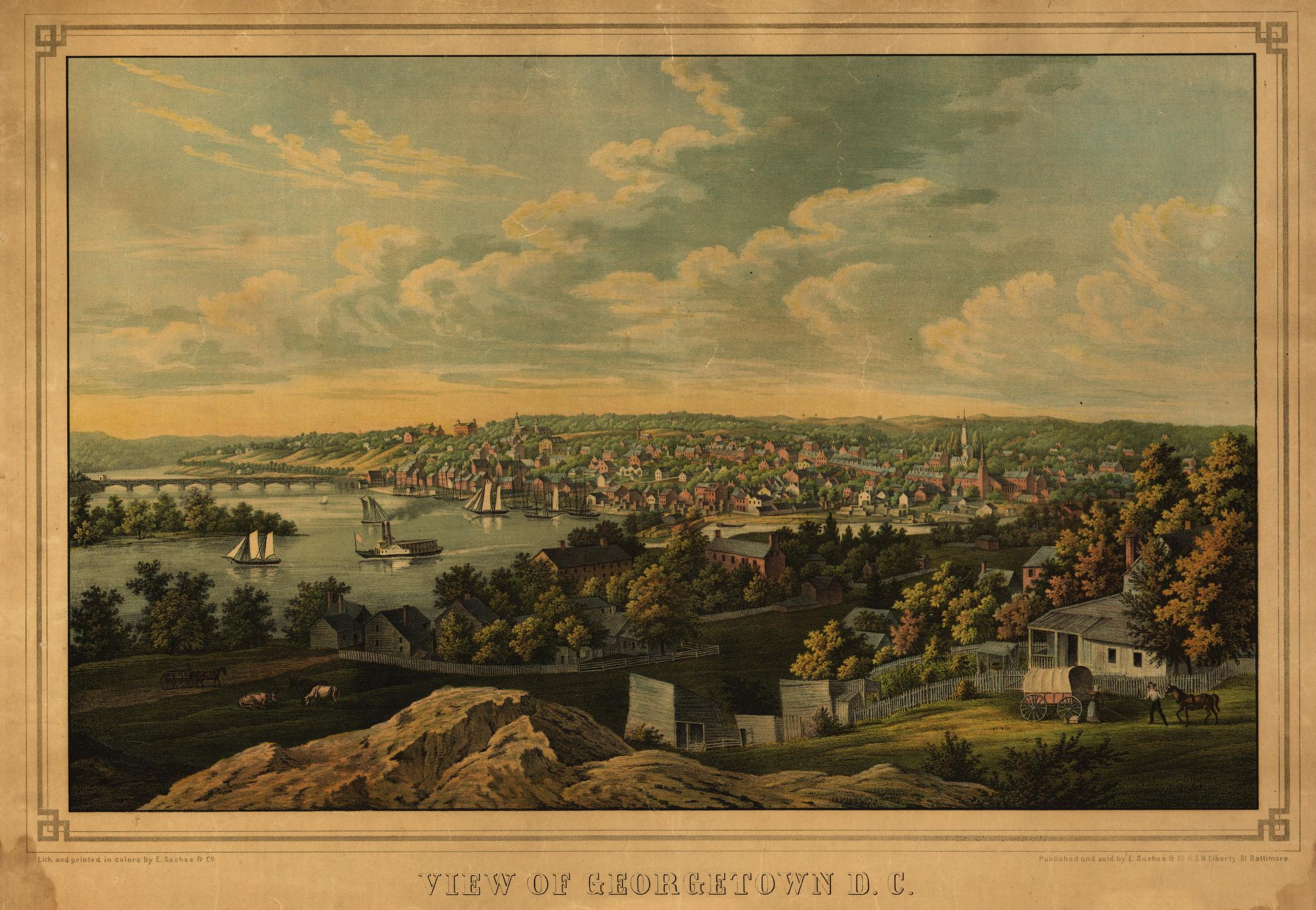
View of Georgetown from the U.S. Naval Observatory in 1855, with Foggy Bottom depicted in the foreground

With the establishment of the District of Columbia in 1791, all preexisting landholdings in Foggy Bottom were incorporated into the city. Pierre Charles L'Enfant's plan envisioned it as the site of Washington Circle and a fortification. By 1800, Foggy Bottom had 27 habitable buildings, and was generally only sparsely settled relative to other areas of Washington during the early 19th century. Residents from this period included wealthy families from Georgetown, such as the Peters, as well as craftspeople. Foggy Bottom's initial development, today represented by grand homes like the Octagon House and the Ringgold–Carroll House, was distributed primarily in the neighborhood's western and eastern areas; much of the southern part was unoccupied.

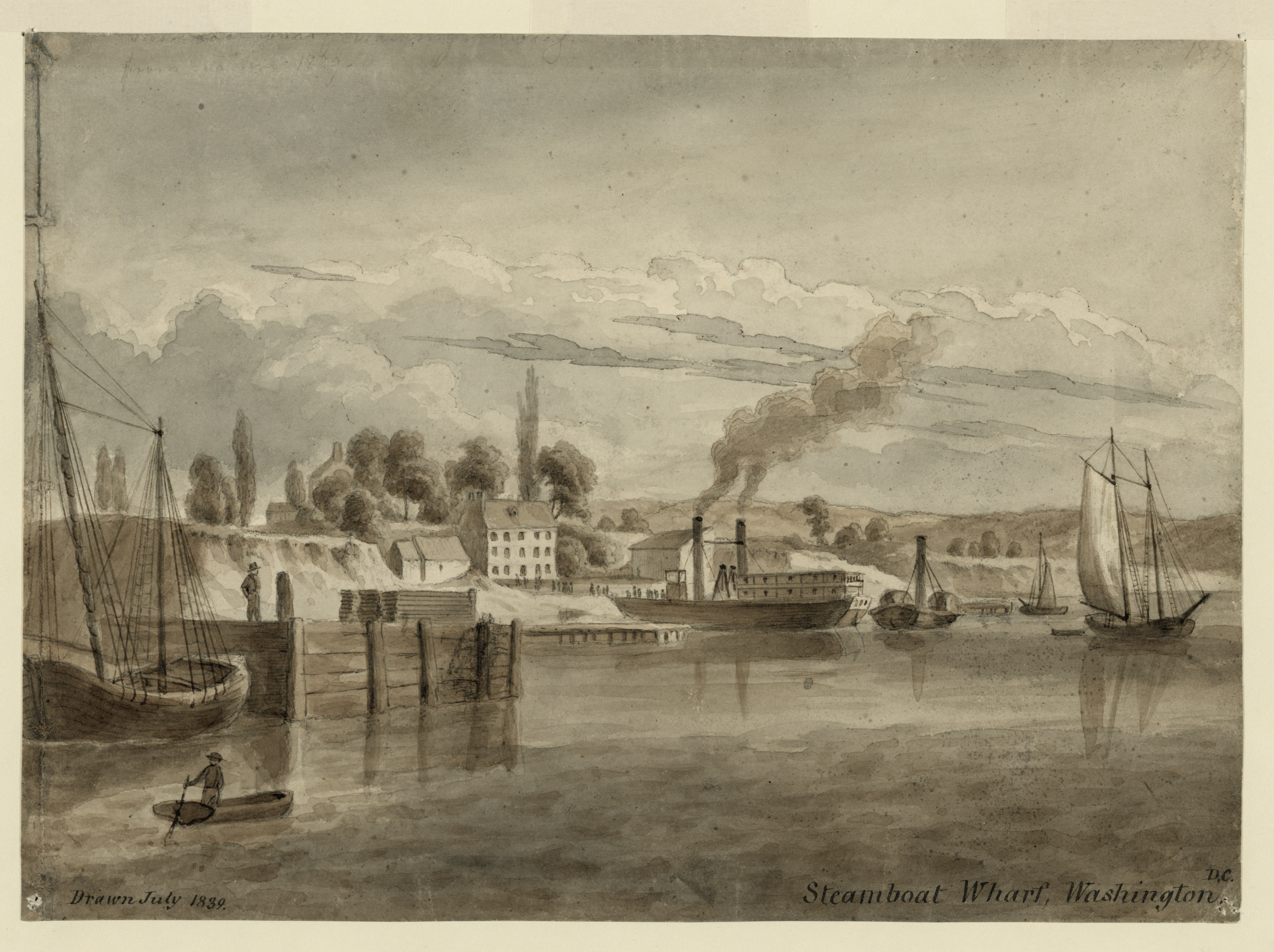
Wharf and Glass House in 1839. The Glass House opened in 1807 and produced glass until 1833, after which the building was leased to a variety of other businesses.

Nascent industry in Foggy Bottom such as shipping, warehousing, glassblowing, and brewing concentrated near wharfs along the Potomac River and Rock Creek. The completion of the Chesapeake and Ohio Canal (C&O) in 1837 brought more business to Foggy Bottom, including William Easby's Wharf, which supplied canal boats and industrial storage. The most significant of these was the Washington Gas Light Company, which began building facilities in Foggy Bottom in 1856 for the production of coal gas. Beyond residential and commercial activity, the U.S. government also established a presence in the neighborhood in 1844 with the construction of the original U.S. Naval Observatory campus on Camp Hill. By the middle of the 19th century, more factories were in operation in Foggy Bottom, which included lime kilns and fertilizer manufacturers. The neighborhood's increasingly industrial character began attracting working class labor, many of whom were European immigrants; unskilled workers made up 42% of Foggy Bottom's population in 1860.

During the Civil War, the Union Army founded Camp Fry, a base of the Veteran Reserve Corps, in 1863 south of Washington Circle along 23rd Street. Other wartime facilities included corrals for horses and livestock, and the F Street House in the eastern part of Foggy Bottom, which served as the headquarters of the Commissioner General for Prisoners between 1862 and 1867.

=== Post-Civil War industrialization ===
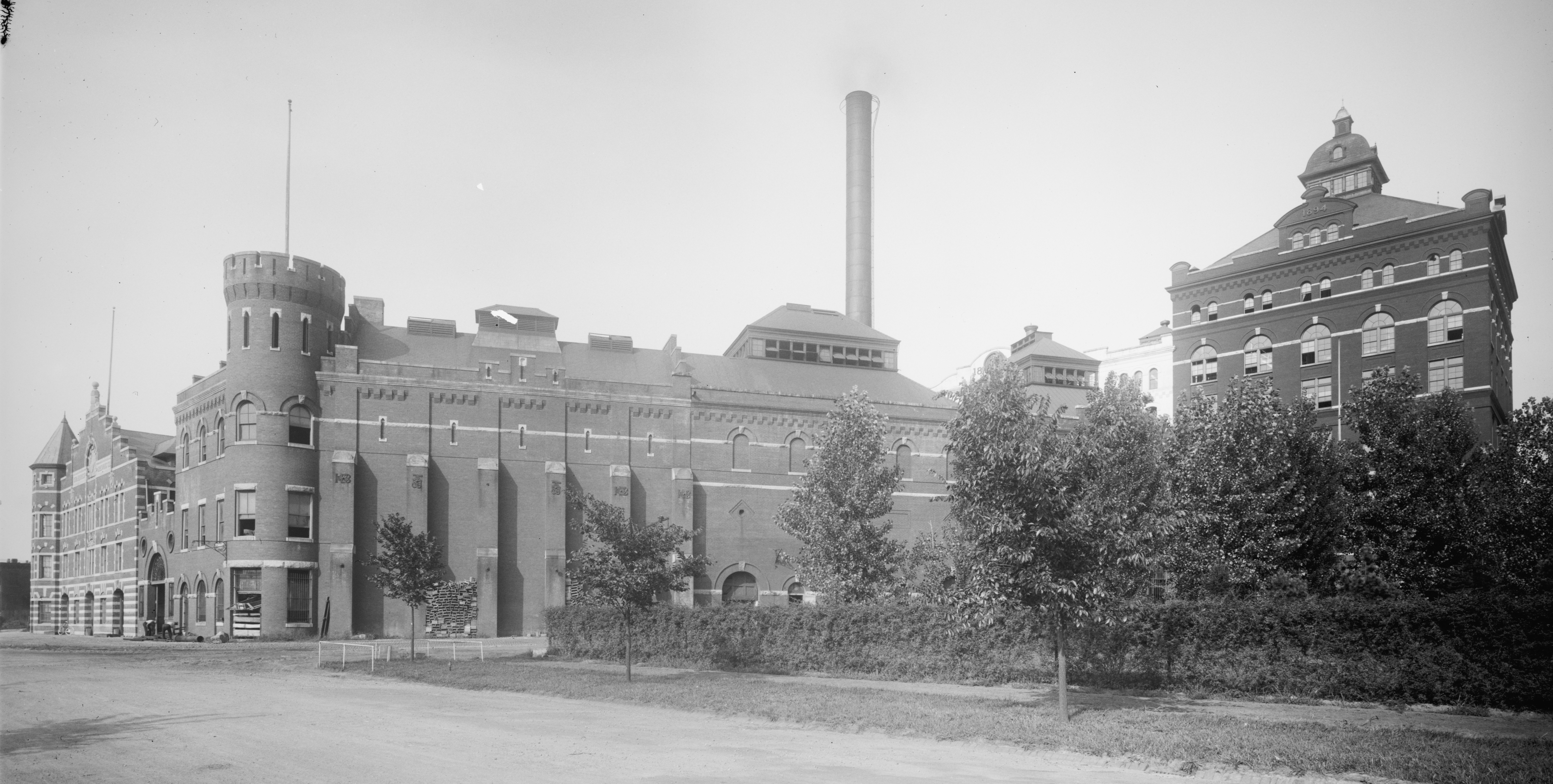
The Heurich Brewing Company building in 1910. Built in 1895, the brewery was capable of producing 5,000 gallons of beer per day, and also housed an ice maker and bottling plant.

The construction of horse-drawn streetcar networks encouraged Washington's wealthier residents to move further out from the city center after the Civil War, resulting in a fall in land values; this, as well as the arrival of more heavy industry businesses—which depended on the C&O Canal's supply of coal, limestone, and other raw materials—facilitated Foggy Bottom's continued transition to becoming an industrial, working class neighborhood. New companies included pavers, coal dealers, bottlers, and breweries. Of the breweries, the Christian Heurich Brewing Company founded by German immigrant Christian Heurich in 1872 became a prominent regional producer and employer. Other significant industrial facilities built during this period were the Washington Gas Light Company's expanded operations, which included larger gas tanks along 26th and G Streets.

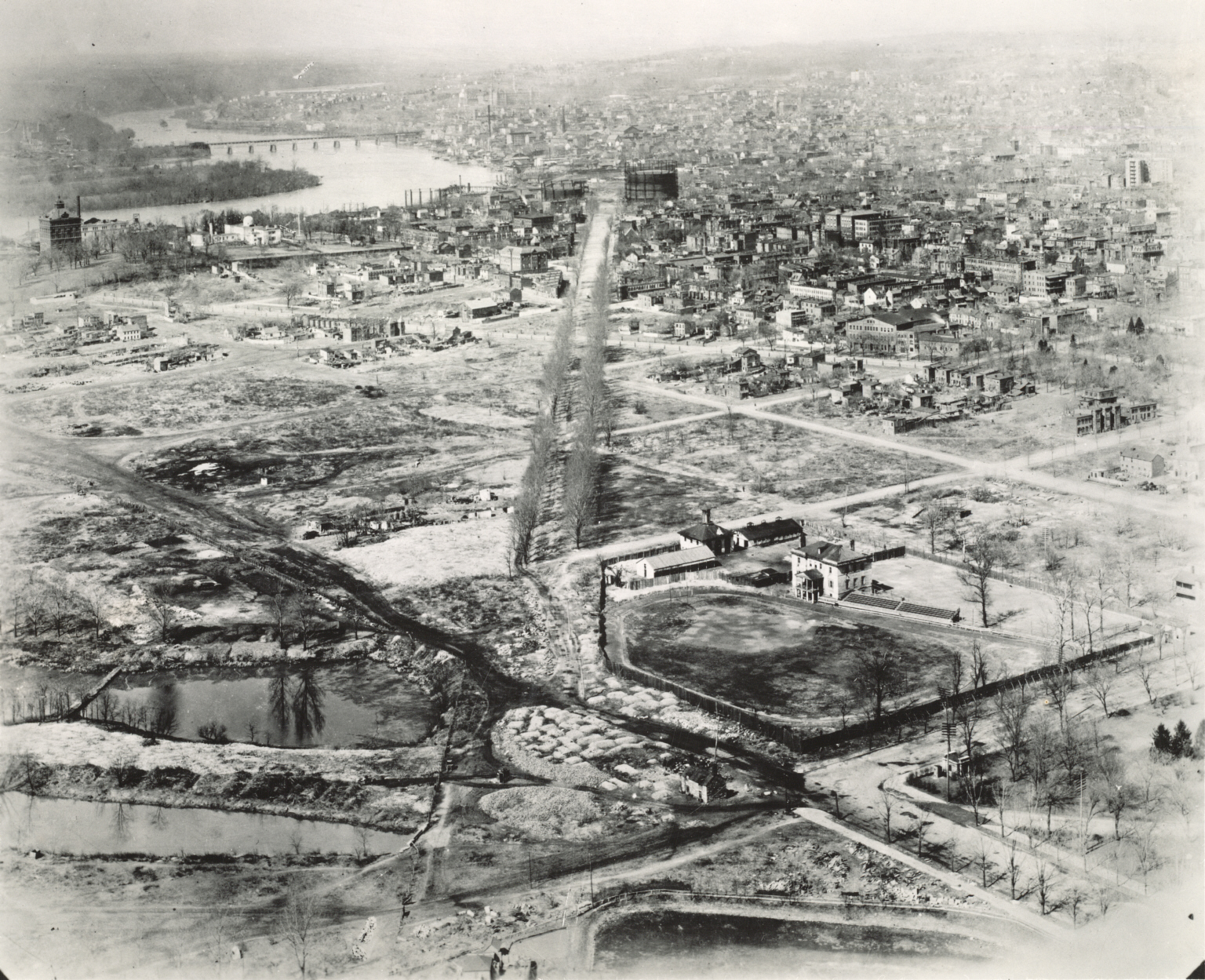
View towards Foggy Bottom from the Washington Monument in 1894. Heurich's Brewery is on the top left. The gas tanks are at the end of Virginia Avenue. In the foreground is the Van Ness Mansion and the Lockkeeper's House.

As Washington's population expanded throughout the latter half of the 19th century, Foggy Bottom became populated with working class German and Irish immigrants, most of whom were employed in nearby factories. Other ethnic groups included Italians and African Americans, the latter of which migrated to Washington in large numbers as freedman following the abolition of slavery. Blocks of simple brick rowhouses were constructed throughout Foggy Bottom to accommodate its increasing population.

The neighborhood's alley dwellings, which housed the community's poorest, first emerged in the 1860s. Consisting of simple two-story brick structures and shanties, these homes lacked basic sanitation and eventually became overcrowded. Alleys were at first home mostly to white laborers; by the 1870s, Washington's alley communities were majority black. Foggy Bottom had nine inhabited alleys by the 1890s, with some, including Snows Court and Hugh's Court, containing hundreds of residents in cramped, slum-like conditions. Community institutions and businesses that emerged to serve Foggy Bottom during this period, which were generally racially and ethnically segregated, included churches such as St. Stephen's Catholic Church and St. Mary's Episcopal Church, schools, hospitals, saloons, and grocery stores. Criminal elements, such as the Irish Round Tops gang that was based in Washington Circle, also operated in the area.

=== Deindustrialization, Prohibition, and arrival of GW ===
1934 map of Washington identifying percentage of non-white occupants by block. Foggy Bottom is visible in the center-left.

Foggy Bottom's deindustrialization began in the early 20th century with the decline of the C&O Canal due to competition from regional railroads as well as reduced coal consumption resulting from the rise of oil and natural gas. Between 1903 and 1939, the number of large industrial companies in Foggy Bottom had dropped from fourteen to five. These were replaced by less labor-intensive businesses, such as warehousing and laundries, as well as non industrial activities along the Potomac waterfront, including equestrian stables. This led to an outmigration of Foggy Bottom's working class communities, which was further enabled by expanding car ownership and suburbanization in the Washington region. Many of Foggy Bottom's black residents, who were among the neighborhood's poorest, remained in the area. At this time, particularly by the 1930s and 1940s, blacks in Washington faced a significant housing shortage due to the city's racially restrictive housing covenants, redlining, and other prevailing Jim Crow policies, which severely limited their housing options; this resulted in the concentration of black people displaced by increasing alley clearances in remaining areas permissible for black residence, causing overcrowding.

Prohibition greatly affected Foggy Bottom's breweries, which for decades had served as major employers in the neighborhood, particularly of its German community. Some unsuccessfully attempted to convert to soft drink production, while Heurich's survived by producing ice and leasing its facilities for storage. None of Foggy Bottom's breweries fully recovered from Prohibition; Heurich's closed by 1960. Prohibition also enabled the emergence of the Warring brother's organized crime syndicate, called the Foggy Bottom Gang in the local press. Headed by Charles "Rags" Warring, Emitt "Little Man" Warring, and Leo Warring, the Foggy Bottom Gang ran bootlegging and illegal gambling operations in Washington and Virginia. Some of the gang's distilling and rum-running, the latter of which was often assigned to black associates given the police's relative lack of interest if they were killed by rival gangs, took place in Foggy Bottom's alley communities. The gang maintained close relationships with local law enforcement that enabled its existence until the Federal Bureau of Investigation began a crackdown on illegal gambling in the 1950s.

In 1912, the George Washington University (GW) began moving to Foggy Bottom when it transferred its Department of Arts and Sciences to 2023 G Street. Its expansion accelerated under the administration of Cloyd H. Marvin, who consolidated GW's campus east of 23rd Street starting in 1927. This area, unlike western Foggy Bottom, had been primarily a residential, upper class community populated with civil servants throughout the 19th century. By the end of Marvin's term in 1959, GW had constructed nine university buildings, including Lisner Auditorium and George Washington University Hospital.

=== Alley clearances ===
Foggy Bottom's inhabited alleys, whose dilapidated state had attracted the attention of reformists since the late 19th century, gradually depopulated as landlords converted them into parking lots and storage space; the total number dropped from a peak of twelve in 1897 to seven in 1927, with population density also falling significantly in historically crowded alleys. Many alley dwellings as well as older blocks of working class rowhouses were also demolished during the 1920s to make way for multi-story apartment buildings, which brought more middle class residents to the neighborhood. Despite this, much of Foggy Bottom, especially its southern section, continued to have poor housing conditions.

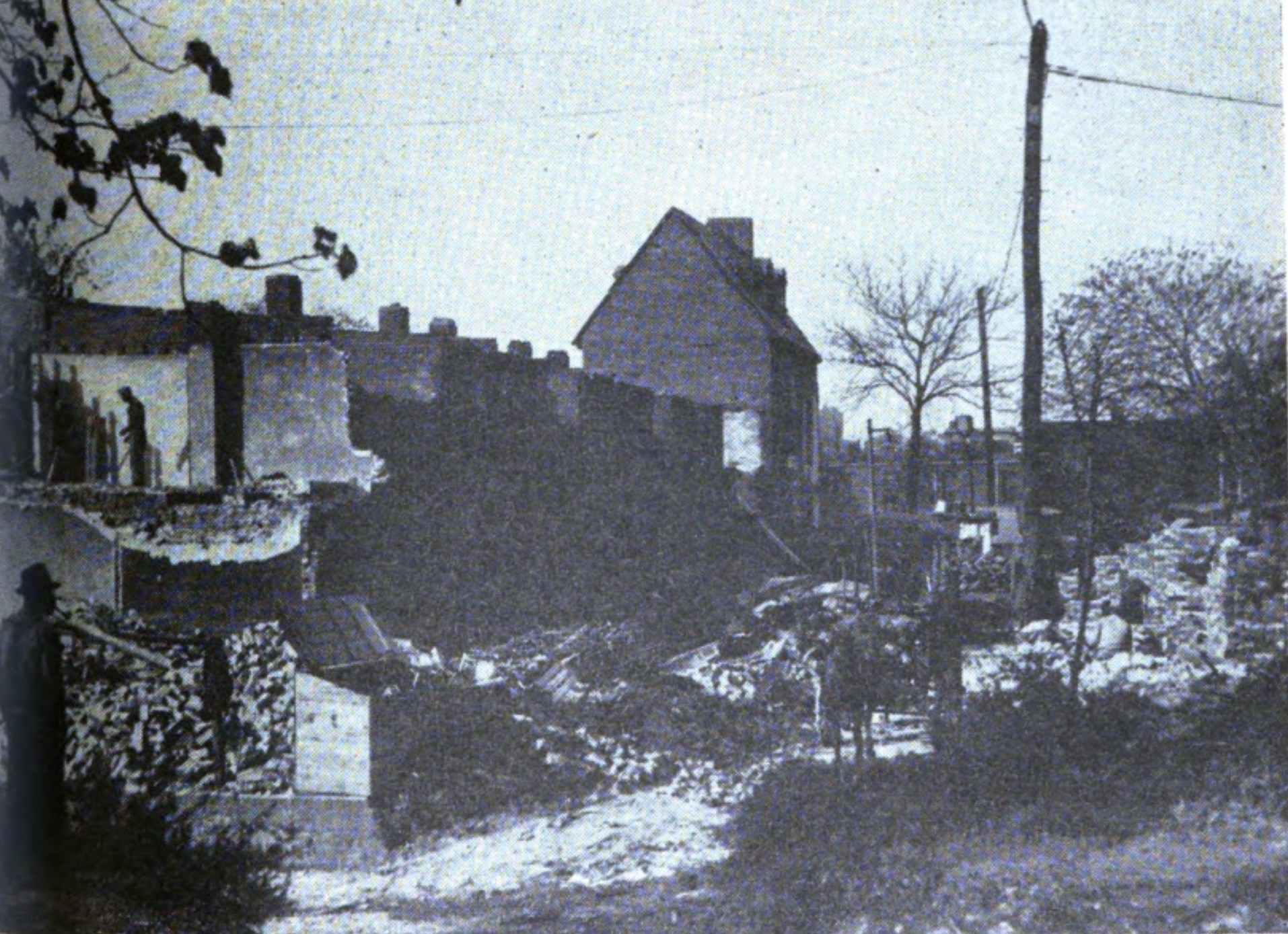
Demolition of O'Brien's Court, which was described by the ADA as one of Foggy Bottom's largest alley communities

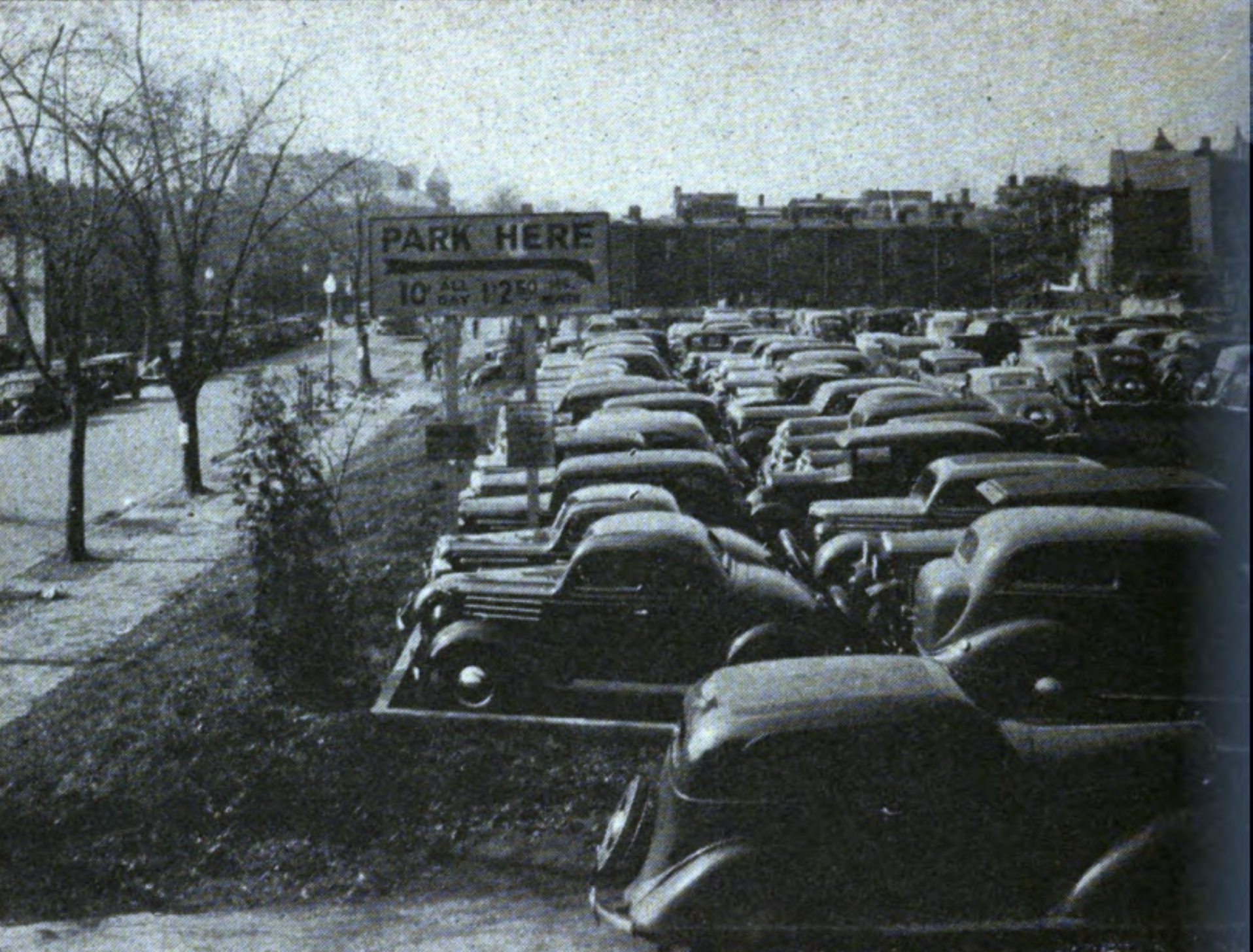
Site of O'Brien's Court after demolition. It served temporarily as a parking lot to prepare for the planned construction of government buildings.

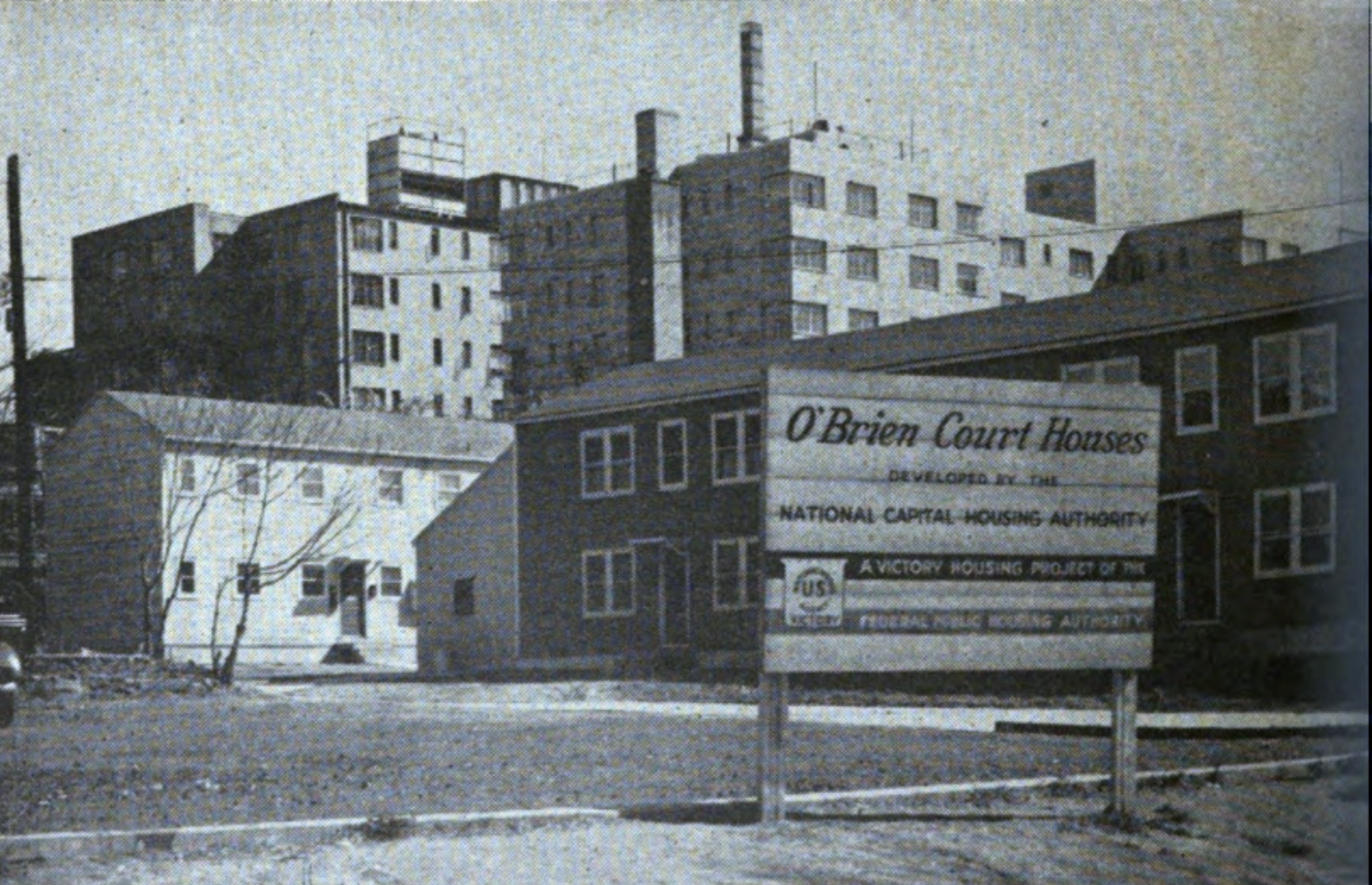
Temporary housing for black war workers during World War II at the site of O'Brien's Court

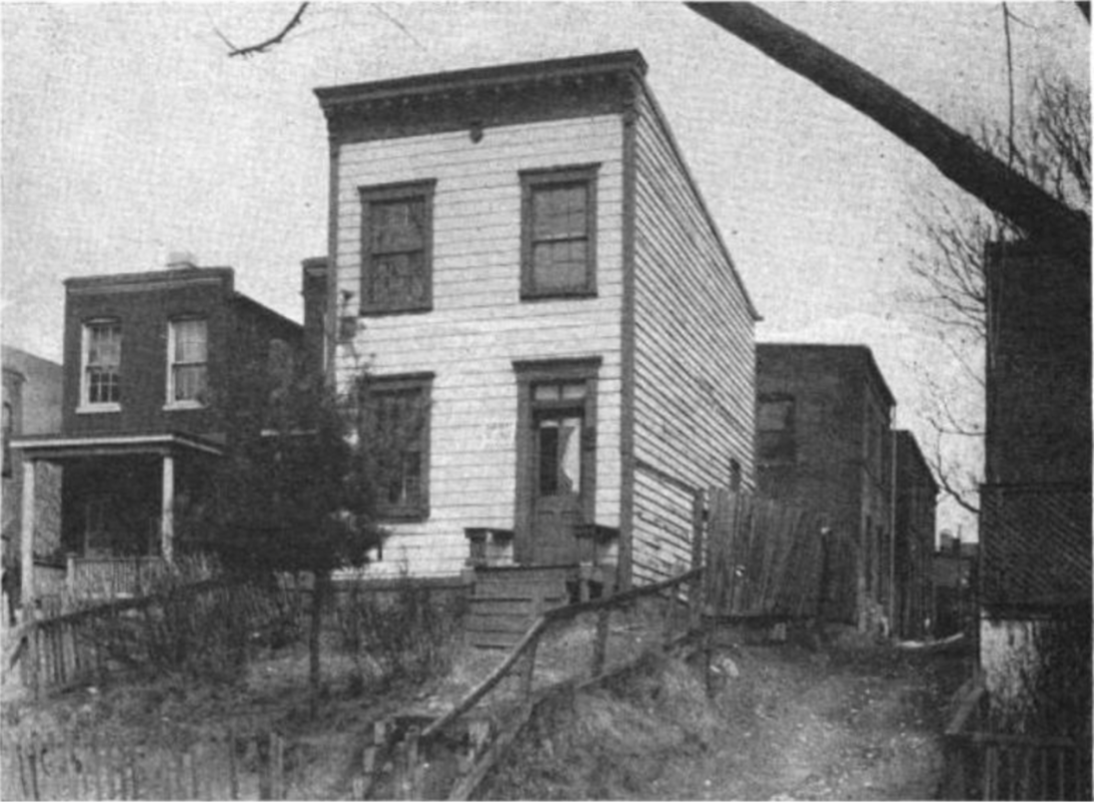
Entrance to Bissells Court, located in the block immediately east of St. Mary's Church

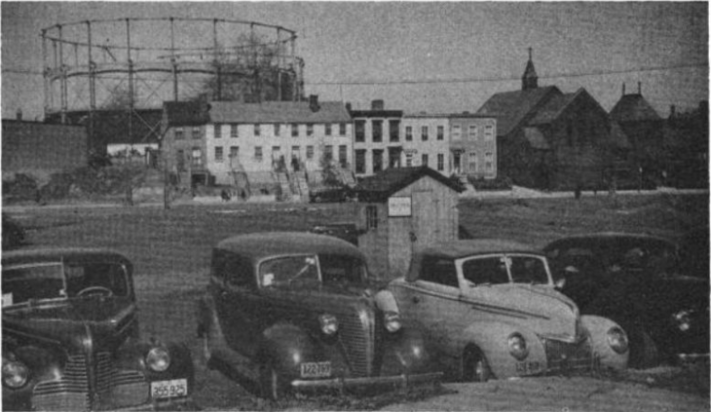
Location of Bissells Court after demolition. The site was sold to GW and temporarily served as parking. St. Mary's Episcopal Church and one of the neighborhood's gas tanks are visible.

During the New Deal era, the Alley Dwelling Authority (ADA) was established with the objective of eliminating all of Washington's inhabited alleys by 1944. Led by John Ihlder, the ADA started demolishing Foggy Bottom's alley dwellings in 1935, beginning with 56 houses in O'Brien's Court that eventually became parking lots. This occurred as Foggy Bottom and its surrounding neighborhoods became increasingly popular among government workers due to its proximity to agencies downtown, which encouraged private redevelopment and housing conversions. ADA alley clearances displaced mainly Foggy Bottom's black residents, leading to the foundation of the Lincoln Civic Association (LCA), which fought with the ADA for new housing for black former alley residents. Other groups that pushed for affordable housing included the Parent-Teacher Association (PTA) at Briggs-Montgomery Elementary, a segregated school for Foggy Bottom's black children, which unsuccessfully attempted to lobby the ADA and First Lady Eleanor Roosevelt for low-income housing for Green's Court residents in 1939.

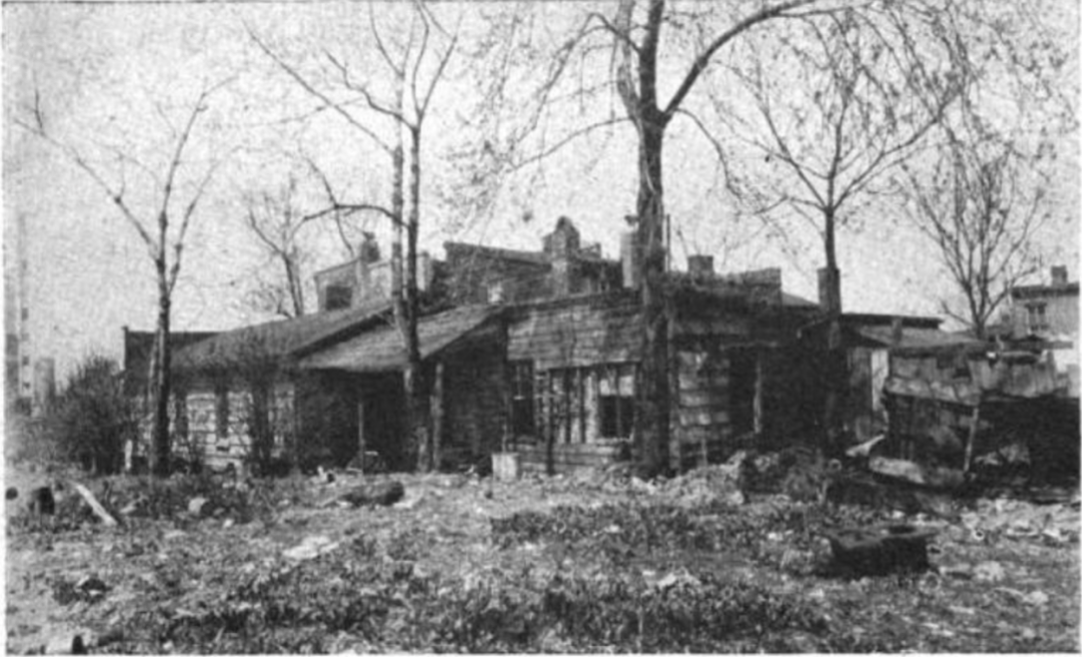
St. Mary's Court prior to demolition. The structure depicted was used as a bakery by Union soldiers during the Civil War, and at the time of acquisition by the ADA was occupied as a dwelling.

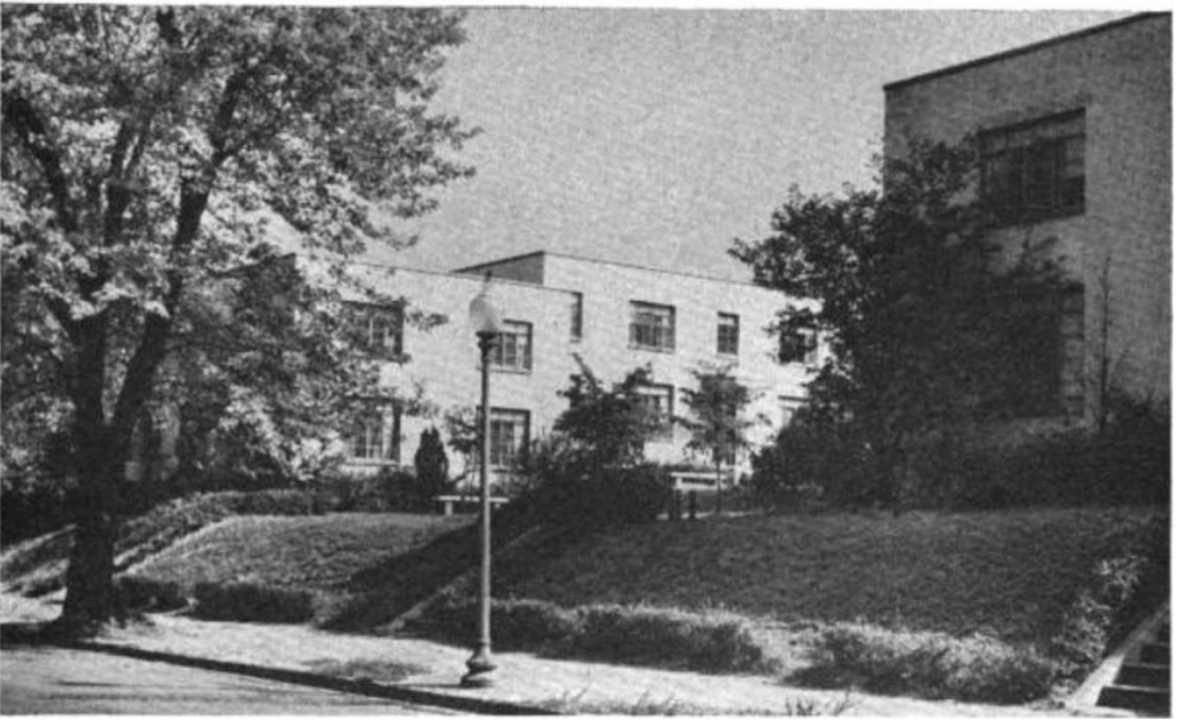
St. Mary's Court Apartments following their completion in the late 1930s. It contained 24 units, and was eventually demolished in the 1970s due to prohibitive maintenance costs.

In 1937, the ADA's plans to replace alley dwellings in Saint Mary's Court with a 24-unit public housing property for blacks instigated significant pushback from Foggy Bottom's white residents and civic associations, who believed the project's retaining of black residents would "retard progress" towards the neighborhood's revitalization. This led to a counter reaction from the LCA and the local black press, which continued to push for replacement housing. While ADA eventually completed the project at Saint Mary's Court as originally planned despite resistance from whites, this did not satisfy the LCA, which argued that the ADA's activities in Foggy Bottom and elsewhere in Washington had not adequately rehoused alley dwellers.

Compounding the issue was the fact that the land the ADA purchased or received as a part of alley clearance efforts was often too expensive to support low-income public housing; this was made worse by the increases in land values and rents throughout Washington driven by New Deal government expansion. Consequently, the ADA rarely providing housing for alley dwellers, instead converting Foggy Bottom's alley areas into commercial use. Despite the ADA's activities in the neighborhood, by 1950, Foggy Bottom was a majority black community. Many areas of the neighborhood were recorded in 1944 as continuing to lack running water, modern sewage facilities, and electricity.

=== Urban renewal and transit construction ===
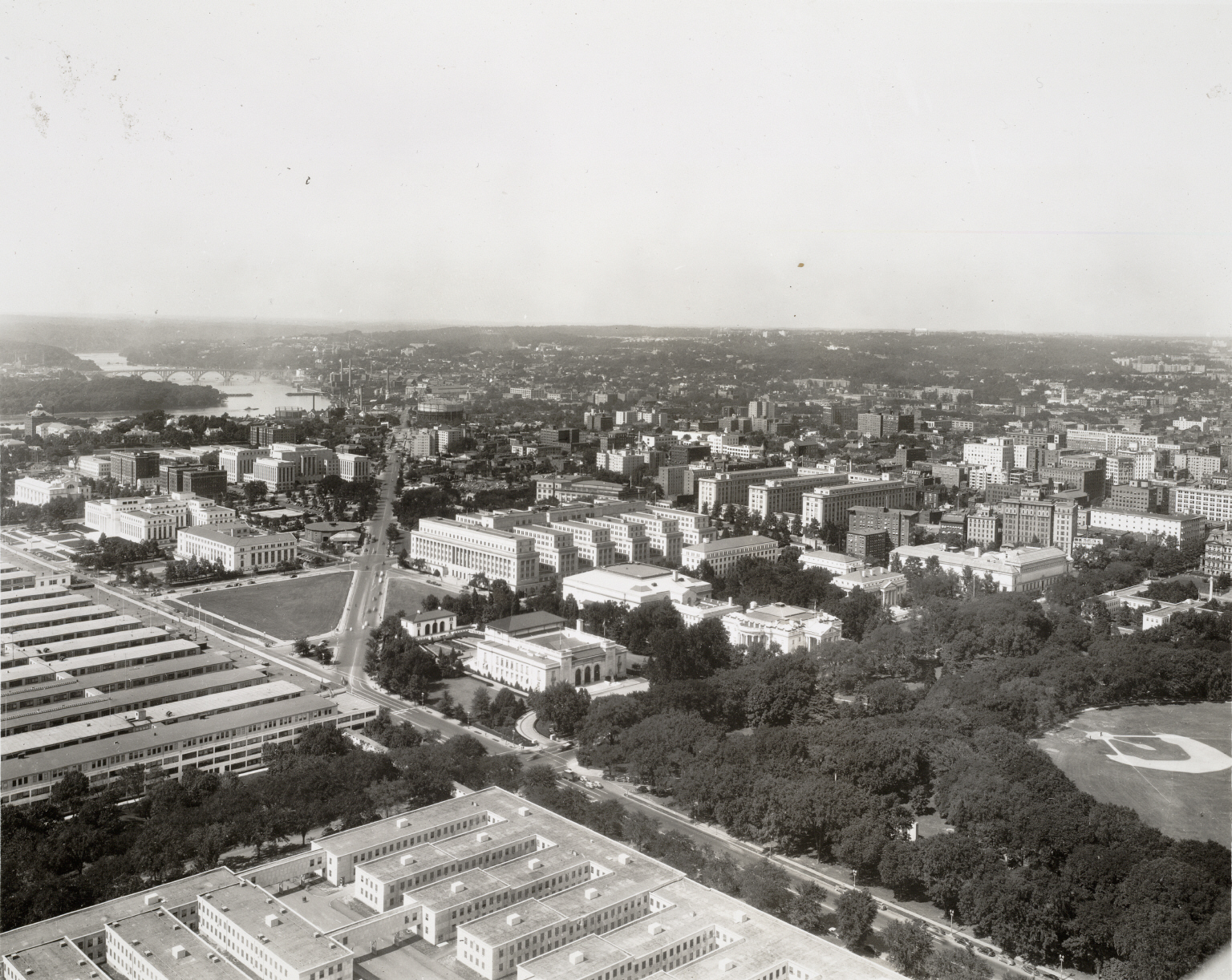
1942 view of Foggy Bottom from the Washington Monument, illustrating the construction of various government offices and apartment buildings. Heurich's brewery and the gas tanks are still visible.

Foggy Bottom's shift towards urban renewal began in 1947 with the construction of the United States Department of State headquarters and Washington Gas Light Company's dismantling of its facilities, which was completed in 1954. This encouraged large scale transformation of Foggy Bottom's formerly industrial areas, as well as small-scale renovations of alley dwellings. Neighborhoods associations, developers, and federal urban renewal agencies all conceived competing visions for Foggy Bottom's redevelopment; this was in parallel with plans for the Inner Loop highway that would run through the area.

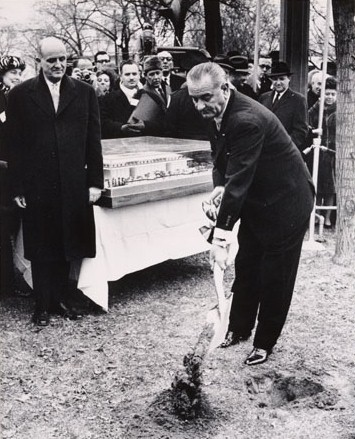
President Lyndon B. Johnson at the groundbreaking of the Kennedy Center, 1964

In 1950, the National Capital Planning Commission (NCPC), as a part of its Comprehensive Plan for Washington, identified parts of Foggy Bottom as being "blighted or obsolete" based on a 1940 assessment of the neighborhood's housing conditions; by 1955, it was designated for future urban renewal projects, which made properties eligible for federal mortgage insurance and enabled the government to more easily pursue eminent domain. The NCPC, groups representing renovators and private developers, GW, and those opposed to government-sponsored urban renewal then proceeded with negotiating the terms and area of the planned renewal initiative. Opposition to urban renewal focused on the potential for wholesale demolition based on what was then underway in Southwest Washington. Government planners eventually relented, and by 1957 the NCPC had shelved the initiative, as by that point private renovation and development had ameliorated much of Foggy Bottom's blighted conditions the NCPC had used to justify the 1950 urban renewal designation. By 1960, Foggy Bottom had transformed into a largely white, middle-income neighborhood, with its black population displaced due to the clearing of low-income areas and rising property values resulting from private investment and home renovations.

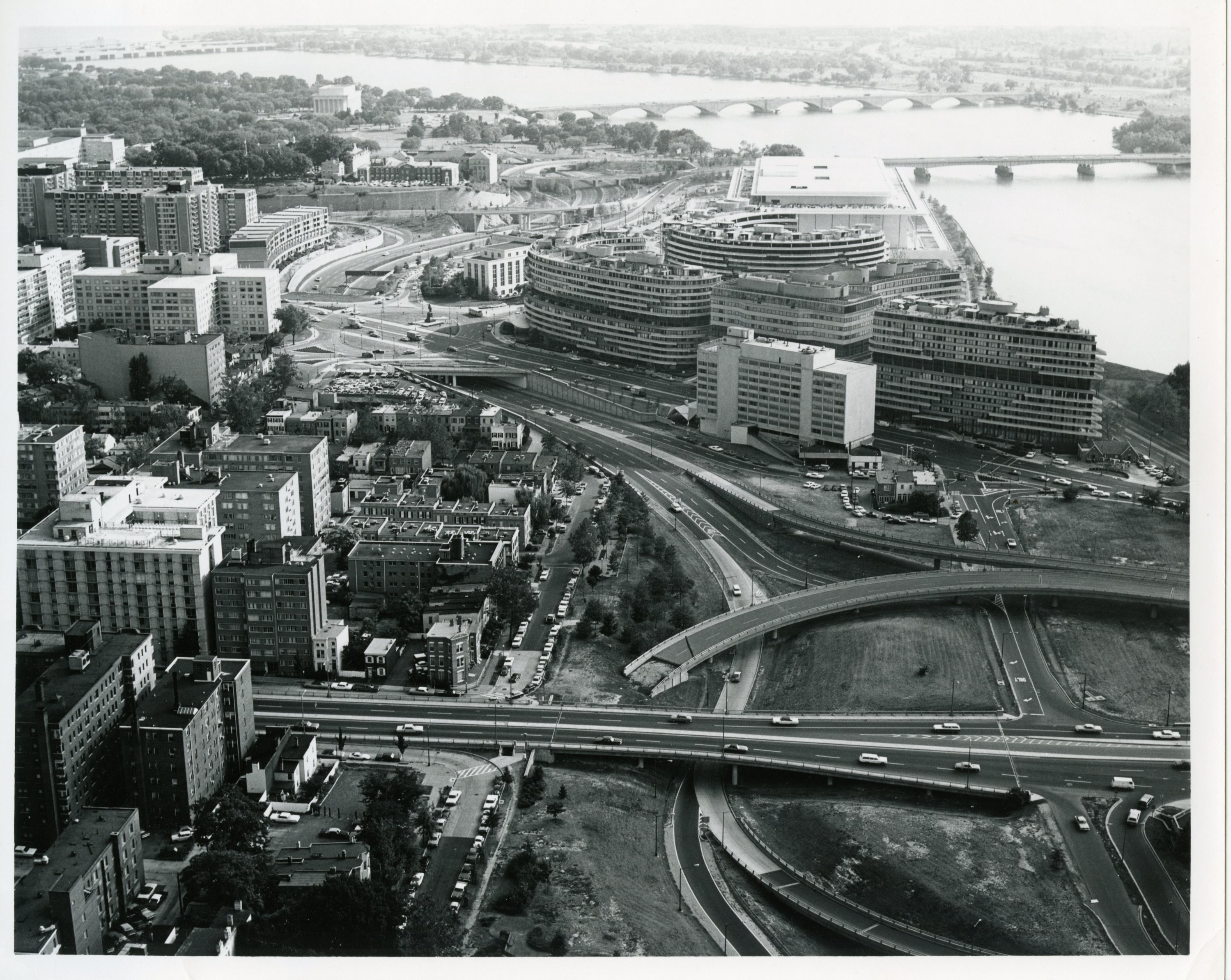
Potomac River Freeway section of the Inner Loop near completion in the 1970s. The Watergate, Kennedy Center, and Columbia Plaza are visible.

While the original NCPC urban renewal plans were not pursued, the Columbia Plaza development in Foggy Bottom's did receive assistance from federal programs and represents the only finished urban renewal project in the neighborhood. The building elicited significant controversy from residents, who were completely displaced following Columbia Plaza's completion, and Congress; the development was planned and constructed during the emergence of broader political opposition to urban renewal. Despite investigations into the financing of the project by a Congressional subcommittee led by Democratic Representative John Dowdy, construction proceeded in 1965 and was completed in 1975. Other major sites built during this period include the Watergate complex on the land of the old gas tanks and the Kennedy Center.

The Inner Loop, which was expected to be a major thoroughfare as a part of the 1950s car-centric vision for Washington's transit system, was originally set to follow 25th Street between the Arlington Memorial Bridge and M Street. The planned construction of the Potomac Plaza apartment complex and the Kennedy Center, as well as the reduction of urban decay in Foggy Bottom, forced planners to alter the freeway's route; this resulted in the demolition of much of Foggy Bottom's western section in 1961 to make way for what has become the E Street Expressway segment of Interstate 66. Landmarks including the Heurich Brewery, which then housed the Arena Stage, were also torn down during the construction of the Theodore Roosevelt Bridge, which was finished in 1964 and connects to the Expressway.

=== GW expansion and historic preservation ===
Foggy Bottom underwent significant redevelopment into the second half of the 20th century, driven in part by GW's expansion; the university had become a major landowner in the neighborhood through the acquisition of residential and commercial property. This caused an increase in housing costs and a reduction in the number of Foggy Bottom's residents; between 1970 and 1984, Foggy Bottom's residential population declined from 14,500 to 9,100. Continued development pressure inspired neighborhood associations to explore forming a historic district that would protect Foggy Bottom's remaining historic architecture. This was eventually achieved in 1987, when the National Register for Historic Places (NRHP) designated the area bounded by New Hampshire Avenue, Washington Circle, 24th, 26th, and H Streets as the Foggy Bottom Historic District. Preservationists, as well as GW students, confronted GW over the planned demolitions of Red Lion Row along I Street and the Lenthall Houses; the former was partially retained via a facadist arrangement, and the latter was moved from 19th Street to 21st Street to make way for the World Bank headquarters.

Foggy Bottom's revitalization has continued into the 21st century, with blocks formerly occupied by parking lots replaced with mixed-use buildings; this has contributed to greater walkability, as well as rising costs of living and gentrification. GW continued expanding aggressively between 1988 and 2007 under university president Stephen Joel Trachtenberg. Negotiations between the city government, neighborhood organizations, and GW resulted in the university's 2007 Campus Plan, which facilitated the listing of the George Washington University-Old West End Historic District by the NRHP on January 27, 2015.

== Geography ==
Foggy Bottom is located within Washington's second ward in the city's Northwest quadrant. It is surrounded by the neighborhoods of Georgetown, West End, and Downtown Washington. The National Mall borders it to the south, while the Potomac River runs along its western shore. Rock Creek runs between Foggy Bottom and Georgetown, and its confluence with the Potomac is located in Foggy Bottom's northeast section near Virginia Avenue. Foggy Bottom's urban landscape consists of large office buildings, apartments, and historic rowhouses. The GW campus occupies an area of around 43 acres with over 100 buildings. Interstate 66, Rock Creek Parkway, and Whitehurst Freeway run through large parts of its western area along the shore of the Potomac.

== Economy ==
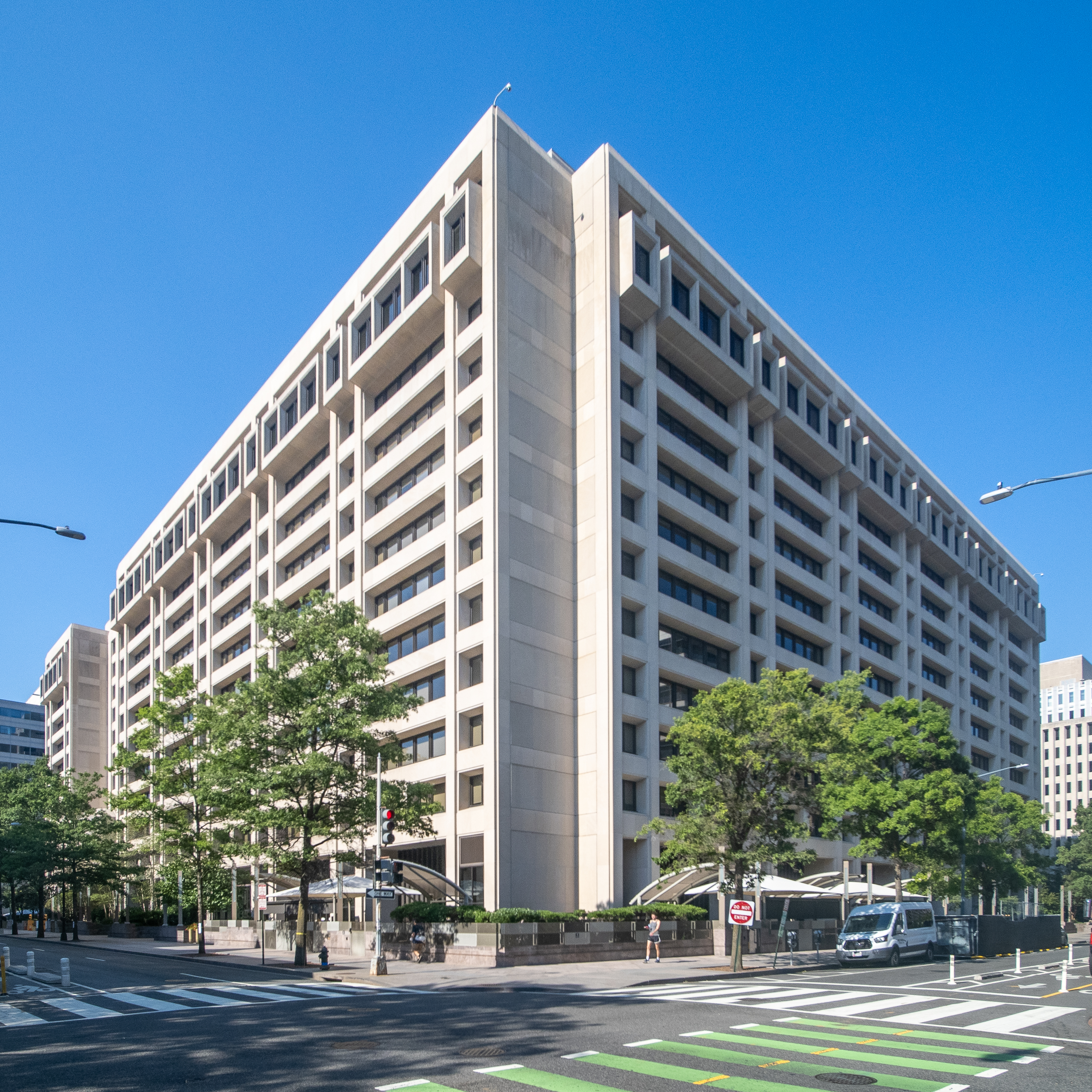
IMF headquarters on 19th Street

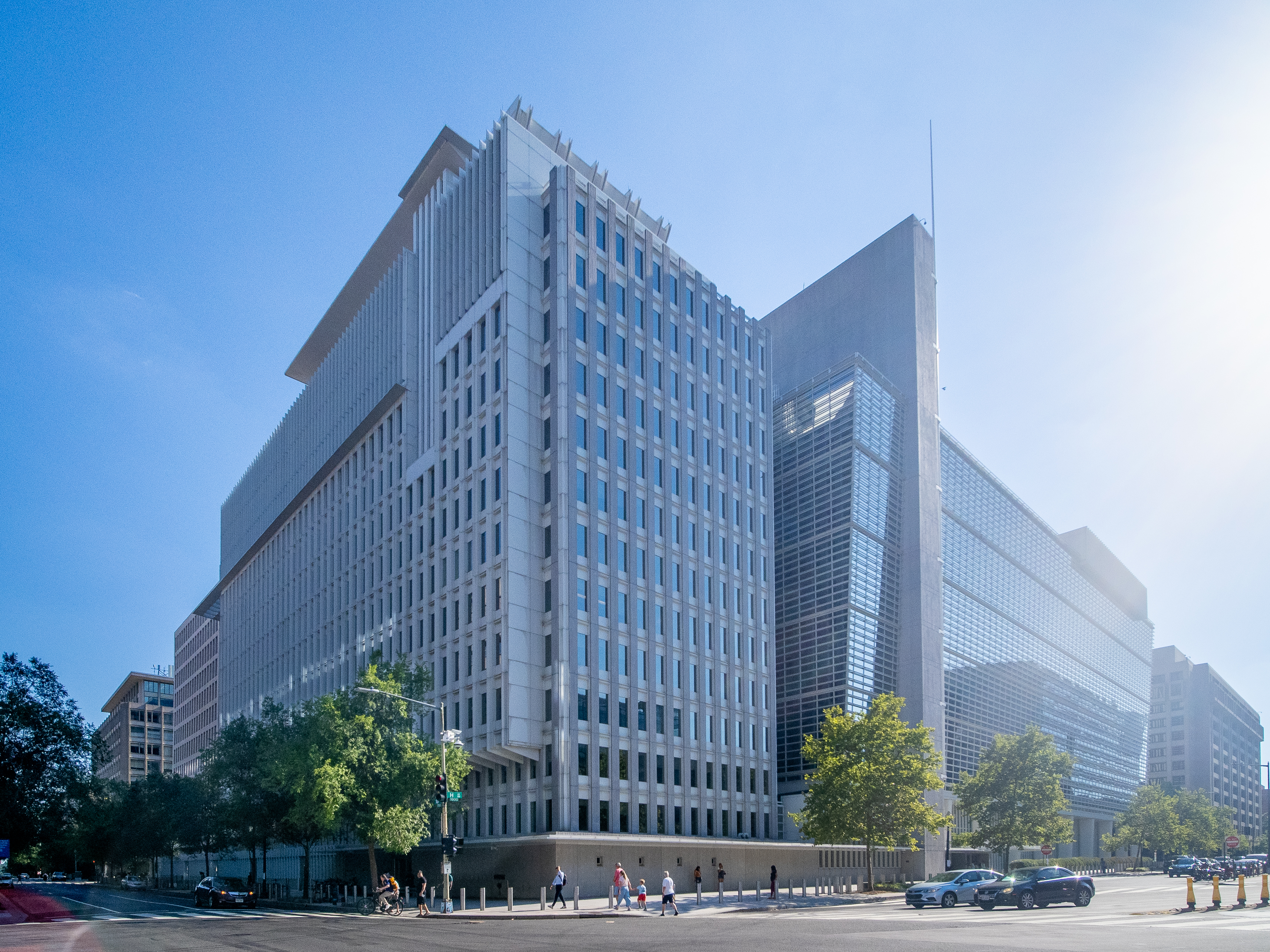
World Bank headquarters on H Street

Foggy Bottom is part of Washington's central business district and is home to the headquarters of various international organizations and US government agencies, including the World Bank, International Monetary Fund, the United States Department of State, the General Services Administration, and the United States Department of the Interior. Several embassies, including those of Saudi Arabia and Bosnia and Herzegovina, are located in the neighborhood. Foggy Bottom is also has the headquarters of non-profits such as the American Red Cross.

GW, whose campus occupies much of Foggy Bottom, has a student population of around 25,400. Many restaurants, bars, and other retail businesses serve these students as well as Foggy Bottom's office workers. Over 8,000 staff are employed by the university; its economic activity added an estimated $1.6 billion in income to Washington in the fiscal year 2019–2020, representing about 1.2% of the city's total GDP. GW also continues to drive the Foggy Bottom's redevelopment via mixed-use and commercial real estate projects.

== Culture ==
=== Events ===
Foggy Bottom has had a Farmers' market on I Street between 23rd and 24th Streets on Wednesdays since 2005. The Foggy Bottom Association, a neighborhood association formed in 1955, organizes block parties, walking tours of historic Foggy Bottom, and other annual events. Since 2008, the Arts in Foggy Bottom organization has operated an award-winning biannual arts exhibit featuring outdoor sculptures, performance art, murals, and other mediums.

=== Attractions ===
Corcoran Gallery of Art

Foggy Bottom's museums include the George Washington University Museum and Textile Museum, which exhibits historical prints illustrating the history of Washington from the collection of Albert H. Small and a global collection of textiles established by George Hewitt Myers in 1925. The museum moved from its original location in Kalorama to 21st Street in 2015. The Art Museum of the Americas, which is run by the Organization of American States, features modern and contemporary art from throughout the Western Hemisphere. GW also operates the Luther W. Brady Gallery, an art gallery hosted in the historic Corcoran Gallery building. Theaters and concert venues in Foggy Bottom include the Lisner Auditorium, DAR Constitution Hall, and the Kennedy Center for Performing Arts. The Kennedy Center, in particular, host many concerts, plays, and other performances and attracts millions of visitors annually.

== Historic districts ==
=== Foggy Bottom Historic District ===
- Foggy Bottom Historic District
- U.S. National Register of Historic Places
- U.S. Historic district
- Location: Bounded by New Hampshire Ave., Twenty-fourth, Twenty-sixth, H, and K Sts., NW
- Area: 3 acres (1.2 ha)
- Built: 1870-1911
- Architect: Grimm, Norman; McCartney, Peter; Beers, A.H.
- Architectural style: Late Victorian
- NRHP reference No.: 87001269
- Added to NRHP: October 14, 1987

The Foggy Bottom Historic District covers an area of around 3 acres and is bounded by K Street, New Hampshire Avenue, 24th Street, and 26th Street. Containing 135 contributing structures, the district is primarily residential with a low urban scale; a majority of structures are 2 or 3 stories. Its architecture originates in Foggy Bottom's industrial period between the mid-19th and early 20th centuries. Most buildings are vernacular, brick rowhouses built to house working class labor; ornamentation is generally modest, and facades are flat-fronted. Some properties exhibit greater detail; the group of 16 homes at the corner of 25th Street and New Hampshire Avenue, built together in 1890, demonstrate references to various European styles. Many homes were designed and constructed by locals including Irish immigrant Peter McCartney.

The district also contains some of Washington's surviving historic alley dwellings from the late 19th century. Snow's Court has several rows of brick alley houses dating from the 1880s, as well as a 3-story former livery stable. Hughes Mews retains portions of originally larger alley terraces. The dwellings in both alleys are simple, 2-story brick homes; each unit is 2 bays wide with raised basements. Ornamentation is limited to corbelled brick cornices and arched windows. Snow's Court's stable, built in 1914 by businessman Wilber Nash and designed by Thomas M. Medford, was used by the United States Department of Commerce between 1915 and 1919; since 1940 it has served as a warehouse.

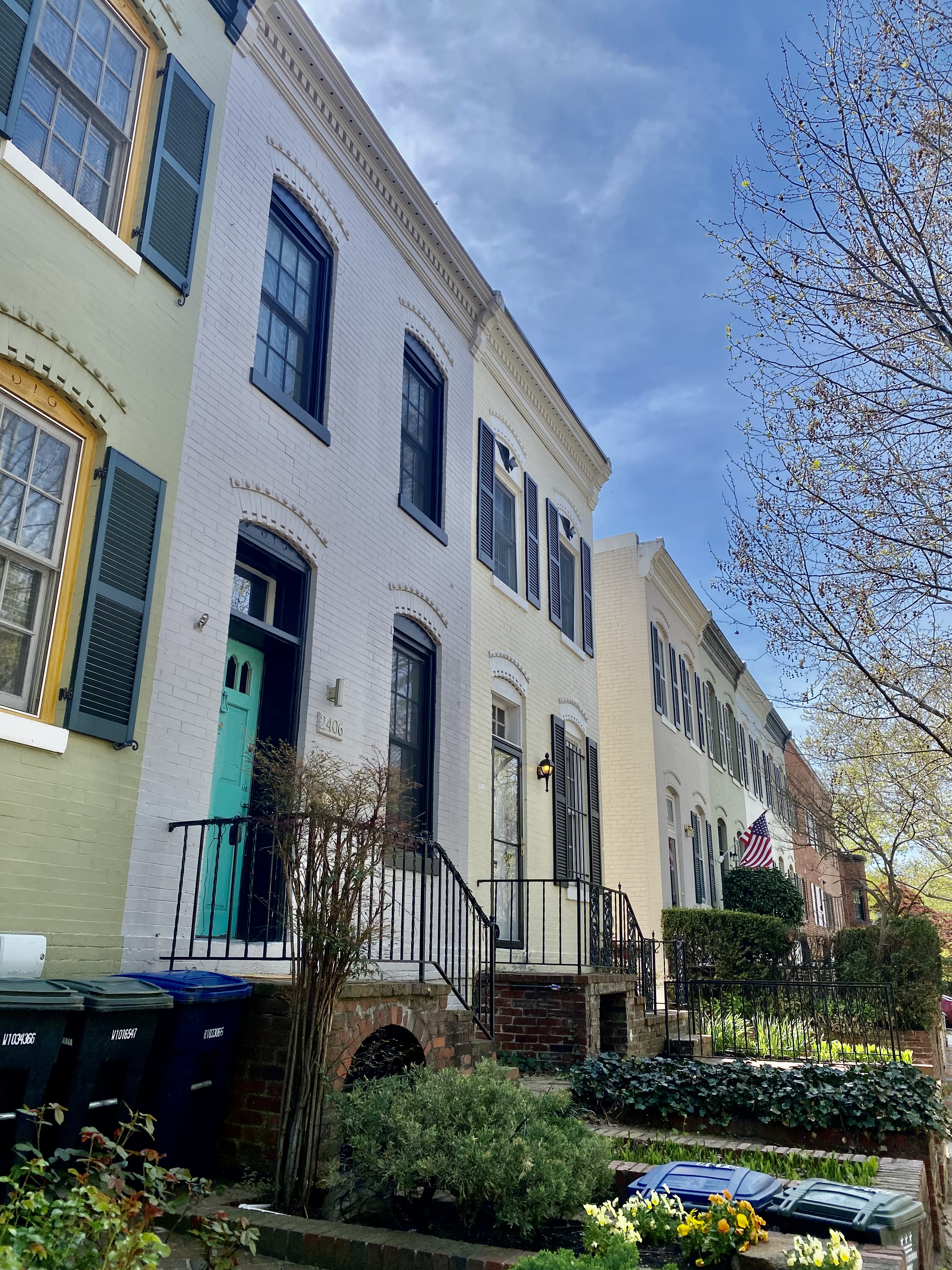
Rowhouses along I Street, c. 1886

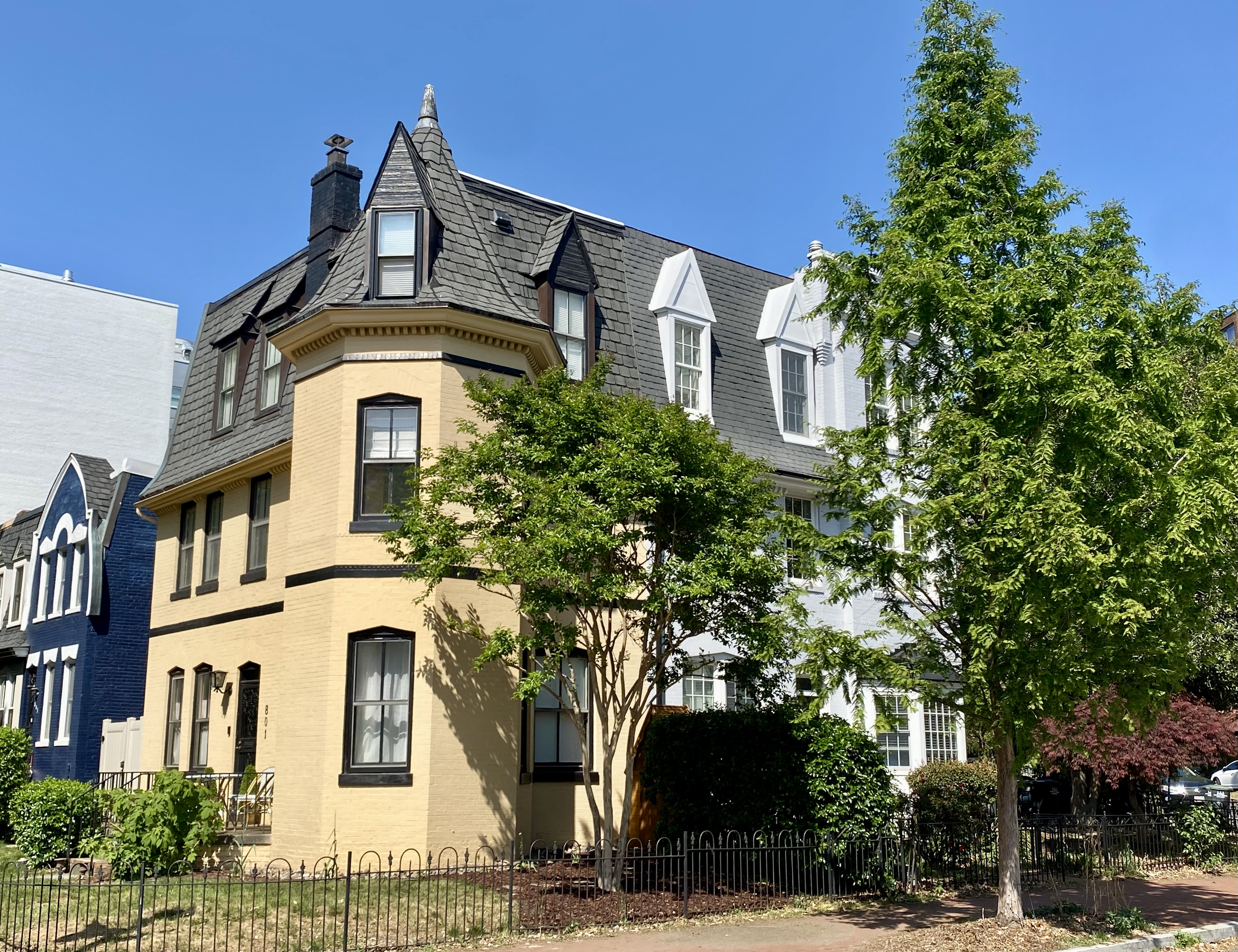
Rowhouses at the corner of 25th Street and New Hampshire Avenue, c. 1890

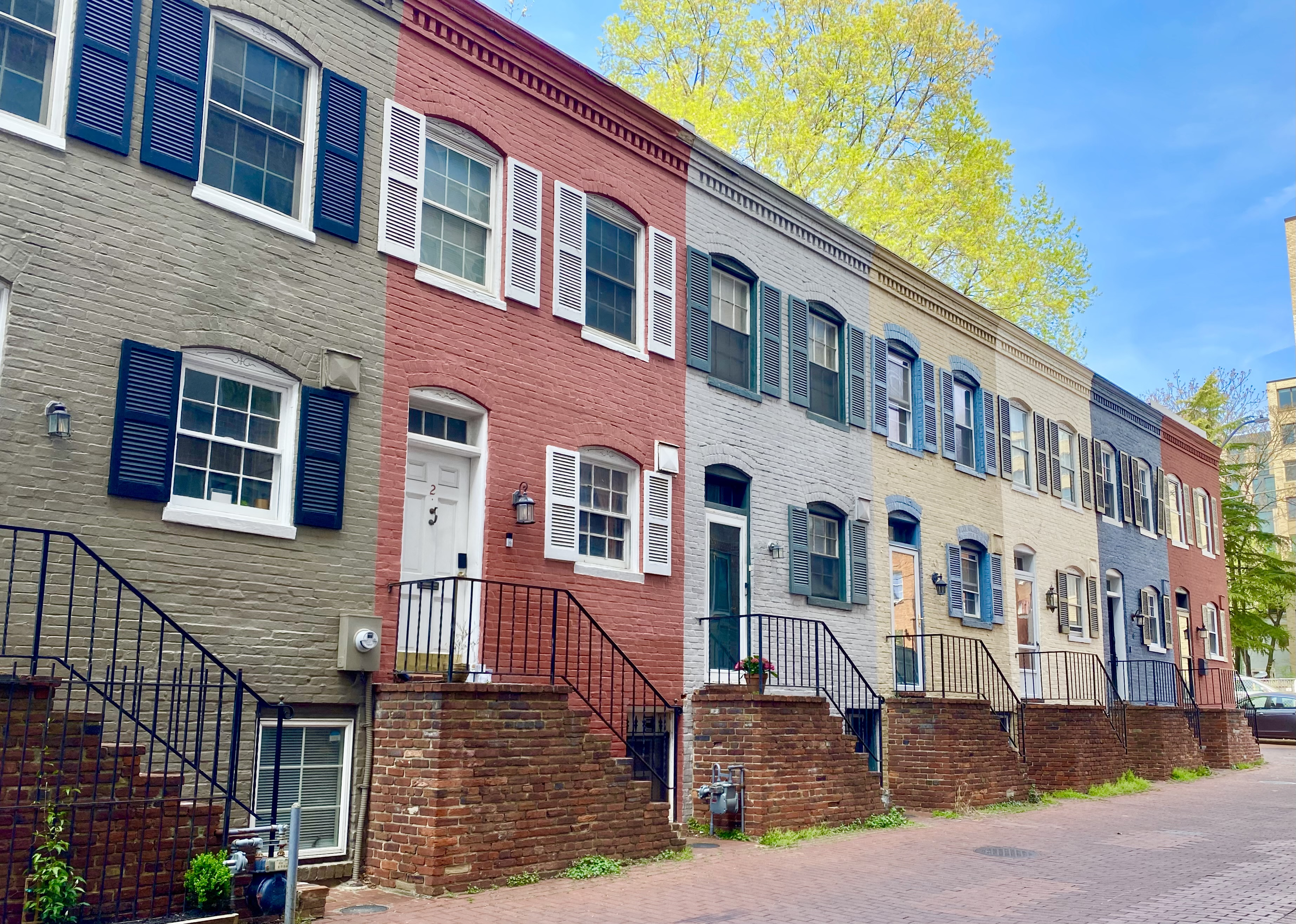
Alley dwellings at entrance to Snow's Court, c. 1890

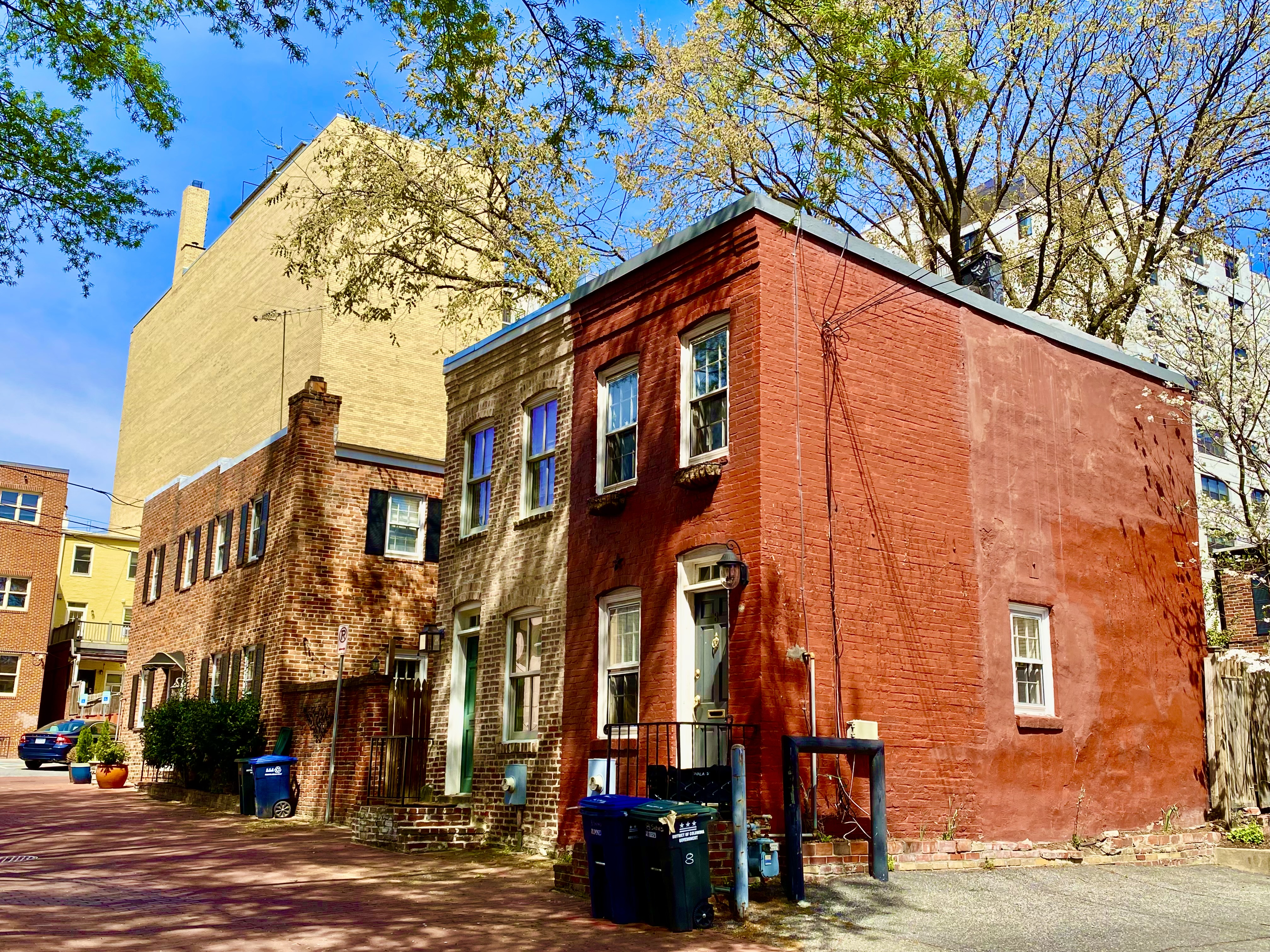
Alley dwellings within Snow's Court, c. 1884

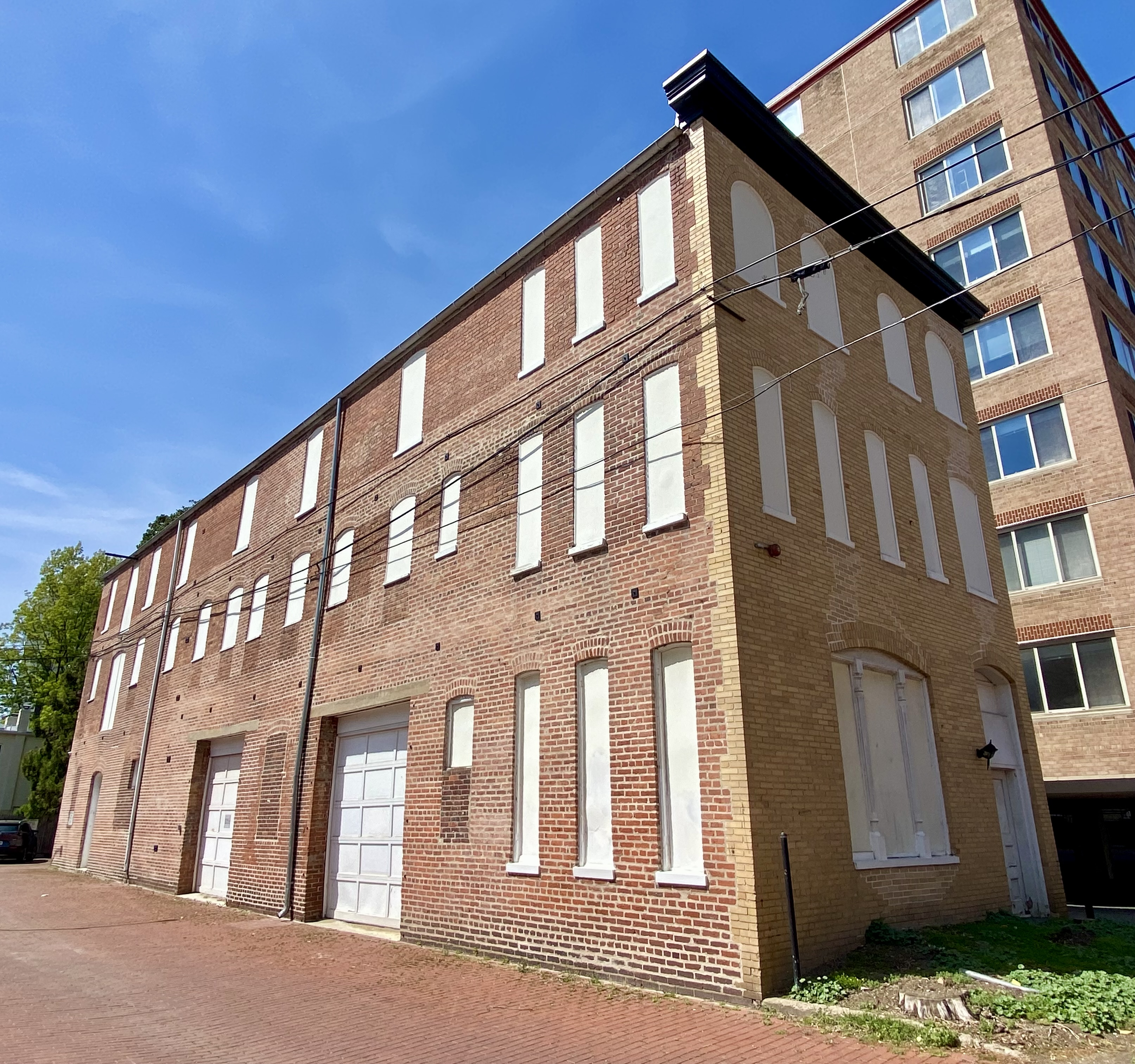
Livery stables, c. 1914

=== George Washington University-Old West End Historic District ===
- George Washington University-Old West End Historic District
- U.S. National Register of Historic Places
- U.S. Historic district
- Location: Between F, I, 19th & 23rd Sts., NW. & Virginia Ave., NW
- Area: 34.5 acres (14.0 ha)
- Built: 1800-1951
- Architect: Albert Harris; Arthur B. Heaton; Waldron Faulkner
- Architectural style: Federal; Greek Revival; Italianate; Second Empire; Queen Anne; Romanesque; Colonial Revival; Classical Revival; Tudor Revival; Moderne; Art Deco; Mid-century Modern
- NRHP reference No.: 14001207
- Added to NRHP: January 27, 2015

The George Washington University-Old West End Historic District encompasses the historic core of GW's Foggy Bottom campus. Consisting of 116 contributing buildings and 3 contributing sites, the district's architecture dates from Foggy Bottom's beginnings in the early 19th century, when the area was populated with free-standing, fashionable residences, through to GW's initial expansion into Foggy Bottom in the first half of the 20th century.

The oldest residential buildings include the Federal Cleveland Abbe House as well as several Greek Revival homes dating between 1849 and 1860. Post-Civil War Victorian rowhouses in the district exhibit a variety of styles such as Flemish Revival, Georgian Revival, and Arts and Crafts. Early to mid-20th century apartment buildings have Classical Revival, Art Deco, and Art Moderne detailing. One of the district's largest, Park Central on 1900 F Street, was designed and built by Harvey H. Warwick in 1928 for Morris Cafritz; it has since been converted into GW's Thurston Hall dormitory. Surviving buildings constructed to serve the district's residents in the 19th and early 20th century include Engine Company 23, the Grant School, as well as several churches.

GW's early campus architecture is centered around a quadrangle per the university's first master plan designed by Albert L. Harris and Arthur B. Heaton in the 1920s. This includes the Georgian Revival Stockton and Corcoran Halls, which were both completed between 1924 and 1925, as well as the more Modernist Stuart and Bell Halls. Buildings dating from the Marvin presidency, many designed by Waldron Faulkner and built by Charles Hook Tompkins between the late 1930s and 1950s, include Lisner Auditorium, Lisner Hall, and James Monroe Hall. These structures, which exhibit styles such as Stripped Classicism, Art Deco, and Art Moderne, are generally large and institutional in form and have little ornamentation.

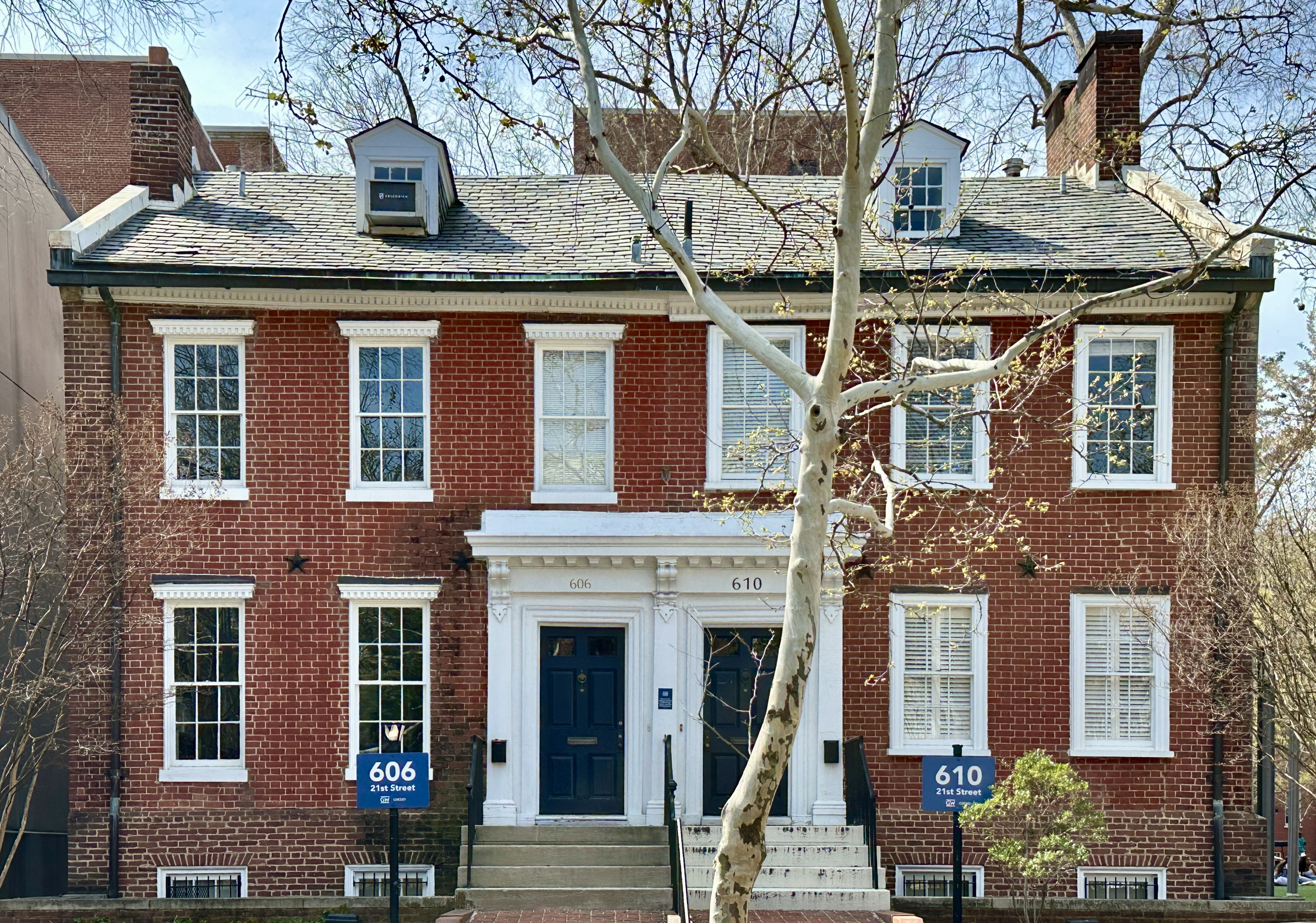
Lenthall Houses, c. 1800. Originally located on 19th Street and moved to their current location on 21st Street in 1978

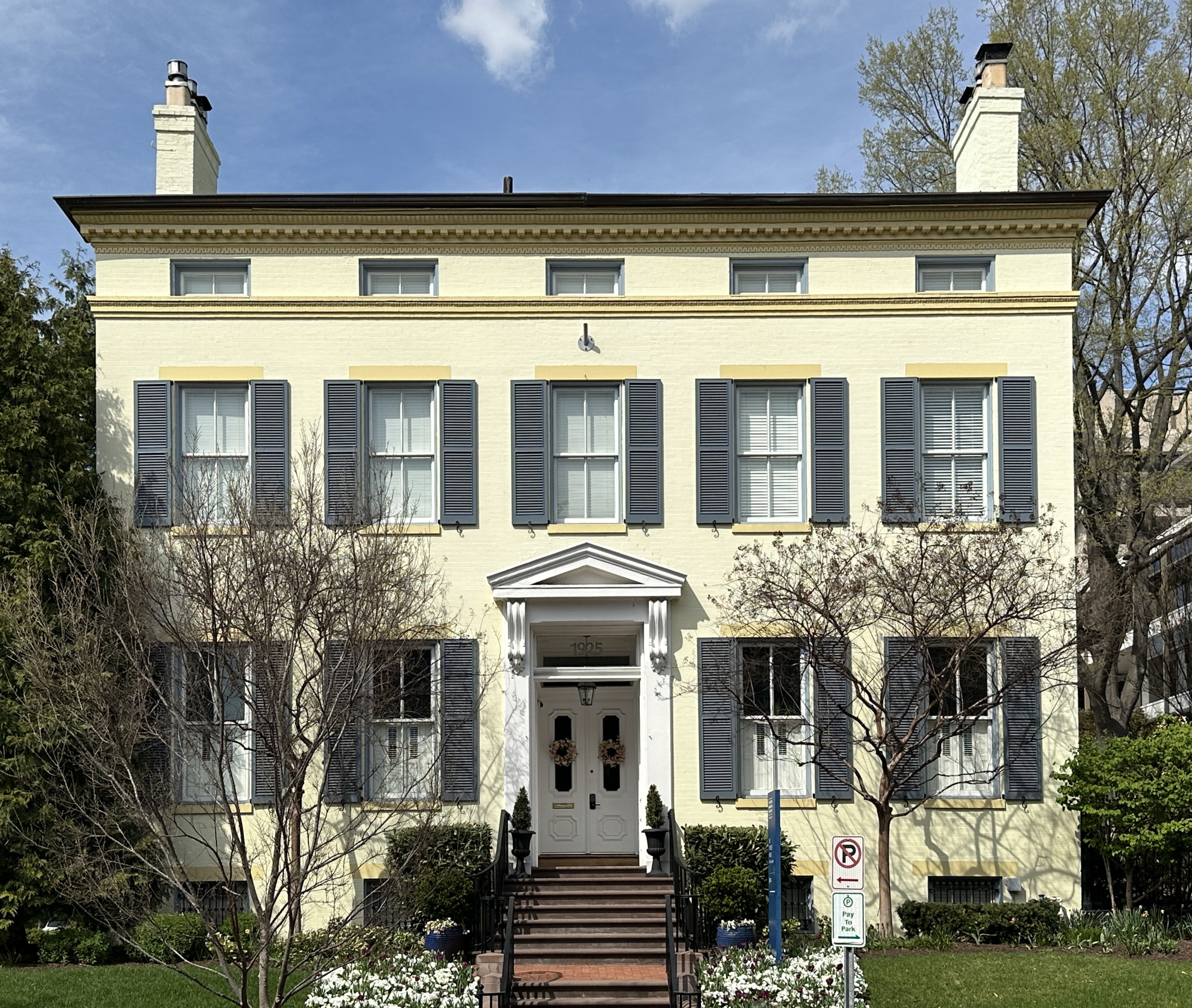
F Street House, c. 1849

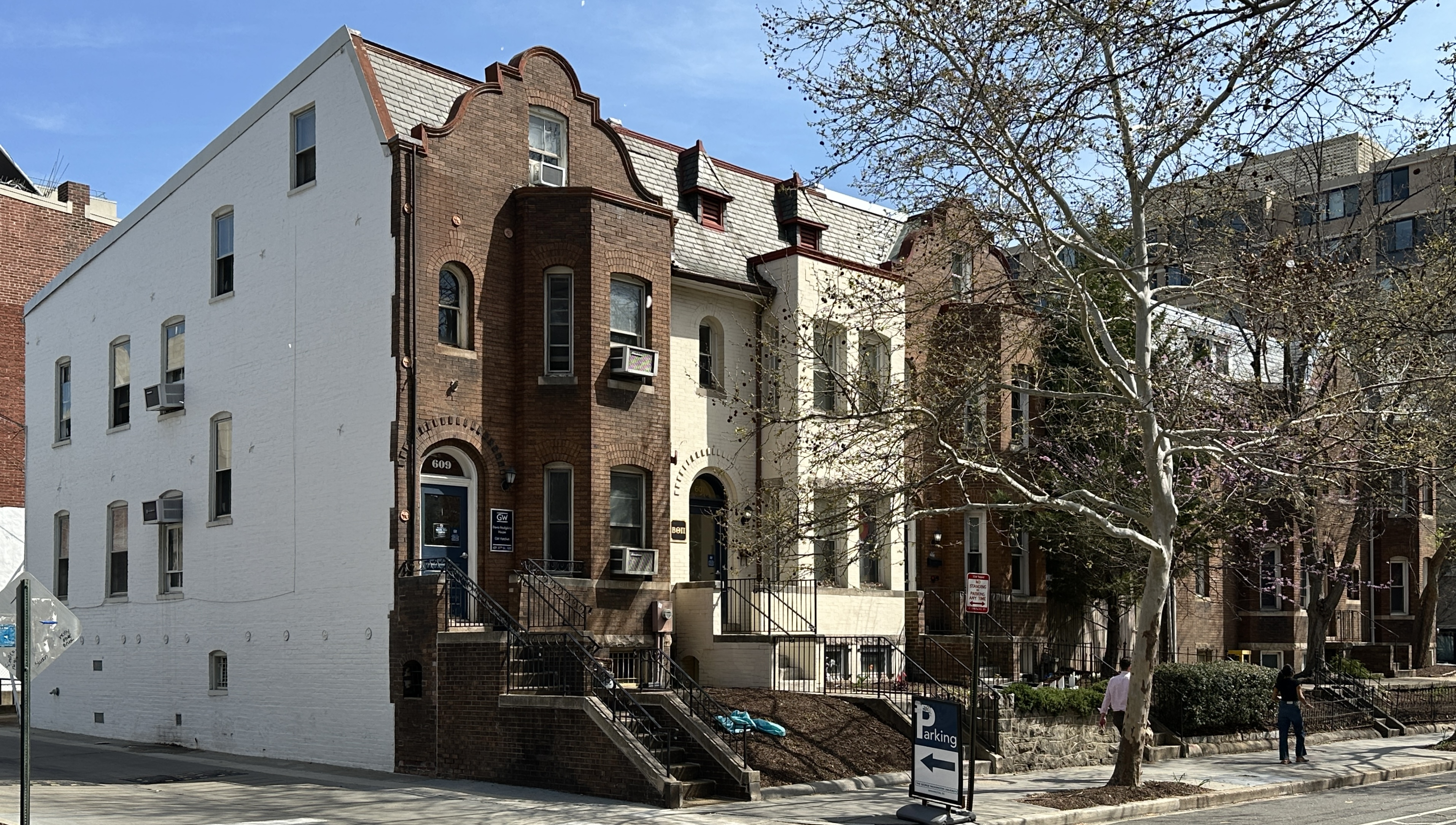
Rowhouses on 21st Street, c. 1897

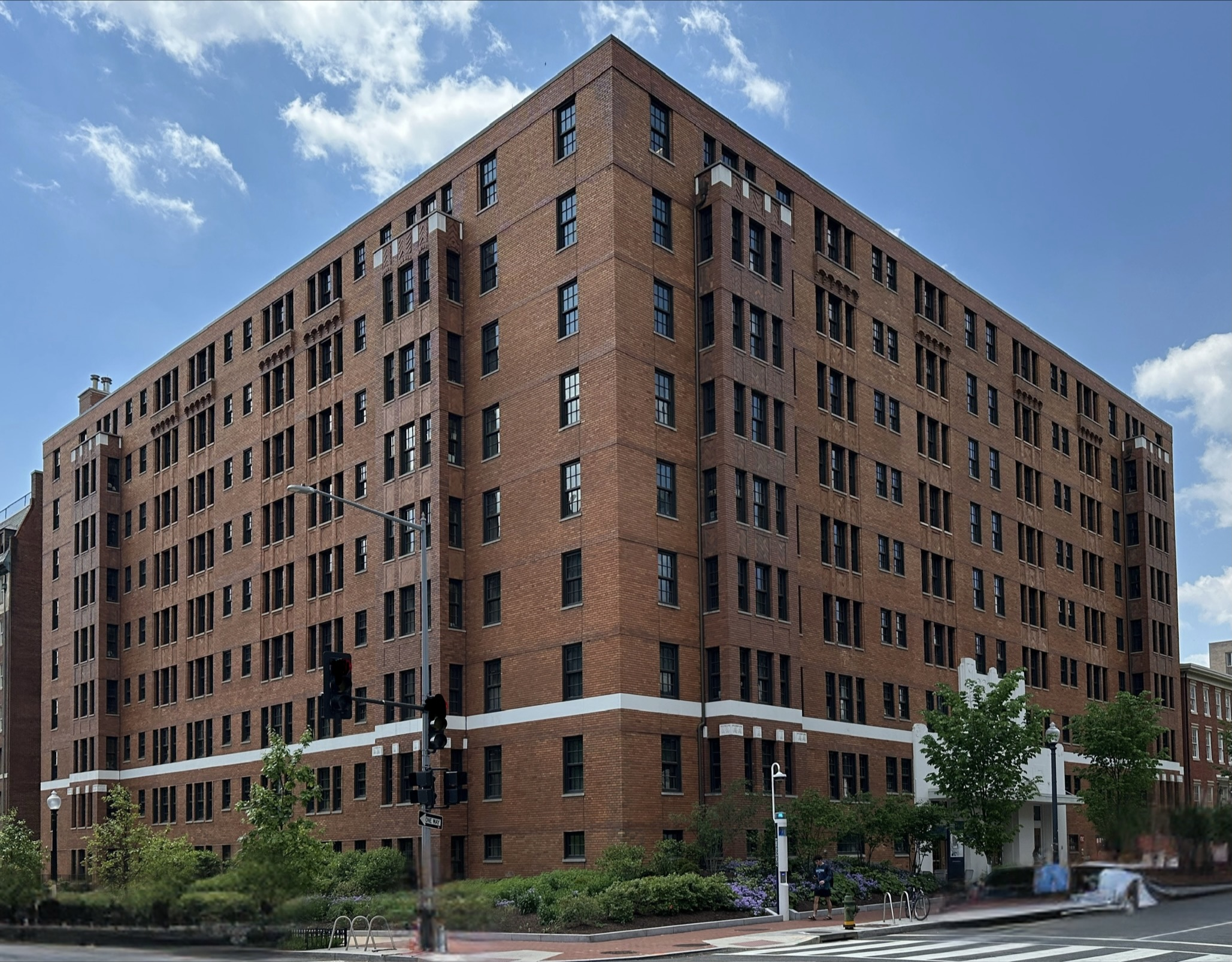
Park Central (Thurston Hall), c. 1928

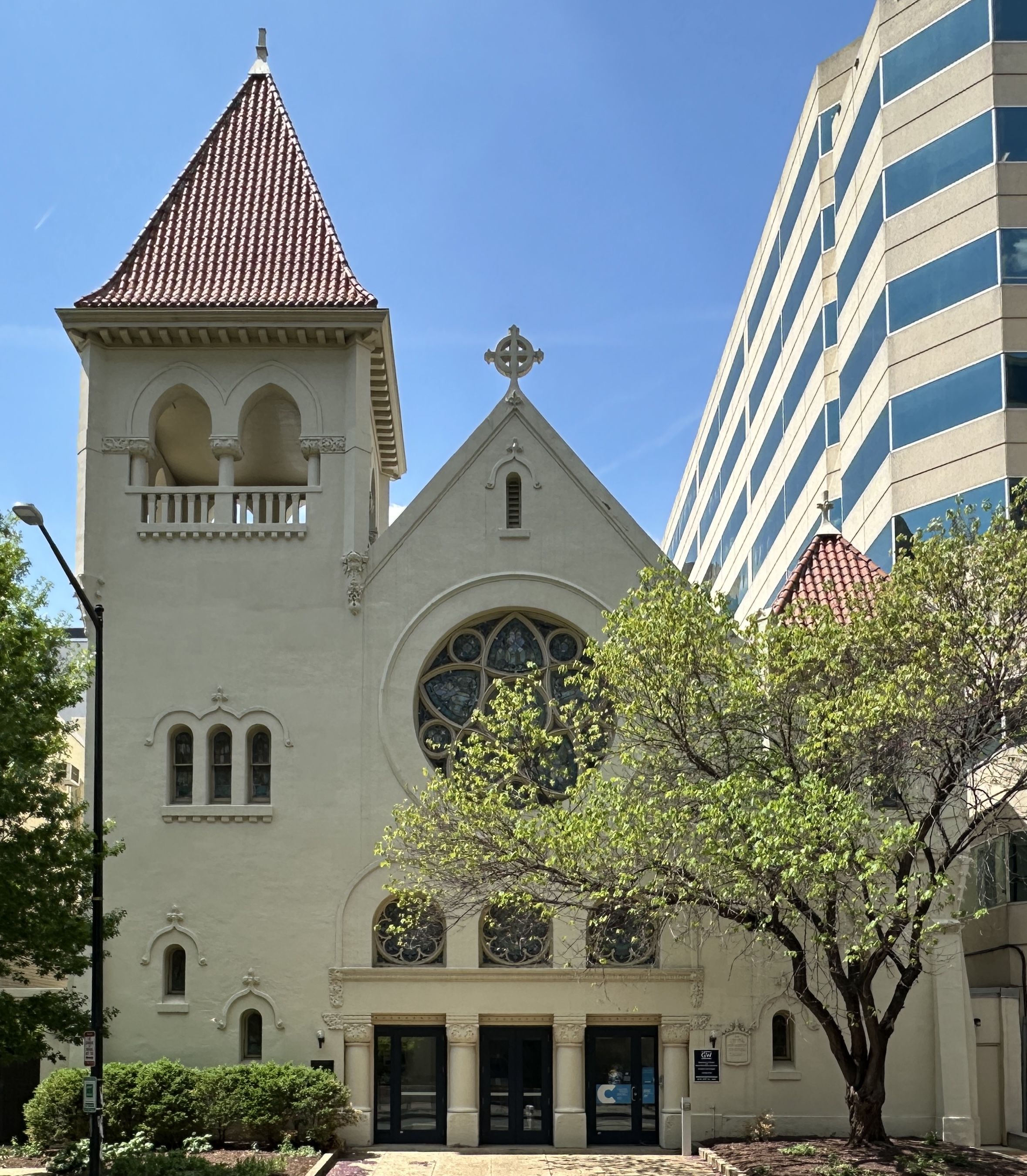
Union Methodist Episcopal Church, c. 1848. Remodeled in 1910

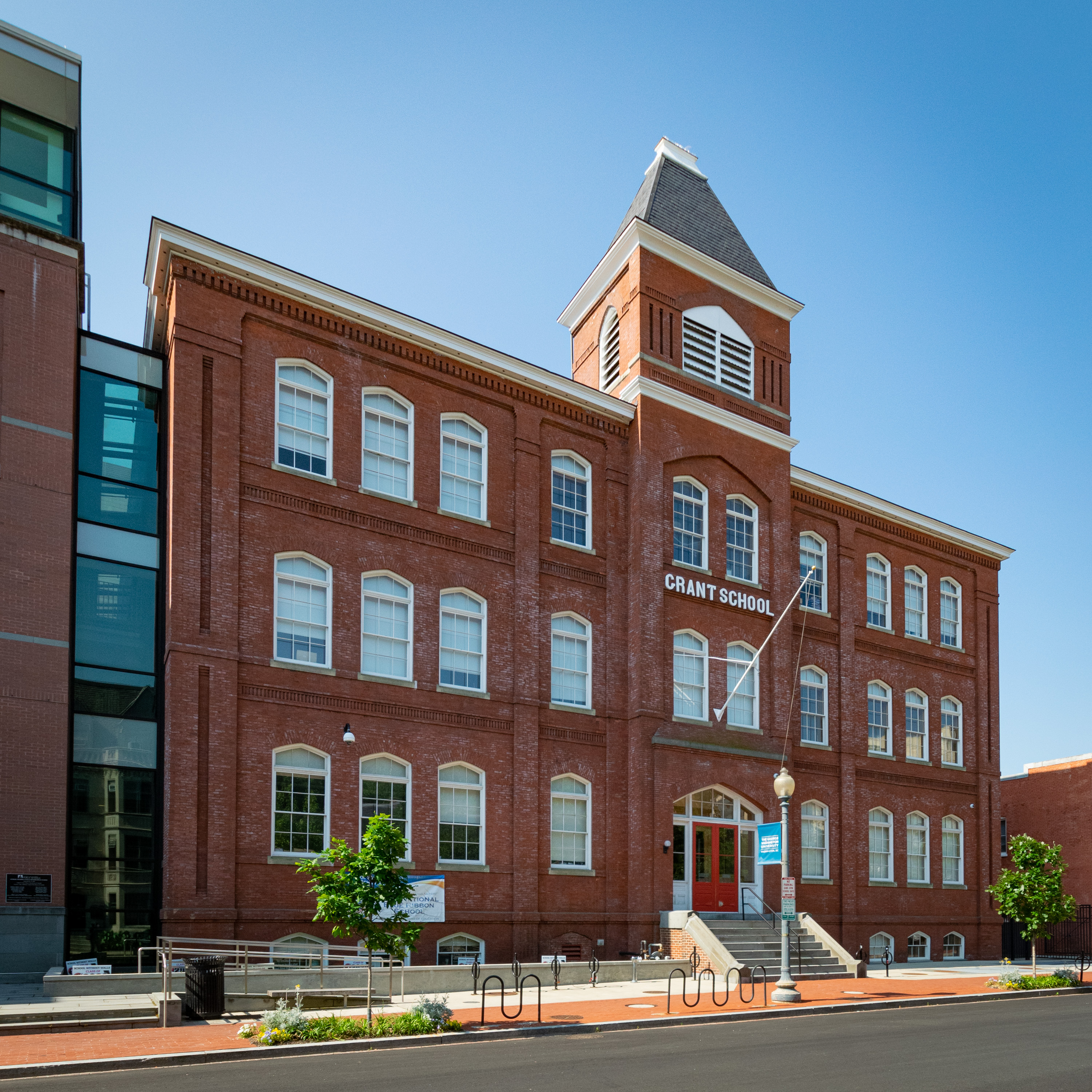
Grant School, c. 1882

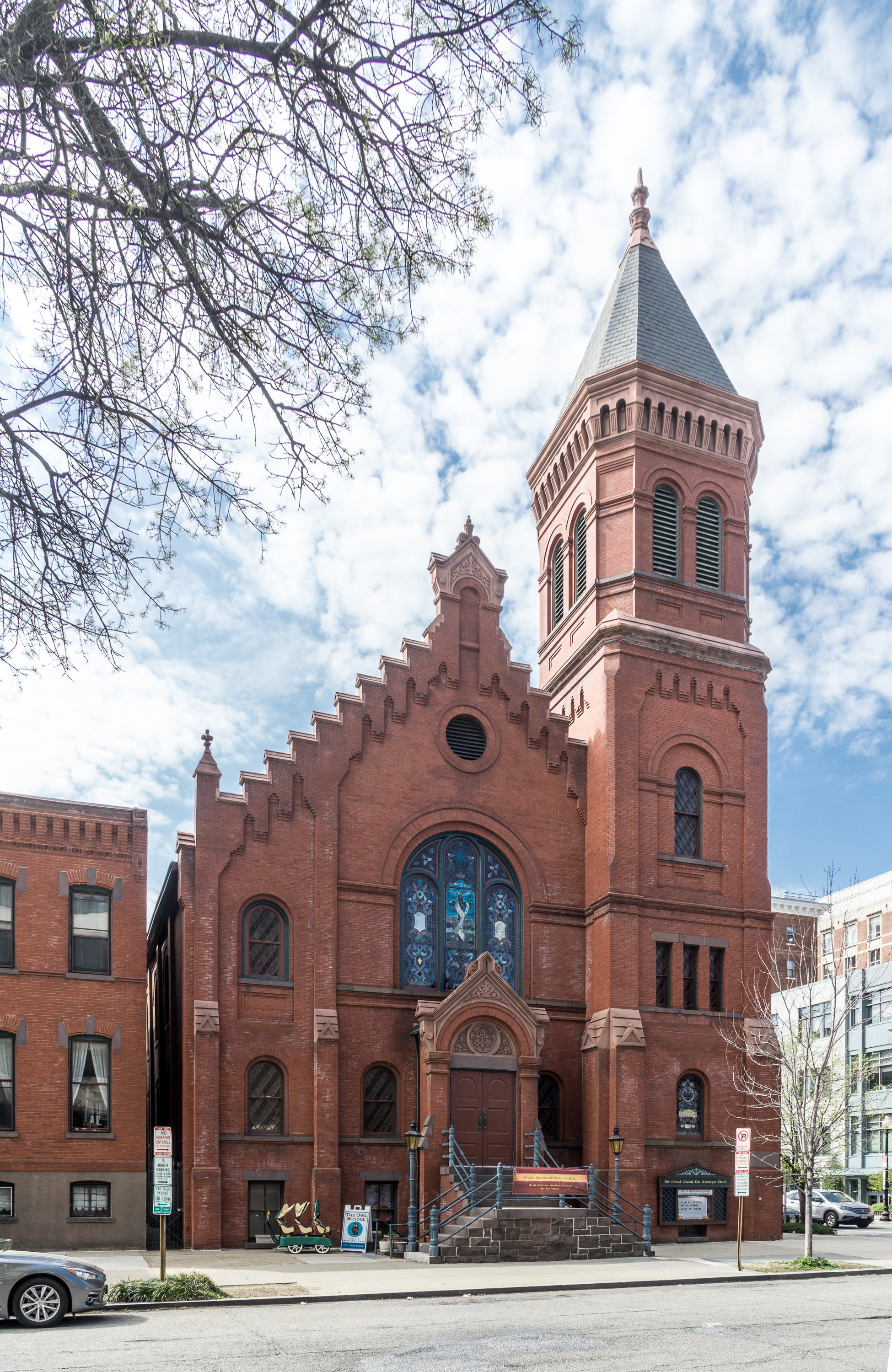
Concordia German Evangelical Church, c. 1892

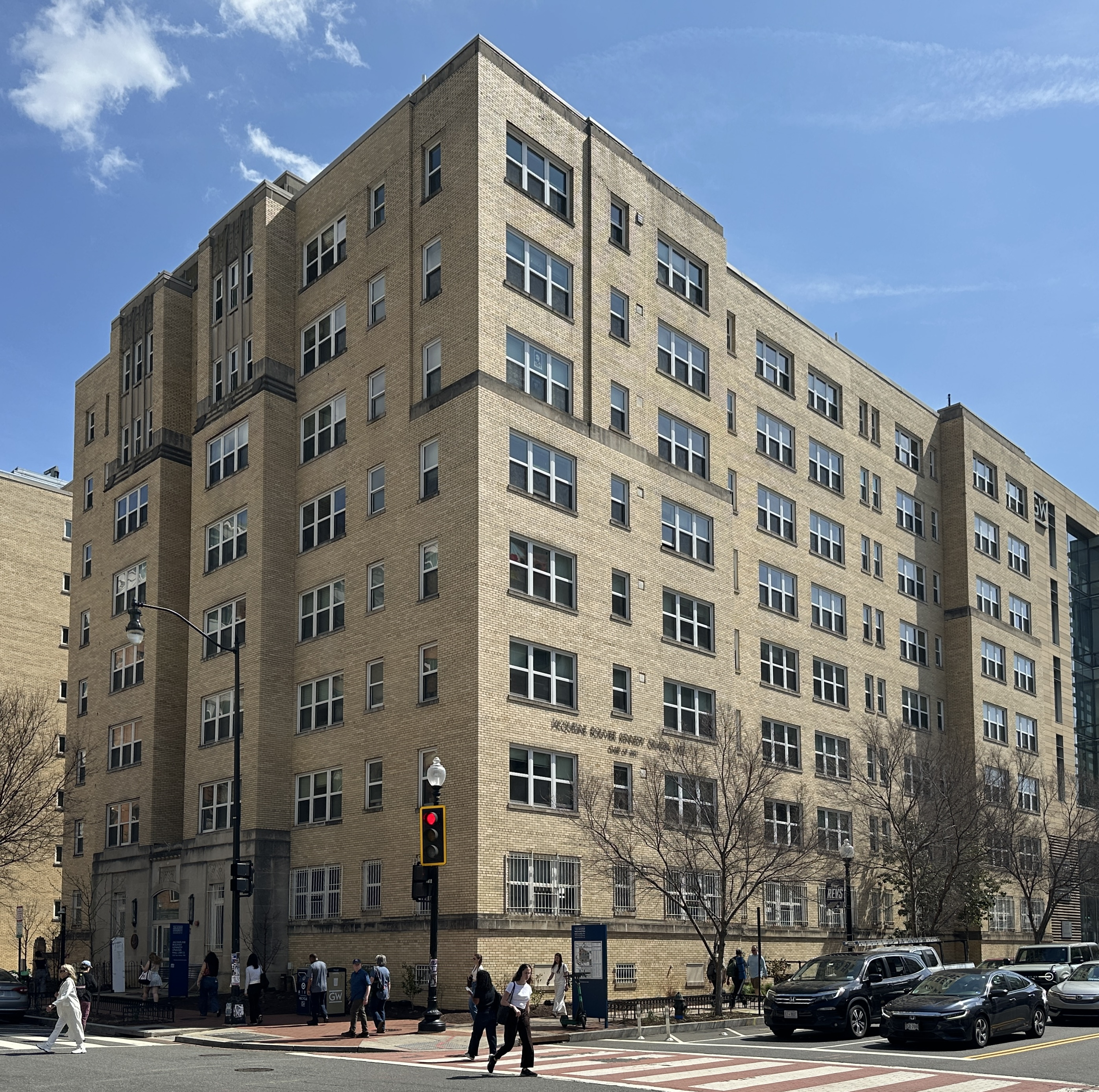
Jacqueline Bouvier Kennedy Onassis Hall, c. 1938

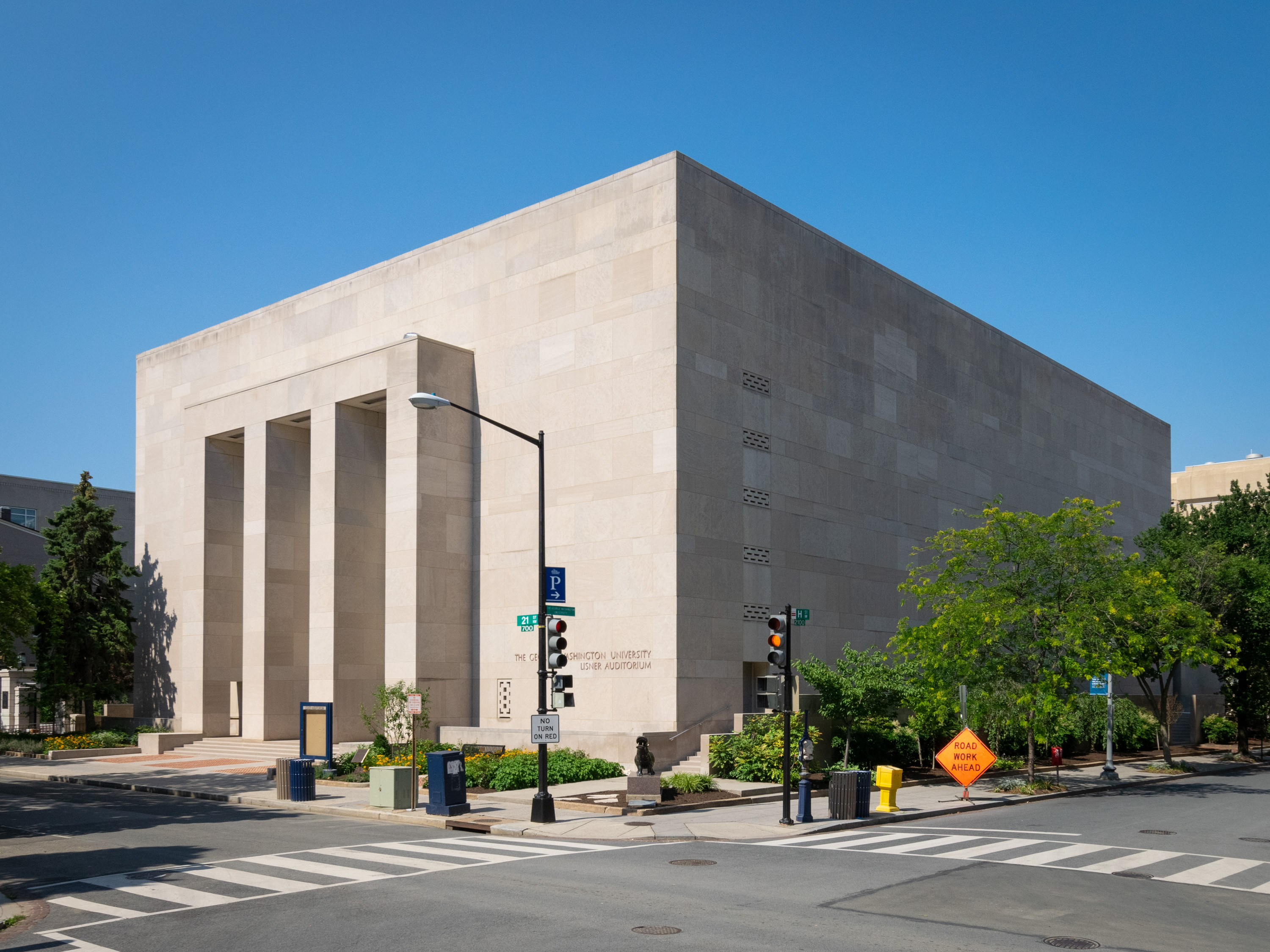
Lisner Auditorium, c. 1946

== Infrastructure ==
=== Major thoroughfares and highways ===
Foggy Bottom is crossed by Virginia Avenue, New Hampshire Avenue, and Pennsylvania Avenue; the latter two intersect at Washington Circle, which serves as a roundabout. K Street borders Foggy Bottom to the north, while Constitution Avenue borders it to the south. Interstate 66 crosses the Theodore Roosevelt Bridge and enters Foggy Bottom via the E Street Expressway and the Potomac Freeway, providing access to Arlington County, Virginia. The Potomac Freeway then connects with the Whitehurst Freeway, which runs along the Georgetown waterfront towards Key Bridge. Rock Creek Parkway passes Foggy Bottom via its shore along the Potomac River.

=== Cycling ===
Foggy Bottom has protected bike lanes on Virginia Avenue, G Street, 21st Street, and 20th Street. Unprotected bike lanes run along I Street and H Street. The Rock Creek Trail, a shared trail for pedestrians and cyclists, runs through Foggy Bottom along Rock Creek Parkway and the riverbank of the Potomac.

=== Public transit ===
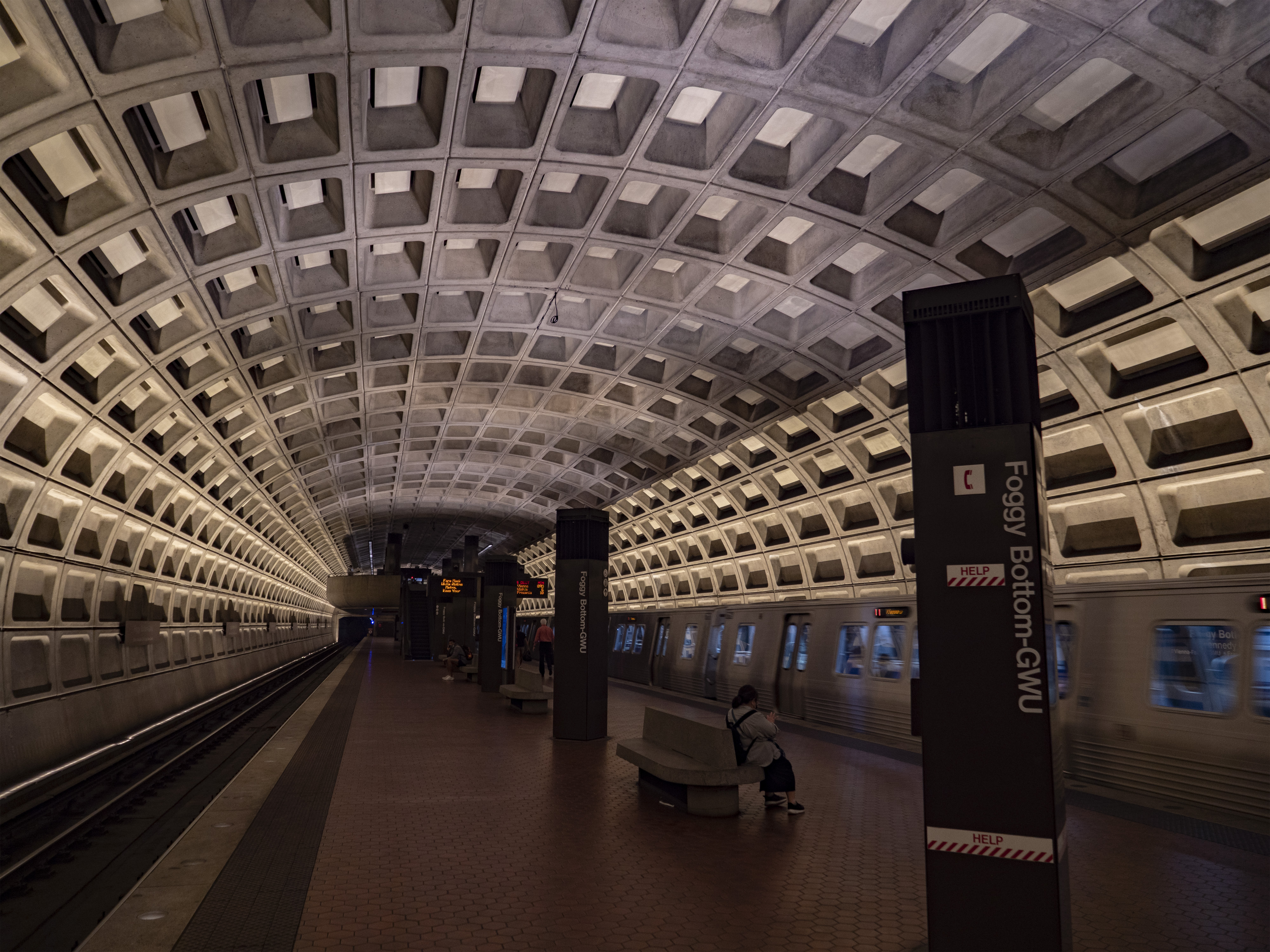
Interior of the Foggy Bottom Metro station

24 Capital Bikeshare stations are located throughout Foggy Bottom. The Foggy Bottom Metro station on 23rd Street is served by the Orange, Blue, and Silver Metro lines. The following Metrobus routes provide service in the neighborhood:

- A49 Columbia Pike-Metro Center
- A58 Wilson Blvd-Farragut Sq
- C85 Nebraska Av-Foggy Bottom
- D10 Pennsylvania Av
- D74 Rhode Island Av-Foggy Bottom
- D80 Wisconsin Av-Union Station
- D82 Wisconsin Av-Foggy Bottom
- D96 Massachusetts Av-Bethesda
- F19 Mt Vernon Estate Exp

== Education ==
The School Without Walls, a small public magnet high school, is housed in the historic Grant School building on G Street. GW, which operates as a private federally chartered research university, has its main campus in Foggy Bottom, and has 14 schools and colleges that offer undergraduate and graduate programs.

== Neighborhood amenities ==
Foggy Bottom has several parks. Rawlins Park is a 1.5 acre park adjacent to the US Department of the Interior headquarters and that surrounds an 1875 statue of Civil War General John Aaron Rawlins. GW campus contains outdoor spaces such as University Yard, Anniversary Park, and Kogan Plaza. Recreational facilities include the Thompson Boat Center, a boathouse on the Potomac River near the intersection of Rock Creek Parkway and Virginia Avenue, as well as GW's Lerner Health and Wellness Center, which are open to students and Foggy Bottom residents.

== See also ==
- West End (Washington, D.C.)
- Georgetown (Washington, D.C.)
- George Washington University

== Bibliography ==
- Borchert, James (1974). "Alley Life in Washington: An Analysis of 600 Photographs". Records of the Columbia Historical Society, Washington, D.C. 49: 244–259.
- Gillette, Howard (2006). Between Justice and Beauty: Race, Planning, and the Failure of Urban Policy in Washington, D. C. Philadelphia: University of Pennsylvania Press. ISBN 978-0-8122-1958-6.
- Harris, Laura; Williams, Kim (September 24, 2013). National Register of Historic Places Registration Form - George Washington University/Old West End Historic District. Washington, D.C.: National Park Service.
- National Capital Housing Authority (1944). Report of the National Capital Housing Authority for the 10-Year Period 1934-1944. Washington, D.C.: National Capital Housing Authority.
- Sherwood, Suzanne Berry (January 1, 1981). Foggy Bottom 1800 - 1975: A Study in the Uses of an Urban Neighborhood. Washington, D.C.: George Washington University Center for Washington Area Studies.
- Snyderman, Lois (May 21, 1987). National Register of Historic Places Registration Form - Foggy Bottom (PDF). Washington, D.C.: National Park Service.
