= M. Evelyn McCormick =

American painter (1862–1948)

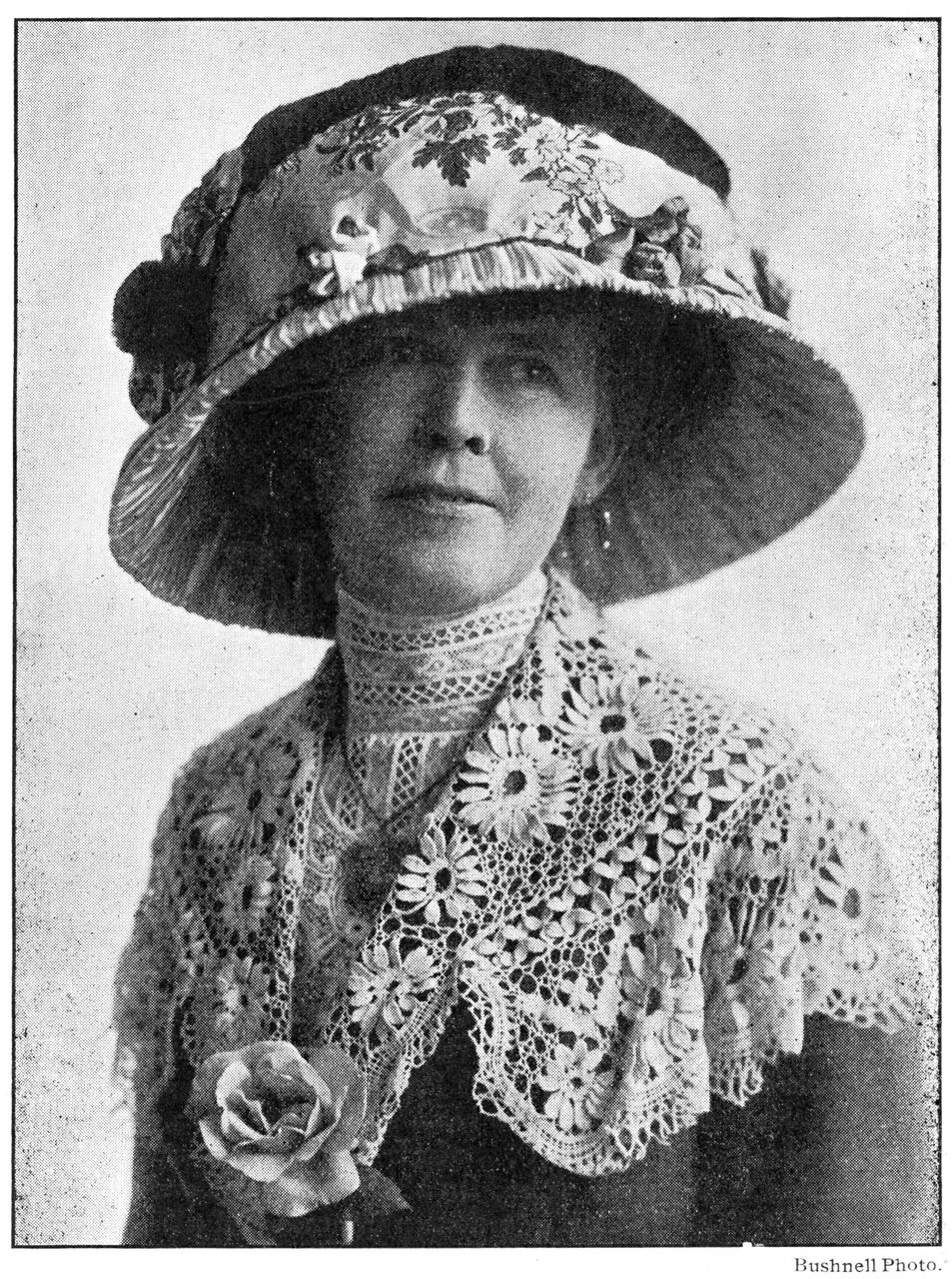
- Born: December 2, 1862; Placerville, California, US
- Died: May 6, 1948 (aged 85); Monterey, California, US
- Education: California School of Design, Académie Julian
- Known for: Painting
- Movement: American Impressionism

Mary Evelyn McCormick (December 2, 1862 – May 6, 1948) was an American painter.

== Early life and training ==
Mary Evelyn (Eve) McCormick was born on December 2, 1862, to Irish immigrants in Placerville, California. By 1867, the family had moved to San Francisco, where her father's occupation was listed as "barkeeper" or "liquor dealer". After completing grammar school she trained in the early 1880s at the Irving Institute, a private academy for college-bound girls, where she received her first professional lessons in art. While a student at the Institute, she exhibited her painted porcelain at the California State Fair (1881) and at the San Francisco Mechanics' Institute Fair (1882). She studied at the California School of Design in San Francisco under Thomas Hill, Ernest Narjot, Emil Carlsen, Virgil Williams, and Raymond Dabb Yelland. Here she was awarded an Honorable Mention for oil painting in 1886 and the Avery Gold Medal for her study of chrysanthemums in 1888. She befriended students who later became prominent in the art world, including Isabel Hunter, Mary DeNeale Morgan, Mary Williams (a.k.a. Kate Carew), and Guy Rose. She fell passionately in love with Rose and followed him to Paris in 1889. Both studied painting at the Académie Julian under Jules Joseph Lefebvre and Jean-Joseph Benjamin-Constant. At this time she reportedly began her long friendship with Sarah Bernhardt. McCormick and Rose also spent time painting in the tiny village of Giverny, where Claude Monet lived and worked; she was influenced by Monet, Camille Pissarro, Georges Seurat and other French Impressionists. In 1891, she exhibited her canvas A Garden in Giverny at the Salon and her Afternoon at Giverny at the Academy of Arts, Berlin. Both artists returned to California in 1891.

== Career in California ==
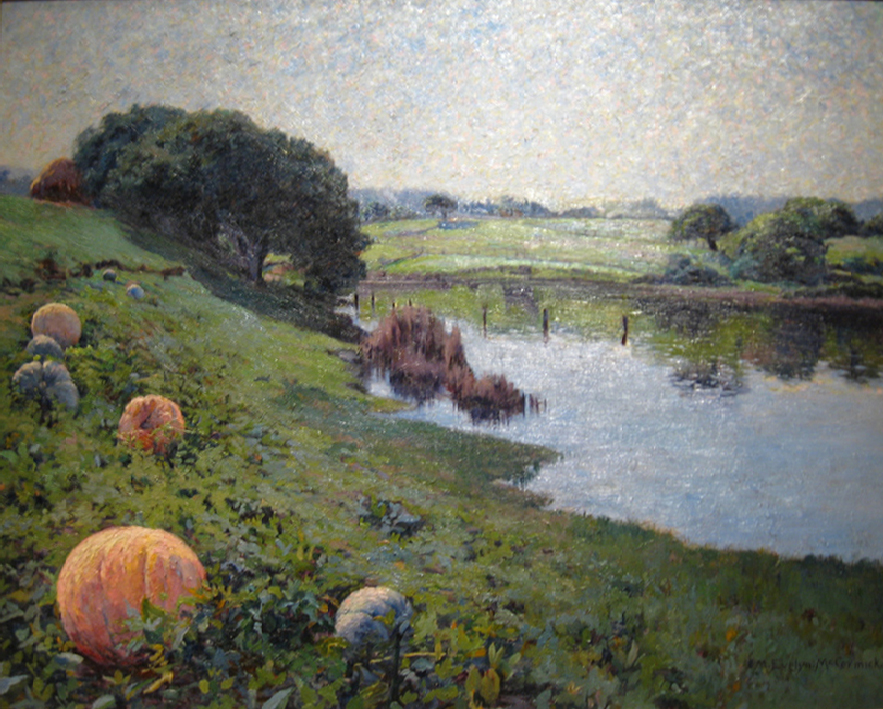
Carmel Valley pumpkins (1907), Los Angeles County Museum of Art

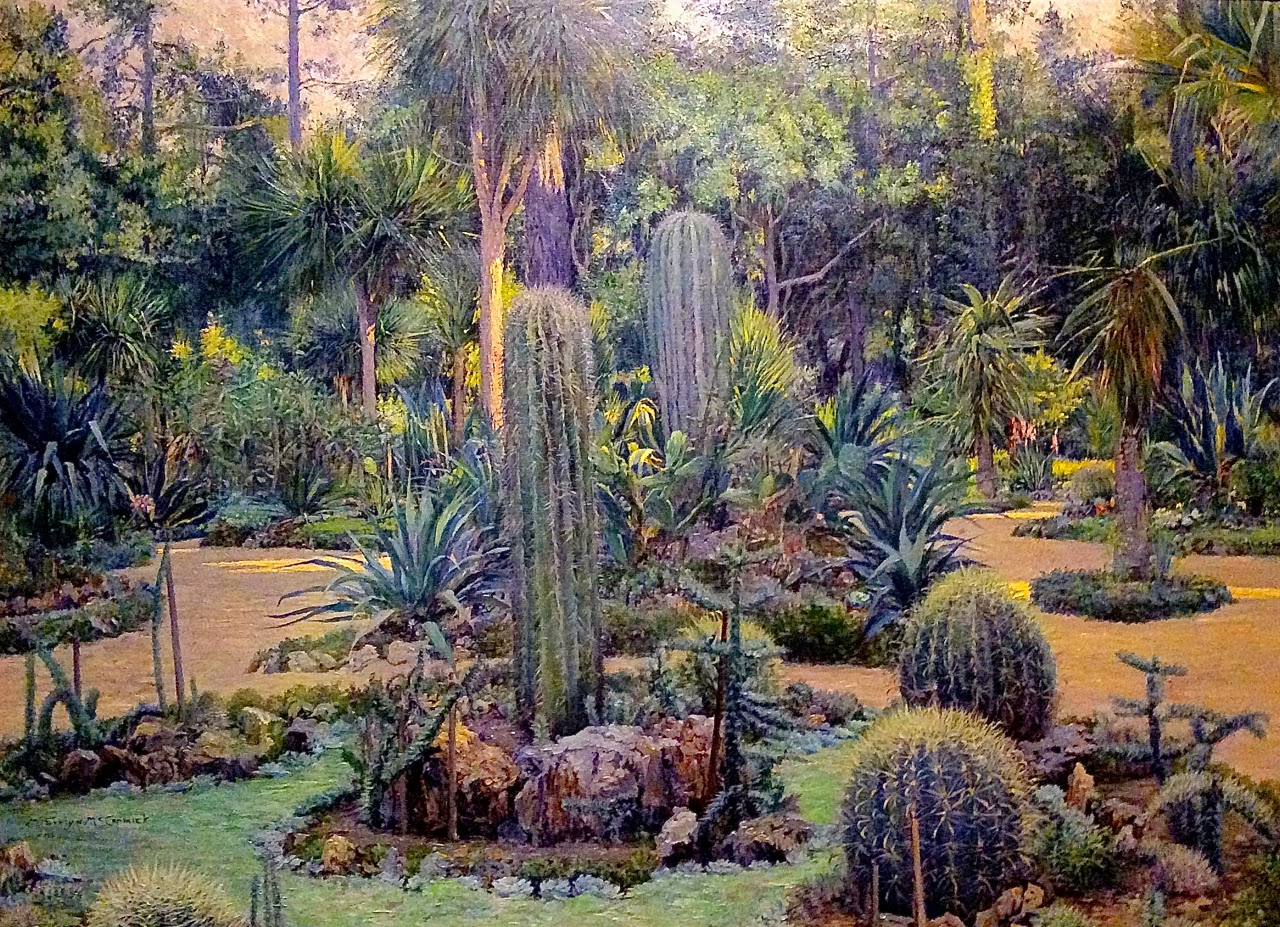
Cactus Garden, Del Monte

She became an active exhibitor and organizer with the San Francisco Art Association and continued to exhibit at the Mechanics Institute Fair. By 1891, she was painting on the Monterey Peninsula, where she found inspiration and a wealth of subjects for her Impressionist landscapes, and sometimes stayed with her artist-companion Mary Brady in Pacific Grove. At the 1893 World's Columbian Exposition in Chicago she displayed two oils at the Palace of Fine Arts: Mission at San Luis Rey and Morning at Giverny. She also exhibited her painting Cactus Garden in the California Room at The Woman's Building at the Exhibition. In July 1889, she acquired rooms in Monterey's Old Customhouse to begin a series of sketches on "historic Monterey", but moved in 1902 to the nearby Pacific House. After the death of her father in 1906, she was compelled to spend more time with her mother in San Francisco, where she maintained her primary residence until her permanent move Monterey c. 1919. Some of her work was destroyed in the 1906 earthquake. In April 1907, she exhibited at the opening of the Art Gallery in the Hotel Del Monte, a luxury resort in Monterey. At the Del Monte Art Gallery she served on the jury and hanging committee between 1909 and 1911 and was a member of its advisory committee in 1916–17. In July 1910, she contributed her oils to the Fourth Annual Exhibition of the Carmel Arts and Crafts Club and four years later she helped to entertain William Merritt Chase during his Carmel Summer School. She again exhibited at the Carmel Club Annuals in 1919 and 1924; at the latter she displayed Monterey Boats. In May 1922, she sold one of her many Stevenson House paintings to the British Ambassador to the United States and traveled to Europe shortly thereafter. On her return she exhibited at the Hotel Del Monte and contributed to the Statewide Annual Exhibitions of the Santa Cruz Art League (1928–1930). During the Great Depression she was commissioned by the WPA to paint the crumbling but charming old Monterey adobes for posterity. These paintings hang in the offices of Monterey city officials and public buildings. In May 1934, her paintings of Monterey and Europe were given a one-person exhibition at the Stanford University Art Gallery. Between 1936 and 1947, she was a frequent and popular exhibitor with the Carmel Art Association. Miss Evelyn McCormick died unexpectedly of heart failure on May 6, 1948, in her Monterey hotel.

Like their French counterparts, California Impressionists attempted to capture the light of a particular moment, both groups emphasizing the transitory nature of life. However, California Impressionists expanded the goal, attempting to evoke man's kinship with nature and the oneness of all living things. Notable works by McCormick include Along the French Coast, Wheat Fields - Giverny, and Carmel Valley Pumpkins (ca.1907) owned by the Los Angeles County Museum of Art. Her paintings are primarily found in California museums and galleries, and in private collections in the West.

== Exhibits ==
- California State Fair, 1881, 1901; Paris Salon, 1891.
- San Francisco School of Design Annual Exhibits, 1887, 1888.
- Mechanics' Institute (SF), 1892.
- San Francisco Art Association, 1892-1916; Berlin, 1891.
- World's Columbian Expo (Chicago), 1893.
- California Midwinter International Expo, 1894.
- National Academy of Design (New York City), 1896.
- Del Monte Art Gallery (Monterey), 1907-12.
- Panama-Pacific International Exposition, 1915 (bronze medal).
- California Artists, DeYoung Museum, 1915; Gump's (San Francisco), 1924.
- Old Custom House, Monterey, Mural 1935, 1939.
- Golden Gate International Exposition, 1939.

== Works held in museums ==
- Berkeley Art Museum, Berkeley, California.
- Crocker Art Museum, Sacramento, California.
- Los Angeles County Museum of Art, Los Angeles, California.
- Monterey Museum of Art, Monterey, California.
- Robert Louis Stevenson House, Monterey, California.

== Sources ==
- Edwards, Robert W. (2012). Jennie V. Cannon: The Untold History of the Carmel and Berkeley Art Colonies, Vol. 1. Oakland, CA.: East Bay Heritage Project. ISBN 9781467545679.
- Gerdts, William, H. (1993). Monet's Giverny: An Impressionist Colony. New York: Abbeville Press. ISBN 1558593861.
- Hirsh, Nelda (2013). A Bohemian Life: M. Evelyn McCormick, American Impressionist (1862-1948). Green Rock Books. ISBN 978-0982965016.
- Shields, Scott A. (2006). Artists At Continent's End: The Monterey Peninsula Art Colony, 1875-1907. Berkeley, CA: The University of California Press. ISBN 978-0520247390.
- South, Will (1995). Guy Rose: American Impressionist. The Oakland Museum. ISBN 1882140079.
