= Monterey Museum of Art =

Art museum in Monterey, California

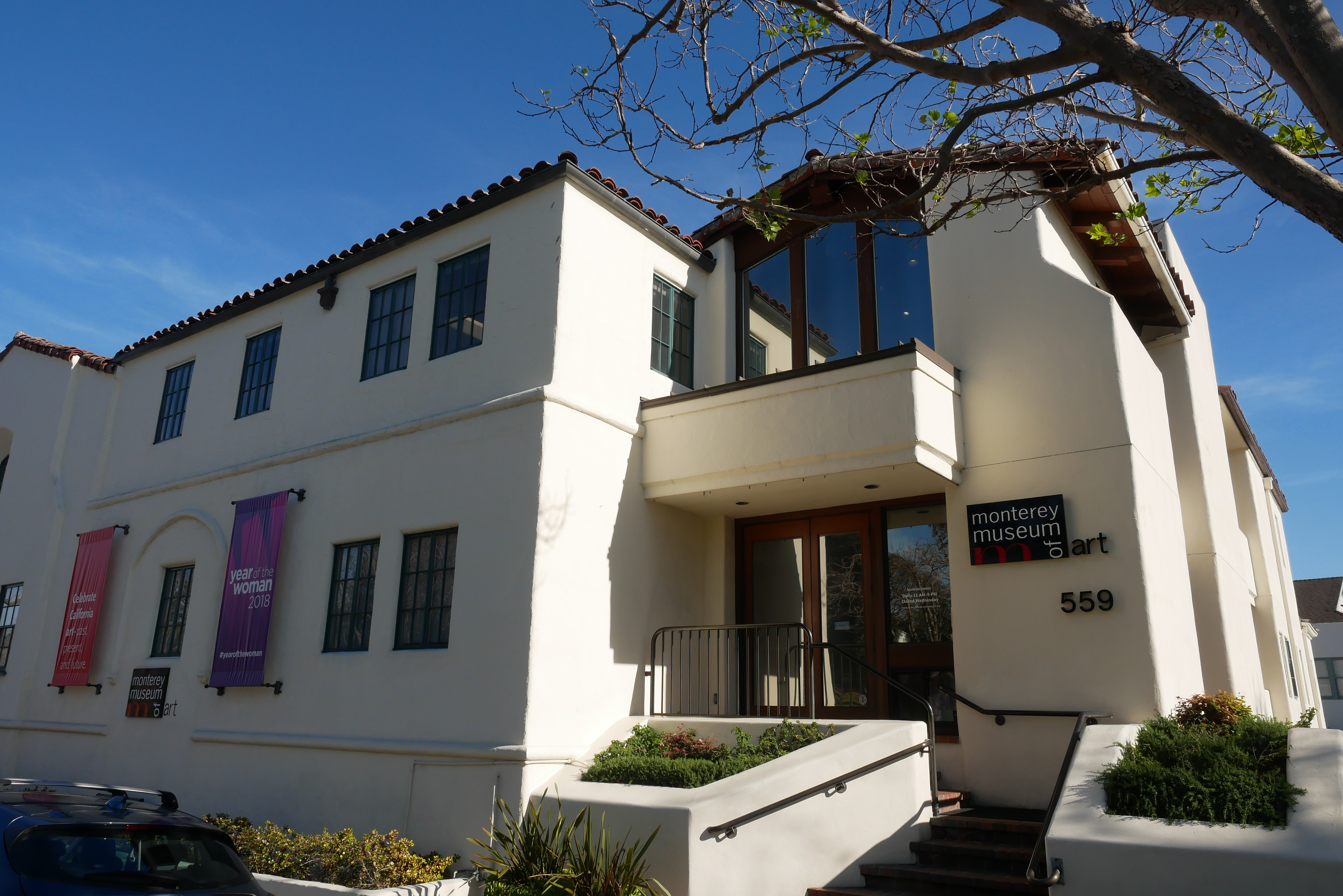
- Monterey Museum of Art
- Established: 1959
- Location: 559 Pacific Street, Monterey, California 93940
- Coordinates: 36.597295°N 121.896637°W
- Visitors: Thursday through Sunday 11:00 am – 4:00 pm. Closed on Monday, Tuesday, and Wednesday.
- Website: www.montereyart.org

The Monterey Museum of Art (MMA) an art museum located in Monterey, California. It was founded in 1959 as a chapter of the American Federation of Arts. The Monterey Museum of Art's mission is to engage the community and celebrate the diversity of California art--past, present, and future , with painting, sculpture, photography, and mixed media from the nineteenth century to the present day. Notable holdings celebrate the heritage of Northern and Central California, and especially for early California images from the Carmel Art Colony.

The Museum is located at 559 Pacific Street in the heart of historic downtown Monterey. The Pacific Street location has eight galleries and houses the administrative and curatorial offices, the Buck Education Center, an part of its archives.

In 1983, the Monterey Museum of Art acquired the historic estate of La Mirada, whose history reflects the heritage of the Monterey area. La Mirada is closed to the public except for special Museum events and programs or as a rental venue . La Mirada is also available educational and research purpose on an appointment basis.

== Exhibitions ==
MMA presents approximately twenty exhibitions annually. These include thematic exhibitions selected from the permanent collection, presentations of local artists and major traveling exhibitions from other institutions. In addition to the museum's exhibitions, it presents educational programs that reach thousands of area youth annually, docent programs, classes, lectures and workshops, and exhibition tours.

MMA aims to provide greater accessibility to the entire community with two ongoing events. On Free Family Fun Days , typically on the first Saturday of the month, the Museum is free for all between 11 am and 3 pm, and offers hands-on art activities for the whole family. On First Fridays, the museum is free between 5 pm and 7 pm and welcomes the public to enjoy the gallery spaces, live music, and an art activity. Additionally, the Museum holds its annual Block Party , a free daylong arts festival that draws over 4,000 people to downtown Monterey, in April; and Iluminado a monthlong seasonal celebration of unity, creativity, and wonder in January/December. Central to Iluminado are art installations that invite community participation and evolve throughout the month.

Other local institutions, including Monterey Peninsula College, Monterey Institute of International Studies, the Defense Language Institute and California State University Monterey Bay frequently use the museum as a resource for classes. The Museum also offers school tours to local elementary through high school students throughout the academic year.

== Permanent collections ==
The museum's permanent collection focuses on celebrating the diversity of California art--past, present, and future. The collection consists of more than 14,000 objects in the following areas: early California painting (1875–1945), photography, contemporary art (1945–present). Highlights of the museum's collection include works by Armin Hansen, William Ritschel, M. Evelyn McCormick, and E. Charlton Fortune, as well as that of world-renowned photographers Edward Weston and Ansel Adams.

=== Early California painting ===
Notable artists, represented in the museum, who worked in California in the late 19th and early 20th centuries:

- Jules Tavernier
- E. Charlton Fortune

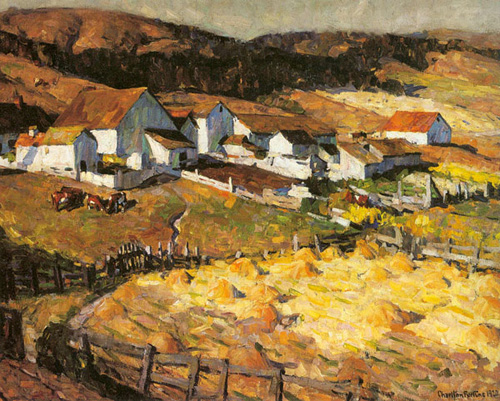
Charlton Fortune's Hatton Ranch

- Evelyn McCormick
- Gottardo Piazzoni
- Francis McComas
- William Ritschel

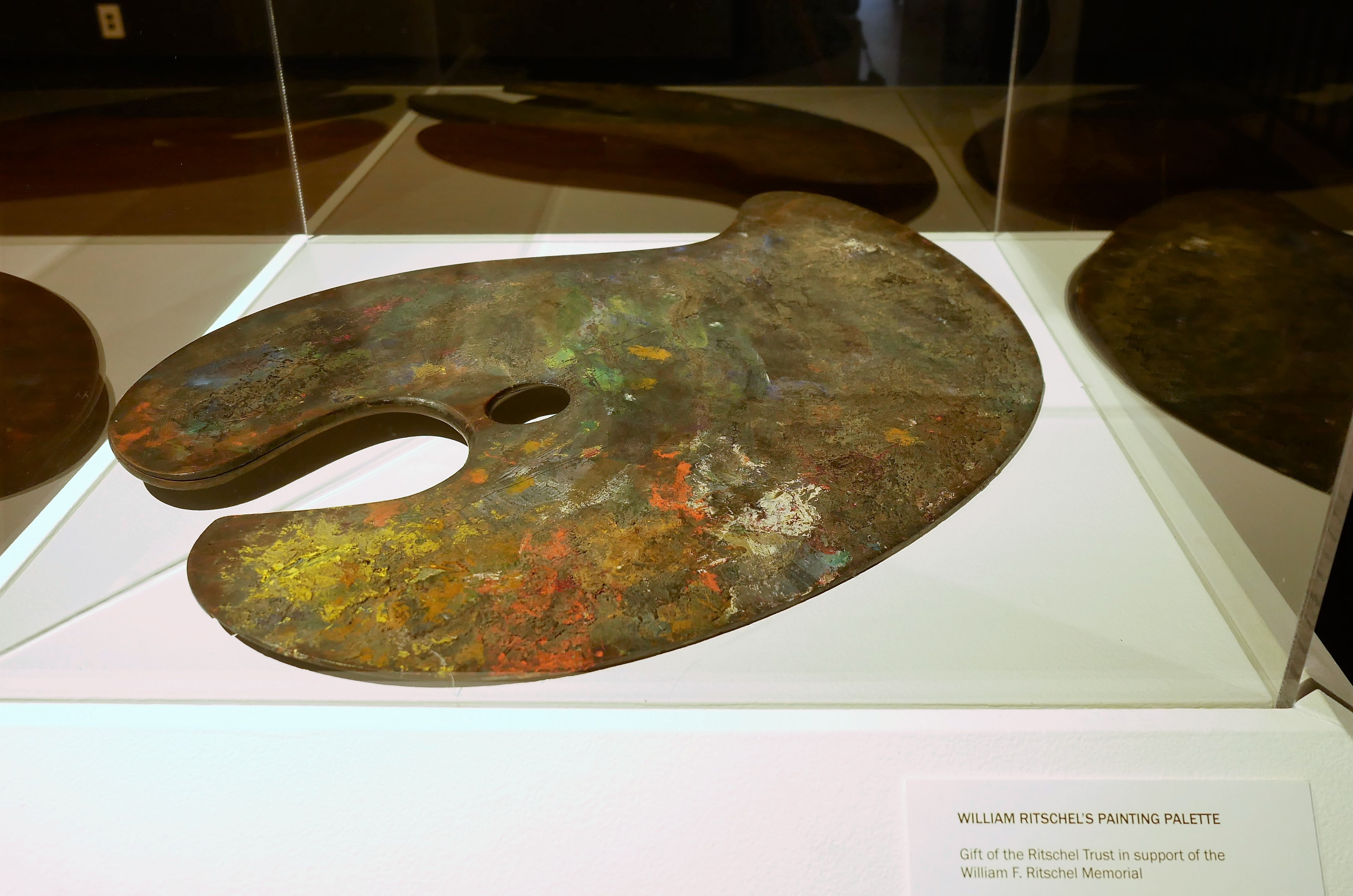
Ritschel Painting Palette

- Armin Hansen

=== Photography ===
Photographers represented in the permanent collection:

- Carleton Watkins
- William Henry Jackson
- Anne Brigman
- Johan Hagemeyer
- Edward Weston
- Brett Weston
- Ansel Adams
- Imogen Cunningham
- Wynn Bullock
- Charles Sheeler
- Aaron Siskind
- Irving Penn
- Sally Mann
- Garry Winogrand

=== Contemporary art ===
Contemporary art holdings:

- Nathan Oliveira
- David Park
- Roland Petersen
- Ilya Bolotowsky
- Larry Rivers
- James Rosenquist
- Wayne Thiebaud

=== American art ===
American Art holdings from the 19th century to 1945.

- Thomas Eakins
- John Sloane
- Childe Hassam
- Oscar Bluemner
- Stanton Macdonald-Wright
- Rockwell Kent
- Grant Wood
- David Alfaro Siqueiros
- Rufino Tamayo

=== Selected collection highlights ===
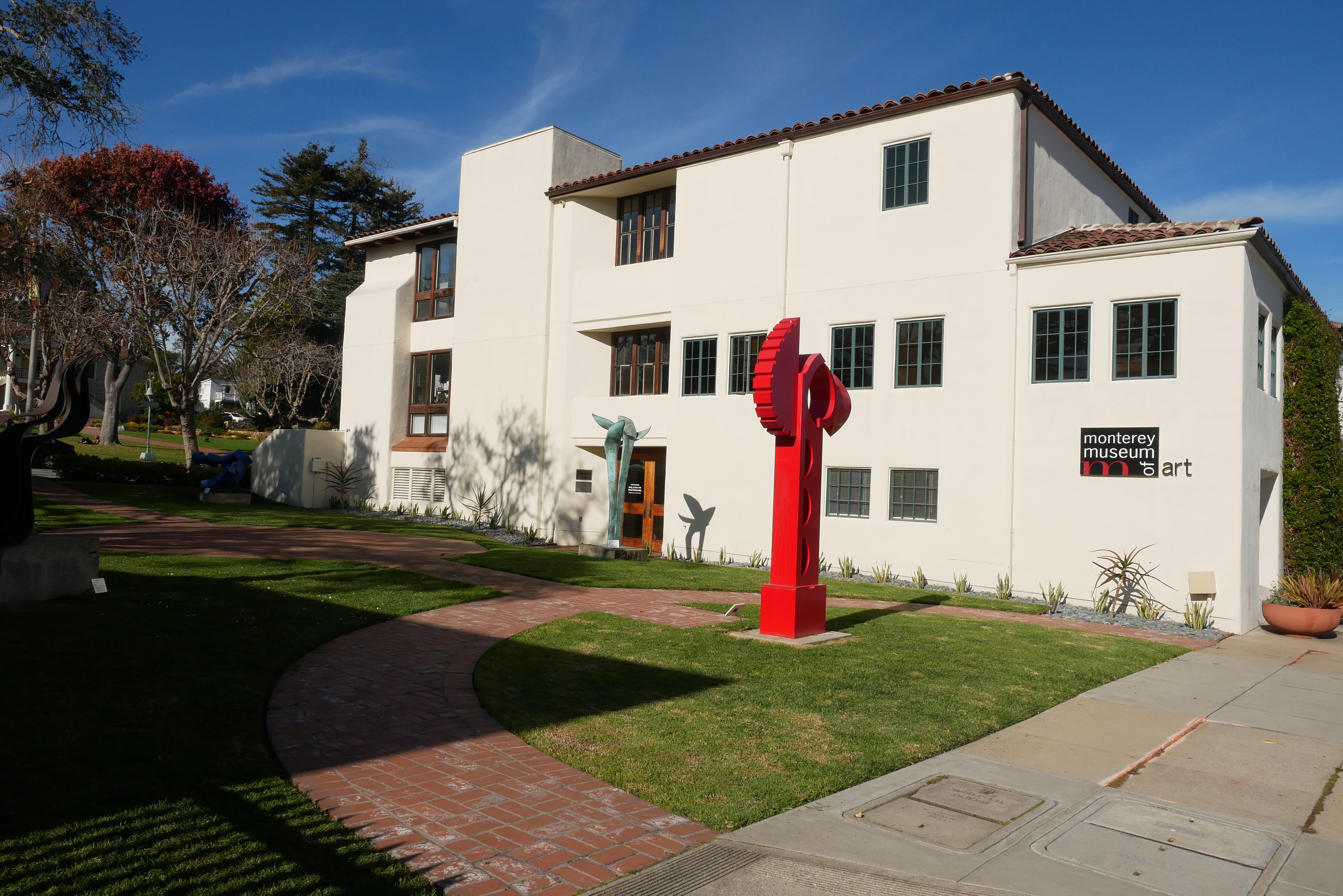
Outside sculptures

Entrance to the Monterey Museum of Art at La Mirada Gardens

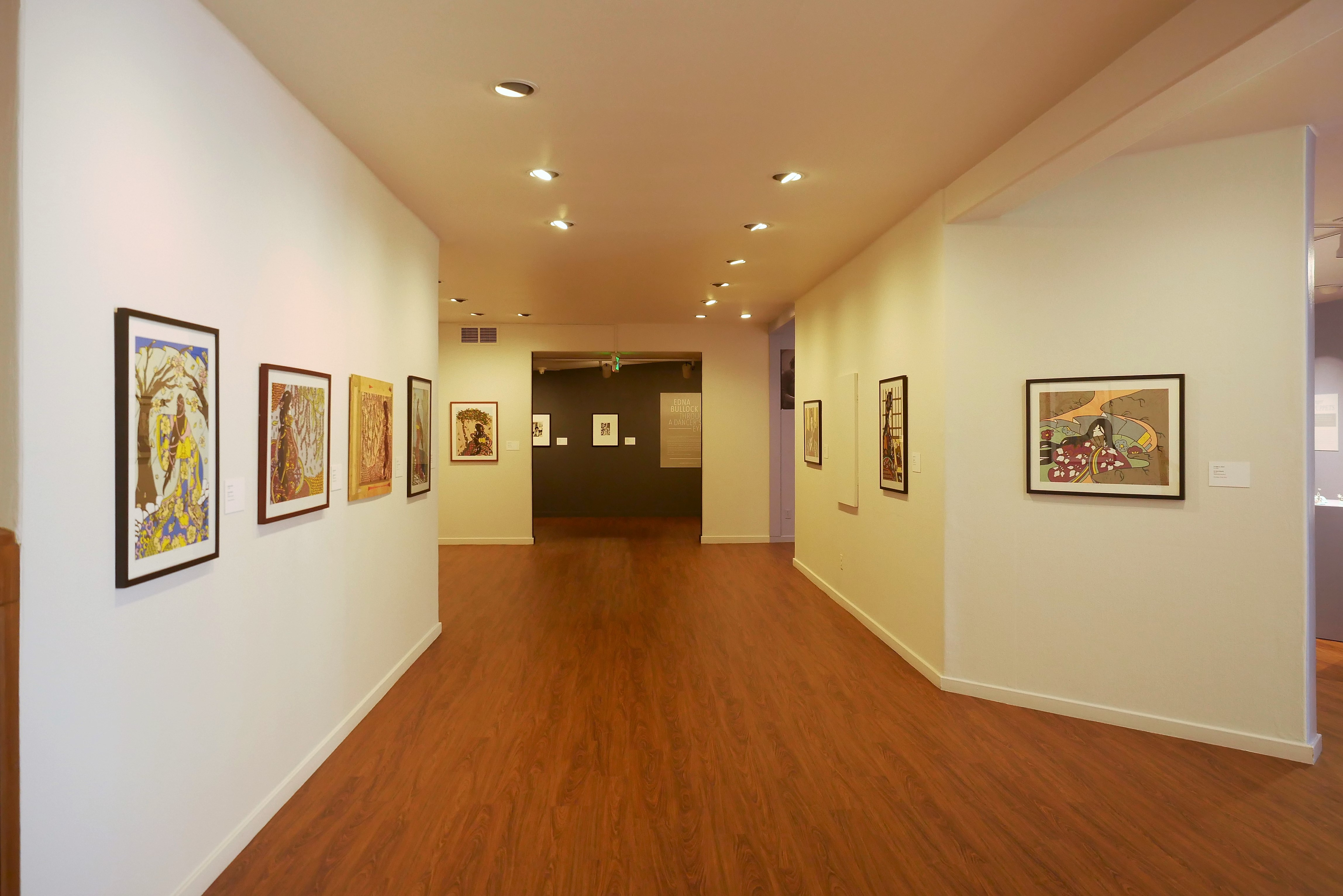
Downstairs gallery

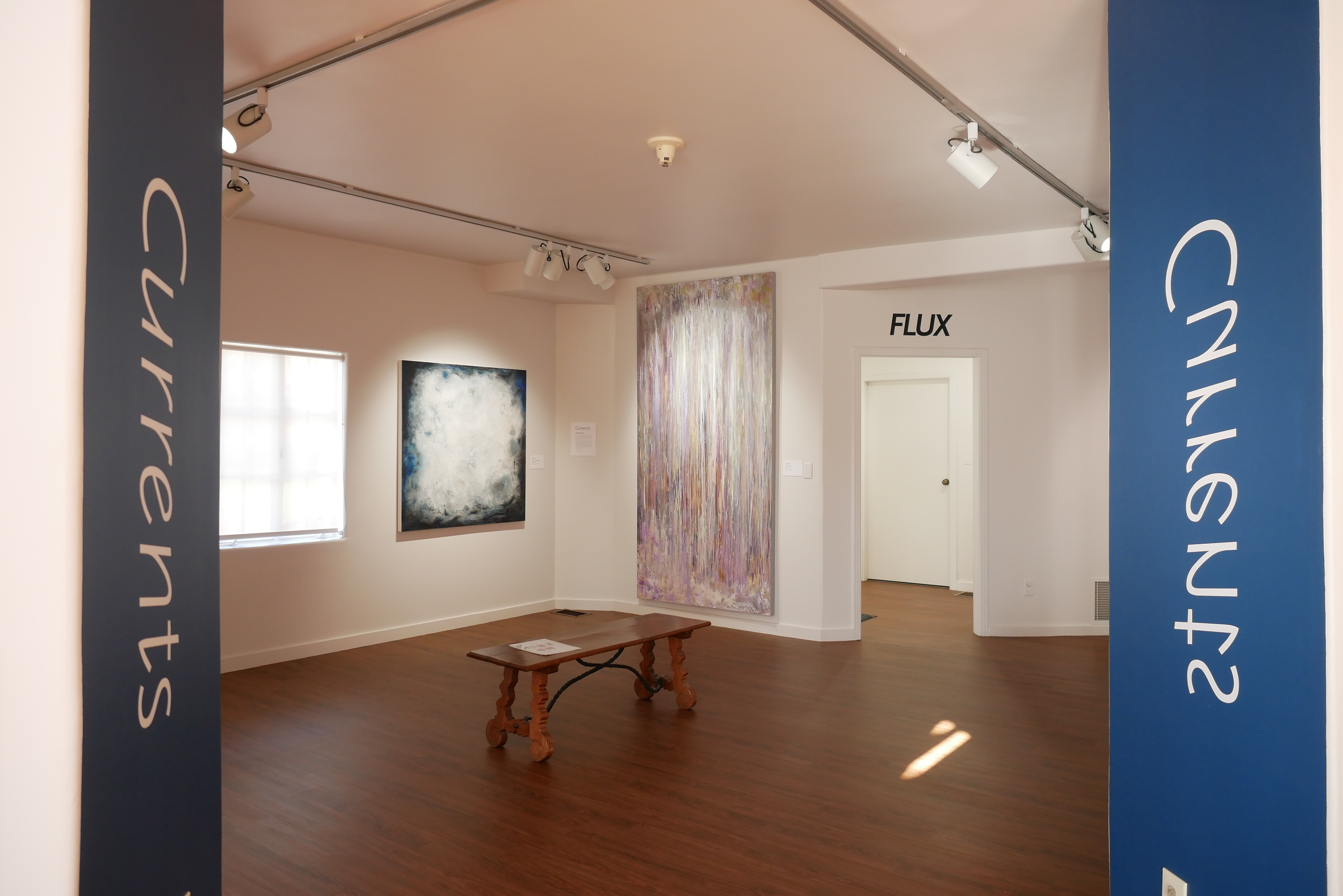
Downstairs gallery

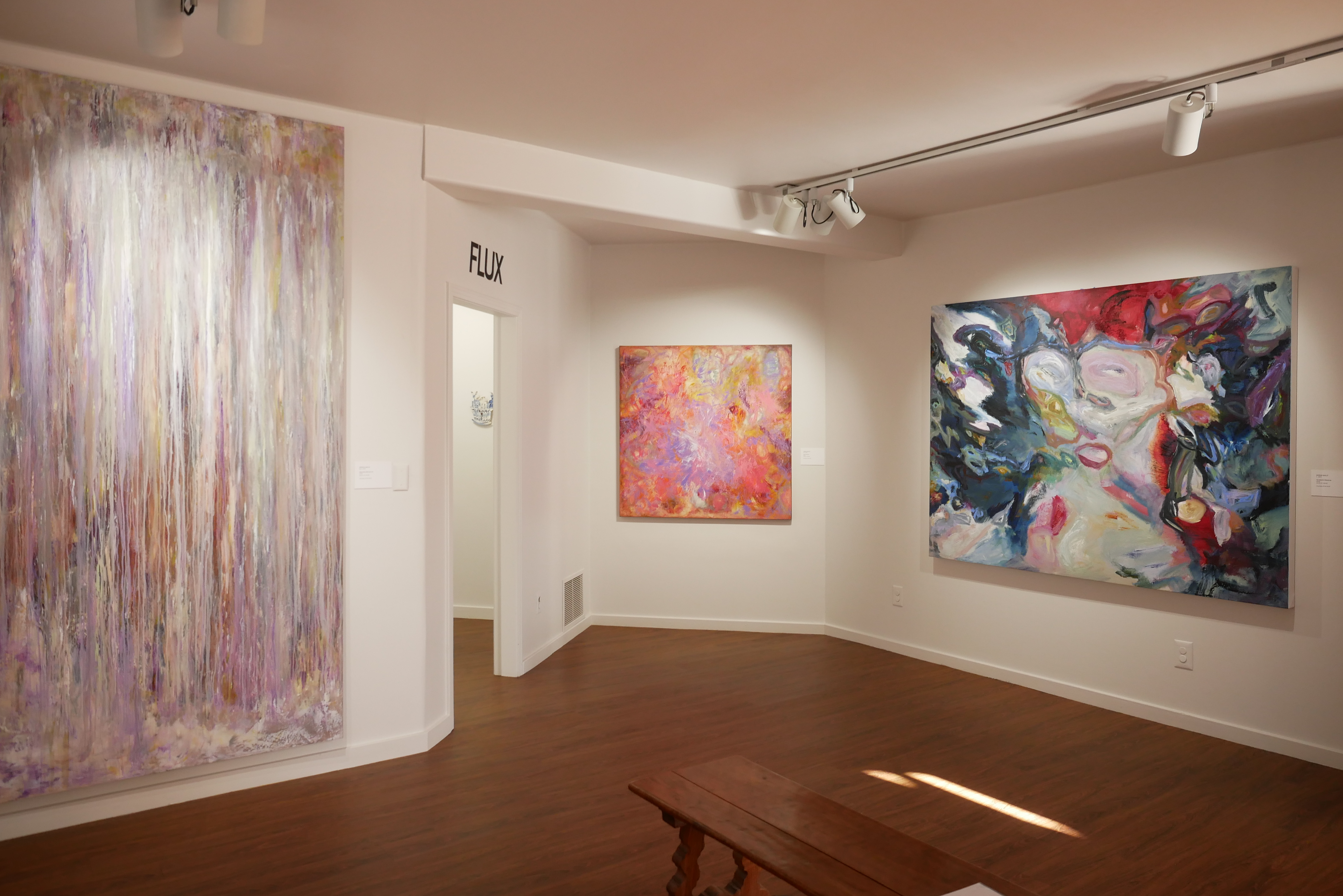
Downstairs gallery

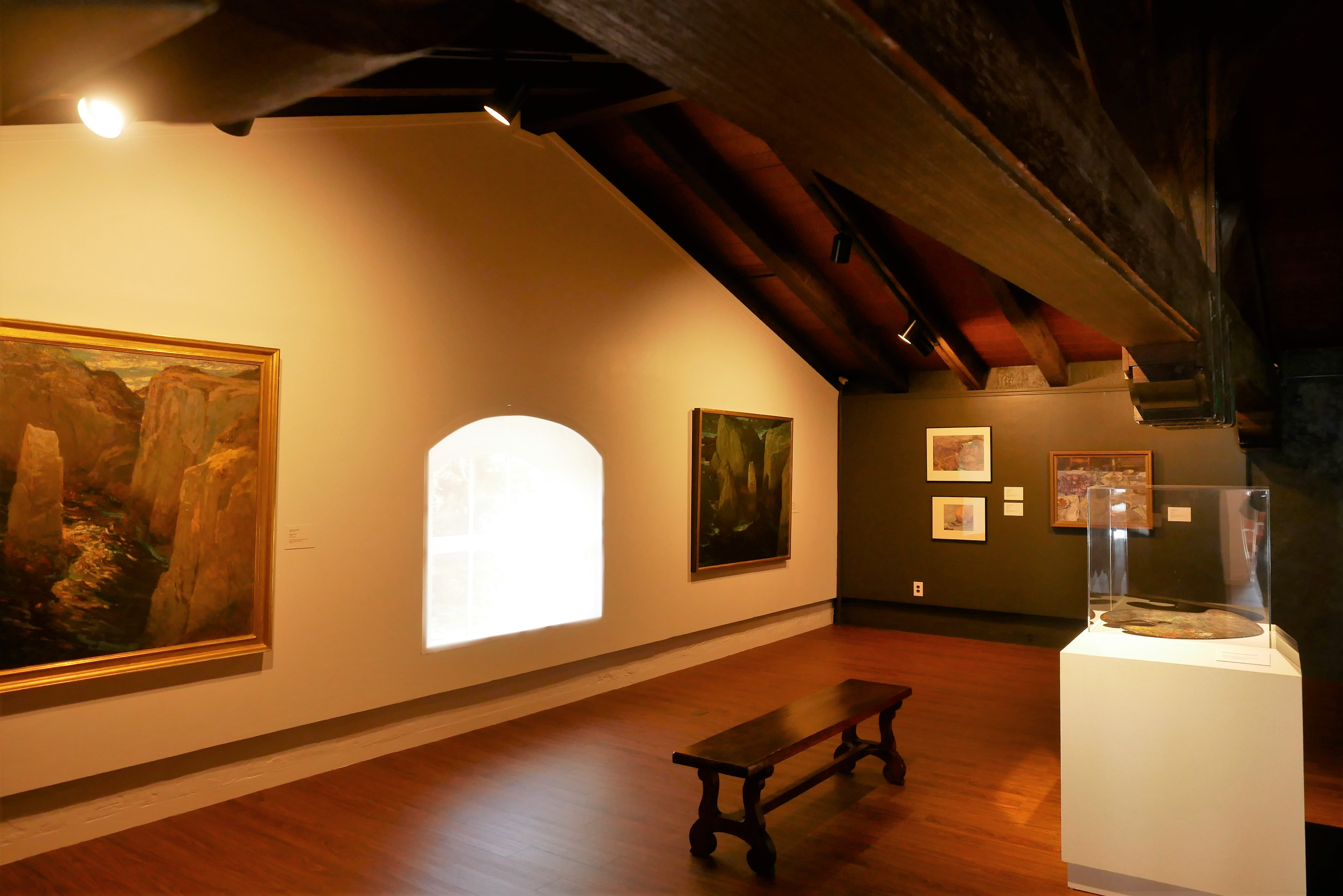
Ritschel Gallery

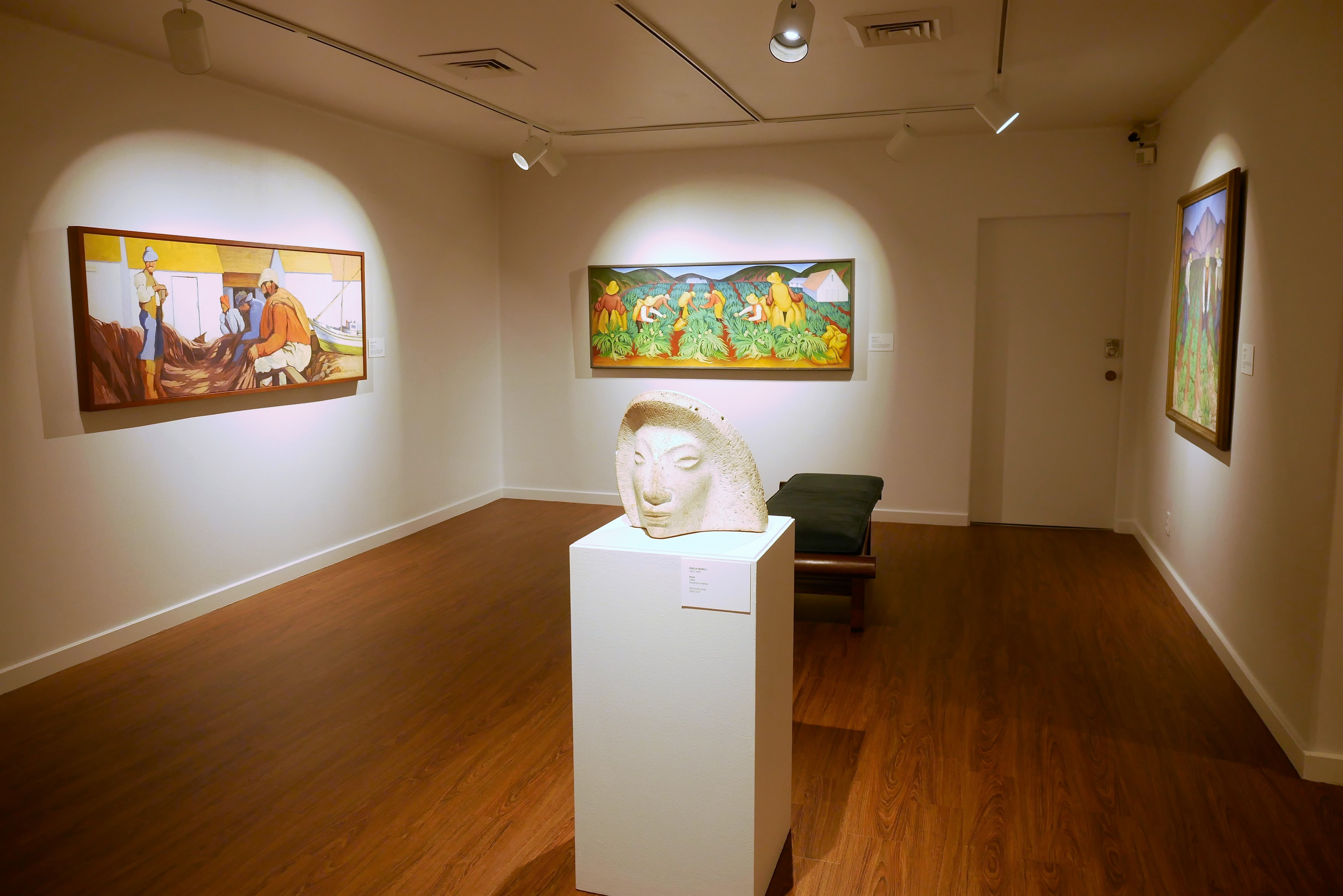
Upstairs gallery

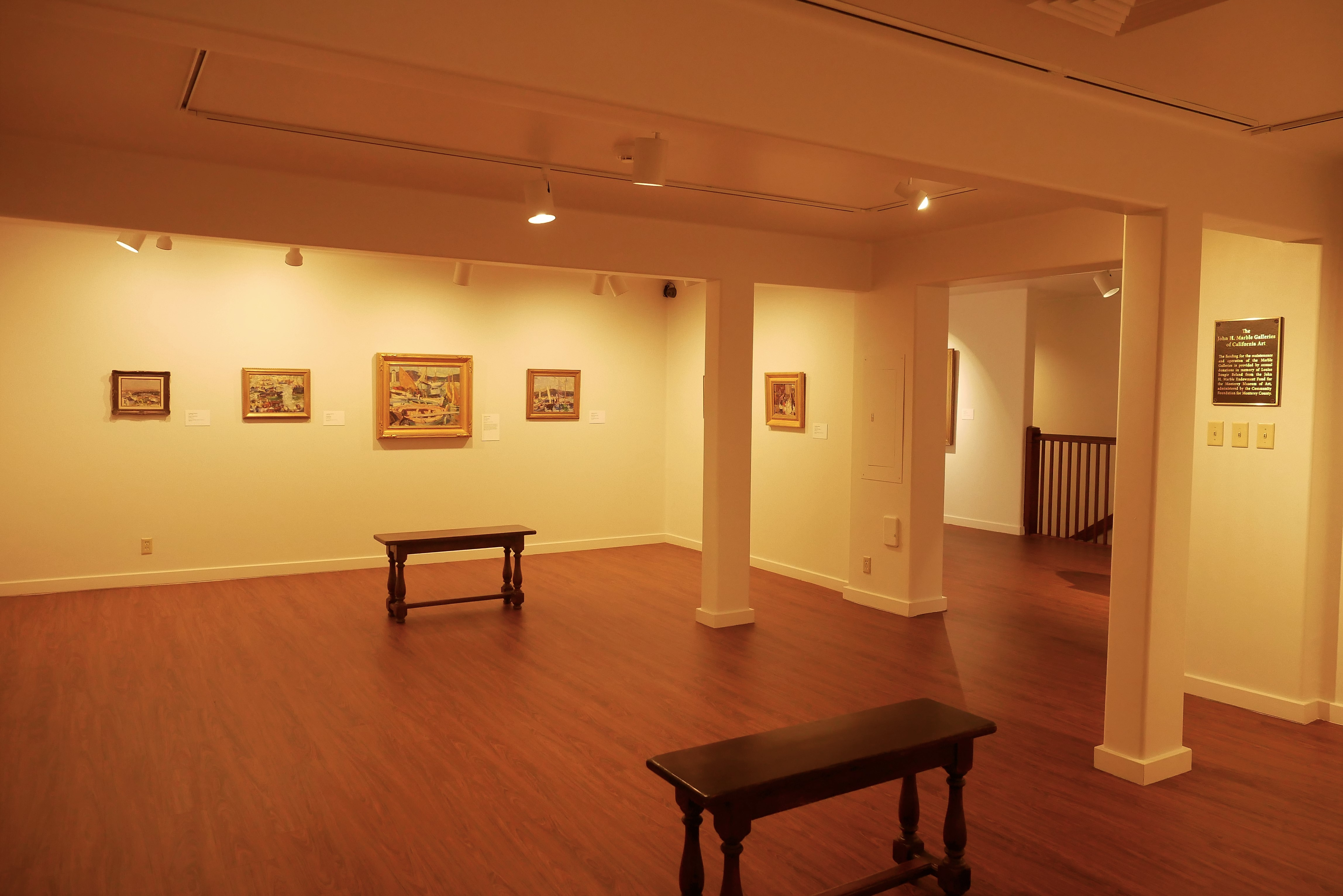
Upstairs gallery
