= Margaret Dobson =

American painter

Margaret Anna Dobson
- Born: November 9, 1888; Baltimore, Maryland
- Died: January 20, 1981 (aged 92); Los Angeles, California
- Known for: Painting, Muralist, Printmaking

Margaret Anna Dobson (November 9, 1888 – January 20, 1981) was an American painter, etcher, illustrator, and muralist born in Baltimore, Maryland.

== Education ==
She studied at the Maryland Institute, the Pennsylvania Academy of the Fine Arts, Palace School of Art in Paris and Syracuse University. At various times she studied with Cecilia Beaux, Emil Carlsen, Daniel Garber, Violet Oakley, and Robert Vonnoh.

== Career ==
While studying in Paris she painted frescos at the Fontainebleau Palace and the Hospital of St. Vincent de Paul, also in Fontainebleau. During the Great Depression Bessemer painted a post office mural in Kaufman, Texas, entitled Driving the Steers, which was later "covered over" or "destroyed".
