= Emil Carlsen =

Danish-American painter (1853–1932)

Soren Emil Carlsen
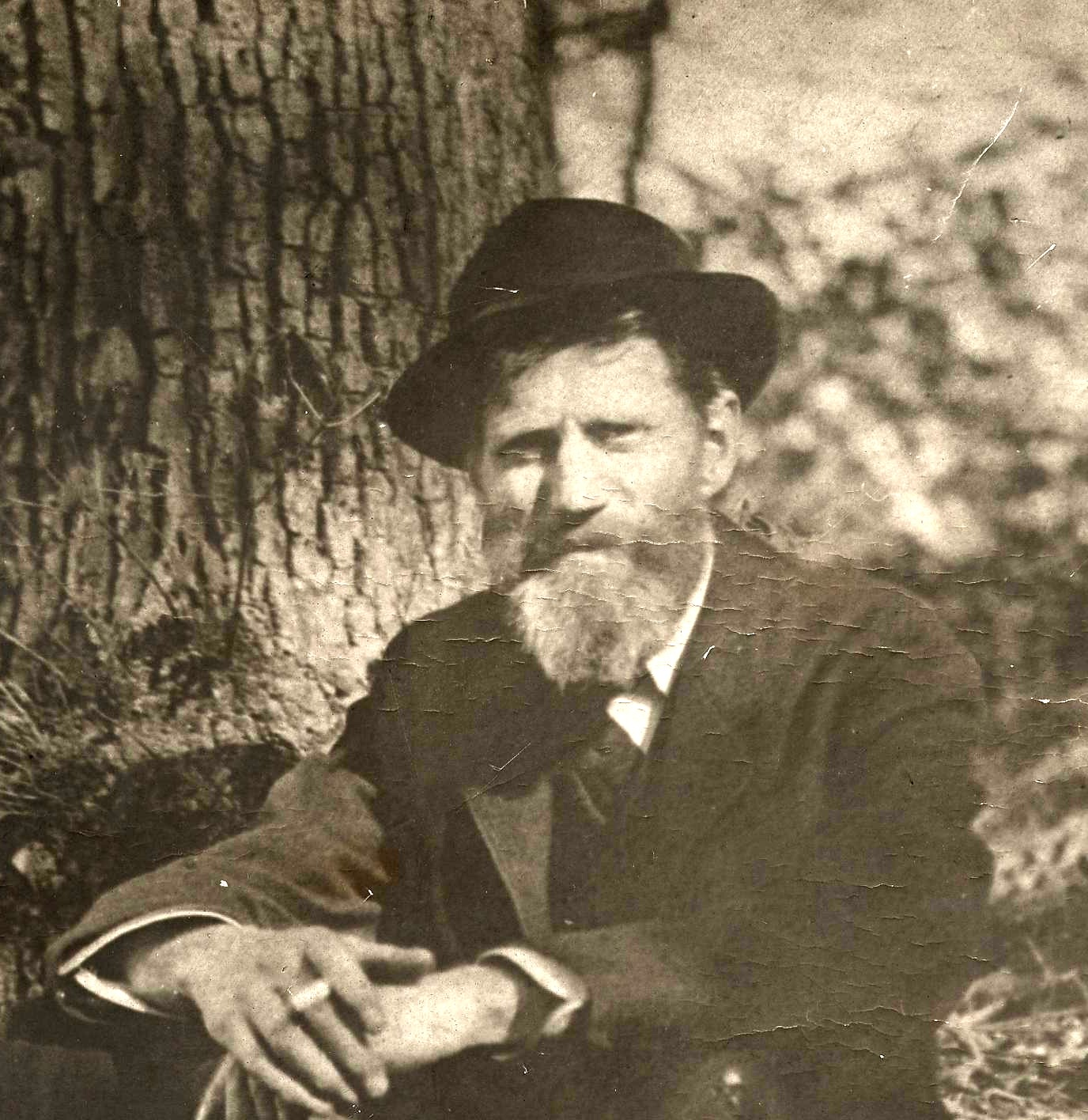
- Soren Emil Carlsen, c. 1910
- Born: October 19, 1848; Copenhagen, Denmark
- Died: January 2, 1932 (aged 83); New York City, United States
- Known for: Landscape painting, still life, marine painting
- Awards: Gold Medal, Louisiana Purchase Exhibition, St. Louis, 1904; Shaw Prize, National Academy of Design, 1904; Medal of Honor, Panama–Pacific International Exposition, San Francisco, California, 1915

Soren Emil Carlsen (October 19, 1848, Copenhagen, Denmark – January 2, 1932, New York City, U.S.) was an American Impressionist painter who emigrated to the United States from Denmark. He became known for his still lifes. Later in his career, Carlsen expanded his range of subjects to include landscapes and seascapes as well.

During his long career, he won many of the most important honors in American art and was elected to membership in the National Academy of Design. For more than forty years he was also a respected teacher in Chicago, San Francisco and New York.

== Early career ==
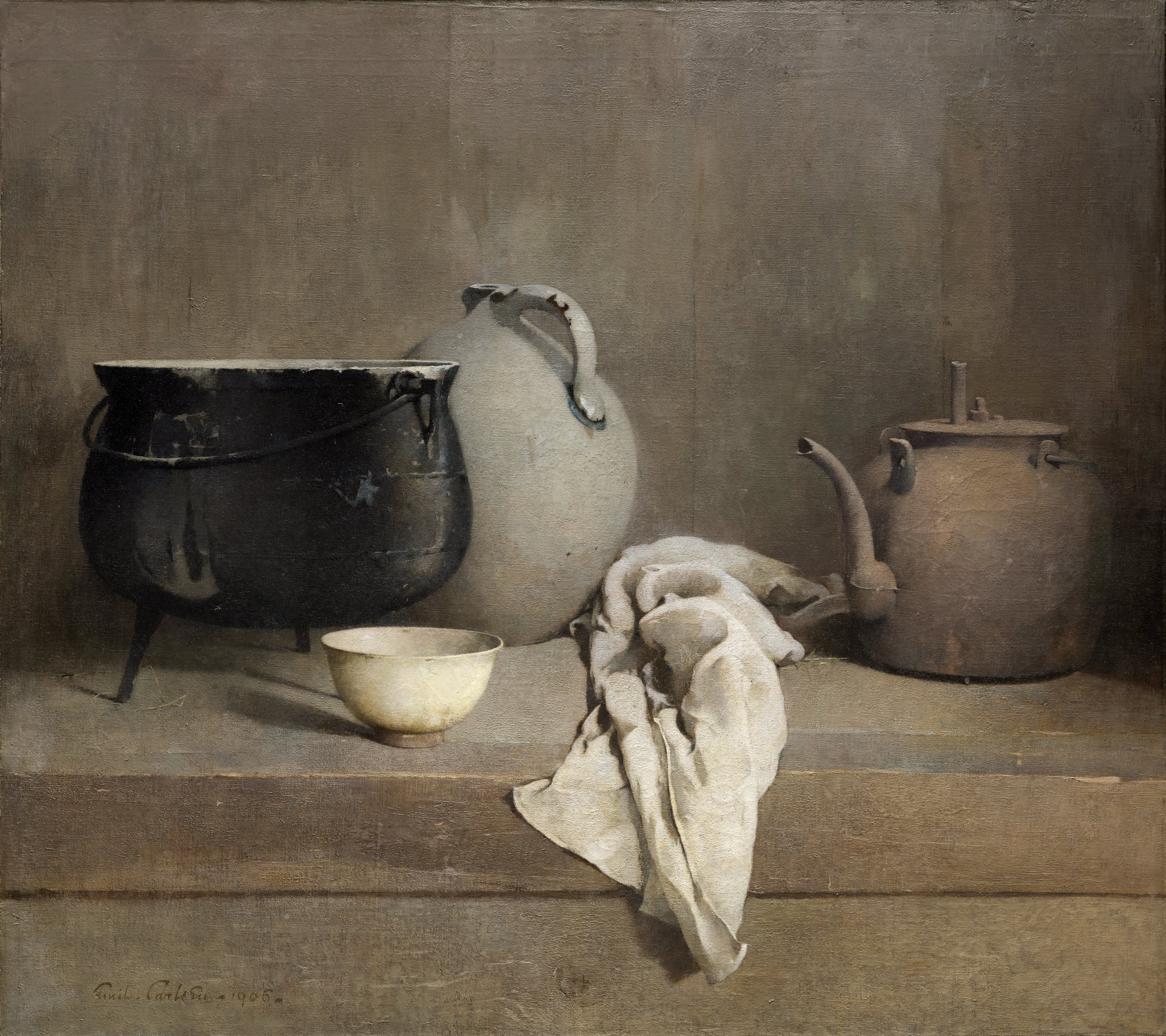
Study in Grey, 1906, Dallas Museum of Art

Emil Carlsen was born and raised in the Danish capital of Copenhagen. He came from an artistic family. His mother painted, and by some accounts, his cousin, who was an influence on him, later became the director of the Danish Royal Academy He studied architecture at the Royal Academy in Copenhagen for four years and then emigrated to the United States in 1872, settling in Chicago, United States. On his arrival in the United States, he changed his birthyear to 1852 or 1853, and the 1853 date has lived on in a number publications where he is mentioned.

Interested in art, he first worked as an architect's assistant and studied with the Danish marine artist Lauritz Holst. However, Holst returned to Denmark, leaving his studio to Carlsen. He made rapid progress and was appointed the first teacher of drawing and painting at the Chicago Academy of Design, Carlsen sought more training and embarked for Paris in 1875, where he came under the influence of the French still life painter Jean-Baptiste-Siméon Chardin. When he returned to the United States, he set up a studio in New York and began to paint tonalist still lifes that were somewhat reminiscent of those of Chardin. However, selling work was still a struggle. After moving to Boston he had a short period of good sales.

He returned to New York and again struggled to sell his paintings. In 1879 he held an auction to help ease his financial situation but ended up selling only a few paintings. This compelled him to give up his studio and take up engraving with which he found some success despite his frustration at not being able to paint full time. These often depicted copper pans, game, or flowers. The acceptance of a still life in the exhibition of the Pennsylvania Academy of Fine Arts in 1883 was the first noteworthy event in his career. In 1884 he returned to Europe, painting commissions of floral still lifes for the dealer, Theron J. Blakeslee, to support his studies. Eventually, he turned his back on the demand for pretty flowers. In 1885 Carlsen had two works accepted for the Paris Salon.

Returning to New York he opened a studio on 57th Street. However, finding that it was still difficult to sell paintings he moved to San Francisco where between 1887 and 1889 he held a position as director of the California School of Design (now San Francisco Art Institute). He became friends with Arthur Mathews, who taught at the School of Design and was the leading figure in the Bay Area Arts and Crafts Movement. He then moved on to teach privately at the San Francisco Art Students League until 1891. During those years he influenced a number of young students, among them were M. Evelyn McCormick and Guy Rose, who both became leading Giverny Impressionists. In 1891, just prior to his departure, Carlsen created a firestorm by openly declaring in one of San Francisco’s leading newspapers that art education was wasted on women who were inferior pupils without self-confidence and who were expected to become school teachers and marry. Arthur Mathews published a spirited rebuttal that provoked further debate.

== Return to the East ==
Carlsen moved back to the East from California in 1891, and began a long career of teaching in the East. He taught at the National Academy of Design, at the student-founded Art Student's League, and the Pennsylvania Academy of Fine Arts. Gradually, through his relationship with other New York-based painters and teachers such as John Twachtman and Julian Alden Weir, he became interested in painting landscapes and marines. Carlsen sketched in Connecticut in the early 1900s, visiting his friend Weir in Branchville, Fairfield County, Connecticut. This became the famous "Weir Farm" where many American Impressionists painted landscapes en plein-air.

The Carlsens and their young son Dines spent several summers living in a cottage on the farm. The artists would paint during the day and socialize in the evening. Carlsen purchased a home in Falls Village, Connecticut in 1905 and the Carlsen family spent most of their time there when Carlsen did not have teaching commitments in New York. Falls Village is in the Berkshire Foothills and Carlsen painted the rolling foothills and the forests of the Berkshire Mountains.

== Success and respect ==
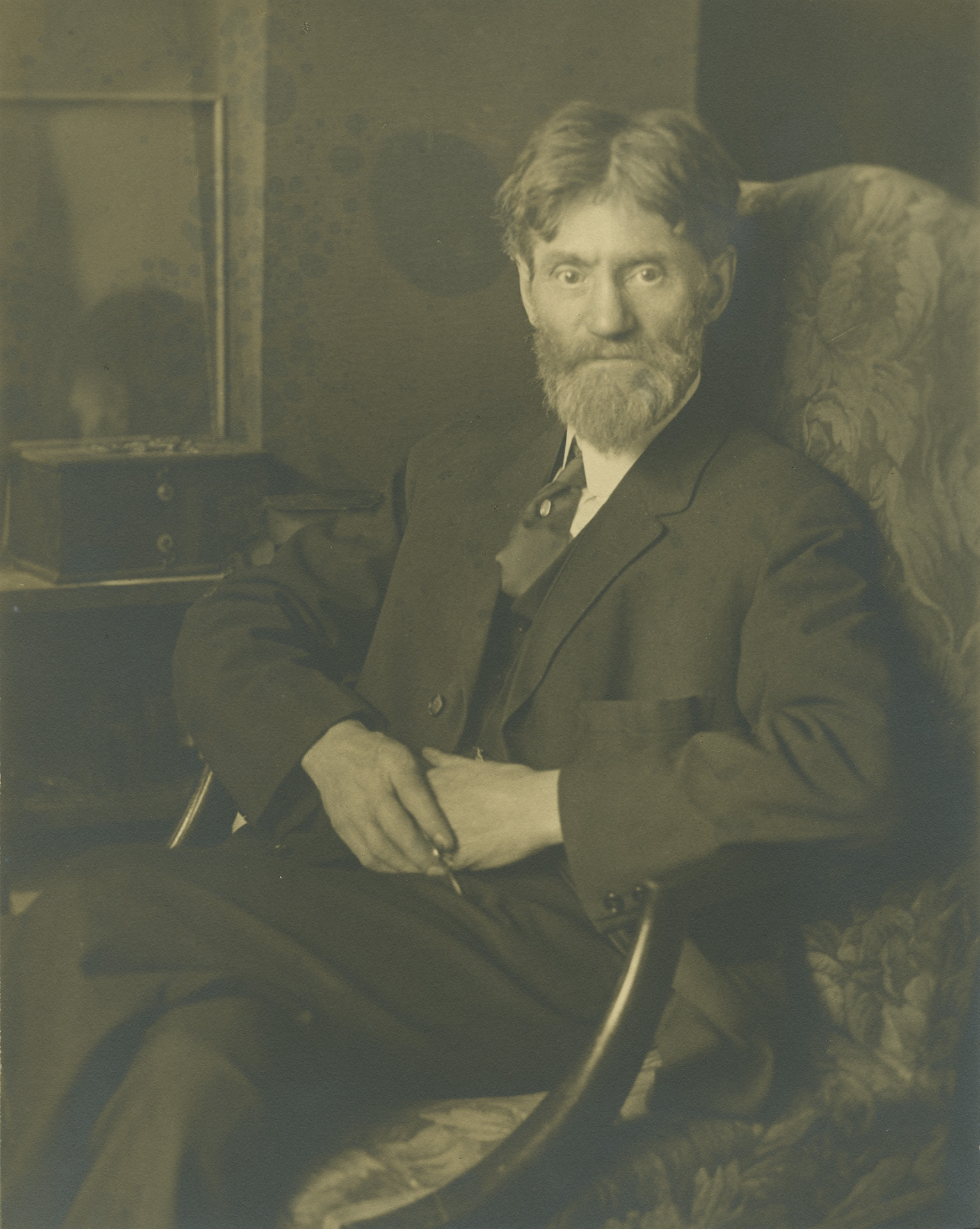
Emil Carlsen, c.1905, silver print, Department of Image Collections, National Gallery of Art Library, Washington, DC

Although he was considered to be one of the most respected American painters, Carlsen struggled financially for the first several decades of his career. The Macbeth Gallery in New York was the first gallery that specialized in the work of American artists. After Carlsen joined the gallery, which represented many of the American Impressionist artists, his sales improved and for the first time he was able to live comfortably without constant financial stress. He had solo exhibitions at Macbeth in 1912, 1919 and 1921 and 1923.

He received the Samuel T. Shaw Purchase Prize at the National Academy of Design.

== Teaching career ==
Emil Carlsen was a sought after teacher and financial necessity drove him to teach more than he wanted, taking time away from his painting. As he became more financially successful, he cut back on his teaching commitments. He taught the life class at the National Academy of Design from 1905 to 1909. He commuted from New York to Philadelphia to lecture at the Pennsylvania Academy of Fine Arts for many years. Among his pupils was the miniaturist Rosa Hooper.

== Personal life ==
Emil Carlsen married Luela Mary Ruby in 1896 and the couple moved into his 59th Street studio, where they made their home for the remainder of their lives. They had a single child, Dines Carlsen in 1901 who was home schooled. His mother taught him scholastic subjects and his father instructed him in art. Dines Carlsen began his own exhibition career in 1914, exhibiting a still life at the National Academy of Design when he was thirteen. Dines Carlsen was made an Associate National Academician in 1922, when he was 21, and a full Academician in 1942. Dines Carlsen exhibited alongside his father at the Grand Central Galleries in New York. He had three solo exhibitions at that gallery. After Dines Carlsen died in 1966, Grand Central Galleries held a dual retrospective exhibition to honor both artists. Carlsen was close friends with Julian Alden Weir, John Twachtman and Childe Hassam.

== Artistic philosophy ==
In 1908, Carlsen published an article on still life painting for the now obscure art journal Palette and Bench where he wrote of the low status of still lifes:

... still life painting is considered of small importance in the Art schools, both here and abroad, the usual course being drawn from the antique, the nude, and painting the draped figure and from the nude. ... Then why should the earnest student overlook the simplest and most thorough way of acquiring all the knowledge of the craft of painting and drawing, the study of inanimate objects, still life painting, the very surest road to absolute mastery over all technical difficulties.

== Critical responses ==
Professor William Gerdts wrote extensively of Carlsen and his aesthetic sensibility in his book on American still life painting "Painters of the Humble Truth" and he describes the objects in the paintings as

... often lacking in traditional beauty, What makes the paintings beautiful is Carlsen's sensitivity in arrangement - large shapes are juxtaposed with small flat forms and tall ones, their outlines are often united in refined harmonious curves. and are placed backward and forward on their limited support surface to allow for "breathing room," for slow movement in space.

The art historian Richard Boyle also noted Carlsen's craftsmanship, in his book American Impressionism, states:

Carlesen's special concern was still life, and his paintings are beautifully crafted and delicate of surface, reminiscent of Whistler and especially Dewing. Carlsen was concerned with "ideal beauty" as well as the beauty inherent in the subject, in texture and color; as in Dewing's works, the placement of the objects on his canvas is extremely important ...

The art writer Arthur Edwin Bye featured Carlsen most prominently in his survey of American Still life painting in 1921 and wrote of him:

Emil Carlsen is unquestionably the most accomplished master of still-life painting in America today. ... It is evident that Carlsen has lifted his art to a height it has never reached before."

In American Impressionism, William Gerdts wrote about Carlsen's transition from still life artist to landscape painter:

Carlsen was attracted to the beauties of the rolling hills and interpreted them in soft, pastel tones. Carlsen's landscape mode, however, is more completely of this century, and it developed in the more decorative, somewhat naturalistic manner that characterized later Impressionism.

The art collector Duncan Phillips wrote of Carlsen that his ocean scenes had "a certain trance-like mood."

== Students ==
- Frederick Becker
- Mary Brady
- Edith Maurice Bregy
- Anne Bremer
- Claude Buck
- Elbridge Ayer Burbank
- Jay Hall Connaway
- Katherine Langdon Corson
- Edwin Deakin
- Anna Parker Dixwell
- Margaret Anna Dobson
- Maren Froelich
- Wilhelmina Weber Furlong
- Alice Hapgood Hathaway Goodwin Earle
- John M. Gamble
- Percy Gray
- Charles W. Hargens Jr.
- Abraham Harriton
- Margaret Cox Herrick
- Isabel Hunter
- Helen Hyde
- Elsa Laubach Jemne
- Helen Elizabeth Keep
- William Keith
- Andrew Loomis
- Louis Lozowick
- Ethel Marcy
- Marie Evelyn McCormick
- Jane Roma McElroy
- Lola Sleeth Miller
- Charlotte Bodwell Morgan
- Mary DeNeale Morgan
- Benjamin Franklin Norris Jr.
- Eric Pape
- Ernest Clifford Peixotto
- Hugo Robus
- Guy Rose
- Geneve Rixford Sargeant
- Carl Schmitt
- Harry Seawell
- James Guilford Swinnerton
- Jesse Bryon Trefethen
- Gustave Verbeek

== Memberships ==
- The National Academy of Design, New York
- The Bohemian Club, San Francisco, California
- Salmagundi Club, New York, New York

== Awards ==
- De Neuhausenske Præmier, 1869
- Gold Medal, Louisiana Purchase Exposition, St. Louis, 1904
- Shaw Prize, National Academy of Design
- Medal of Honor, Panama–Pacific International Exposition, San Francisco, California, 1915

== Museum collections ==
- Art Institute of Chicago, Chicago, Illinois
- The Dayton Art Institute, Dayton, Ohio ("Iron Kettle with Onions" c. 1925)
- Akron Art Museum, Akron, OH ("Rhages Jar" date unknown)
- De Young Museum, San Francisco, California
- Bohemian Club, San Francisco, California
- National Museum of American Art, Smithsonian Institution, Washington, D.C.
- Metropolitan Museum of Art, New York, New York
- Chicago Historical Society, Chicago, Illinois
- Brooklyn Museum of Art, Brooklyn New York
- Montclair Art Museum, Montclair, New Jersey
- Nashville Parthenon, Nashville, Tennessee
- Pennsylvania Academy of Fine Art, Philadelphia, Pennsylvania
- Oakland Museum of California, Oakland, California
- Santa Barbara Museum of Art, Santa Barbara, California;
- Frye Art Museum, Seattle, Washington
- San Diego Museum of Art, San Diego, California
- Butler Art Institute, Youngstown, Ohio ("The Surf" 1907)
- Columbus Museum, Columbus, Georgia
- Bruce Museum, Greenwich, Connecticut
- El Paso Museum of Art, El Paso, Texas

== See also ==
- American Impressionism
- Tonal Impressionism
- California Tonalism
- French Impressionism
- Tonalism
