= Eric Pape =

American painter

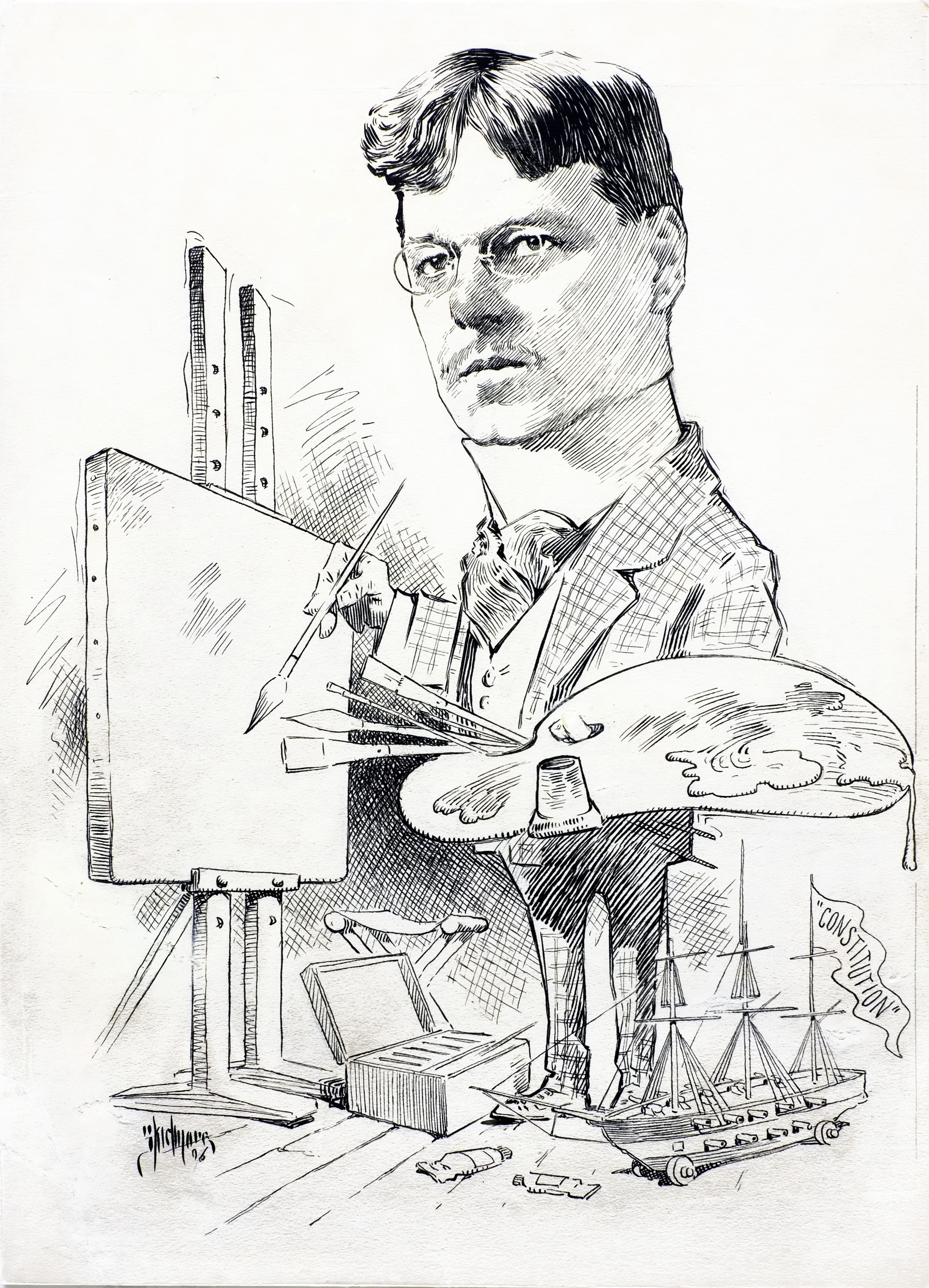
- Eric Pape by T. D. Skidmore in Pearson's Magazine, 1908
- Born: Frederich Ludwig Moritz Pape Jr. October 17, 1870; San Francisco, California, U.S.
- Died: November 7, 1938 (aged 68); New York City, New York, U.S.
- Education: Emil Carlsen, Jules Joseph Lefebvre, Jean-Léon Gérôme, Benjamin Constant
- Known for: Painting, illustration, sculpture
- Website: https://ericpape.com/

Frederich Ludwig Moritz Pape Jr. (October 17, 1870 – November 7, 1938), known as Eric Pape, was an American painter, engraver, sculptor, and illustrator.

== Early life ==
Pape was born in San Francisco, California, on October 17, 1870, to Friederich Ludwig and Maria (Meier) Pape.

== Career ==
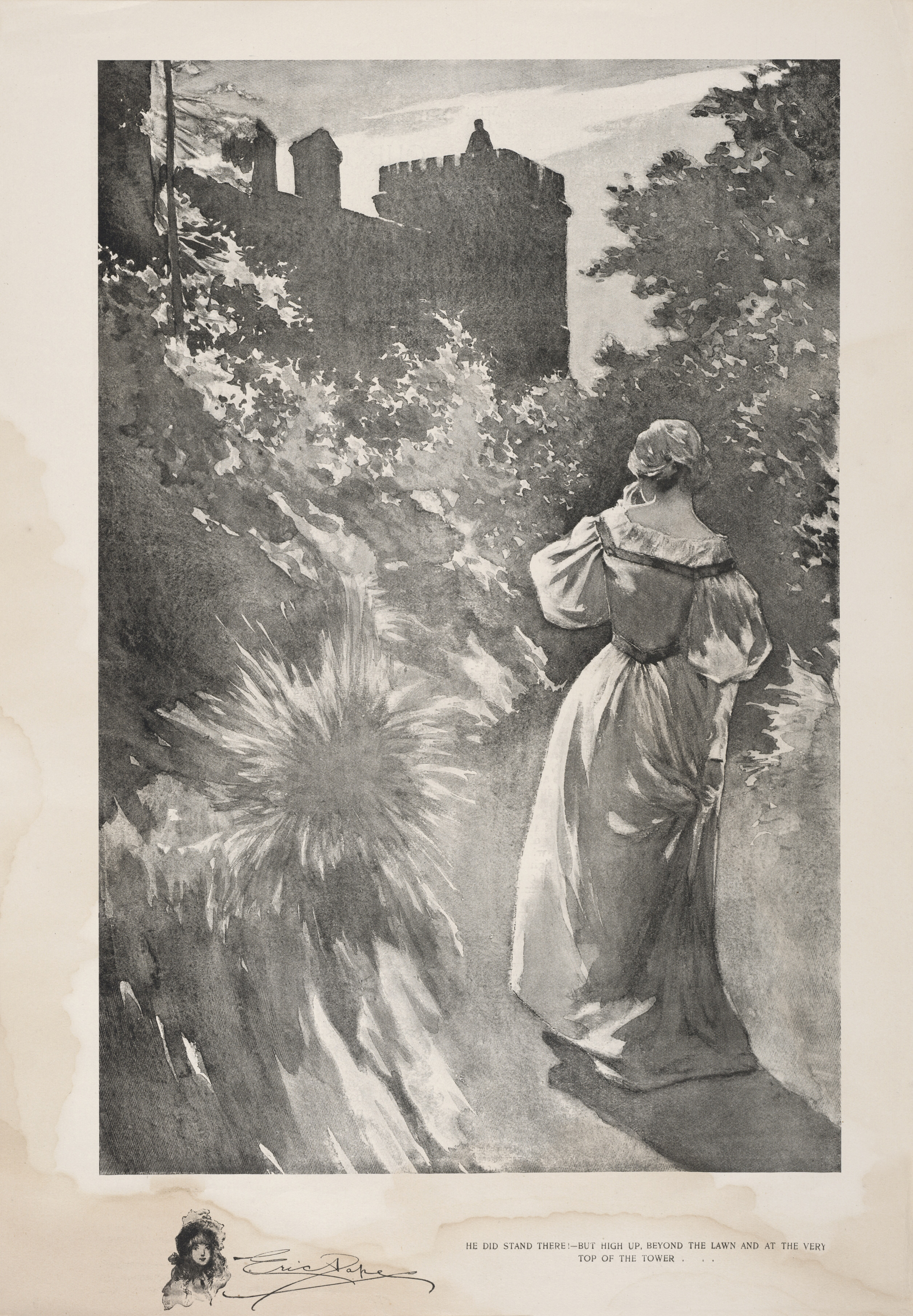
Illustration for Henry James' The Turn of the Screw, 1898

In his teens, Pape studied at the San Francisco School of Design under Emil Carlsen. He left the United States in 1888 for France where he studied in Paris at the Ecole des Beaux Arts under Jean-Léon Gérôme, and at the Académie Julian. He also studied with Jules Joseph Lefebvre and Benjamin Constant at their private studios.

Pape traveled extensively while in Europe. In 1889, he lived for a year in northern Germany among peasants and created his first large Salon painting, The Young Spinner of Zeven, which was exhibited the following year at the Société Nationale des Beaux-Arts. The painting was awarded a medal at the California Midwinter International Exposition of 1894.

Pape enjoyed a rapid rise to fame. In 1890, he traveled to Egypt where he lived and worked for two years. For nine months he lived beside the Great Pyramids and Sphinx, extensively studying and drawing the ancient monuments. Pape also traveled the Nile River and trekked into the Sahara Desert while living in Egypt. His works were exhibited in Paris; in Egypt at the Exposition du Caire; and in Chicago at the 1893 World's Columbian Exposition ("The Site of Ancient Memphis" and "The Great Sphinx by Moonlight").

Pape returned to the United States in 1894 and married illustrator Alice Monroe in Boston, Massachusetts on August 16. They had one son, Moritz Pape. Alice died in 1911. Nine years later, he married Alice Byrne in 1920.

Pape taught for one year at the Cowles Art School in Boston. In 1898, he established the Eric Pape School of Art in Boston. Among its many students were N. C. Wyeth. His works continued to be exhibited internationally, and he was afforded the privilege of one-man shows at the Detroit Museum of Art, the Cincinnati Museum of Art, and the Saint Louis Museum of Art.

In 1901, Pape was invited to exhibit 97 of his paintings in the Palace of American Archaeology and Ethnology at the Pan-American Exposition in Buffalo; he won a medal for the collection. Continuing to rise in fame and popularity, Pape's works were also exhibited at the Society of American Artists, the Pennsylvania Academy of the Fine Arts, the Art Institute of Chicago, and the National Academy of Design.

Although highly prolific in fine arts, Pape also became a successful illustrator. He regularly illustrated articles for magazines, such as Scribner's Magazine, Cosmopolitan, and The Century Magazine, and Woman's World. Pape also illustrated a large number of deluxe edition books, including The Poems of Madison Cawein (1907) in five volumes; Henry James', The Turn of the Screw, (1898); a special two-volume edition of Lew Wallace's The Fair God (1898) which included 272 illustrations. Pape traveled to Mexico for the book's illustrations.

Additionally, Pape worked as a stage designer for theatrical productions, most notably for Percy Mackaye's Canterbury Pilgrims, which was performed in honor of President William H. Taft at Gloucester, Massachusetts, in 1909. In 1898, Pape designed the sets for one of the earliest productions of "Trilby".

In 1906, Pape designed and released a petition from Massachusetts to the U.S. Congress to preserve the USS Constitution. This illuminated scroll is now on display in the National Museum of the United States Navy in Washington, D.C.. The following year Pape designed a bronze memorial to commemorate the founding of Massachusetts Bay Colony, which was dedicated in 1907 at Gloucester, Massachusetts.

== Professional and social organizations ==
Pape was a member of the United Arts Club of London and a Fellow of the Royal Society of Arts. He was also a member of "The Players" organization, having been recommended for membership by Mark Twain.

== Death and legacy ==
According to Pape's obituary in The New York Times, he was walking along Eighth Avenue near Fortieth Street in New York City on November 4, 1938, when he collapsed from a heart attack. He was taken to City Hospital on Welfare Island where he remained unconscious until his death three days later.

Pape's works are widely held in museum collections including the National Portrait Gallery of the Smithsonian Institution, the Library of Congress, the U.S. Naval Academy Museum in Annapolis, Maryland, the National Portrait Gallery in London and many other locations.

== Selected works ==
- The Young Spinner of Zeven
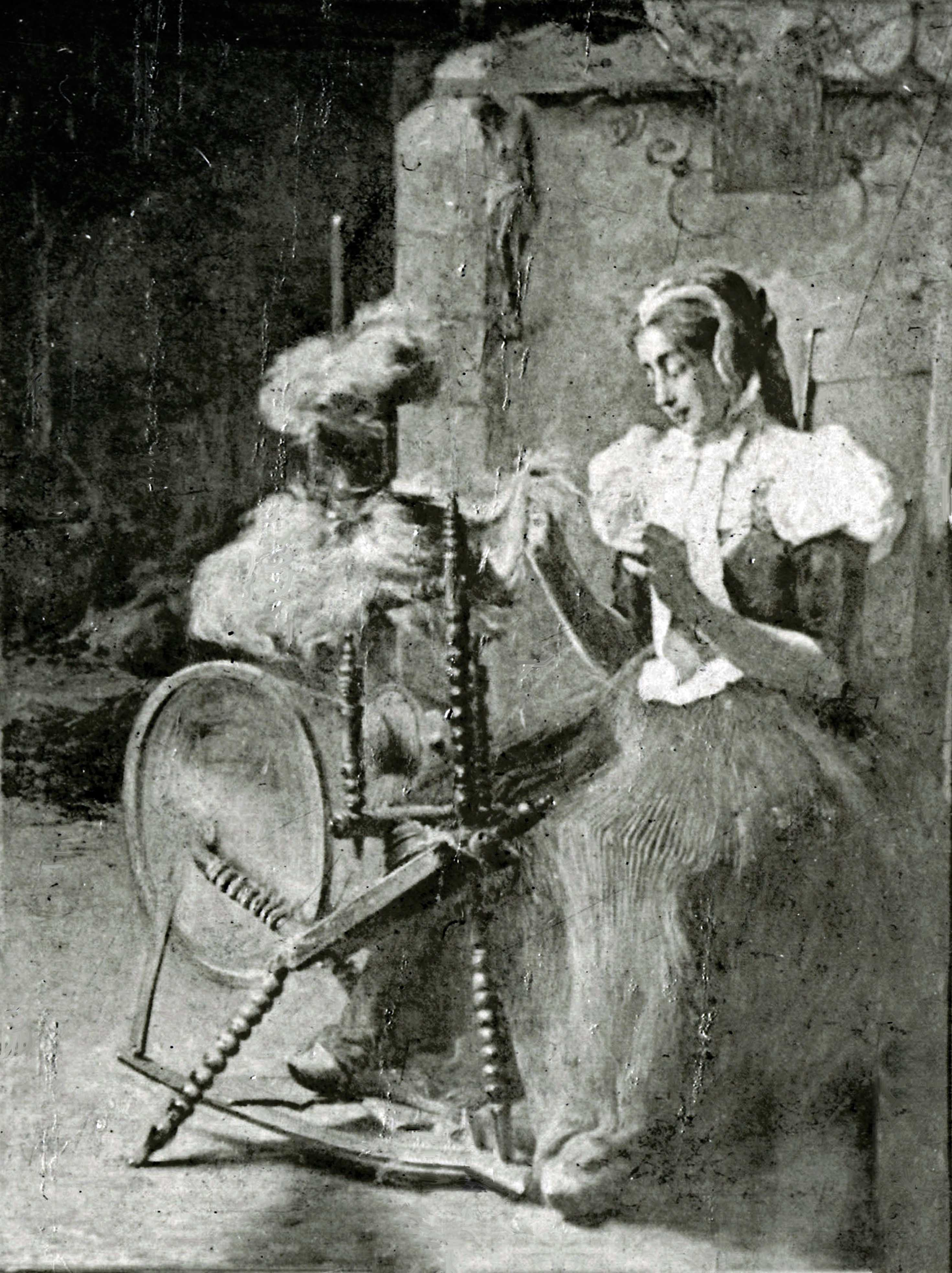
  Young Spinner of Zeven An original photograph of the artwork found in the studio of Eric Pape after his death
- The Great Sphinx by Moonlight
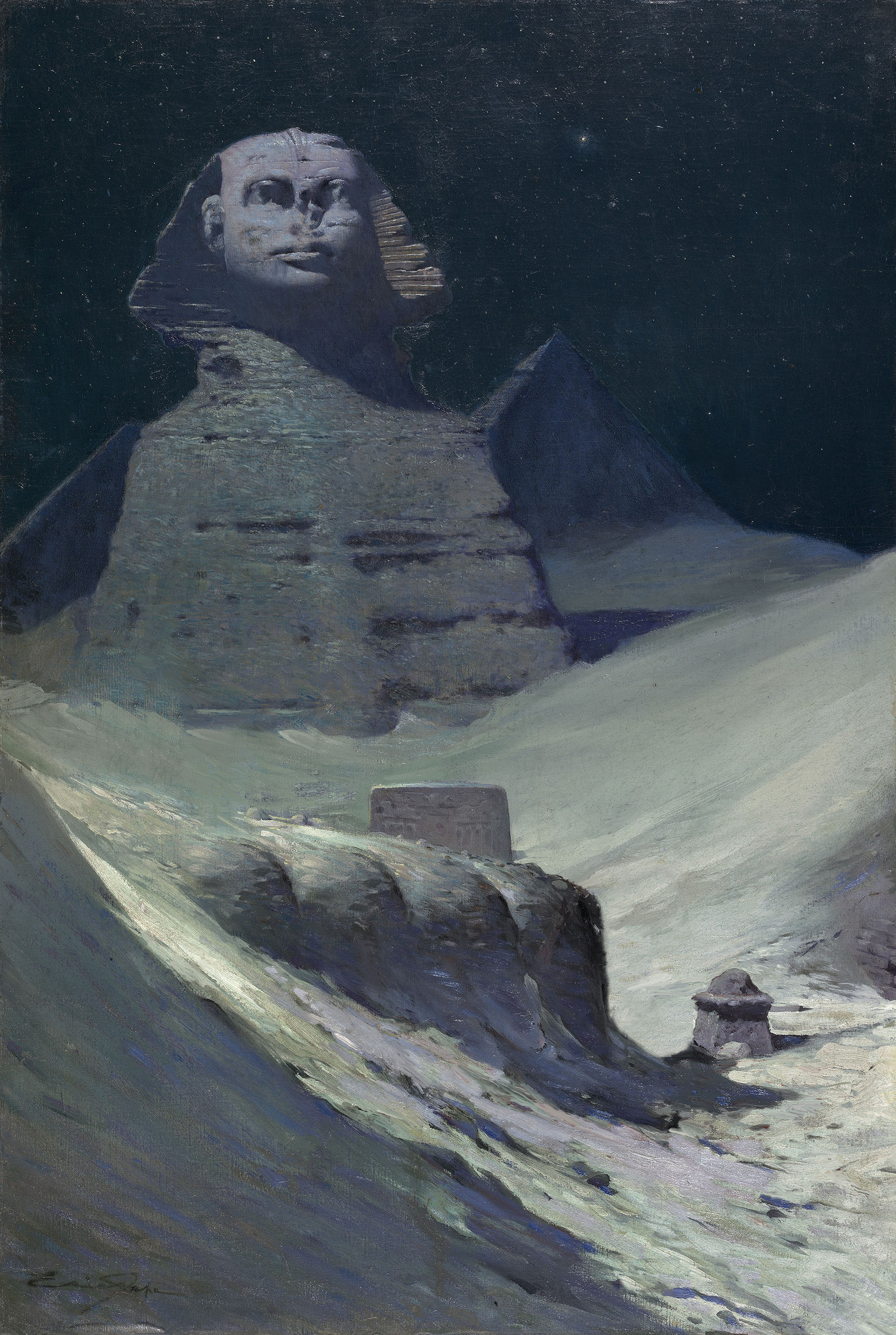
  Great Sphinx By Moonlight, Oil on canvas, circa 1890
- The Site of Ancient Memphis
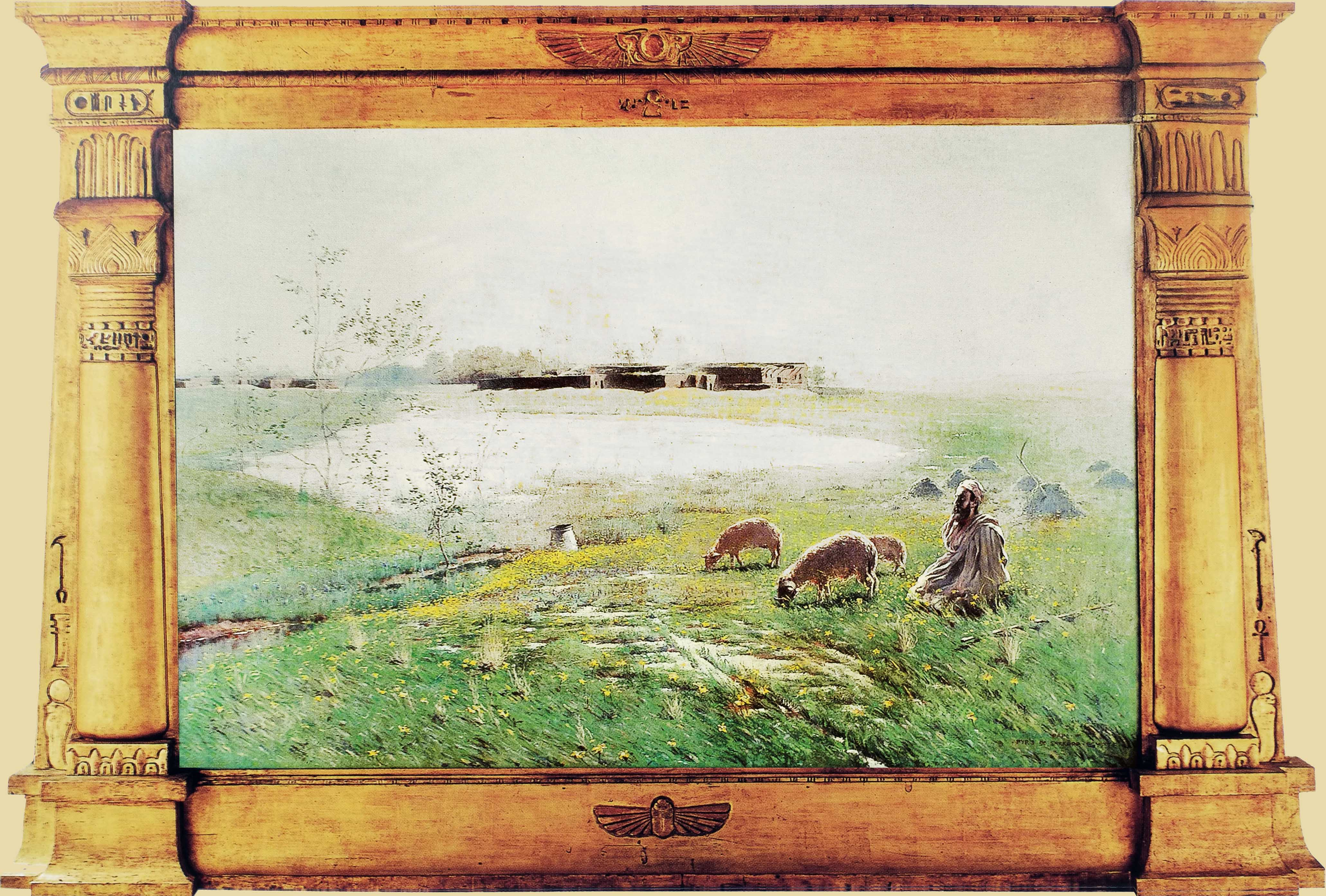
  Site of Ancient Memphis by Eric Pape
- The Two Great Eras
- Angel with the Book of Life
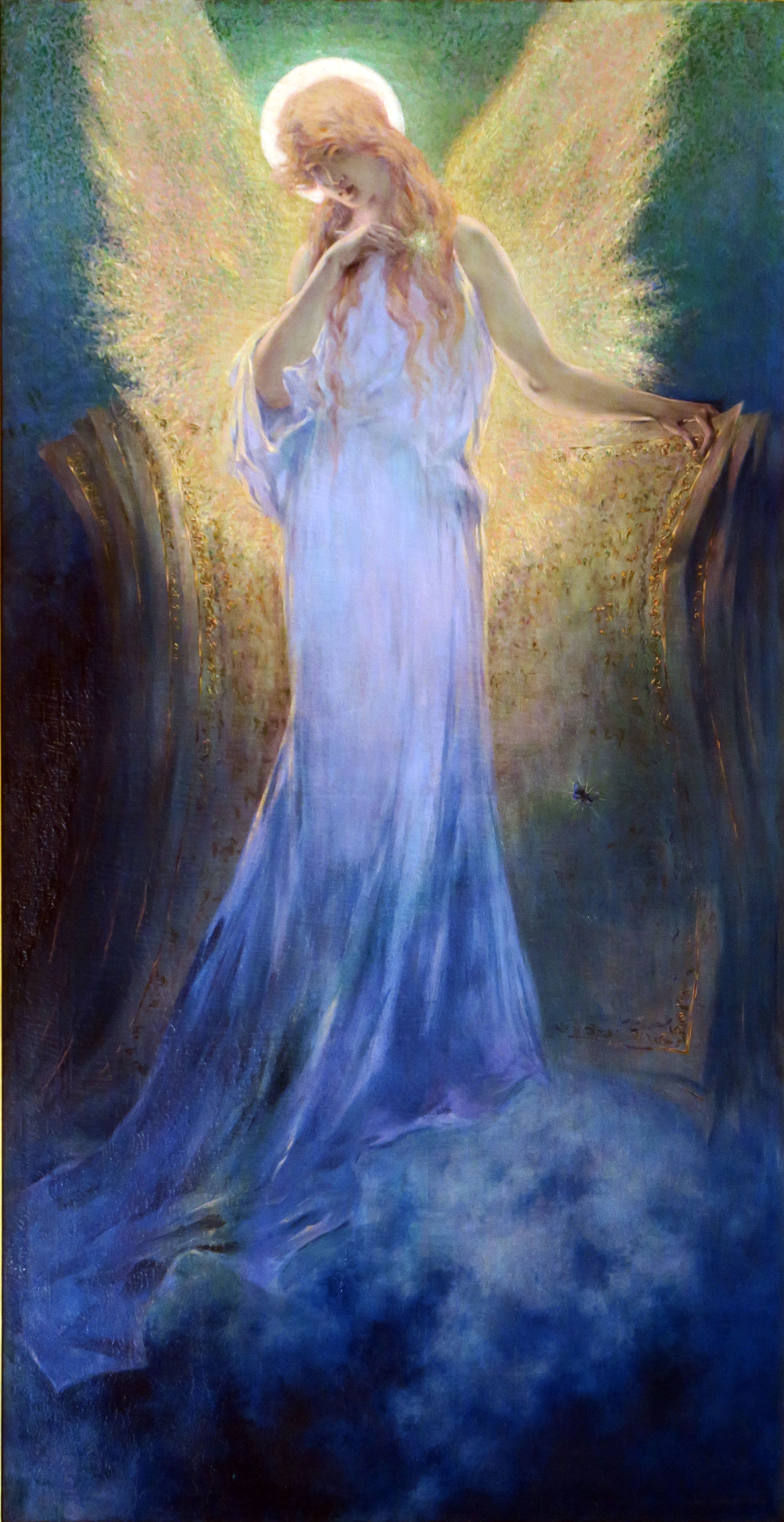
  Angel with the Book of Life. Exhibited Munchen International Kunst Anstelling Munich 1897
- The Foaming Surges

== See also ==
- National Museum of American Illustration

== Bibliography ==
- Armstrong, Regina. "An American Painter, Eric Pape", The International Studio, 12:66 (Aug 1902) p. 83-89.
- Morrell, Dora M. "Eric Pape, Painter and Illustrator", Brush and Pencil, 3:6 (Mar 1899) p. 321-331.
- Conn, Gregory "Eric Pape and The Players", 2022, ISBN 979-8-9866461-0-7
- Conn, Gregory "Eric Pape at Hammond Castle Museum" 2023 ISBN 979-8-9866461-1-4
- Conn, Gregory "Eric Pape in the New York Herald Tribune", 2024 ISBN 979-8-9866461-2-1
