= Jane Roma McElroy =

American painter

- Born: 1867; San Francisco, California
- Died: 1923 (aged 55–56); San Francisco, California
- Known for: Painting

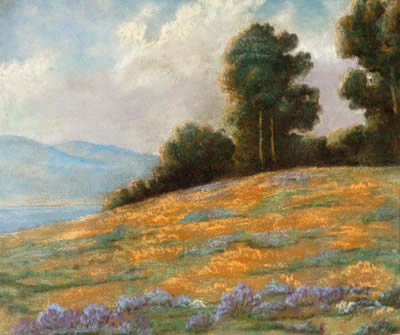
untitled by Jane Roma McElroy

Jane (Jennie) Roma McElroy (1867-1923) was an American painter.

== Biography ==
McElroy was born in 1867 in San Francisco, California. She attended the Mark Hopkins Institute of Art at the California School of Design. Her professors included Emil Carlsen and Raymond Dabb Yelland.

McElroy exhibited her paintings at the California State Fair in 1890 and 1891, the California Midwinter International Exposition of 1894, the San Francisco Art Association from 1896 through 1917, the San Francisco Mechanics' Institute in 1899, the San Francisco Sketch Club from 1907 through 1912, and the San Francisco Sequoia Club in 1909. She also exhibited her work at the California State Building at the 1893 World's Columbian Exposition in Chicago, Illinois.

McElroy died in San Francisco in 1923. She never married.
