= Guy Rose =

American painter (1867–1925)

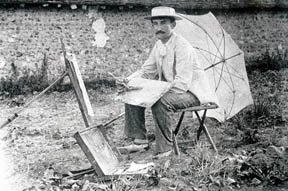
- Rose in Giverny, 1890
- Born: Guy Orlando Rose; March 3, 1867; San Gabriel, California, U.S.
- Died: November 17, 1925 (aged 58); Pasadena, California, U.S.
- Education: Los Angeles High School; San Francisco Art Institute; Académie Julian
- Occupation: American Impressionist painter
- Parent(s): Leonard John Rose; Amanda Jones

Guy Orlando Rose (March 3, 1867 – November 17, 1925) was an American Impressionist painter and California resident, who received national recognition in the late 19th and early 20th centuries.

== Early life and education ==
Guy Orlando Rose was born March 3, 1867, in San Gabriel, California. He was the seventh child of Leonard John Rose and Amanda Jones Rose. His father was a prominent California senator. He and his wife raised their large family on an expansive Southern California ranch and vineyard – the San Gabriel Valley town of Rosemead bears the family name.

In 1876, Rose was accidentally shot in the face during a hunting trip with his brothers, he was only nine years old. While recuperating, he began to sketch and use watercolors and oil paints. He graduated from Los Angeles High School in 1884. After graduation, he moved to San Francisco where he studied art between 1885 and 1888 at the San Francisco Art Association's California School of Design with Virgil Williams, Warren E. Rollins, and the Danish-born artist Emil Carlsen. In 1886, he received honorable mentions in both drawing and oil painting; a year later he was given the school's coveted Avery Gold Medal in oil painting and contributed a still life with “excellent tone” to the Winter Annual of the San Francisco Art Association.

On September 12, 1888, Rose enrolled at the Académie Julian in Paris and studied with Benjamin-Constant, Jules Lefebvre, Lucien Doucet, and Jean-Paul Laurens while in Paris. In 1888–89, he won a scholarship at the Académie Delacluse and contributed religious and figural studies as well as landscapes to the Paris Salons in 1890, 1891, 1894, 1900, and 1909. He met fellow students, the brothers Frank and Frederick DuMond, at the Académie Julian.

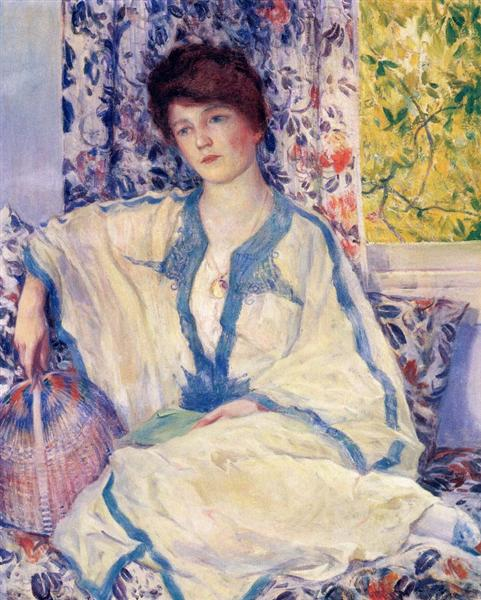
A portait of presumably Guy Rose's wife Ethel during their summer stay in Carmel in 1920 in which she wears an Algerian garment that was previously seen in one his earlier works from his visit to Algeria

== Career ==
Rose lived in New York City, New York, in the 1890s and illustrated for Harper's, Scribners, and Century. Choosing to return to France in 1899, he and his wife Ethel bought a cottage at Giverny. In 1900, he resided in Paris and spent the winter in Briska, Algeria, where he painted three paintings one of which was Portrait of an Algerian.

From 1913 to 1914, the Roses summered in and held an outdoor sketching school at Narragansett, Rhode Island.

Suffering on and off again from the effects of lead poisoning, Rose and his wife moved permanently to Los Angeles, California, in 1914.

Between 1918 and 1920, the Roses not only painted in Carmel-by-the-Sea, California, as summer residents, they became exhibiting members of the local art colony. In 1919, they leased the Carmel cottage of artist Alice Comins. Guy's oils appeared at the Thirteenth and Fourteenth Annual Exhibitions of the Carmel Arts and Crafts Club in 1919 and 1920. At the latter, he displayed The Beach and The Point. In the fall of 1921, his two Carmel paintings at the Hotel Del Monte Art Gallery in Monterey were said to “possess the charm of the subject . . . rendered with much feeling.”

In Los Angeles, Rose taught and served as Director of the Stickney Memorial Art School in Pasadena.

In 1921, Rose suffered a debilitating stroke that left him paralyzed. He died in Pasadena, California, on November 17, 1925. In 1926, the Stendahl Gallery held a memorial exhibition of his works.

As of 2026, Crocker Art Museum holds the largest Guy Rose museum collection in the world. A retrospective titled "Guy Rose: Impressionist" opens in May 2027 featuring 85+ paintings at the Crocker Art Museum.

== Image gallery ==
Selected works

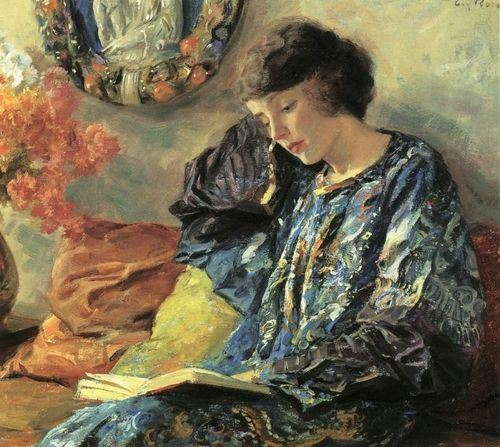
Marguerite, ca. 1900

Portrait of an algerian, ca.1900

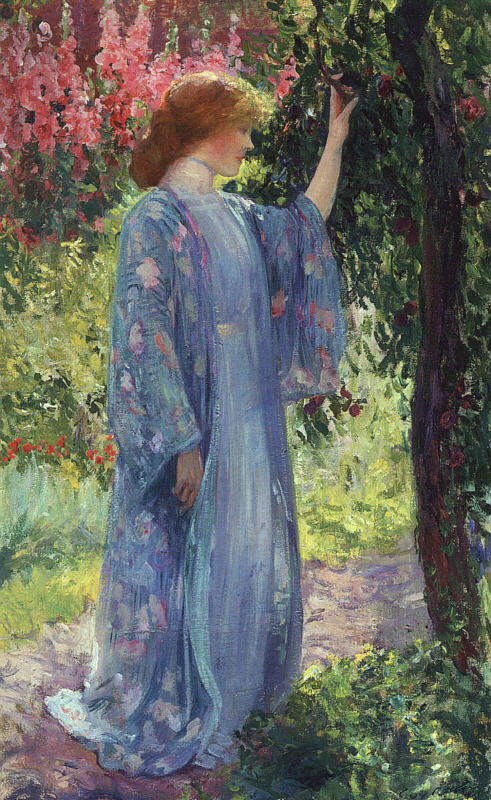
The Blue Kimono, 1909

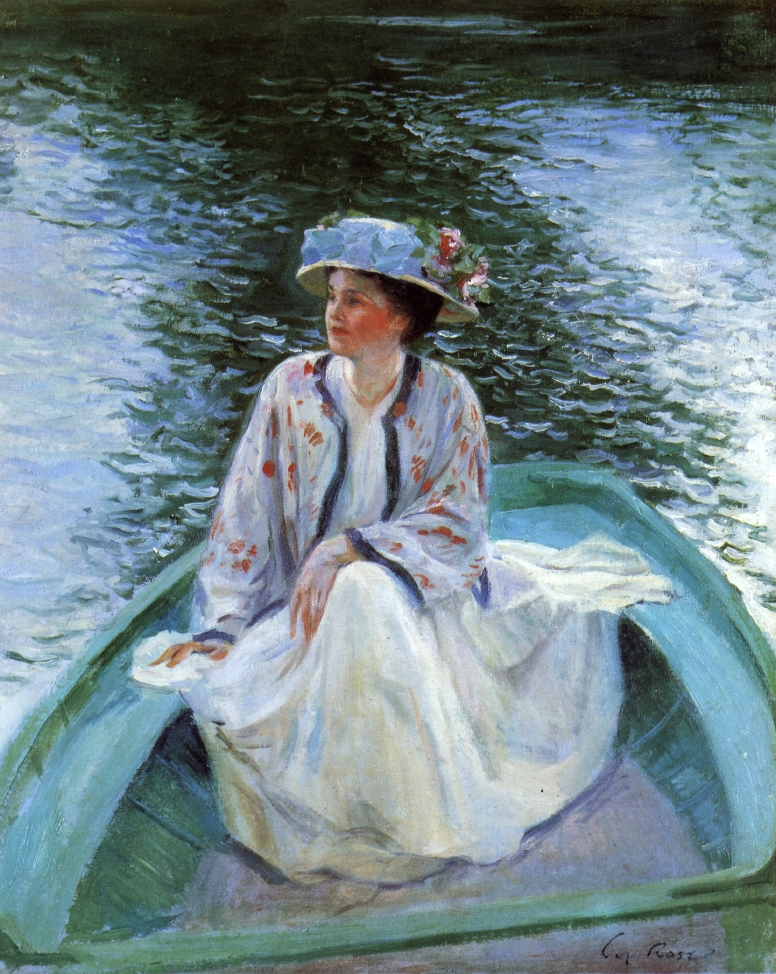
On the River, ca. 1910

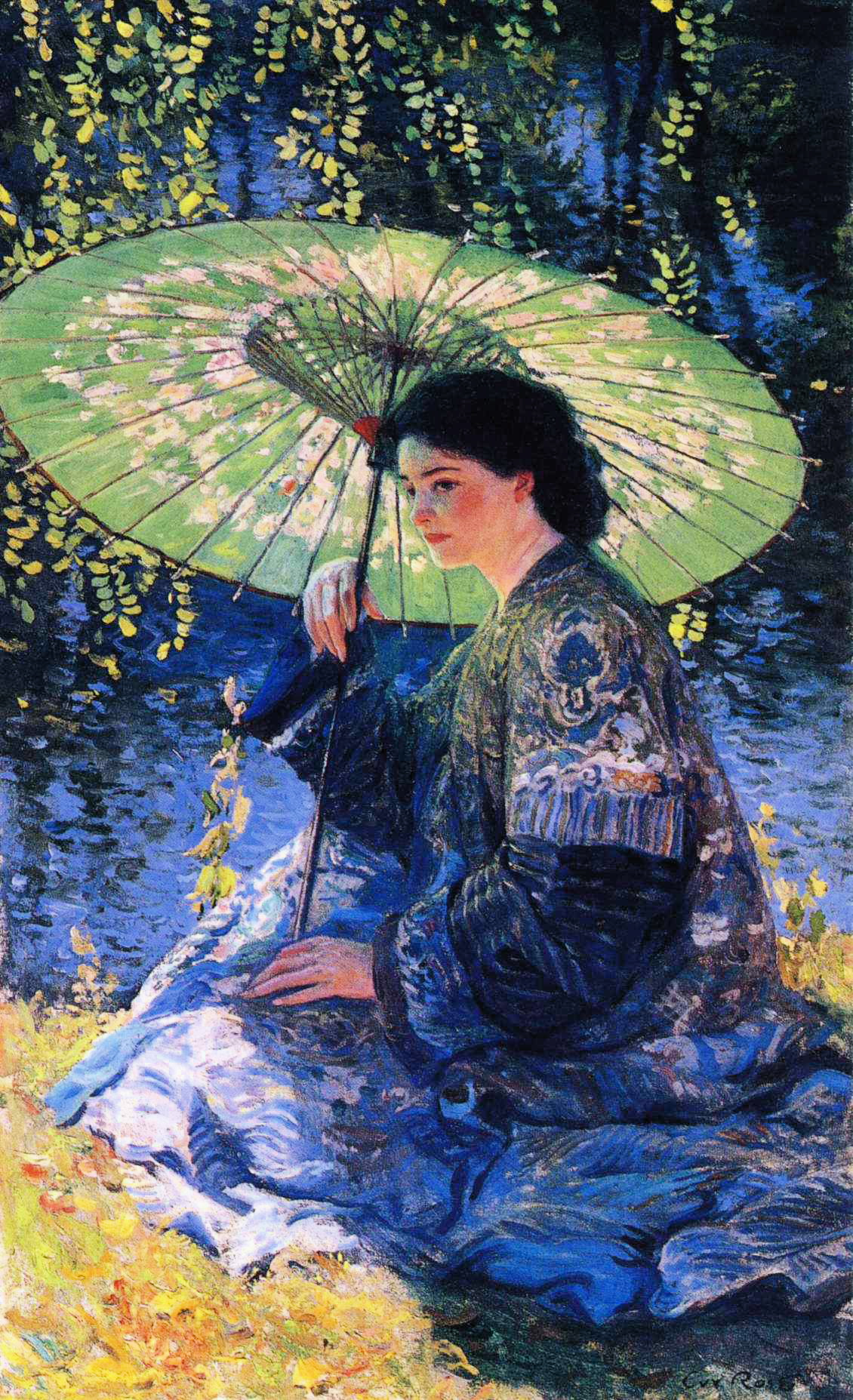
The Green Parasol, 1911

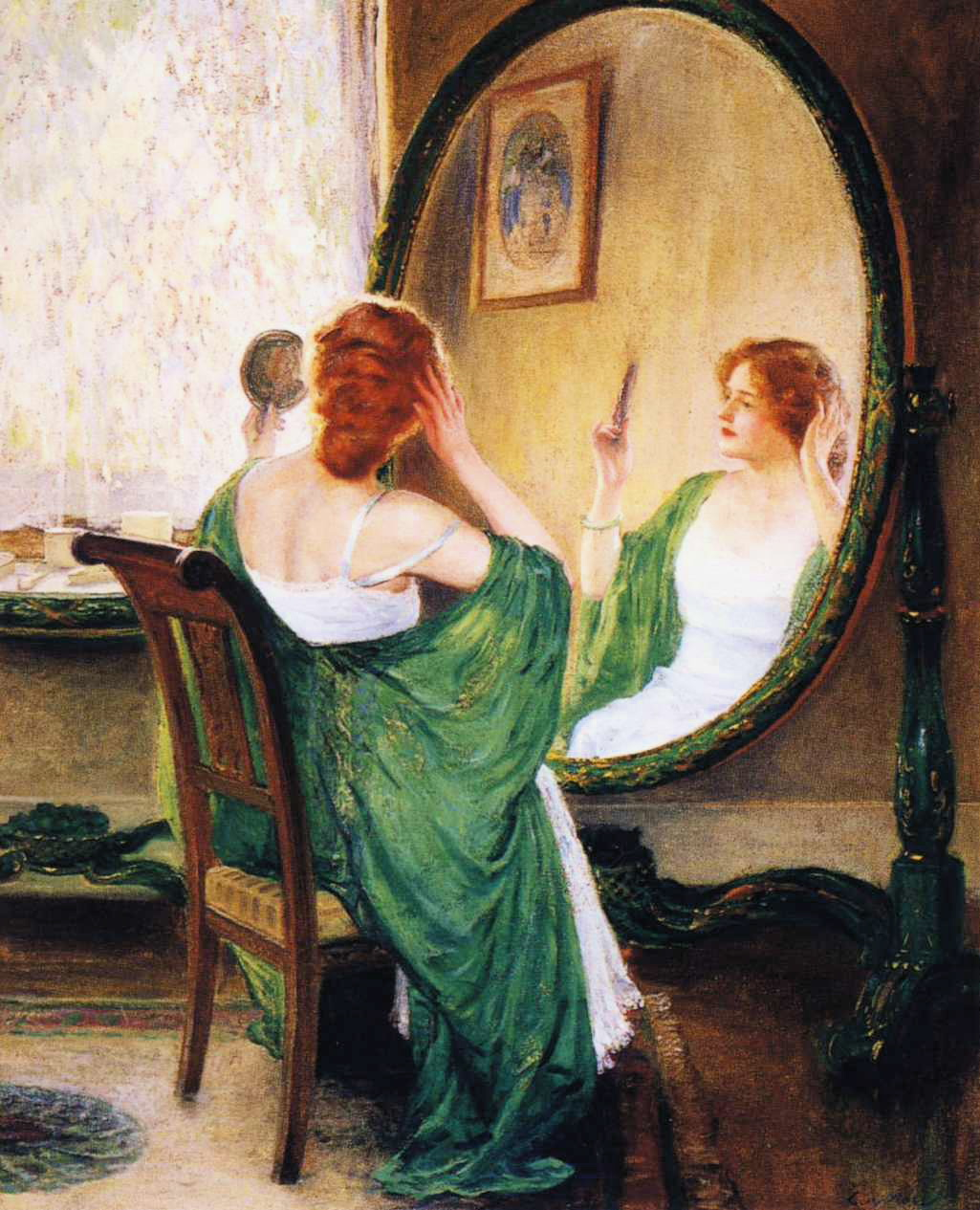
The Green Mirror, 1911

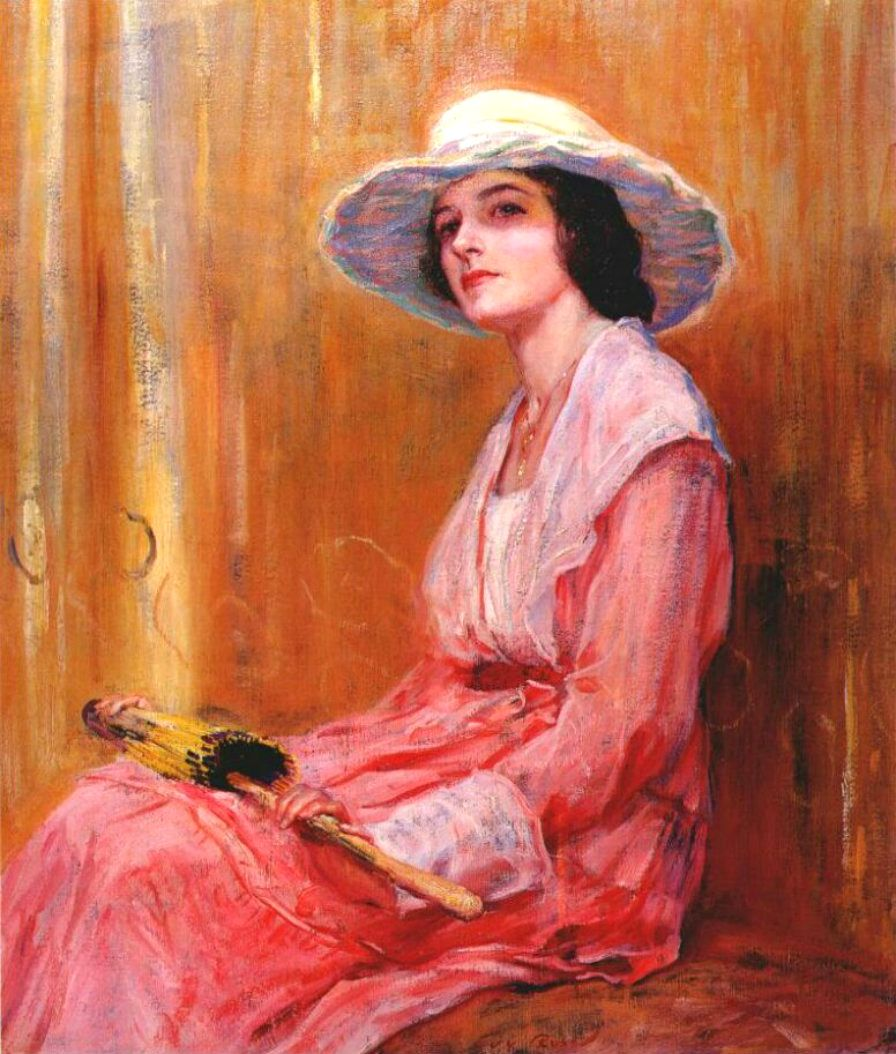
The Model, 1919

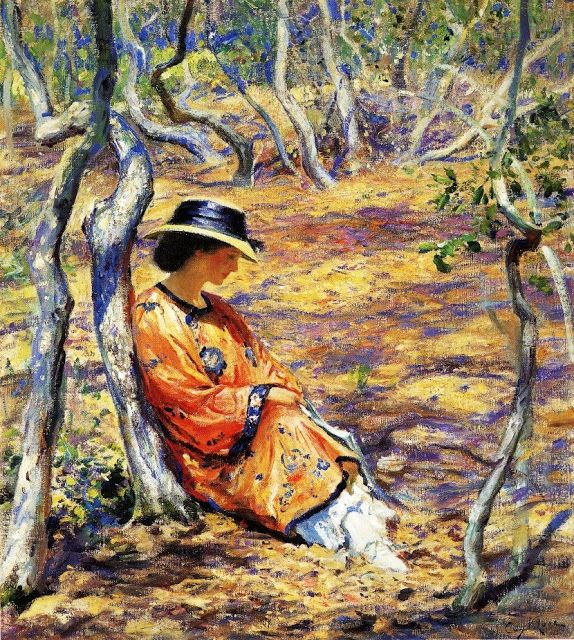
In the oak grove, 1919

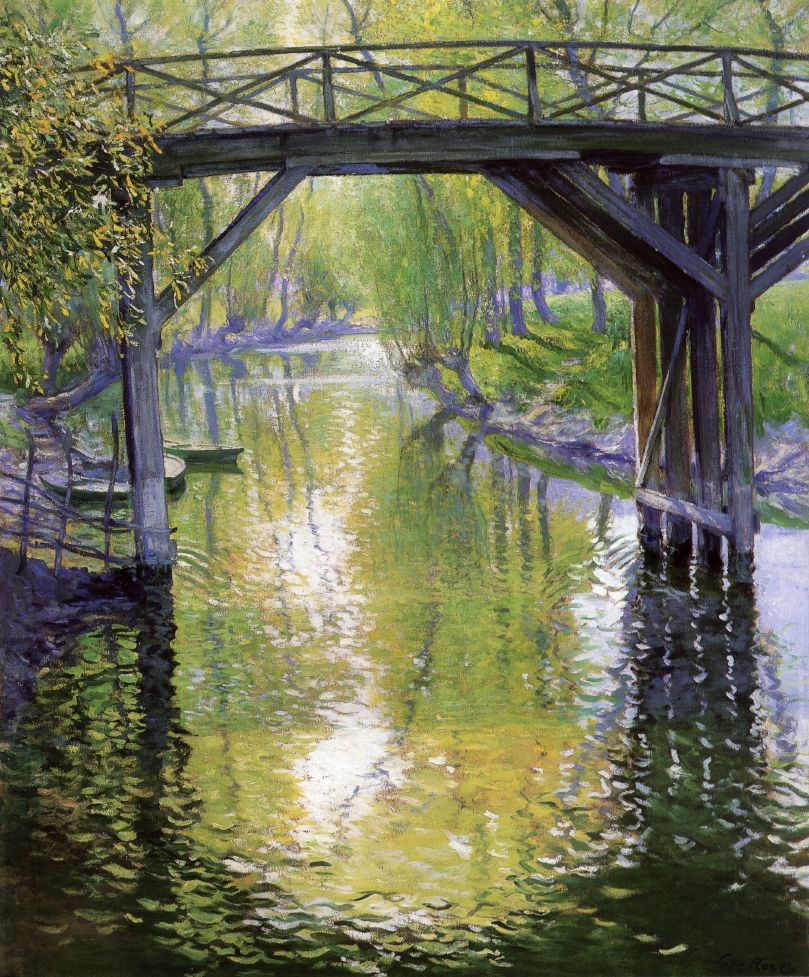
The Old Bridge, France, 1910

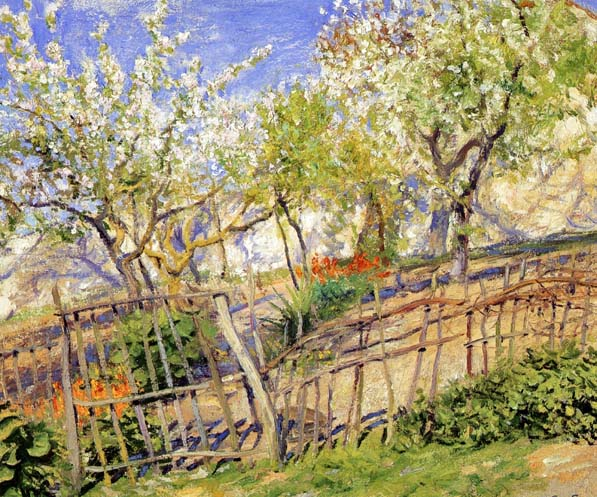
Blossoms and Wallflowers, ca. 1910

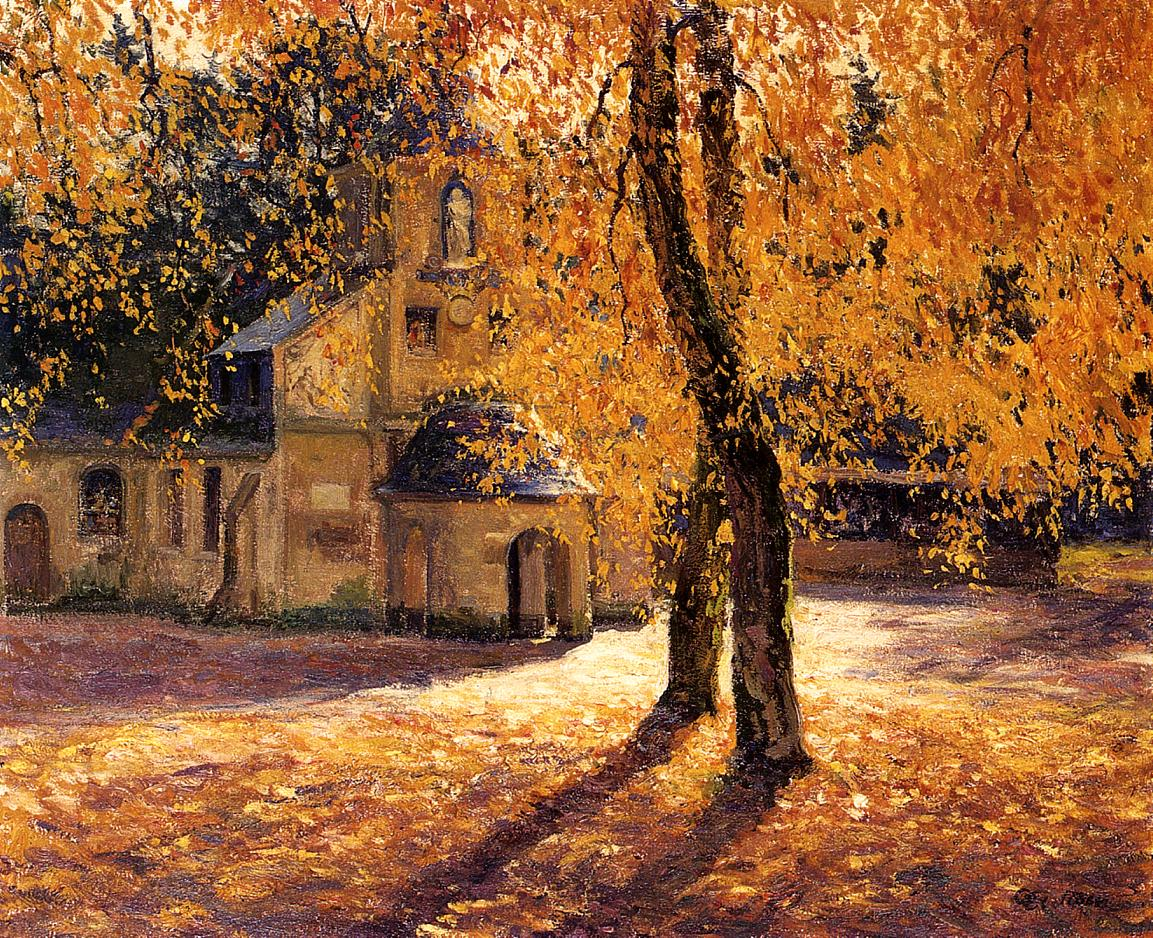
Notre Dame de Grâce at Honfleur, ca. 1910

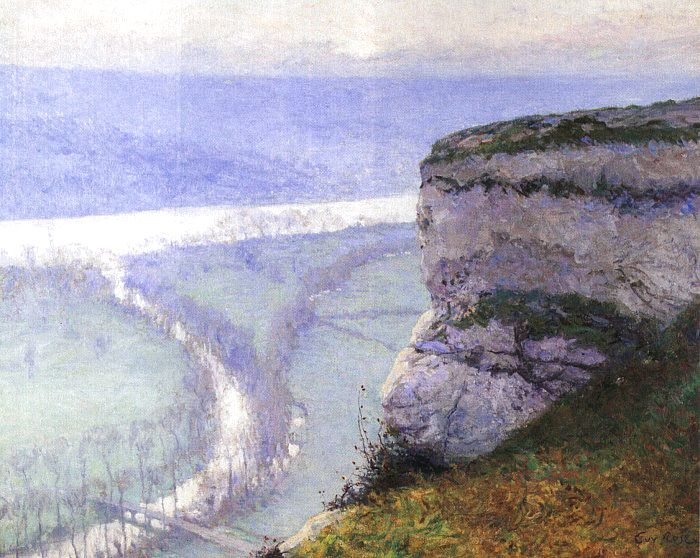
La Grosse Pierre, Giverny, 1910

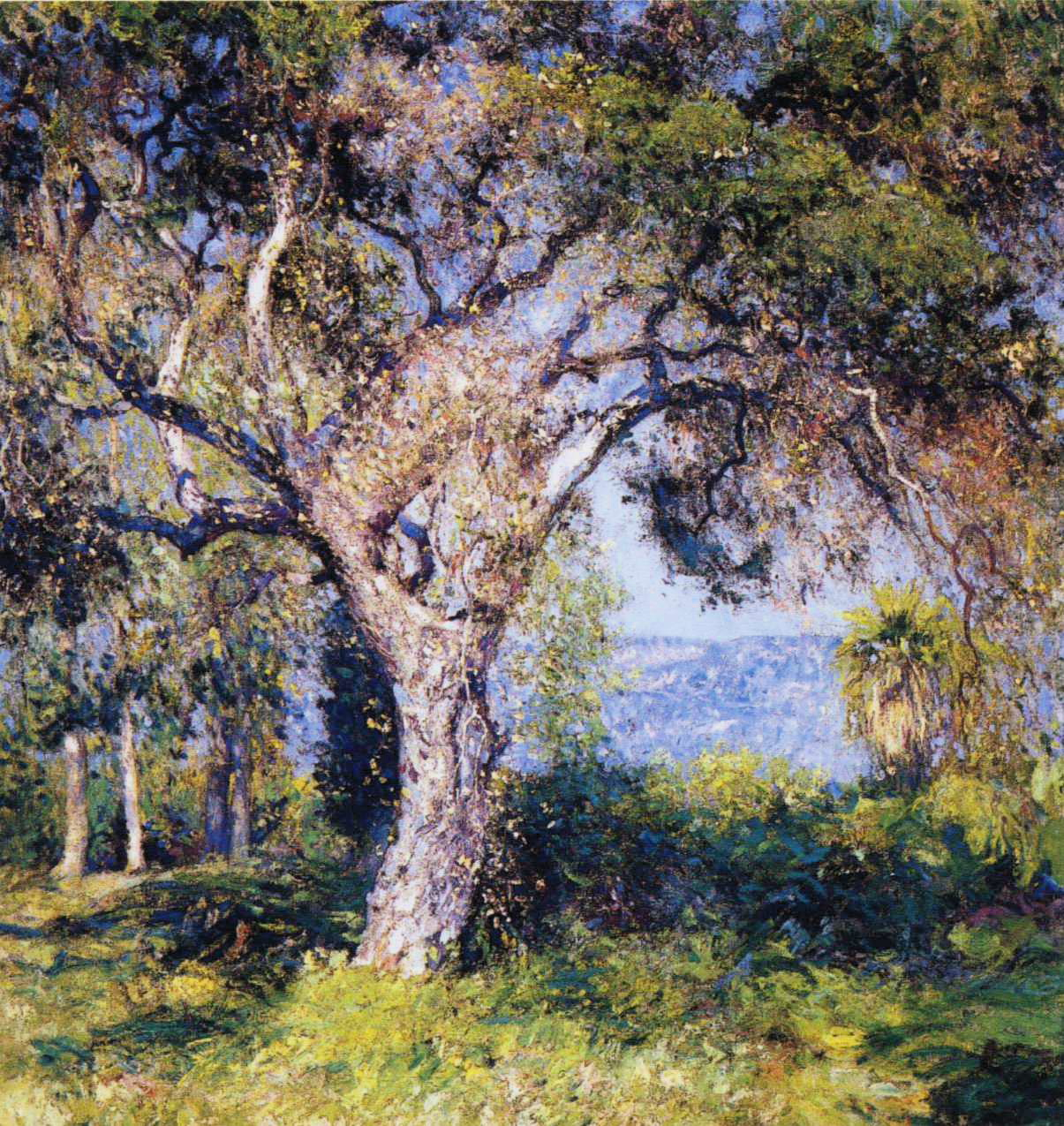
The Oak, 1916

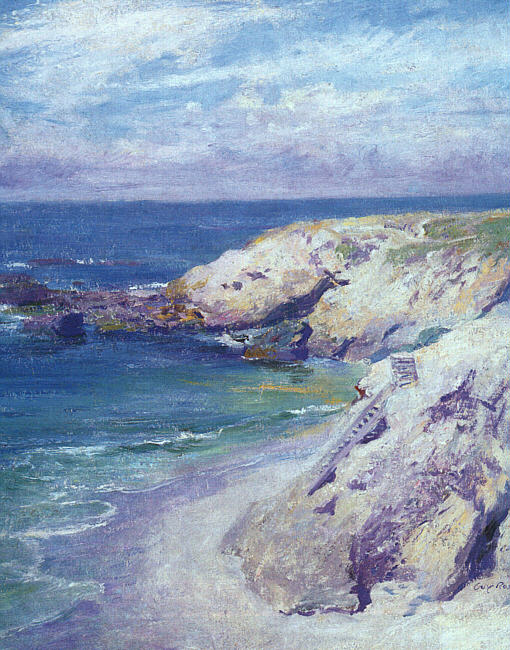
La Jolla Cove

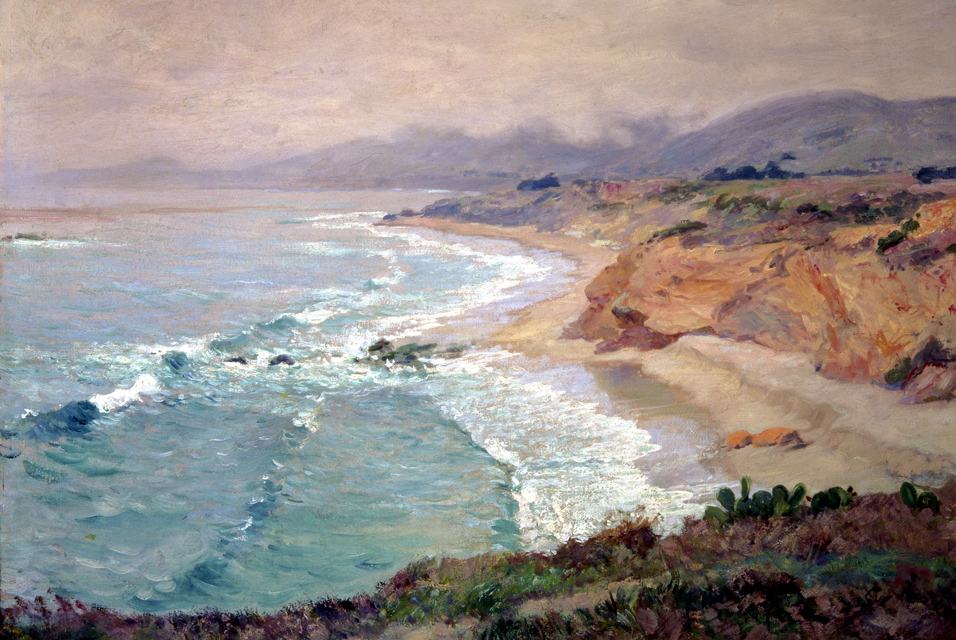
Lifting Fog, Irvine Museum

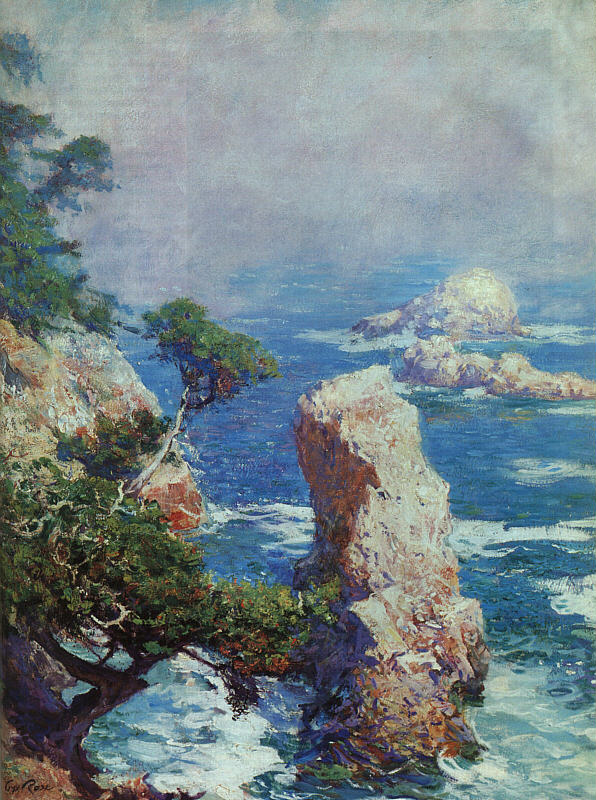
Mist over Point Lobos, 1918, Fleischer Museum

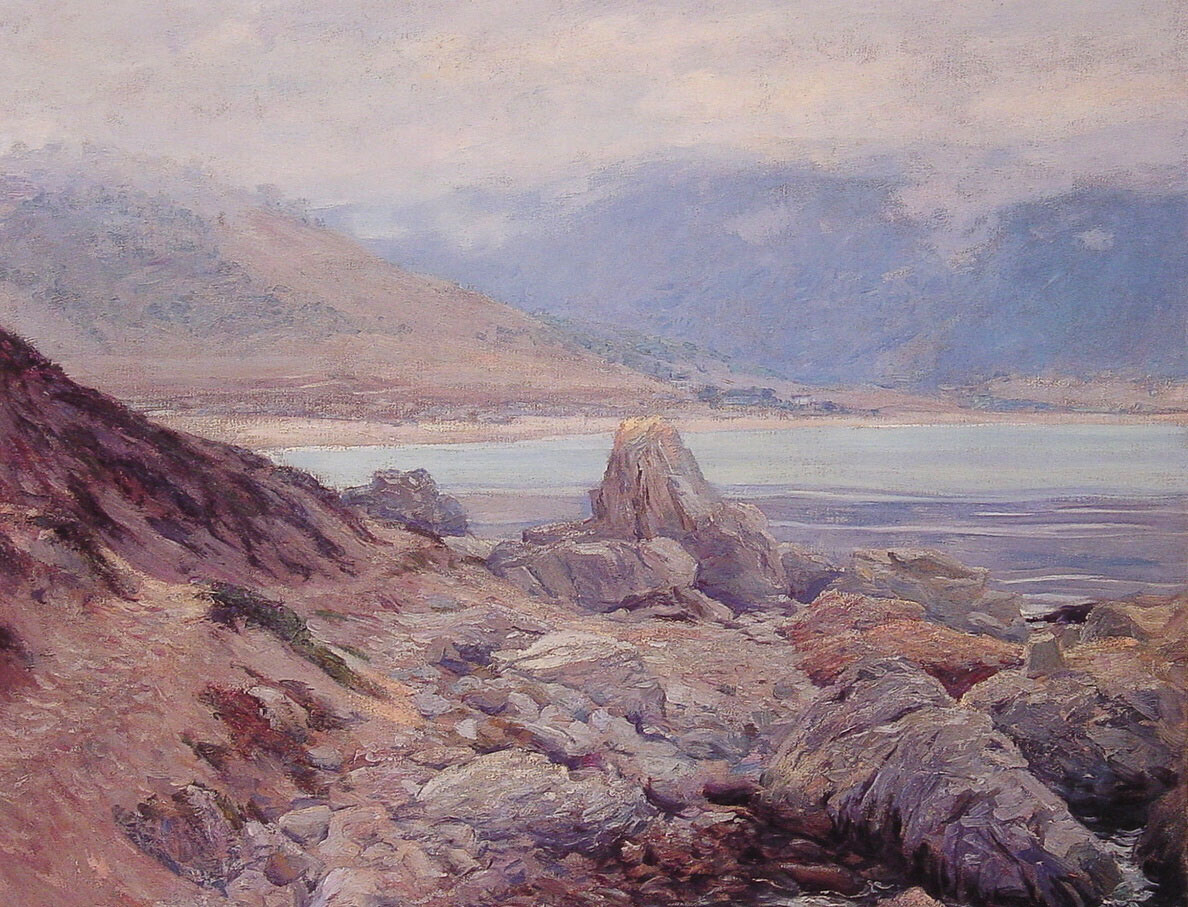
Path along the Shore, private collection
