= Sarah E. Bender De Wolfe =

American painter

Sarah E. Bender de Wolfe
- Born: July 10, 1852; Washington, D.C., U.S.
- Died: June 15, 1935 (aged 70); San Francisco, California, U.S.
- Known for: Painting
- Spouse: Harold DeWolfe (m. 1904)

Sarah E. Bender de Wolfe (1852−1935) was an American painter known for her still life paintings.

== Biography ==
de Wolfe née Bender was born on July 10, 1852, in Washington, D.C. She attended the California School of Design (now the San Francisco Art Institute) where she was taught by the American landscape painter Virgil Williams (1830-1886).

de Wolfe exhibited her work at the Woman's Building and the California State Building at the 1893 World's Columbian Exposition in Chicago, Illinois. de Wolfe also exhibited at the San Francisco Mechanics' Institute, the California State Fair, the California Midwinter International Exposition of 1894, and the San Francisco Guild of Arts & Crafts. She was a member of the San Francisco Art Association and the Association of San Francisco Women Artists.

Many of de Wolfe's early paintings were destroyed in the 1906 San Francisco earthquake.

She died on June 15, 1935, in San Francisco. Her work is in the collection of the Oakland Museum of California.

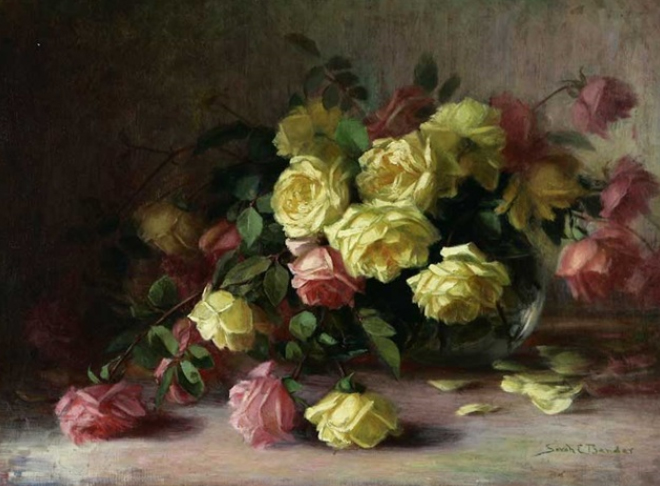
Pink and yellow roses in glass vase by Sarah E. Bender de Wolfe
