= San Francisco Women Artists =

One of California's oldest arts organizations

- Formation: 1887; 139 years ago
- Formerly called: Sketch Club, Society of San Francisco Women Artists

San Francisco Women Artists (SFWA) is one of California's oldest arts organizations. Created in 1887 as the Sketch Club, the organization was created by local San Francisco Bay Area women to support and promote the talents of established and emerging Bay Area women artists. Located in San Francisco's Sunset District, SFWA is a nonprofit organization that welcomes all genders, while specifically serving women artists.

SFWA began in 1887 as the Sketch Club. In 1915, it merged with the San Francisco Art Association. In 1925, it reformed, as the Society of San Francisco Women Artists. In 1946, it renamed as San Francisco Women Artists. In 1983, SFWA gallery opened at 451 Hayes Street then moved to 370 Hayes Street. In 2025 it operates a non-profit art gallery in the Sunset District.

== History ==
=== Background ===
On Tuesday, December 15, 1885, The School of Design's opening reception of the first exhibition of women's paintings was hosted in its Pine Street rooms.

=== Sketch Club ===
Initially known as the Sketch Club, SFWA was organized by independent women who met to share and critique each other's work and to counter the all-male Bohemian Club. The Sketch Club met monthly and also went on field trips. In 1887, the group's activities included lectures, semi-annual exhibits, weekly sketching trips to the East Bay, summer trips to Aptos, and trips to Pacific Grove. The group also established a university art scholarship in 1887. In 1894, 28 members exhibited their artwork in the California Midwinter International Exposition of 1894, held in the California Pavilion.

=== Society of San Francisco Women Artists ===
The organization was active until its San Francisco headquarters was destroyed during the 1906 earthquake. After the earthquake, the group began to exhibit men's work regularly, and in 1915 it merged with the San Francisco Art Association to create a coed organization. This merger did not last long, and by 1925, the women of the Society had branched off and formed the Society of San Francisco Women Artists (SSFWA). SSFWA held its first solo exhibit in 1926, and its meetings were held at the San Francisco Museum of Modern Art, which was at that time located on Van Ness Avenue.

In 1931, the SSFWA sponsored the first decorative native arts exhibit at the De Young Museum. During the same year, the SSFWA held its 6th Annual exhibition at the Legion of Honor which included Frida Kahlo's double portrait "Frida and Diego Rivera". This exhibit marked the first public showing of Kahlo's work. In 1939, SSFWA contributed to the 1939 Golden Gate International Exposition with murals, artists, and landscape architects. During World War II, the SSFWA partnered with the Red Cross to help rehabilitate servicemen in local hospitals.

=== San Francisco Women Artists (1946 – present) ===
By 1946, the SSFWA changed its name to San Francisco Women Artists and began a 30+ year relationship with Marchelle Labaudt (future Executive Secretary) and her Gough Street location of the Lucien Labaudt Art Gallery. In 1976, the SFWA and Labaudt were commended by the Senate for their "outstanding contributions to the cultural enhancement of the City of San Francisco."

In 1983, the SFWA procured a gallery that provided exhibition space for members. After moving galleries multiple times in the 1980s and 90s, the organization held two landmark exhibitions, "Hands and Heart, the Art of Healing" in 1997 and "To Life" in 1998, which received praise from First Lady Hillary Clinton.

In 2009, the Zimmerli Art Museum at Rutger's University included the SFWA in a historical survey on organizations promoting women and women artists. In 2014, the design firm Studio Hinrichs designed the new SFWA logo pro bono while the organization was going through a rebranding. In July 2015, SFWA moved to the Inner Sunset area of San Francisco.

Most recently, in 2016, SFWA was awarded the Neighborhood Arts Collaborative grant from the SF Grants to the Arts. The organization runs a student intern program in conjunction with the Mayor's Youth Education & Employment Program (MYEEP) and the Mercy High School "Women in Arts" Program as well as different educational presentations and discussions that are open to the public. These talks include the "artist-in-action" demonstrations, where SFWA artists teach the community different techniques and skills.

== Notable former members ==
Members have included the artists Amy D. Flemming, M. Evelyn McCormick, Helen Hyde, Dorr Bothwell, Claire Falkenstein, Ruth Asawa, Vera Allison, Imogen Cunningham, Emmy Lou Packard, Matilda Lotz, Clara Taggart MacChesney, Mona Beaumont, Billie Levy, Elizabeth Quandt, Beth van Hoesen, Louise McGinley, Leah Schwartz, Stefanie Steinberg, Jean Murray, Mercedes Smith, Sophie Van Bourg, Michelle Wyler, and Ruth Bernhard.

== Funding ==
San Francisco Women Artists is funded by its member artists, gallery activities and programs, individual donations, and grants. SFWA has received the San Francisco Arts Commission: SF Grants for the Arts, Neighborhood Arts Collaborative, and the Voluntary Arts Contribution Fund. It is currently a nonprofit 501(c)(3) organization.
