= Amy D. Flemming =

American painter

Amy D. Flemming (September 10, 1876 – December 17, 1970) was a painter and professor of art, active in the San Francisco Bay Area from the early 1900s to the 1960s. She was born Amy Dewing in San Francisco, taking the name Flemming when she married Herbert Flemming, c. 1919.

Flemming studied at the School of Design of the San Francisco Art Association. Her teachers included Arthur Mathews, Gottardo Piazzoni, and Hans Hofmann. Flemming herself was teaching art by 1916, and was a professor of art at San Francisco State Teachers College in 1938.

In the 1920s and 1930s, Flemming was active in the San Francisco Society of Women Artists, taking part in exhibitions and serving as an officer.

Flemming exhibited paintings, watercolors, pastels, and drawings in numerous venues including the San Francisco Art Association (from 1903 to at least 1948), the Marin County Art Association (first prize in painting, 1927), the California Art Club, Los Angeles, 1929, from 1946 in shows at the California Palace of the Legion of Honor, and from 1956 to 1957 at the Ruth White Gallery, New York.

Two high points of her career were the exhibition Amy D. Flemming: Paintings at the San Francisco Museum of Art (now the San Francisco Museum of Modern Art) in 1940, and at the same institution the show Oils by Amy D. Flemming in 1942.

In 1956, reviewing her show at the Ruth White Gallery in New York, ARTnews wrote that her oil paintings "use olive, deep black and somber red to denote emotions felt at witnessing the natural scene. They have a rather grandiloquent, Wagnerian quality."

Flemming's painting Flowers, Birds, Children in the Field (1963) is in the collection of SFMOMA. Her painting The Echo (by 1962) is in the collection of the San Francisco Art Institute.

Flemming died in Woodacre, California on December 17, 1970, at the age of 94.

== References and sources ==
=== Archives ===
- "Flemming, Amy, 1956-1957", Box 4, Folder 21, Ruth White Gallery records, 1933-1974, Archives of American Art, Smithsonian Institution.

=== Anonymous ===
- American Art Annual, vol. XXII, New York: The American Federation of Arts, 1925, p. 136.
- "The Calendar" in The Argus, vol. 4, no. 4, January, 1929, p. 19.
- A Catalog of the Art Bank, San Francisco Art Institute, 1962, pp. 39-40.
- "Exhibit of the Marin County Art Association" in The Argus, vol. 1, no. 3, June, 1927, p. 8.
- Finding Aid to the San Francisco Museum of Modern Art Exhibition Records, 1934-ongoing, SFMOMA Library & Archives.
- First Spring Annual Exhibition, California Palace of the Legion of Honor, 1946, p. 16.
- "San Francisco Women" in The Art Digest, November 1, 1937, p. 15.
- "September Exhibitions" in The Museum News, vol. XVIII, no. 5, September 1, 1940, p. 6.
- SFMOMA Exhibition List, 1935-1991, pp. 32 and 44.
- Untitled notice in The Argus, vol. 1, no. 6, September, 1927, p. 3, column 3.
- "Very Sorry, But...!" in Opera, Concert and Symphony, vol. 13, 1948, p. 27.
- Who's Who in American Art, R. R. Bowker, 1936–41.

=== By author ===
- H.C. "Amy Flemming (Ruth White)", gallery listing and capsule review signed with initials, ARTnews, vol. 55, no. 7, November 1956, p. 58.
- Hughes, Edan. Artists in California, 1786-1940, San Francisco: Hughes Pub. Co., 1989.
- Lehre, Florence Wieben. "The Oakland Annual" in The Argus, vol. 2, no. 6, March, 1928, p. 10.
- Salinger, Jehanne Bietry. "In San Francisco Galleries" in The Argus, vol. 3, no. 2, May, 1928, pp. 144–145.
- Walter, John I. "The San Francisco Art Association" in Art in California: a survey of American art with special reference to Californian painting, sculpture and architecture past and present, particularly as those arts were represented at the Panama-Pacific International Exposition, San Francisco: Bernier, R.L., 1916, pp. 97–101.
