= Mona Beaumont =

French-born American painter and printmaker

- Born: Mona Magdeleine Marx; January 1, 1927; Paris, France
- Died: August 29, 2007 (aged 80); San Diego, California, U.S.
- Education: University of California, Berkeley, Harvard University
- Occupation: Artist
- Known for: Painting, printmaking
- Movement: Cubism
- Spouse: William Gerald Beaumont
- Children: 2

Mona Magdeleine Beaumont (née Mona Magdeleine Marx; 1 January 1927 – 29 August 2007) was a French-born American painter and printmaker. She is known for abstract and in a cubist-style work, with subject matter in non-objective figure and still life. Beaumont lived in Lafayette, California, and the San Francisco Bay Area for many years, and was an important figure in painting there in the 1960s.

== Biography ==
Mona Beaumont was born January 1, 1927, in Paris, France. Her birthday has also been documented as 1 January 1932. She attended University of California, Berkeley where she received both Bachelor's and Master's degrees and continued her master's studies at Fogg Art Museum and Harvard University (M.A. degree). Additionally, she studied under modern artist Hans Hofmann at the Hans Hofmann Studio in New York City.

In 1946, she married William Gerald Beaumont, and together had two sons.

She received multiple awards including the Grey Foundation Purchase Award (1963), a prize at the Jack London Square Art Festival (1965), San Francisco Arts Festival Purchase Award and One–Person Exhibition Award (1966, 1975), and the Ackerman Award from San Francisco Women Artists Annual (1968).

=== Death and legacy ===
She died on 29 August 2007 in San Diego, California. Her work is part of the collections at the Fine Arts Museums of San Francisco, and the San Francisco Arts Commission. the Bulart Foundation in San Francisco; Grey Foundation in Washington, D.C.; Hoover Foundation in Palo Alto, California; and the Oakland Art Museum of California. Some of Beaumont's work was sold on online auction websites after her death.

== Exhibitions ==
=== Solo exhibitions ===
- 1960 – Mona Beaumont, solo exhibition, Galeria Protea, Mexico City, Mexico
- 1967 – Mona Beaumont, solo exhibition, Pomeroy Galleries, 449 Pacific Avenue, San Francisco, California; this exhibition travelled to Russia the same year.

=== Group exhibitions ===
- 1945 – group exhibition, Museum of Modern Art, New York City, New York
- 1964 – The Square Drawing, group exhibition, San Francisco Art Institute, San Francisco, California
- 1965 – group exhibition, 11th Annual Jack London Square Art Festival, Oakland, California
- 1970 – Annual San Francisco Women Artists exhibition, group exhibition, San Francisco Museum of Art, San Francisco, California
- 1975 – group exhibition, San Francisco Arts Festival, San Francisco, California
- 1977 – group exhibition, 31st Annual San Francisco Arts Festival, San Francisco, California
- 1977 – The 1975 exhibition award winners from San Francisco Arts Festival, group exhibition curated by Hayward Ellis King, Palo Alto Art Center, Palo Alto, California
