= The Cider Press =

Sculpture by Thomas Shields Clarke in San Francisco, California, U.S.

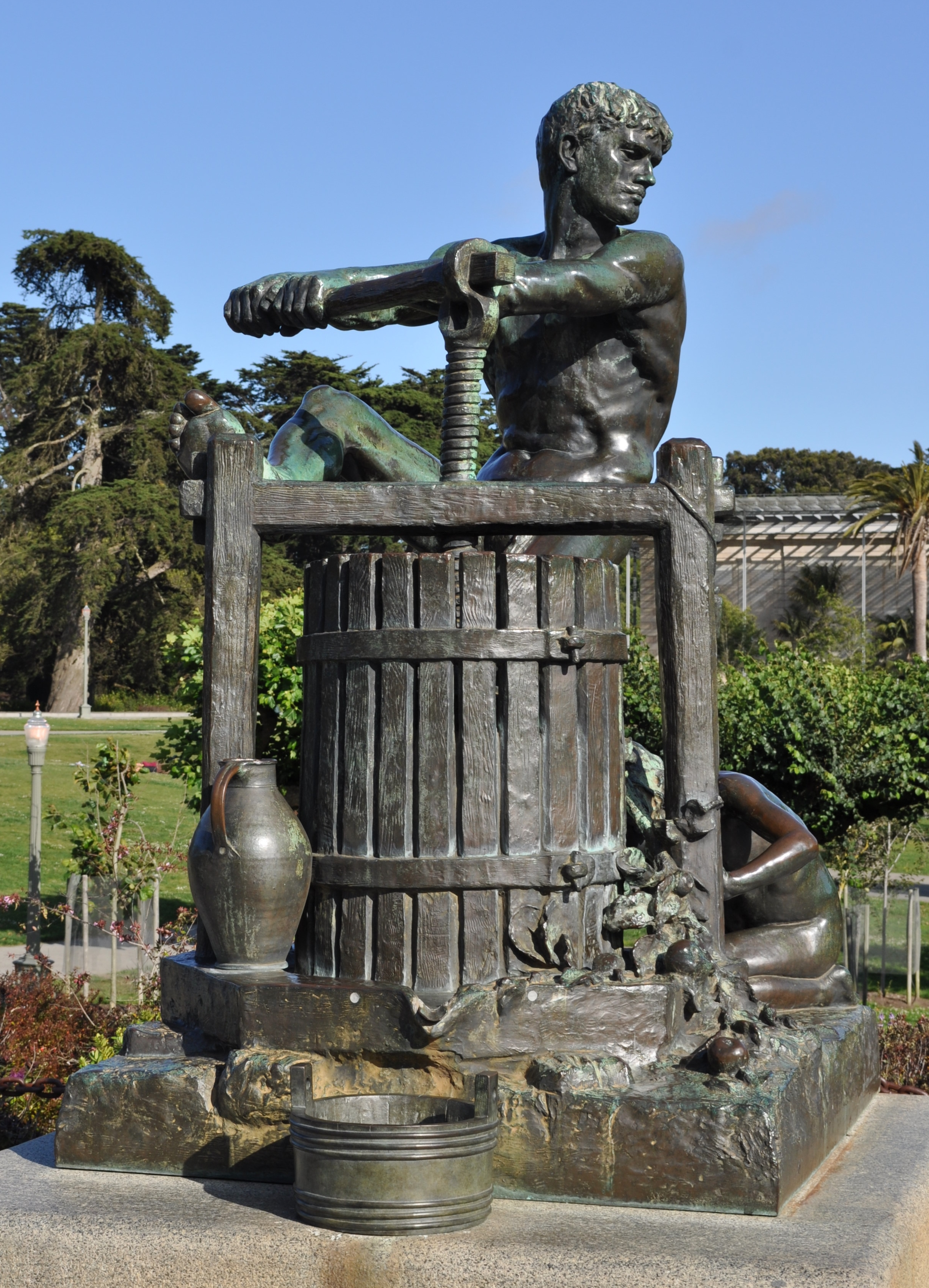
- The monument in 2010
- Location: San Francisco, California, U.S.
- 37°46′17.1″N 122°28′2.4″W

The Cider Press is a sculpture by Thomas Shields Clarke, installed in San Francisco's Golden Gate Park, in the U.S. state of California.
