= Thomas Shields Clarke =

American painter and sculptor (1860–1920)

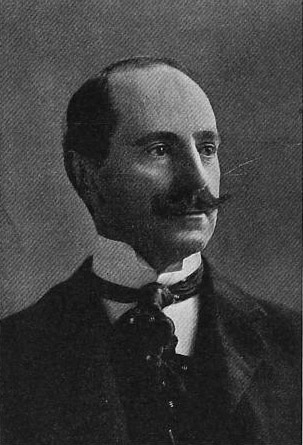
Thomas Shields Clarke, circa 1900

Thomas Shields Clarke (April 25, 1860 – November 15, 1920) was an American painter and sculptor. He is best known for his bronze sculpture The Cider Press, in San Francisco.

== Education ==
Named for his grandfather, he was born in Pittsburgh, Pennsylvania, the eldest of the six children of Charles John Clarke, a Pennsylvania Railroad executive, and Louisa Semple.

He was a cartoonist for a student newspaper at Princeton University, from which he graduated in 1882. He studied for a year at the Art Students League of New York, then worked as an illustrator in New York City. He moved to Paris to study at the Académie Julian—painting under William-Adolphe Bouguereau and Jules Joseph Lefebvre; and sculpture under Henri Chapu. He was admitted to the École des Beaux-Arts, where he studied in the atelier of Jean-Léon Gérôme. Clarke left the École after less than 3 years, and became the special pupil of Pascal Dagnan-Bouveret.

== Early works ==
Clarke exhibited his first painting at the Paris Salon of 1885, and had his first success with the wryly humorous A Fool's Fool, exhibited at the Salon of 1887. The Night Market in Morocco, an exotic scene by firelight, earned him a diploma of honor at the 1891 International Art Exhibition of Berlin, and was exhibited at the Paris Salon of 1892.

Clarke exhibited paintings at the 1893 World's Columbian Exposition in Chicago, Illinois—A Fool's Fool, The Night Market in Morocco, Portrait of Madame d' E, A Gondola Girl, and the full-size cartoon for a 3-part lunette stained glass window: Morning, Noon and Night. (Note: "He is now occupied in an interesting scheme for a stained glass window, all in tones of yellow, showing morning, noon and night. The first represents the Guardian Angel of Childhood, with a symbolical sunflower in the hand; the second, the Angel of Noonday, with spreading wings casting their shade over the child; and the third, the Angel of Night, holding the child in her arms, and a poppy. Around, the words symbolical of the twelve months.) He was awarded a medal for his paintings.

=== The Cider Press ===
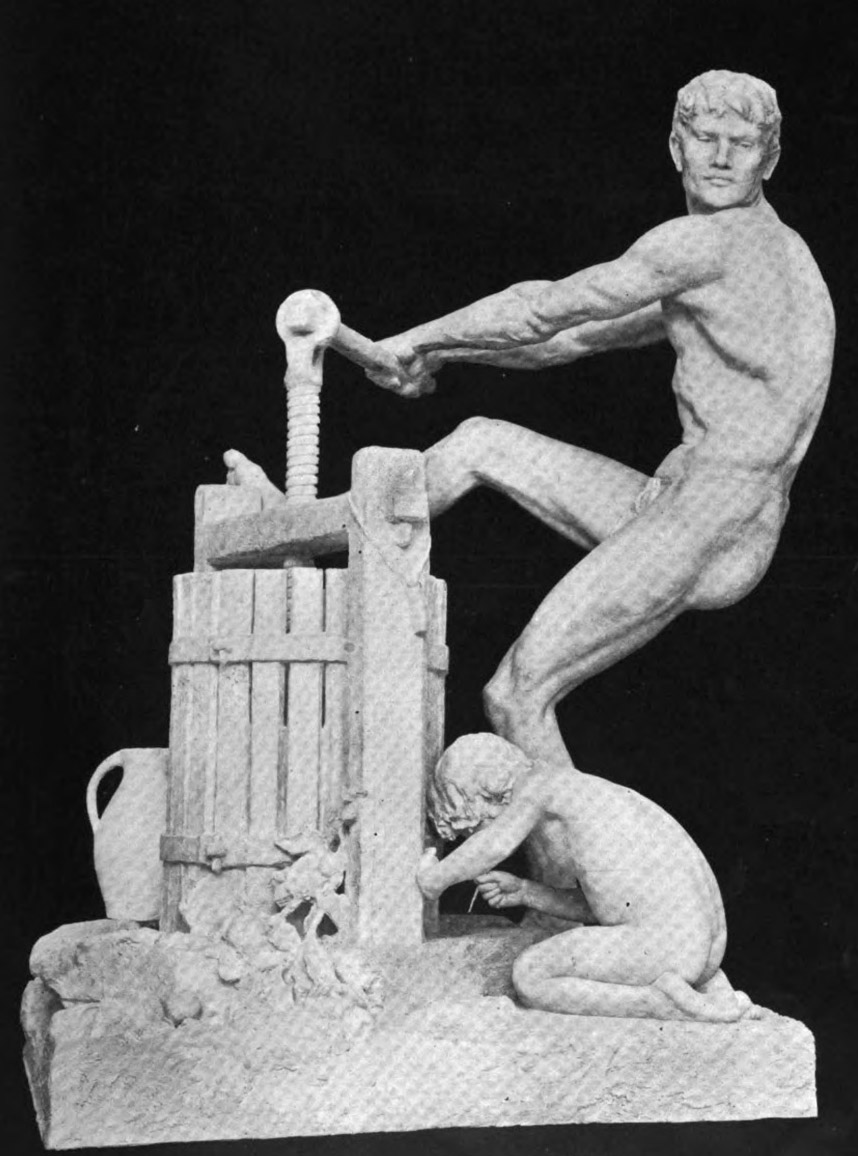
The Cider Press, plaster model in an 1892 photograph

Clarke debuted a plaster sculpture group, The Cider Press, at the Paris Salon of 1892. It depicts a muscular father pressing apples while his young son samples the juice. Clarke designed it to be a public drinking fountain, with water to flow out of the press and into a bucket at its base. (Note: "One of his earliest efforts was that serious but somewhat unwieldy and but slightly decorative concept for a fountain, 'The Cider Press," which was exhibited at the Columbian Exposition, and finally found a resting place in Golden Gate Park, San Francisco. This work showed a vigorous and well-constructed nude figure turning with much effort the screw of a cider press,—a somewhat tantalizing motive for a drinking fountain.") The Cider Press was exhibited at the 1892 Historical American Exposition in Madrid, at which King Alfonso presented Clarke with a medal (the only one awarded to a foreign sculptor). A larger-than-life-size bronze version was cast in Paris by Jaboeuf & Bezout Fondeurs, and exhibited at the 1893 World's Fair. The following year, it was exhibited at the California Midwinter International Exposition of 1894, in San Francisco. The Exposition's Executive Committee purchased the sculpture and presented it to the city. It was installed as a drinking fountain in Golden Gate Park in 1894. Vandalism caused it to be relocated to the grounds of the De Young Museum.

== Later works ==
Clarke modeled a set of four caryatides – Spring, Summer, Autumn, Winter – for the Madison Avenue façade of the Appellate Division Courthouse of New York State, in Manhattan. He modeled a figure in staff of Captain Thomas Macdonough for the Dewey Arch, a temporary structure erected in Madison Square, Manhattan, to celebrate Admiral George Dewey's 1898 victory in the Spanish–American War. Clarke modeled an ornate bell for the gunboat USS Princeton (active 1898–1919). He modeled To Alma Mater (1900), a larger-than-life-size plaster sculpture group for his own alma mater, Princeton University, but it seems never to have been executed in bronze or marble.

== Honors ==
Clarke was elected an associate of the National Academy of Design in 1902. George M. Reevs painted his "diploma" portrait. Clarke was a member of the National Sculpture Society, the National Arts Club, the Architectural League of New York and the Century Association.

== Personal ==
On October 3, 1886, Clarke married Adelaide Knox, the daughter of Theodore Hand Knox and Adelaide Susan Jenney, in Geneva, Switzerland. The couple had three children: daughters Alma Adelaide Clarke and Beatrice Clarke Remington, and son Charles John Clarke, named for his grandfather and known as "Jack."

Clarke lived in Europe for 11 years, and returned with his family to the United States in 1894. He hired architect Wilson Eyre to design an Arts & Crafts-style summer house and studio, "Fernbrook," in Lenox, Massachusetts. Completed in 1904, Clarke generally worked there from May to October.

Clarke's brothers, Louis, John and James, were pioneers in automobile production. Louis Semple Clarke patented the porcelain-insulated sparkplug.

== Legacy ==
The Pennsylvania Academy of the Fine Arts in Philadelphia owns "A Fool's Fool" (1887), and a collection of Clarke's sketches: PAFA also holds a collection of his correspondence and photographs:(PDF)

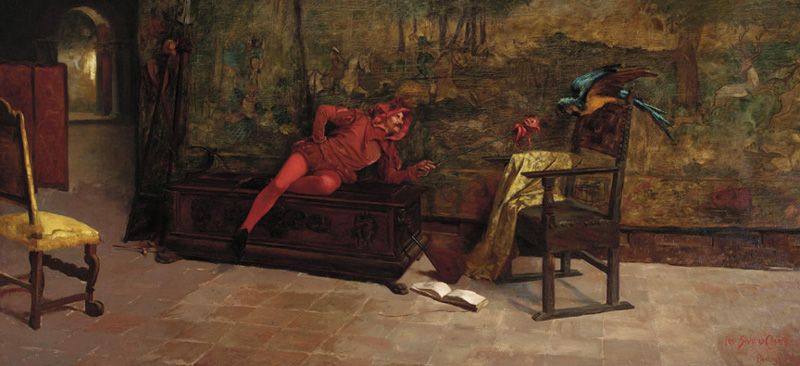
A Fool's Fool (1887), Pennsylvania Academy of the Fine Arts

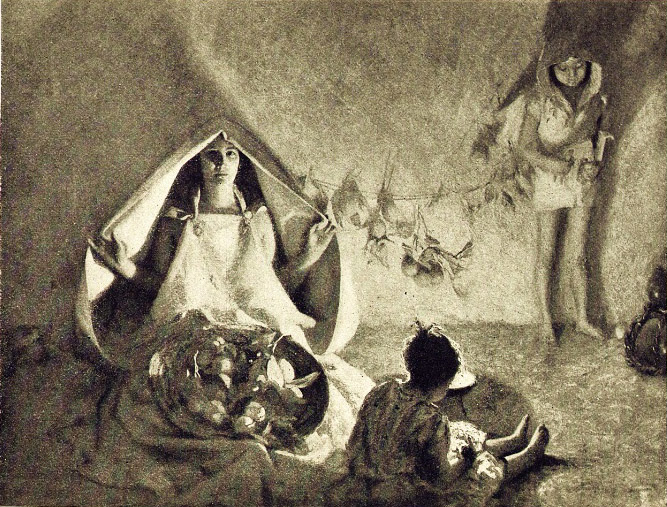
The Night Market in Morocco (c. 1891), unlocated

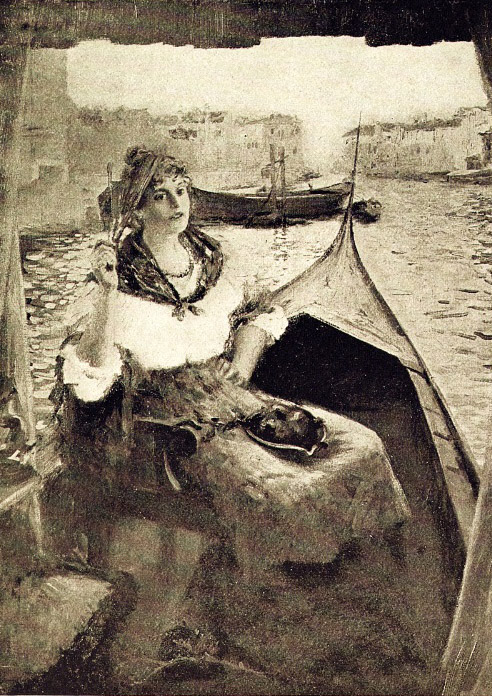
A Gondola Girl (1892), private collection

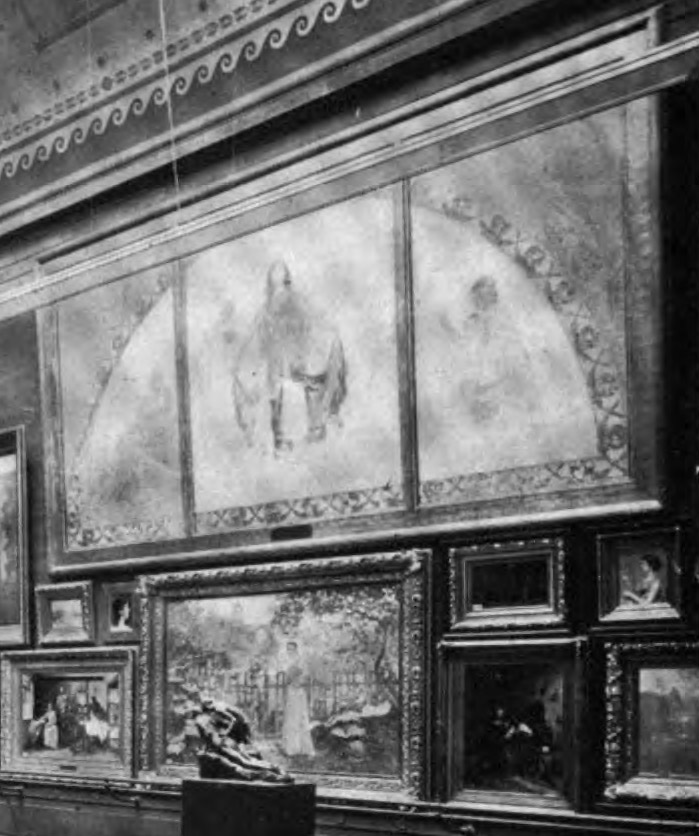
Morning, Noon and Night (c. 1892) cartoon for a stained glass window

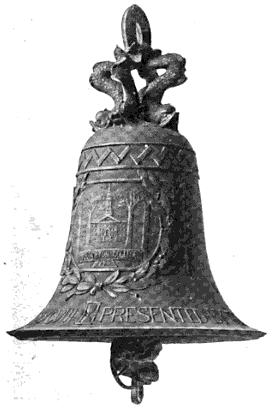
USS Princeton bell (1898)

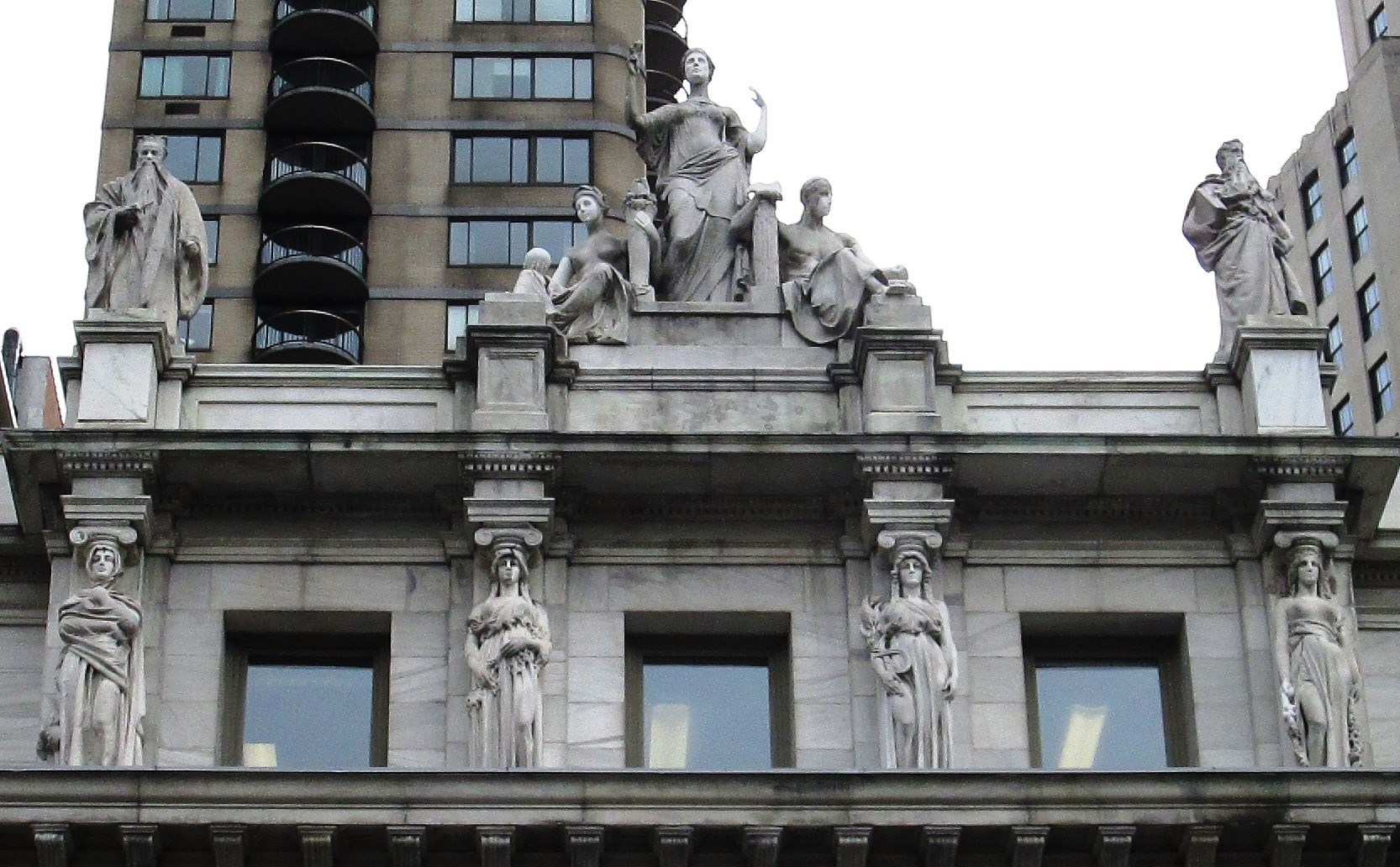
The Four Seasons caryatides (1899), Appellate Division Courthouse of New York

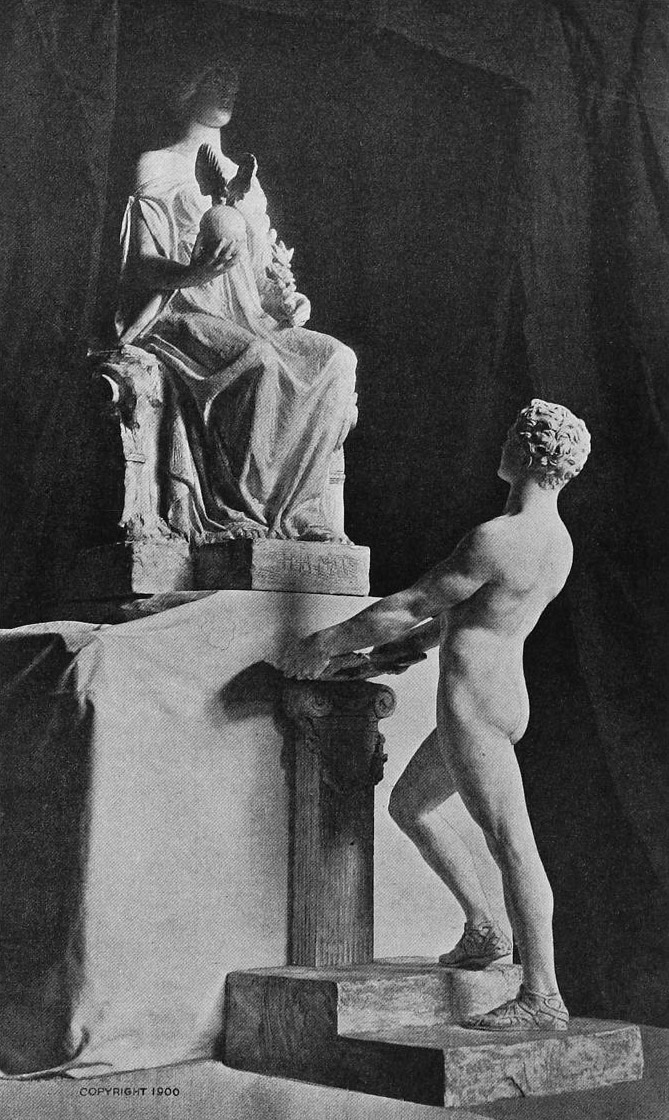
To Alma Mater (1900), plaster model

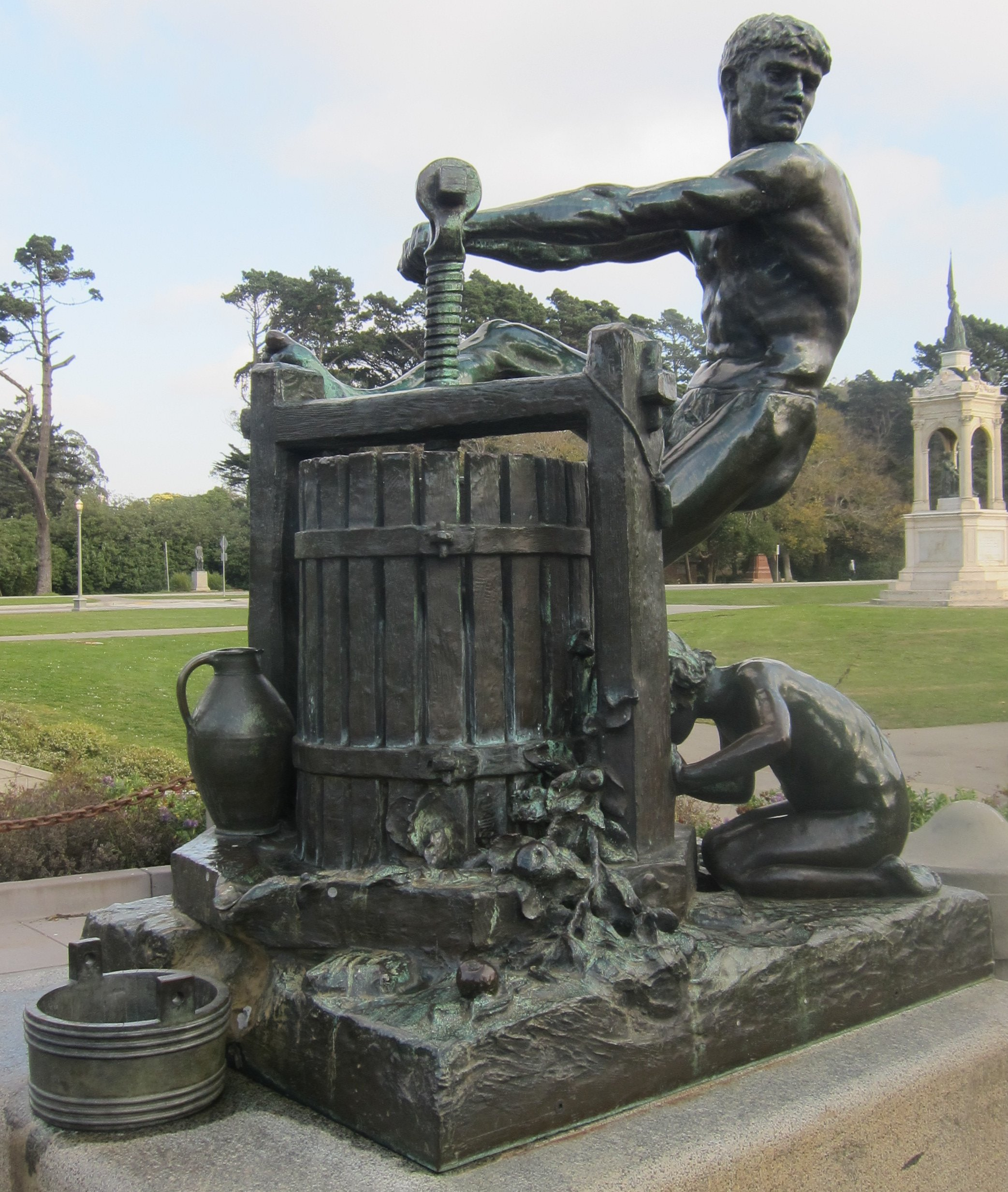
The Cider Press, outside the De Young Museum, San Francisco
