= Matilda Lotz =

American painter

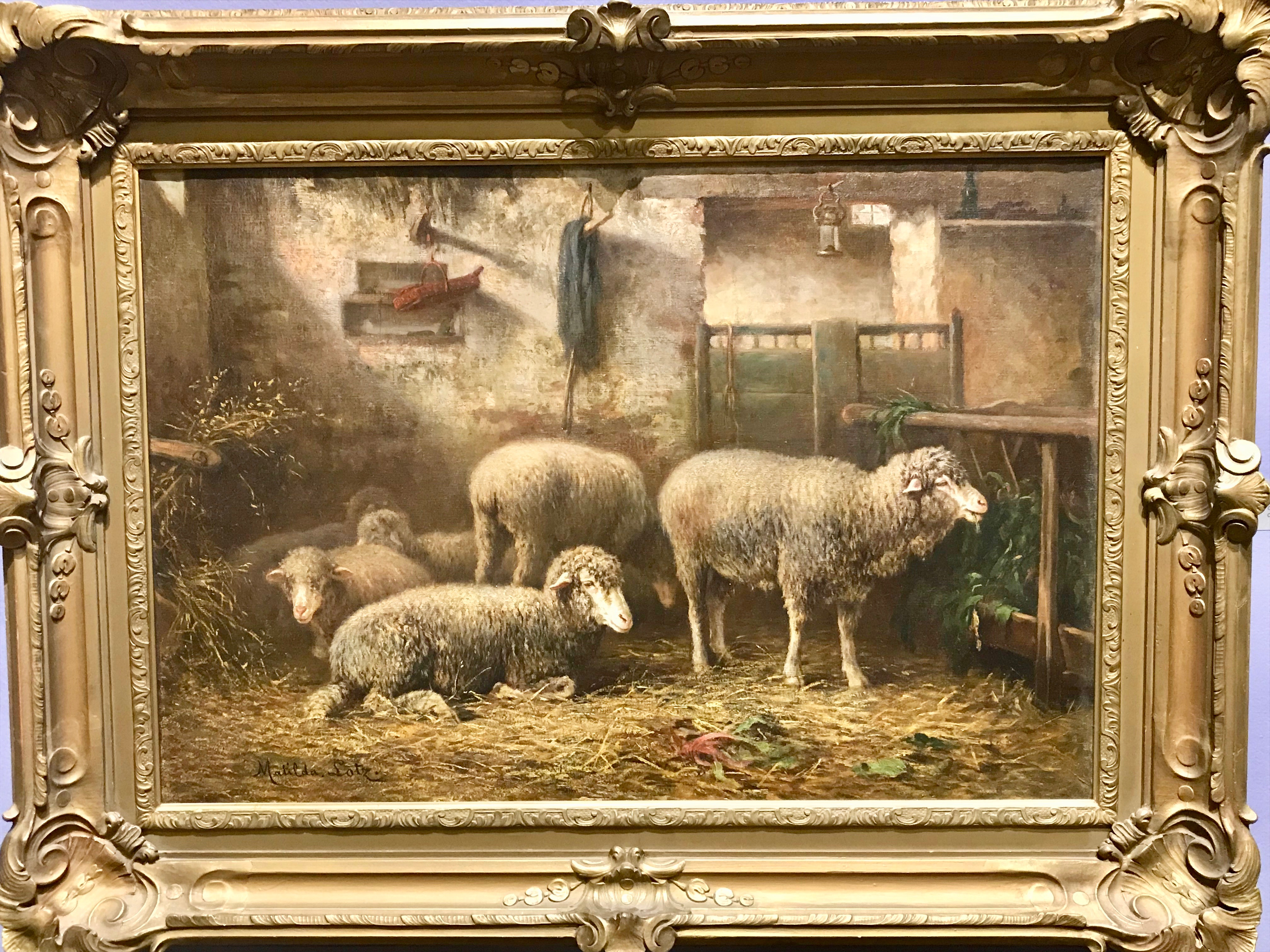
- Stable Interior with Sheep, circa 1900 by Lotz.
- Born: November 29, 1858; Franklin, Tennessee, U.S.
- Died: February 21, 1923 (aged 64); Tata, Tatai járás, Komárom-Esztergom, Hungary
- Education: San Francisco School of Design
- Spouse: Ferenc Blaskovits

Matilda Lotz (1858–1923) was an American painter. She was one of California's premiere female artists, as well as a prominent animal portraitist. Lotz was born and raised in the Lotz House, which became the site of an American Civil War Battle, and is now on the National Register of Historic Places.

== Early life ==
Matilda Lotz was born in Franklin, Tennessee, on November 29, 1858, to German parents. Her father, Johann Albert Lotz, was a master carpenter who designed and built the family home, where they lived with her mother, Margaretha and her brothers, Paul and Augustus. The Lotz family home became the site of the Battle of Franklin; Lotz, who was only six years old at the time, and her family were forced to hide in their neighbor's brick basement for hours as the battle raged on, as their wooden house would not have provided sufficient protection. When they emerged after seventeen hours, their property was filled with dead and wounded soldiers, and their house was turned into a hospital for several months. The Lotz family home has been turned into a Historic site and has begun collecting examples of Lotz's work.

Lotz began an interest in art early in life, as a child she would draw farm and household animals in the dirt. When given the chance, she used coal from the fireplace and small scraps of paper to practice drawing. Reportedly, she also once tried drawing on a wall, but was disciplined for doing so.

== Education ==
The Lotz family left Franklin, and briefly migrated to Memphis, Tennessee before moving to San Jose, California. Lotz began her art career in the 1860s; her first painting lessons came from her brother Paul. In 1874, Lotz attended the San Francisco School of Design (now San Francisco Art Institute) on a six-year course with Virgil Macey Williams, where she won several medals and received the highest honors. She continued her education in Paris in the 1880s with Felix-Joseph Barrias, and later Emile van Marcke. It was while in Paris that Lotz received two gold medals from the Paris Academy, the first woman to receive such an honour, and an honorable mention from the Paris Salon.

== Later career ==
Lotz travelled throughout Europe and North Africa, uncommon for a single, un-chaperoned woman, and her journeys influenced her work. She also painted portraits while visiting her family in California, including that of William Randolf Hearst and Leland Stanford. Lotz returned to Paris in the 1890s where she worked closely for several years with French artist Rosa Bonheur. During this time she was also invited to London by the Duke of Portland, where she was commissioned by British nobility for animal paintings, as well as to Tata, Hungary for animal portraiture. Lotz was living in Algiers at the outbreak of World War I, but was forced to leave by the French and returned to Tata in 1915, until her death on February 21, 1923. She married painter Ferenc Blaskovits later in her life.

== Exhibitions ==
- 1872, 1874: California State Fair
- 1875–1910: San Francisco Art Association, San Francisco, California
- 1878–1887: Mechanics' Institute, San Francisco, California
- 1882-86: Paris Salon
- 1888, 1900: Gump's, San Francisco, California
- 1894: California Midwinter International Expo., San Francisco, California
- 1909: Del Monte Art Gallery, Monterey, California
- 2018–2019: "Something Revealed: California Women Artists Emerge, 1860–1960", Pasadena Museum of History

== See also ==
- Elizabeth Norton
