= California Midwinter International Exposition of 1894 =

1894 World's Fair in San Francisco, California

1894 San Francisco
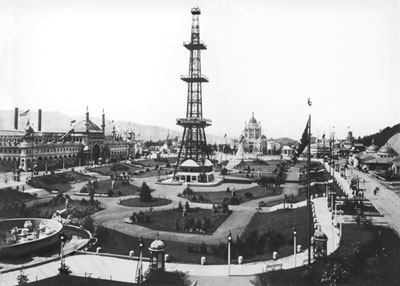
- The Main Concourse

Overview
- BIE-class: Universal exposition
- Name: California Midwinter International Exposition
- Area: 200 acres (81 hectares)
- Visitors: 2.5 million

Location
- Country: United States
- City: San Francisco
- Coordinates: 37.77064°N 122.46749°W

Timeline
- Opening: January 27, 1894
- Closure: July 4, 1894

The Exposition at night. Few of the surrounding areas were electrified, making the Fair a magical sight after dark.

The California Midwinter International Exposition of 1894, commonly referred to as the "Midwinter Exposition" or the "Midwinter Fair", was a World's Fair that officially operated from January 27 to July 5 in San Francisco's Golden Gate Park.

In 1892, U.S. President Benjamin Harrison appointed Michael H. de Young as a national commissioner to the 1893 World's Columbian Exposition held in Chicago. During the exposition in Chicago, de Young recognized an opportunity to stimulate California's economy in its time of depression. In the summer of 1893, de Young announced his plans for the California Midwinter International Exposition to be held in Golden Gate Park. One of the draws, according to de Young, was California's weather, which would allow for a fair in the middle of winter. Golden Gate Park Superintendent John McLaren fought against holding the exposition in the park claiming,"the damage to the natural setting would take decades to reverse."

In August 1893, the U.S. Congress approved for the fair to be held in Golden Gate Park. Prior to the Midwinter Fair's opening day, in 1893, Isaiah West Taber won the concession to be the official photographer of the fair. Taber documented the fair from when the grading of the land began, and continued photographing the fair throughout its entirety. He sold his photos in a striking, multi-story pavilion during the exposition, on the fair grounds. At the end of the fair, he compiled about 130 of his original photographs into a souvenir book entitled Souvenir of the California Midwinter International Exposition. Much of what is known about the fair, especially visually, comes from Taber's photographs.

The fair encompassed 200 acres centered on the park's current Music Concourse. 120 structures were constructed for the exposition, and more than 2 million people visited. The fair was to feature four major buildings. These buildings included the Fine Arts Building, the Agriculture and Horticulture Building, the Mechanical Arts Building, and the Manufacturers and Liberal Arts building. The Fine Arts building has become the M.H. de Young Memorial Museum (and has been rebuilt in a much different design).

Other major attractions include the park's famed Japanese Tea Garden, Bonet's Tower, the amusement attractions, and the many cultural exhibits. The Overland Monthly issue April 1894 covered the Architectural Effects, Education, the Wild and Woolly, Congresses, Breadwinners, Lighting, the Benefits, Agriculture and Horticulture, Art Displays, Minerals, and Russia at the Fair.

== Background ==
In 1893, M. H. de Young, a San Francisco local who attended the Chicago World Fair, realized that California could reap major benefits from hosting its own world fair. De Young envisioned a world fair in the middle of winter, where people from the frigid East coast and all over the world could enjoy the nice crisp weather of California, along with its bountiful opportunities. Furthermore, de Young sought to boost California's economy, which was faltering and weakening. During this time period, California and the rest of the country was struggling during one of the 19th century's worst depressions. De Young and other leaders believed that a world fair in San Francisco would create jobs and stimulate the local economy. However, their grander vision was to promote California as a land of endless opportunities, with good weather and arable lands.

Support for de Young's plan came immediately. De Young held a series of meetings in Chicago, and declared that he had raised $41,500 in just two weeks since announcing his intentions. In a short amount of time, 4,400 exhibitors committed to move from Chicago to San Francisco in support of the fair. Mayor Levi Richard Ellert of San Francisco and Governor Henry Markham of California both expressed support for the plan. The public also showed their support by donating various amounts. Mayor Ellert established a Finance Committee, which was charged with raising and maintaining the necessary funds. This committee's main strategy was to collect donations from the public. As a result, the fair was financed entirely by donations, and it did not receive any federal, state, or local bonds, loans, grants, or subsidies. In the end, the fair raised $344, 319.59. The fair then began and ended without any debt.

== Grand Court buildings ==
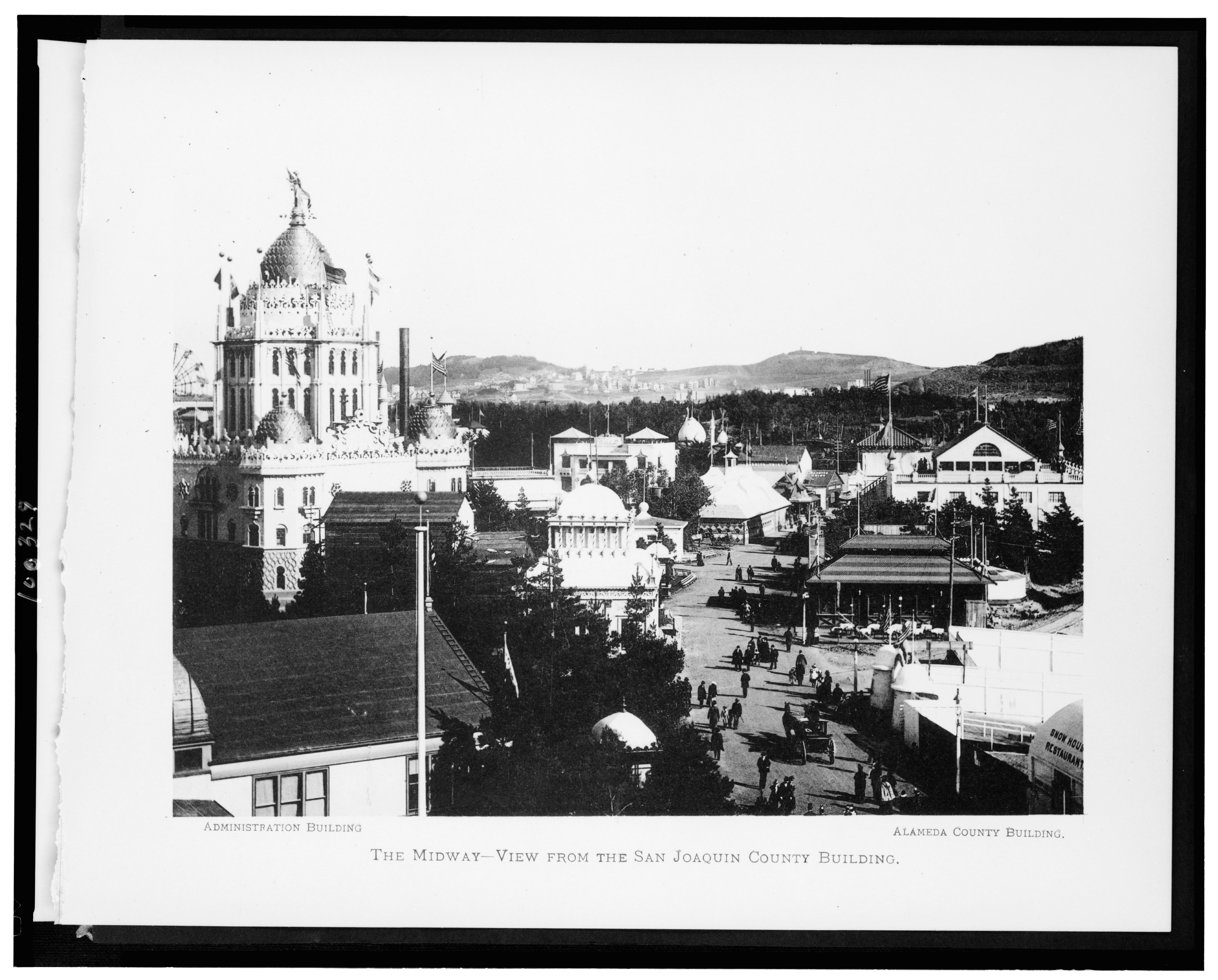
The Midway, with the Administration Building at left

=== Administration Building ===
The Administration Building was built at the western end of the Grand Court, where the current Spreckels Temple of Music is today. The main purpose of the building was for offices of the fairs department chiefs and other general administrators of the fair. The architecture of the Administration Building was decided by Arthur Page Brown. His design featured Arabic, Byzantine, Gothic and Islamic styles. It featured a 135-foot-tall dome with figures in relief. The building was three stories and was illuminated almost entirely by natural light. During the night, the building could be seen from miles away because it was lit up entirely by incandescent lamps.

=== Agriculture and Horticulture Building ===
The Agriculture and Horticulture Building was located just west of the Fine Arts building, and is part of where the DeYoung Museum stands today. It was designed by Samuel Newsom. It cost $58,000, and was designed in a California Mission style with Romanesque influence. It featured three domes to let in light for the plants. Inside, there were plants and flowers, California foliage, and statues. Fruit from the south, grain and livestock from the Sacramento and San Joaquin Valleys, and strawberries and artichokes from the Salinas Valley, as well as California's winter crops were featured.

=== Bonet Tower ===
The Bonet Tower was a large steel tower set in the center of the Grand Court of Honor that harnessed the recent discovery of electrical lighting, designed by French architect Leopold Bonet. Standing at 266-feet, the Bonet Tower was approximately a third the size of the Eiffel Tower, after which it was modeled. The tower was adorned with 3,200 multicolored lights. The top level of the tower housed a spotlight which was used to illuminate popular locations in the park, as well as the nearby Lone Mountain. The tower proved to be the largest source of income for the fair, as elevator rides to the top cost $0.25, and rides to the first level cost $0.10. Bonet's Tower remained standing for 2 years until John McLaren called for it to be destroyed with high-powered explosives.

=== Fine Arts Building ===
The Fine Arts Building, now the de Young Museum, was built in Golden Gate Park to hold the pieces of art that were commissioned for the Midwinter Exposition. The building was designed in a "pseudo–Egyptian Revival style and decoratively adorned with images of Hathor, the Egyptian cow goddess." The building itself was a brick structure built 50 feet high with a skylit roof supported by iron trusses. After the Midwinter Exposition ended, the Fine Arts Building was made into a free and public museum, having most of the art from the Expo donated by the artists. The Fine Arts Building lasted for 11 years before an earthquake in 1906 ruined the integrity of the original building, which led to a year and a half closure for repairs. In 1929, four years after de Young's death, the original Fine Arts building was finally torn down.

The Fine Arts Building featured the artwork of sixty-eight artists, twenty-eight of whom were female. Many of these female artists received their education at the California School of Design, which eventually became today's San Francisco Art Institute. At the time, the California School of Design accepted women as students, and hired females as instructors. Many of the women showcased at the Midwinter Fair came to San Francisco after showing in exhibits at the Columbian Exposition in Chicago. For example, Evelyn McCormick and Clara McChesney had work featured in both expositions. Some of the other female artists featured in the Fine Arts Building included Alice Brown Chittenden, Helen Hyde, Matilda Lotz, Dora Norton Williams, Eva Almond Withrow, and several more. The artwork produced by these women consisted of various oil paintings, many focusing on California. "At a time when camera film could make only black and white images, their colorful paintings of famous early California subjects are visual memories of important local history."

=== Manufactures and Liberal Arts Building ===
The Moorish-style Manufactures and Liberal Arts Building was located on the east end of the concourse, closest to the Panhandle. It was designed by Arthur Page Brown, and cost $113,000 to build. Divided into three sections, it featured manufactures, liberal arts, and ethnology/archaeology. The liberal arts division featured a display from University of California, Yale University, Cogswell Technical School, Mills College, and the California School for the Deaf and Dumb as well as the other private schools. There was also a display from the astronomical department of the Lick Observatory. The manufactures division featured many displays from the Columbian Exhibition in Chicago. The ethnology/archaeology division featured models, statues, inventions, and weapons from thirty-eight different locations on the globe. It was used as a store for commercial goods, with imports from across the globe. The building was the largest building in the fair, and considered the largest building in California at the time.

=== Mechanical Arts Building ===
The Mechanical Arts Building was designed by Edward Swain. It occupied "an acre space of (300' x 160')" right where the California Academy of Sciences stands today. The building both displayed and conducted the machinery needed to run the electricity throughout the park. It also displayed the "latest in mechanical engineering science". The center of the building held a gilded globe representing California's total reported yield of gold to date. In 1894, this gilded globe weighed over 2,000 tons and was worth "$1.3 billion, or over $32 billion converted to current values".

== Other buildings ==
=== Emergency Hospital ===
The emergency hospital of the Midwinter Exposition was established in connection with the police station at the heart of Golden Gate Park in an oval of land known as the Grand Court of Honor. The plot was located between the North and South drives of the park and consisted of five major buildings. One major structure was the Administration Building, next to which stood the emergency hospital. It attracted much attention at the fair due to its unusual cross-shaped structure and large red, painted crosses. The building was officially named Lengfeld's Pharmacy after Dr. A. L. Lengfeld who established the College of Pharmacy at the University of California. Lengfeld's Pharmacy in itself became an unintentional exhibit of modern, clean and efficient medicine at the Midwinter Exposition during a time that medical procedures were gaining significant societal interest.

The emergency hospital was equipped with a team of physicians and an ambulance service. Initially, Martin Regensberger, the resident physician of the medical facility, was unable to find a local ambulance for his use. De Young obtained an ambulance built for the Columbian Exposition in Chicago the year before and brought it to San Francisco. Following the exposition, the ambulance was purchased by Theresa Fair, the future owner of San Francisco's Fairmont Hotel. Theresa Fair donated the ambulance to the city and it gave rise to the first and oldest continuously operating municipal ambulance service in the United States.

Nearly 2000 cases were treated during the Fair, ranging from small cuts and burns to life-threatening injuries. There were a number of large accidents at the Fair that required the use of the emergency hospital. One of the most famous tales is of an overloaded stagecoach of dancers that overturned and injured thirteen people. There was a mistake in the hustle of the incident, and an onlooker accidentally pulled the fire alarm instead of contacting the hospital. The mishap was eventually sorted and the single ambulance of the emergency hospital then made thirteen trips between the hospital and the location of the accident in the ’49 Mining Camp.

=== Santa Barbara Amphibia ===
The Santa Barbara Amphibia was an exhibit encompassing 76' by 56' feet, which held many species of marine life that made the Santa Barbara channel their home. The interior contained a large tank in a L-shaped fashion that contained 40,000 gallons of sea water to emulate the natural environment of the animals. Behind the tank there were rookeries and grottos terraced like the Channel Islands; the sea lions, sea tigers, and sea-otters natural habitat . However, not all the marine animals were alive. Most notably on display was a pickled Basking shark adjacent to the tank of water. The Mayor of Santa Barbara, Edward W. Gaty, spent months carefully preparing what was to be a demonstration of Santa Barbara’s channel. Along with sea-lions, sea-otters, and leopard sharks, he also sent Mexican leather work, seashells, and an array of mosses. As a last-minute decision Mayor Gaty added the El Montecito Spanish band to play string music for the delectation of sightseers.

== Exhibits and rides ==
=== Boone's Wild Animal Show ===
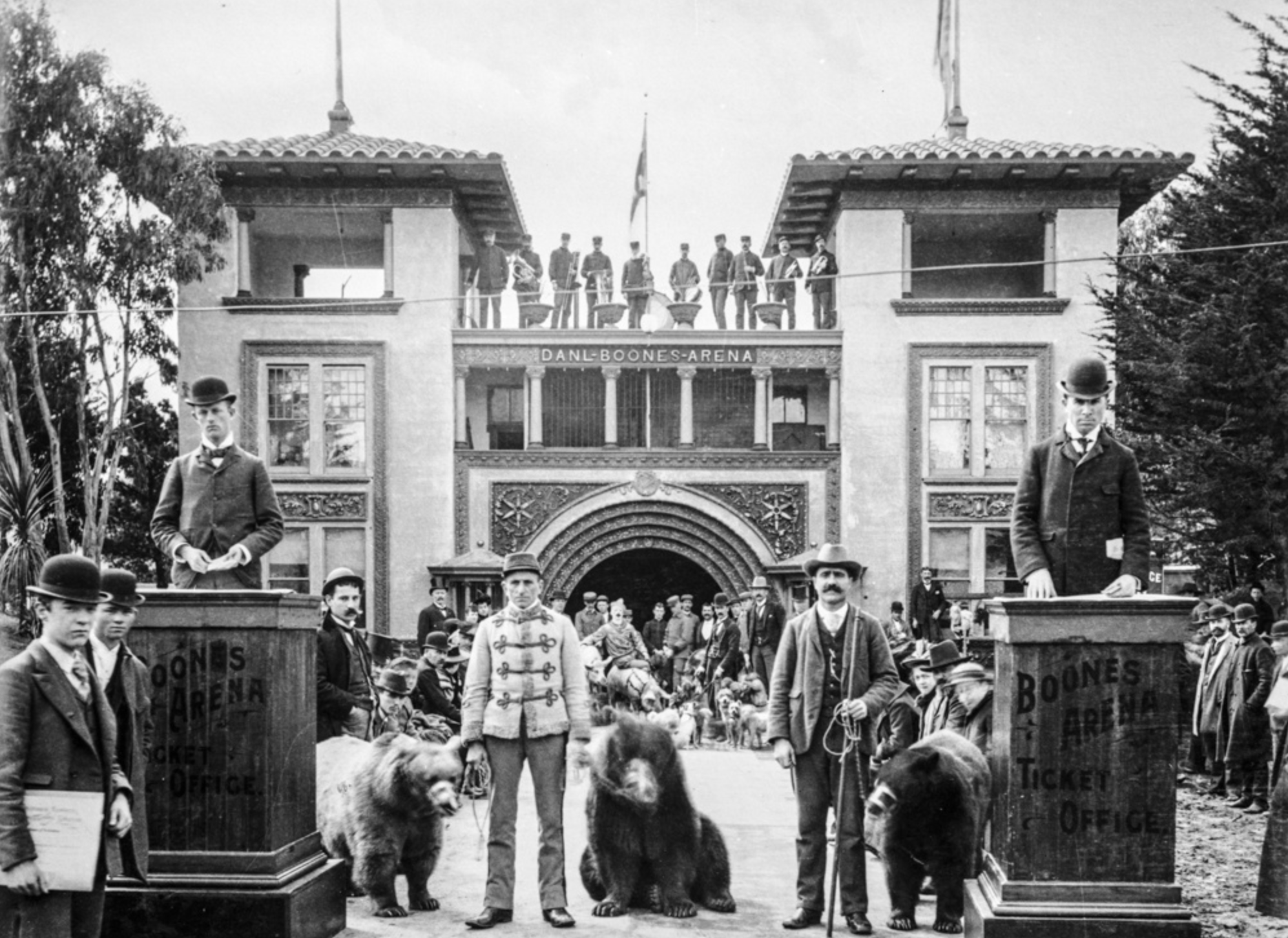
Col. Daniel E. Boone's Arena of Wild Animals

The Daniel Boone's Wild Animal Show was a popular show that had a "collection of trained and wild animals is simply wonderful and delights both young and old." It was centered around the lion trainer that it was named after. This show was also the site of one of the most violent events to occur at the fair. Carlo Thieman was an attendant at the lion exhibit at the show. In February, he was attending to the lions while in the cage with them, when the electric lights went out. The show usually kept lanterns lit nearby to deter lions from attacking in the dark, but for some unknown reason the lanterns were not there. The audience was present and heard the man's screams and calls for help, but they were too busy panicking at the horrific ordeal to help. Boone tried to enter the cage, but the door was stuck, delaying him several precious seconds. He finally entered the cage, hit the lions with metal bars, and shouted to get them to leave Thieman alone. Eventually, someone lit lanterns and the grisly scene was lit up for the onlookers to observe. Thieman had been scalped and scratched all over the body, the lions had tried to reach his vitals but narrowly missed. He was brought to Receiving Hospital, still alive, and regained consciousness. He told the details of how the biggest of the lions named Farnell had been the first to attack, and then the other two had followed suit. Thieman had 18 years of experience and the lions themselves were considered to be trained animals. After the attack, the performance was discontinued. Thieman died on February 14, 1894, due to his injuries.

=== Amusement rides ===
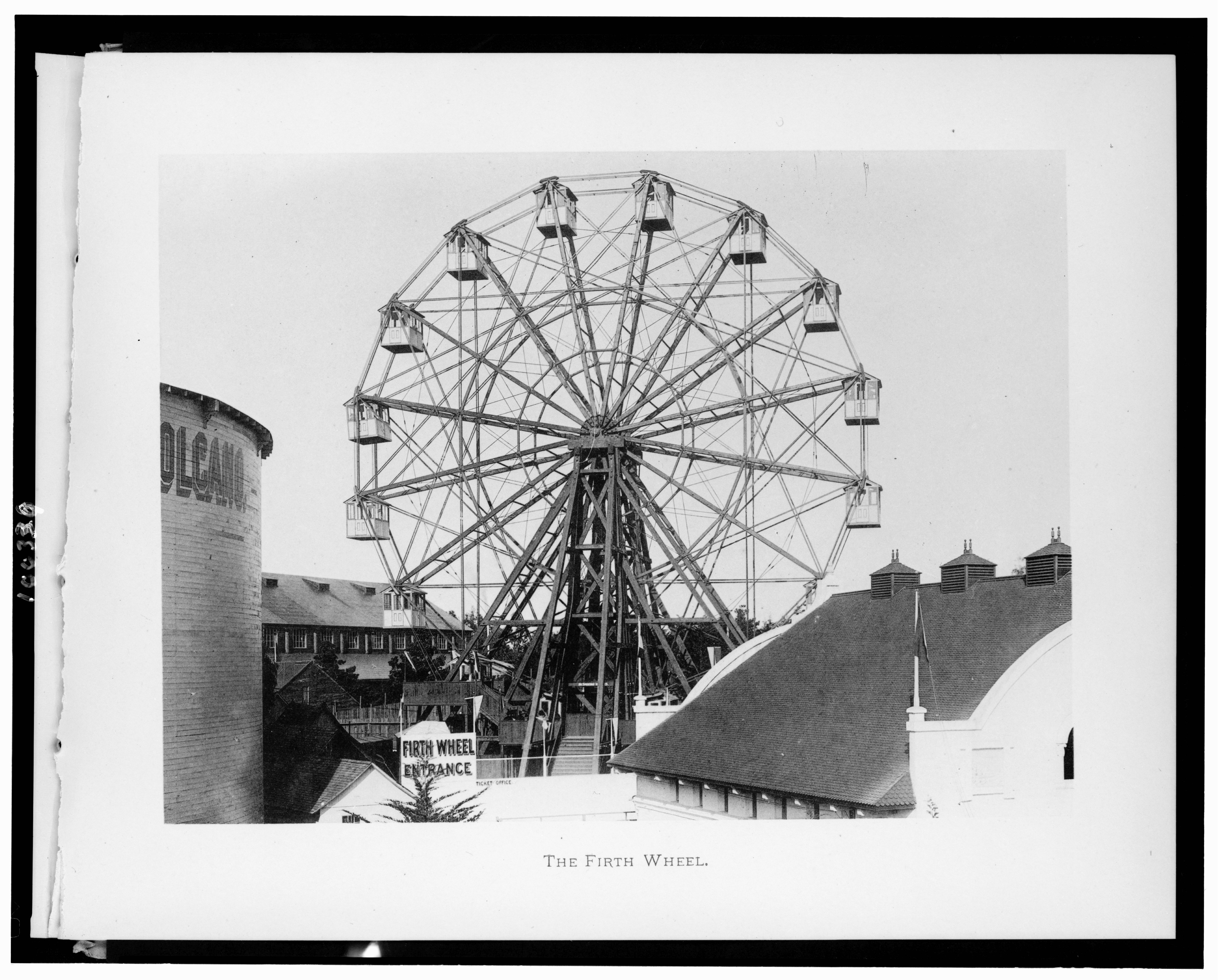
The Firth Wheel at the California Midwinter International Exposition of 1894

The Midwinter fair included amusement rides as part of the entertainment. Dante's Inferno was among the four amusement rides the fair offered. This scare exhibit had passengers enter through the mouth of a gold dragon head. The Firth Wheel, named after its designer and first referred to as the vertical merry-go-round, was a replication of the first ferris wheel built for the Chicago World Fair. The Firth wheel, standing at 120 feet above the ground and able to carry ten people per carriage, took up to twenty minutes to complete a full rotation. The scenic railway, another ride of the midwinter fair, was "an early wooden roller-coaster with a dozen undulating rises and dips". The passengers could "get a view of the entire Fair and a roller coaster ride at the same time".

=== The Haunted Swing ===
The Haunted Swing was a notable ride during 1894 in the San Francisco Chronicle. It was said to have caused riders to pray to the biblical saint of their choosing, as most were baffled by how the ride managed to appear to make the room spin 360-degrees vertically. Although the room surrounding the riders caused the riders to feel as though they were spinning, they actually never left a stationary position; the room in which the riders sat spun on an axis, creating the illusion.

=== Mining Camp ===
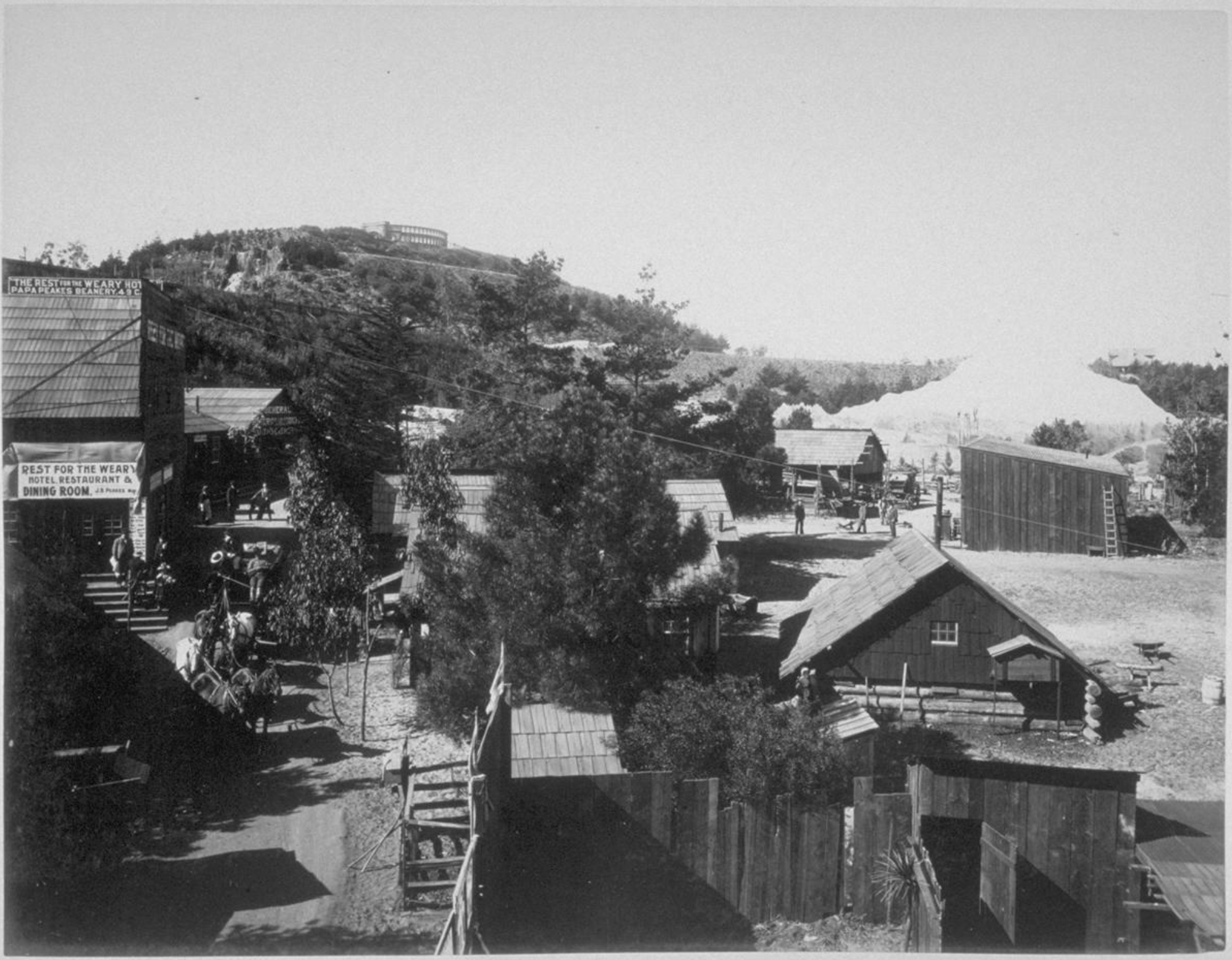
Mining camp

The Mining Camp was one of the most unique and popular exhibits in the fair. It was located on the North slope of Strawberry Hill and cost around $2,500 to construct. The Mining Camp provided food, games, and an interpretation of what life was like for California miners in 1849. Complete with a painted backdrop of Mount Shasta, the camp and many attractions such as a stagecoach which was held up daily by bandits, gambling tables, a dance hall, saloon, and gold-panning sluices. A man with a banjo sat on top of the stagecoach top. When the coach would stop, he would start to play "The Days of '49" and workers in the Mining Camp would join in during the chorus of "the days of old, the days of gold, the days of '49." The Mining Camp also housed replica cabins of famous California figures, such as American industrialist John W. Mackay, California senator George C. Perkins, and writer Mark Twain. The exhibit cost visitors an extra 25 cents to see, almost half of the 55-cent entry fee to the fair. The '49 Dance Hall and the '49 Theatre were extensions of the exhibit. Each cost an additional 25 cents to enter. The Camp even had its own newspaper called the Weekly Midwinter Appeal which was edited by Sam Davis. The dance hall was one of the most popular attraction within the Mining Camp. One reason for the popularity and appeal of the dance hall is the charming Spanish dancers. Exhibits like the dance hall allowed men to indulge in their fantasies.

==== Controversy ====
The Mining Camp was designed to let visitors experience what life was like in San Francisco before industrialization and immigrants started moving into the city. It was meant for people to reminisce on the "good old days" and let go of the anxieties of increasing job competition. "The days of old, the days of gold, the days of '49" was a slogan for the Mining Camp. It came from the popular song "The Days of '49," written by Tom Moore, which reminisced on the time of the Gold Rush. The ending of the song goes as follows: "Since that time how things have changed. In this land of liberty. Darkies didn't vote nor plead in court. Nor rule this country; But the Chinese question, the worst of all, In those days did not shine, For the country was right and the boys all white. In the days of '49." These last lines of the song represent some of the controversy with the camp. Some people argue that the Mining Camp whitewashed the history of the Gold Rush by not including people of color and made people long for the days before where minorities did not have many privileges.

=== The Gum Girls ===
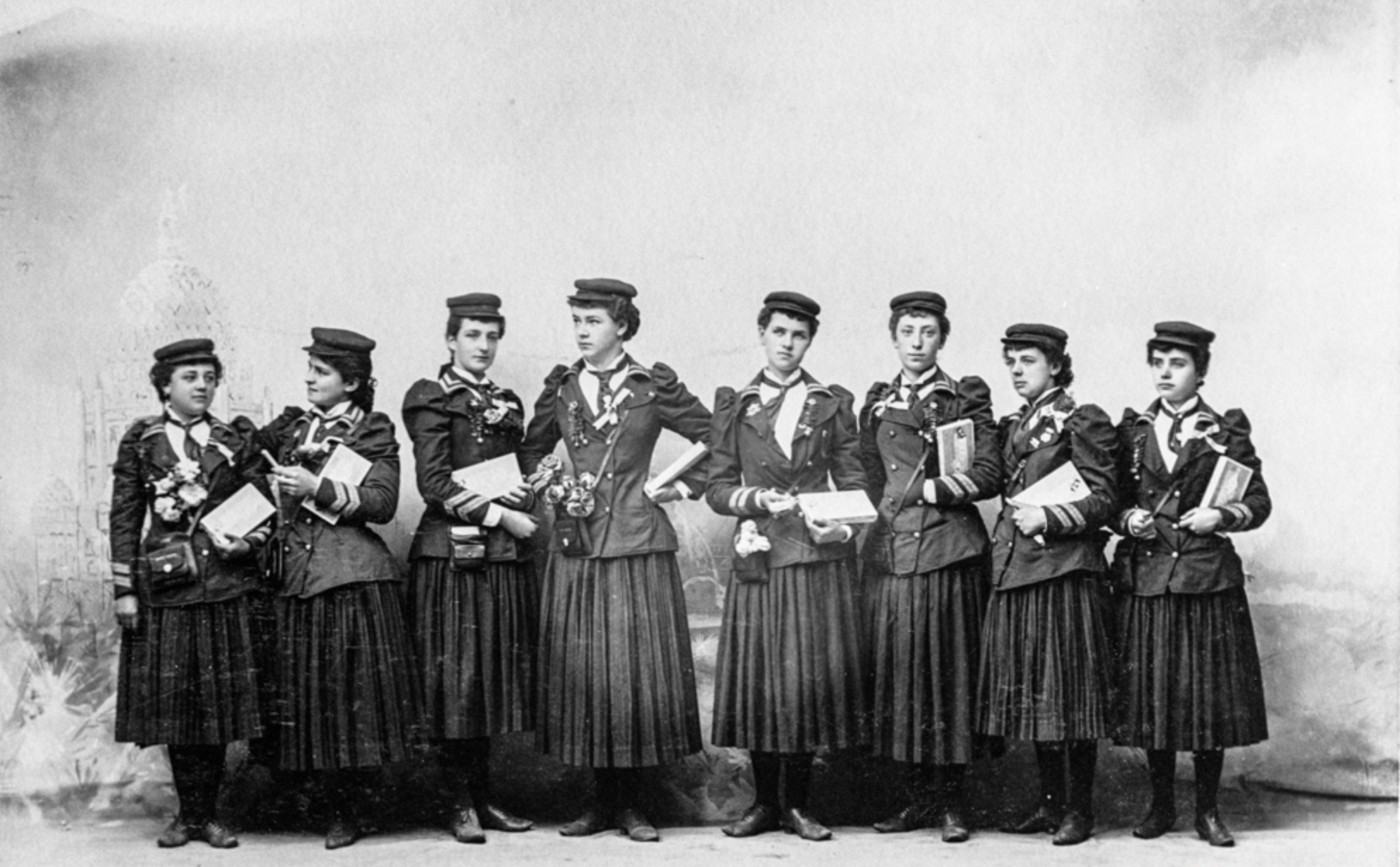
Gum Girls

One controversial feature of the Midwinter Exhibition were the gum girls. These young women would walk around selling chewing gum to the attendees of the fair. They wore blue dresses, black stockings, and coordinating caps. To many at the time, their dresses were considered short for revealing their ankles. The gum girls were known to flirt with men all around the fairgrounds as a way to sell their gum. An article from The Examiner even advised men that the gum girls would provide them with enjoyable flirtations while they are at the fair. The girls had a song they all whistled that was called "Two Little Girls in Blue," and they whistled it whenever they made a sale. This song was heard so frequently that it was whistled by people all over the park.

Throughout their time at the fair, the gum girls were often subjected to danger and unwanted attention. The girls would travel in pairs in order to keep men from getting too touchy or aggressive. In one case, a gum girl by the name of Violet Eilids had the necktie of her dress grabbed by a man. As a reaction to this unwanted advancement, Eilids punched him in the face and broke his nose.

== Ethnological exhibits ==
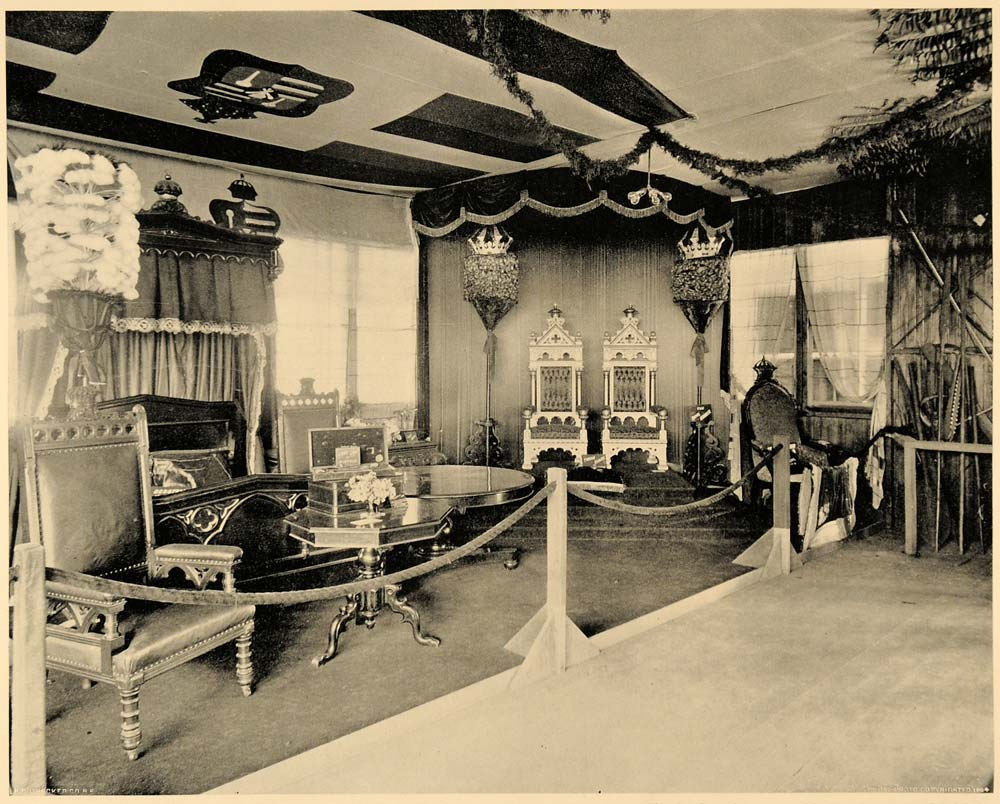
Hawaiian Village Exhibit

In the late 1800s, ethnological exhibitions began to develop as a form of public entertainment and cultural education on non-Western lifestyles. These exhibits showcased groups of individuals from various places all over the world in exhibits designed to mimic their homes. The inhabitants of many of the exhibits would remain in the exhibit until the end of the fair. The Midwinter Exposition of 1894 featured several ethnological expositions: the Hawaiian village, the Dahomeyan African village, various Japanese cultural exhibits, the Vienna Prater, the Arizona Indian Village, the Sioux Indian Village, the Oriental Village, a German Village, a Samoan Village, and the Eskimo/Inuit Village. The ethnological exhibits sparked controversy, particularly from the racial communities that identified with the ethnic groups on display. Many argued that the portrayal of these people groups were stereotypical, reductive, and racist, drawing criticism from Frederick Douglass and San Francisco's Japanese population. Furthermore, treatment of the people living in the exhibitions was criticized, though little action could be taken as the people living there were there of their own accord.

=== Dahomeyan Village ===
The Dahomeyan Village showcased Africans from French Congo, French Guinea, and Benin. These individuals were recruited by Xavier Pené, a French ivory trader and labor contractor who was permitted to exhibit an African village after putting on the same exhibit for the Chicago World Fair the previous year. There were 67 individuals in the Dahomeyan village, with four deaths throughout the duration of the exhibit. Frederick Douglass both condemned and praised the Dahomeyan Village, stating on separate occasions that it was "as if to shame the Negro [that] the Dahomians are also here to exhibit the Negro as a repulsive savage" and that "the Africans' dance and ceremonies which were all on the same principle, if not quite so well developed, as those of people living nearer to civilization." Douglass's remarks directed public attention towards the negative inner-workings of the cultural exhibits.

=== Marsh's Japanese Village & Tea Garden ===
Marsh's Japanese Village & Tea Garden, along with the Fine Arts building which later became the deYoung museum, are the only remnants of the Midwinter Fair that remain in Golden Gate Park. Today it is officially known as the Japanese Tea Garden. George Turner Marsh, an Australian businessman interested in Japanese culture, organized and funded the Japanese Village and Tea Garden for the Midwinter Fair of 1894. During the time of the fair, Marsh and a Japanese artist named Toshio Aoki designed and maintained the village as an attraction.

Inside the village in 1894, the village consisted of small man-made waterfalls, small lakes, the Taiko Bashi (drum bridge), and various Japanese-native plants and birds such as Tsurus and O'Hikis. As a part of the exhibit, there were Japanese women dressed up as the "Musumee" are in the exhibit's tea village. Common items served were Japanese tea and "sweetmeats". At the time, the exhibit accepted entry for 25 cents an adult and 10 cents for children, tea and treats included. Marsh also envisioned a Japanese form of transportation in the fair to the village, and hired workers to roll Jinrickshas.

==== Controversy ====
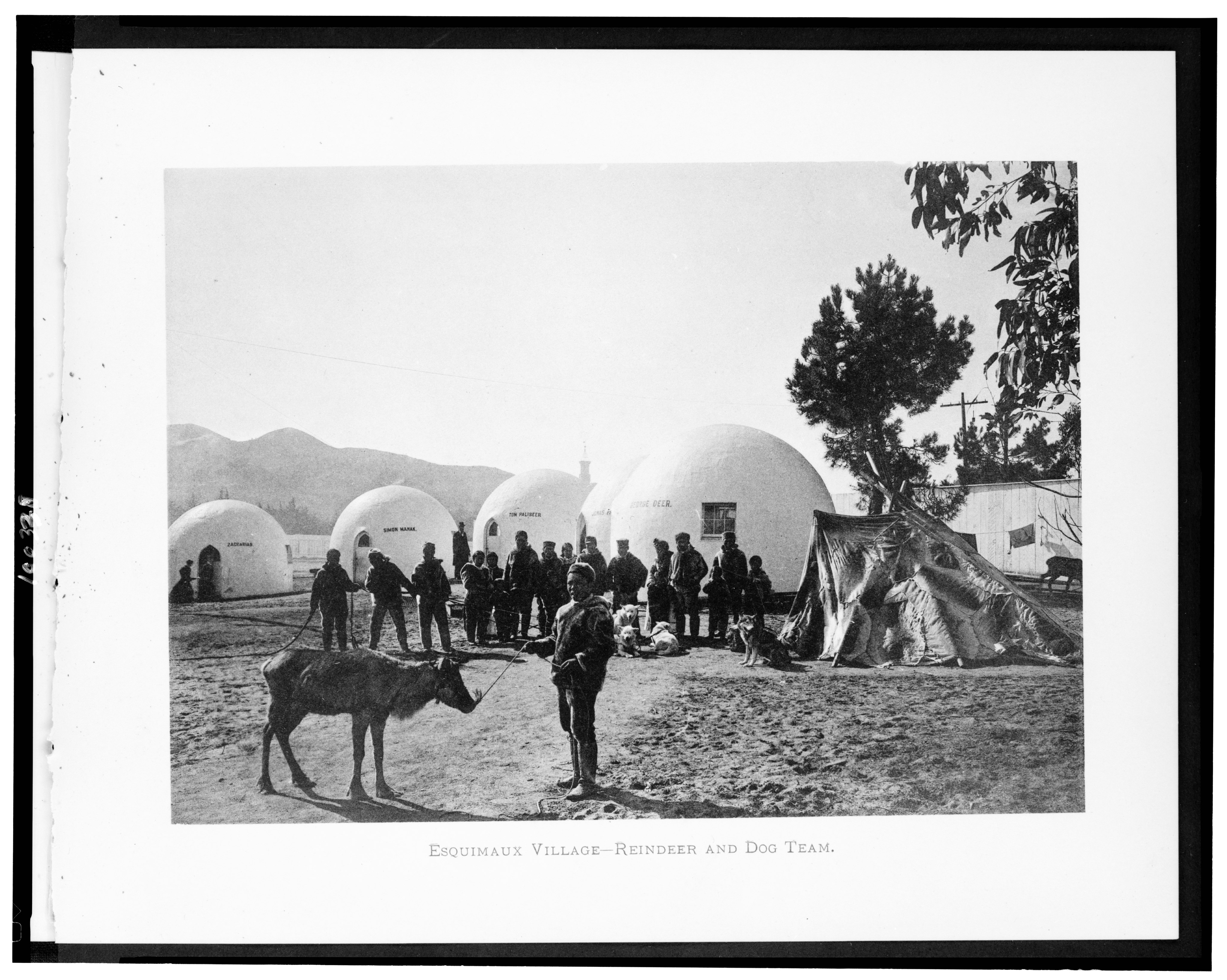
Eskimaux Village with reindeer and dog team

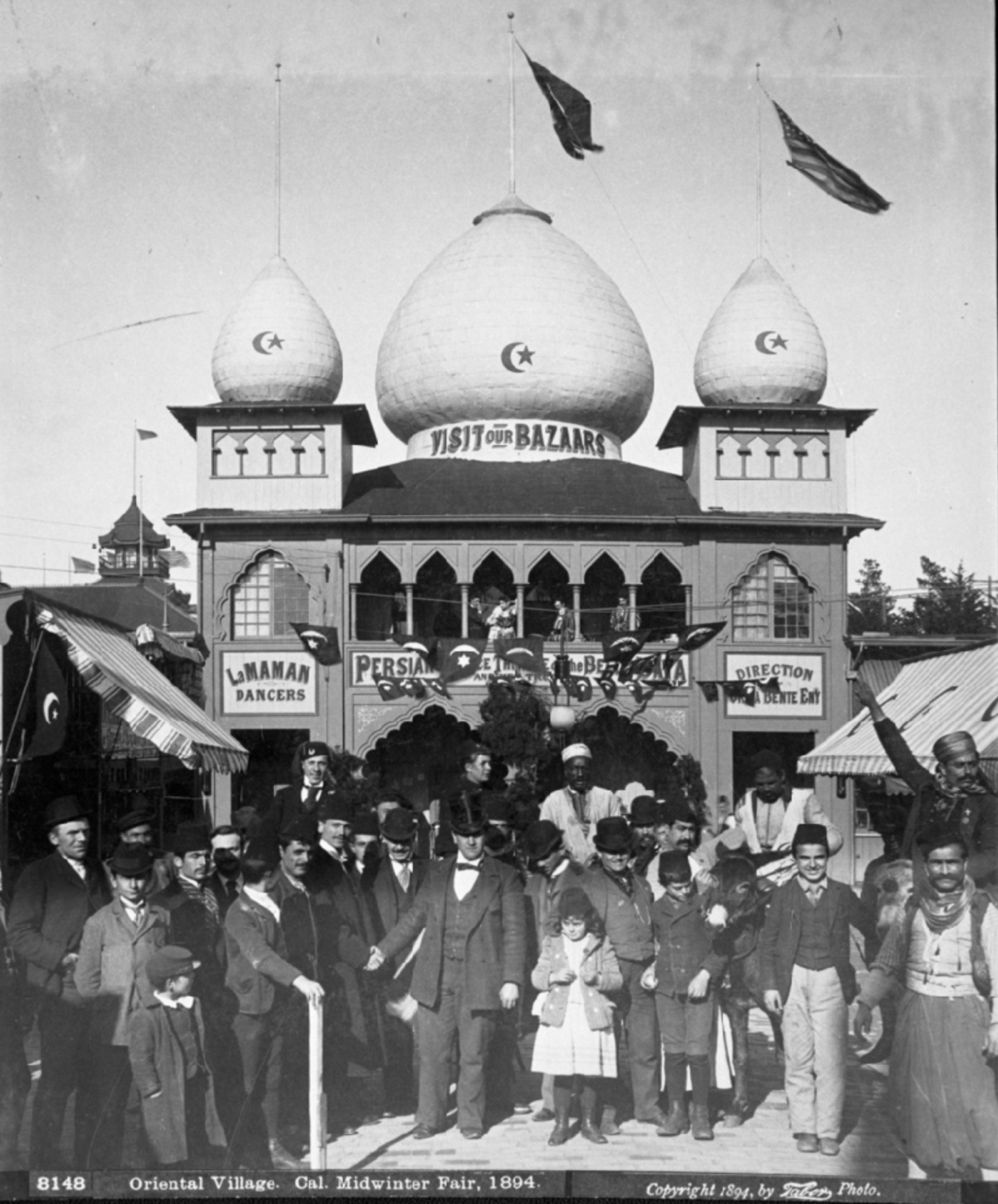
The "Oriental Village" in front of the "Persian Palace Theatre of the Belle Baya and her Troop"

During the Midwinter Fair, there was controversy surrounding the Japanese Village and Tea Garden. The main issue was the use of rickshaws in the attraction, specifically, George Marsh hiring Japanese men to pull American fair-goers around in rickshaws. Members of the Japanese community were extremely offended, claiming that "it was acceptable for Japanese to pull people around in Japan, but in America such a job was suitable only for horses and was an insult to the emperor." Those upset with Marsh decided to form an Anti-Jinrikishaw Society, announcing that any Japanese who decided to pull a rickshaw would be killed. Marsh avoided the problem completely by hiring Germans to pull the tourists around, he also "darkened their faces and dressed them in oriental garb."

=== Eskimo Village ===
The Eskimo Village (or Eskimaux Village), was three acres large and featured Inuit from Labrador, Canada. The Inuit villagers in the exhibit lived in huts designed to look like igloos and seal-skin tents. Visitors to the exhibit could ride on a dog-drawn sled around a circular track.

=== Oriental Village ===
The Oriental Village featured Turkish, Greek, Algerian, Persian, and Egyptian cultures. The central axis of the exhibit was Cairo street, based on an Egyptian market street. The street was lined by storefronts and inhabited by shopkeepers and people paid to enact daily street life, including a fortune-teller. Beyond the Egyptian-inspired Cairo street was the "Persian Palace Theater" and dance hall, which featured performances by Turkish dancers. Outside the front of the building, a small bazaar-style marketplace where Turkish, Greek, and Algerian vendors sold various wares.

=== Hawaiian Village ===
The centerpiece of the Hawaiian Village was a cyclorama painted to look like an erupting Mount Kilauea where performers danced, chanted, and performed religious rituals daily for the visitors. Also included in the exhibit were grass-covered bamboo huts, the Hawaiian Palace, coffee trees, hula dancers, and a display depicting the history of the Hawaiian Kamehameha dynasty as well as showcasing various weapons of war. A rectangular artificial lake was dug out in the southern corner of the exhibit, providing an area for the exhibit's inhabitants to showcase canoe maneuvers to visitors. The Hawaiian Palace was furnished with imported Hawaiian furniture and wares.

== Food ==
The cuisine of the Midwinter Exposition was as diverse as the rest of the world fair. Restaurants operated in the Chinese, Japanese, and Oriental Villages, in the Old Heidelberg, at the Firth Wheel, and at the base of Bonet's Tower among other places. There were additional kiosks and vendors from which fair attendees could buy food. The cultural exhibits provided exotic meals that were exceptionally popular among fair goers. It was also quite common to bring food from home and picnic in the park.

== The Fair's legacy ==
Upon the conclusion of the Midwinter Exposition, Park Superintendent John McLaren took his revenge for what was done to his park. McLaren had created Golden Gate Park with the intention of making it a natural escape within the city, and to him, the development of the fair ruined its natural scenery. Although the management of the fair agreed to restore the park grounds, they didn't follow through with this promise. McLaren himself had most of the one hundred buildings torn down and the concrete foundations dug up. He feared Bonet's Tower would become a permanent attraction in his park, so he had it dynamited and sold for scrap. However, McLaren spared some structures that can still be seen in the park today. The Fine Arts Building, which used to be the De Young Museum (removed and rebuilt after the 1989 earthquake), the Japanese Village, along with multiple statues and parts of the Court of Honor still exist in the park.

Mayor Adolph Sutro saved some attractions of the fair before McLaren's destruction. Sutro purchased the Camera Obscura, the Firth Wheel, Dante's Inferno, the Mirror Maze, along with multiple other Midway attractions and had them relocated to the Sutro Baths which opened in 1896.

=== Remaining sculptures ===
Many works of art from the Midwinter Fair can still be seen at Golden Gate Park today. Some of the sculptures remaining include the Apple Cider Press, Roman Gladiator, Prayer Book Cross, Doré Vase, and two sphinxes. The Doré Vase, created by French sculptor Gustave Doré, is an 11-foot bronze sculpture that speaks to the valued process of winemaking. The Apple Cider Press, a monument created by American artist Thomas Shields Clarke, was said to be a working cider fountain during the fair. Both the Doré Vase and the Apple Cider Press can be seen in front of the De Young museum today. The third sculpture was traditionally called Roman Gladiator. This bronze sculpture, created by George Geefs in 1884, has been identified as Leonidas, King of Sparta. It was exhibited at the 1894 Midwinter Fair, and then moved to the spot where Michael de Young turned the first spade of dirt to begin construction of the fair. The Prayer Book Cross, created by Ernest Coxhead, is a 57-foot sandstone Celtic cross that was a gift from the Church of England to commemorate the first Anglican service held in the English language in California.

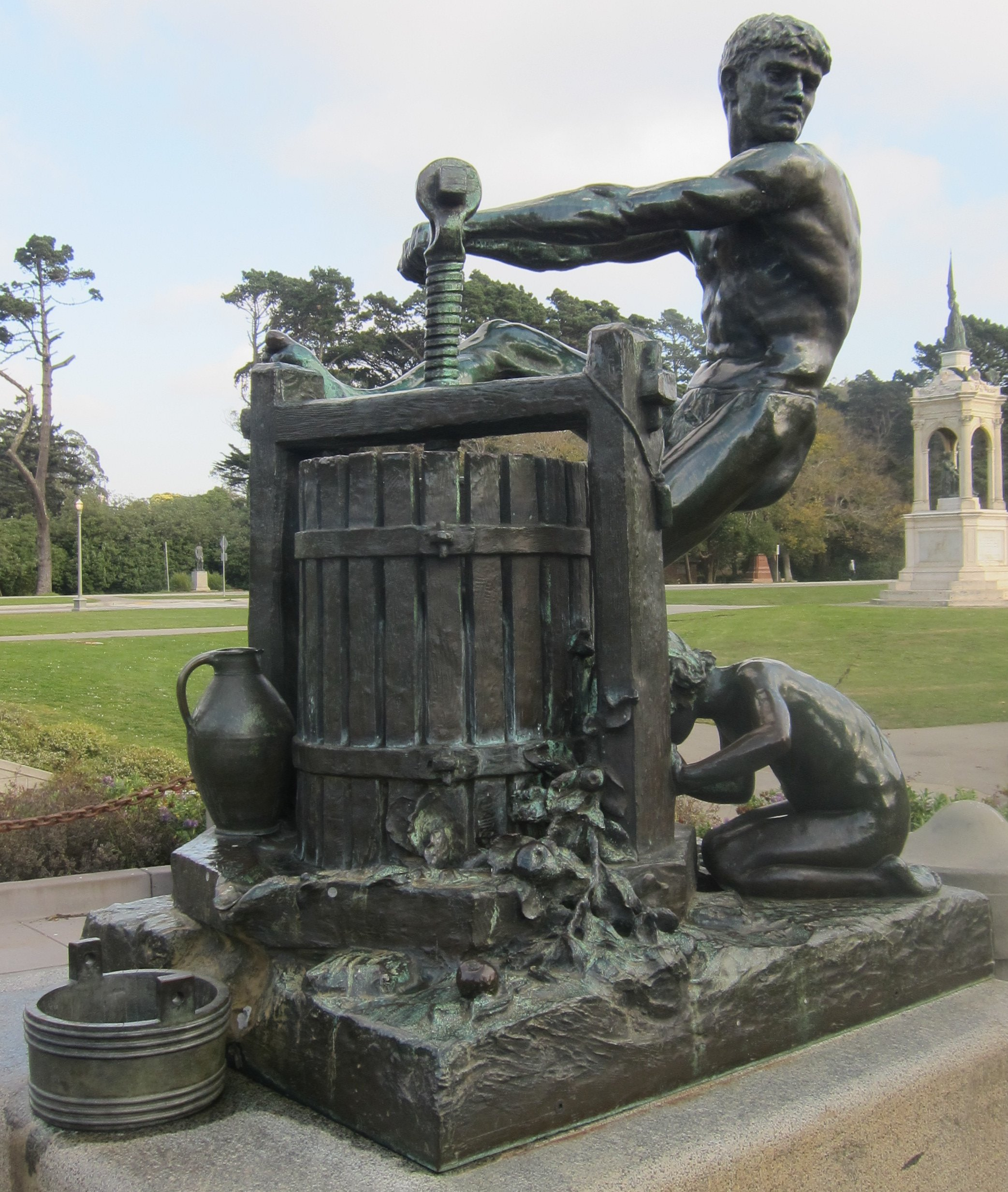
Apple Cider Press by Thomas Shields Clarke

Sphinxes by Arthur Putnam

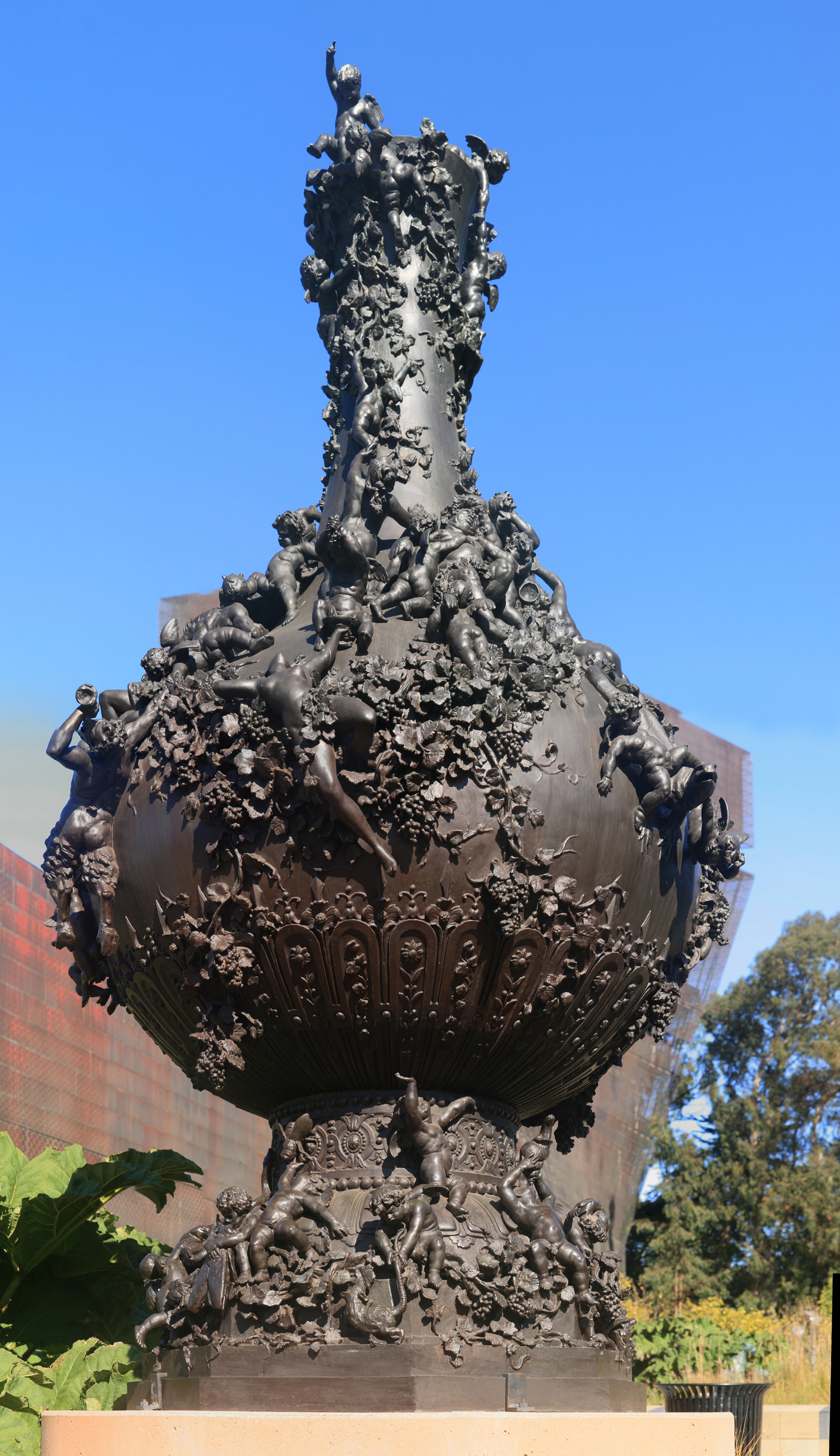
Doré Vase by Gustave Doré

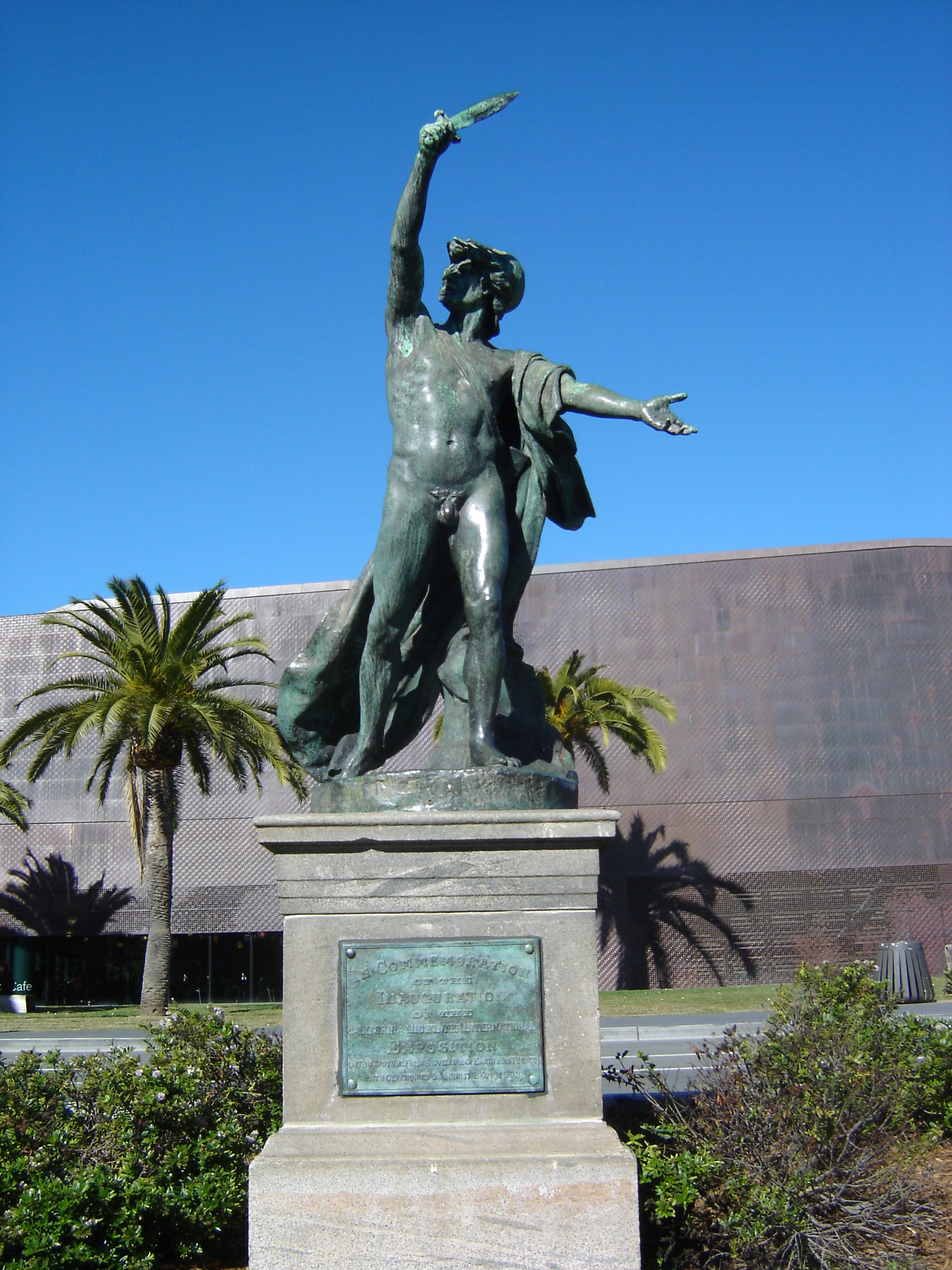
Roman Gladiator by George Geefs
