= Gen. Robert Macfeely House =

Historic house in Washington, D.C., United States

- Gen. Robert MacFeely House
- U.S. National Register of Historic Places
- D.C. Inventory of Historic Sites
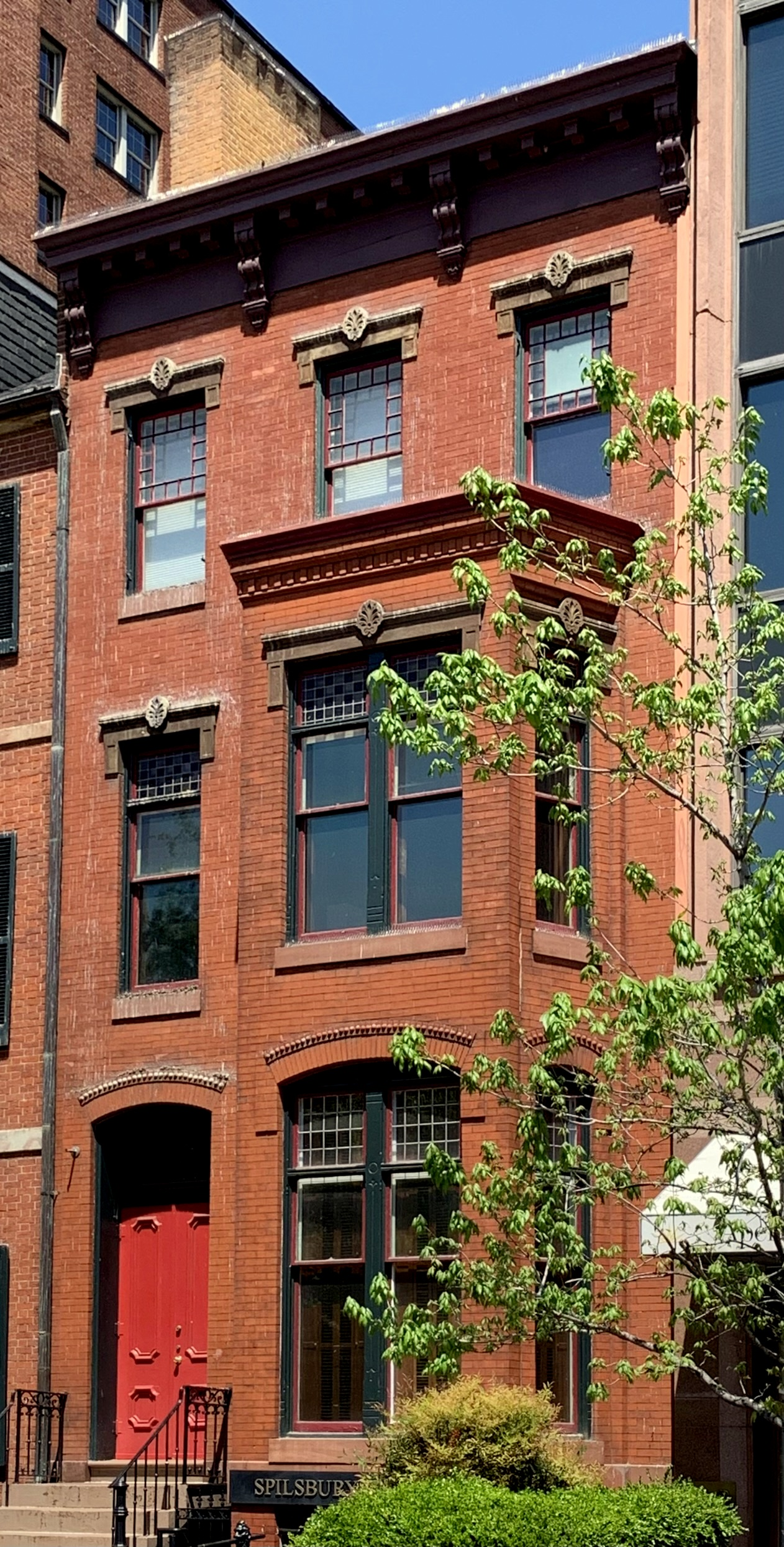
- General Robert MacFeely House in 2022

- Location within Washington, D.C.
- Location: 2015 I St., NW; Washington, D.C.
- Coordinates: 38°54′5.4″N 77°2′44.25″W
- Built: c. 1860
- Architectural style: Late Victorian
- NRHP reference No.: 89001214

Significant dates
- Added to NRHP: September 15, 1989
- Designated DCIHS: May 18, 1983

== Description ==
Gen. Robert MacFeely House is a historic residence located at 2015 I St., Northwest, Washington, D.C. The house was built around 1860 and was altered between 1881 and 1929. The House is named after the most notable occupant, Brigadier General Robert Macfeely (or MacFeely) (1826–1901), who presided in the house from 1876 until his death in 1901. It has been listed on the District of Columbia Inventory of Historic Sites since 1983 and it was listed on the National Register of Historic Places in 1989. In 1929 the house was joined with the Cleveland Abbe House and the two properties now form the site of the Arts Club of Washington.

== History ==
The house was built around the year 1860 and the earliest recording of an owner was in listed tax records from 1870 which had shown the owner of this lot as Thomas P. Morgan. Brigadier General Robert Macfeely moved into the house in 1881. Macfeely was most well known as Chief Commissary of Subsistence with the rank of brigadier general which he was meritoriously advanced to in April 1875. Macfeely held this position until his retirement in July of 1890 while he was living in the house. After his death, a private citizen named Edgar M. Peterson moved in; he stayed until its purchase in 1929 by the Arts Club of Washington.
