= Robert Macfeely =

US Army brigadier general (1826–1901)

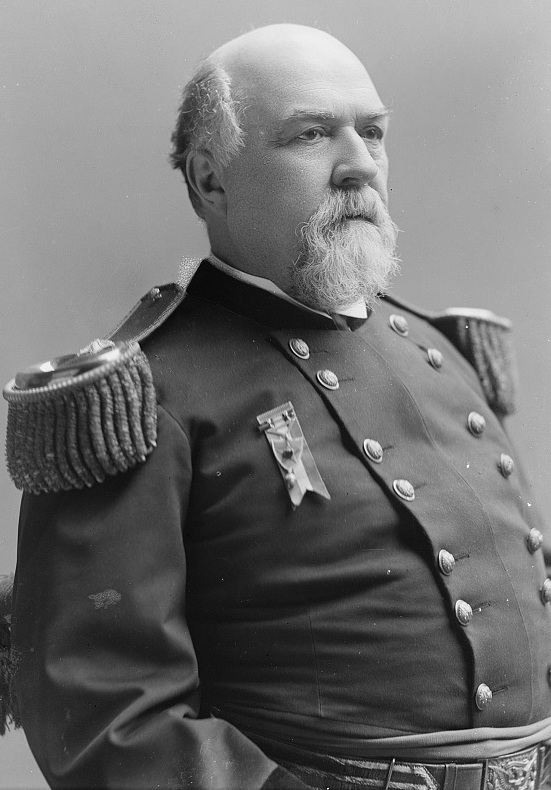
- Macfeely circa 1885
- Born: 1 July 1826; Carlisle, Pennsylvania, US
- Died: 21 February 1901 (aged 74); Washington, D.C., US
- Burial place: Arlington National Cemetery
- Alma mater: United States Military Academy
- Spouse: Josephine Beatty (m. 1857–1901)
- Military career
- Allegiance: United States; Union (American Civil War)
- Service: United States Army; Union Army
- Service years: 1805–1861, 1865–1890 (US Army); 1861–1865 (Union Army)
- Rank: Brigadier General
- Units: US Army Infantry Branch; US Army Subsistence Department
- Commands: Chief Commissary of Indiana; Chief Commissary, Department of Western Virginia; Chief Commissary, District of Ohio; Chief Commissary, XV Corps; Chief Commissary, Army of the Tennessee; Chief Commissary, Department of Tennessee; Chief Commissary, Department of the Ohio; Chief Commissary, Department of the Lakes; US Army Commissary General of Subsistence
- Wars: American Civil War; American Indian Wars

Robert Macfeely (1 July 1826 – 21 February 1901) was a career officer in the United States Army. A veteran of the American Indian Wars and American Civil War, he served from 1850 to 1890 and attained the rank of brigadier general. Originally commissioned in the Infantry, during the Civil War Macfeely began to specialize in Commissary duties, and he served as the army's Commissary General of Subsistence from 1875 until his retirement.

A native of Carlisle, Pennsylvania and the son of a War of 1812 veteran, Macfeely was raised and educated in Carlisle and began attendance at the United States Military Academy (West Point) in 1846. He graduated in 1850 and served in Oregon and Washington during the Yakima War of 1855 to 1858. During the Civil War, he was assigned to commissary officer duties and he served as chief commissary of several corps, departments, and districts.

After the war, Macfeely continued to serve in the Commissary department with assignments in Chicago and Detroit. In May 1875, Macfeely was appointed as the army's commissary general, and he held this post until reaching the mandatory retirement age of 64 in 1890.In retirement, he was a resident of Washington, D.C. Macfeely died in Washington on 22 February 1901. He was buried at Arlington National Cemetery.

== Early life ==
Robert Macfeely was born in Carlisle, Pennsylvania on 1 July 1826, a son of George McFeely, who commanded a regiment during the War of 1812, and Margaret (McKeen) McFeely. (Note: Robert Macfeely began using "Macfeely" after graduating from West Point in 1850. Siblings later adopted his spelling.) (Note: Maraget McFeely's maiden name appears in various records as McKeen, McKean, McCann, etc.) He was raised and educated in Carlisle, then worked as a clerk at the Carlisle post office.

In 1846, Macfeely began attendance attending the United States Military Academy at West Point. He graduated in 1850 ranked 31st of 44. Among his classmates who attained American Civil War prominence or became prominent in the 40 years afterward were Gouverneur K. Warren, Cuvier Grover, Adam J. Slemmer, Richard Arnold, Lucius M. Walker, Armistead Lindsay Long, Robert Ransom, Eugene Asa Carr, William Carlin, Charles Sidney Winder, Elisha Marshall, Nicholas Bartlett Pearce, William Lewis Cabell, and Alfred Mouton.

== Start of career ==
In July 1850, Macfeely was appointed a second lieutenant of Infantry by brevet. He served in the garrison at Fort Brady, Michigan from 1850 to 1852 and at Fort Columbus, New York in 1852. In July 1852, he was commissioned as a second lieutenant in the 4th Infantry Regiment and assigned to American Indian Wars frontier duty at Fort Dalles, Oregon, where he served until 1855. In 1853 and 1854 he commanded troops that escorted a team conducting exploration for a proposed railroad to the Pacific. In 1854, he participated in scouting expeditions against the Snake Indians.

While serving with the 4th Infantry, Macfeely became friendly with several officers who later influenced his career progression, including Ulysses S. Grant and Philip Sheridan. Grant thought highly enough of Macfeely to loan him money when several companies of the 4th Infantry traveled from New York through Panama to the Pacific Northwest in 1852. Macfeely was promoted to first lieutenant in February 1855, and he took part in that year's Yakima War expeditions. He served at Fort Vancouver, Washington from 1855 to 1856 and at Fort Orford, Oregon in 1856. In 1856, he took part in an expedition against the Oregon Indians during the Rogue River Wars. From 1856 to 1861, Macfeely was posted to Fort Vancouver and assigned as the 4th Infantry's quartermaster.

== Continued career ==
Macfeely served in the Union Army throughout the American Civil War, beginning with duty as mustering officer duty in Frederick, Maryland in April 1861. He served as commissary officer for the state of Indiana in May and June, 1861 and took part in the Western Virginia campaign of June to October 1861 as commissary officer for the Department of the Ohio. Macfeely was promoted to captain in May 1861. He served as chief commissary officer for the Department of Western Virginia and the District of Ohio in October and November 1861, followed by assignment as commissary officer for the state of Indiana from December 1861 to February 1862.

From February to December 1862, Macfeely served as chief commissary officer for the Army of the Ohio. From January to April 1863, he was chief commissary officer for the XV Army Corps. He was promoted to major in February 1863. From April 1863 to September 1864, Macfeely was assigned as chief commissary officer for the Department of Tennessee and Army of the Tennessee, including the Vicksburg campaign and Chattanooga campaign. In October and November 1864, Macfeely served in Washington, D.C. as assistant to the army's commissary general. From December 1864 to September 1866, Macfeely served as purchasing commissary officer and depot commissary officer for the Department of the Ohio, with responsibility for commissary of subsistence activities in Ohio, Indiana, and Illinois. He received brevet promotions to lieutenant colonel and colonel, both effective 13 March 1865, as recognition of the meritorious and commendable service he rendered throughout the war.

== Later career ==
Macfeely served as purchasing commissary in Detroit and chief commissary for the Department of the Lakes from September 1866 to June 1867. He was then assigned as purchasing and depot commissary in Chicago, where he served from June 1867 to March 1875. In April 1875, he was promoted to brigadier general and succeeded Alexander E. Shiras as the army's commissary general of subsistence. He was appointed over several commissary officers who were senior to him, in keeping with President Grant's practice of advancing the careers of individuals who had served with him in the 4th Infantry before the Civil War, including Macfeely as commissary general, Benjamin Alvord as paymaster-general, Sheridan as commander of the Military Division of the Missouri, and George Crook as commander of the Department of Arizona. Macfeely served as commissary general until reaching the mandatory retirement age of 64 in July 1890.

In retirement, Macfeely was a resident of Washington, D.C. and was a member of veterans associations including the Society of the Army of the Tennessee. In 1895, Elizabeth Flagler, the daughter of Brigadier General Daniel Webster Flagler, was tried for the killing of Ernest Green, one of several African American boys she shot at when she observed them stealing pears from her father's garden. Macfeely served as one of her sureties when she posted bond; she was convicted of manslaughter, paid a $500 fine, and served three hours in the District of Columbia jail.

In 1899, Macfeely testified before investigators looking into the United States Army beef scandal that occurred during the Spanish–American War. According to Macfeely's recollection and documentation, in 1878 the army adopted the use of canned meat for situations in which soldiers on the move could not obtain beef "on the hoof" or had no way to cook their meals. This contradicted the testimony of Charles P. Eagan, who said canned beef was supposed to be used only in stews and soups, and Charles Woodruff a Civil War veteran who claimed that in his experience the army never furnished live cattle to troops.

Macfeely died in Washington on 22 February 1901. He was buried at Arlington National Cemetery. His Washington, D.C. home, the Gen. Robert Macfeely House, was added to the National Register of Historic Places in 1989. Macfeely's home and the nearby Cleveland Abbe House were combined to form the location of the Arts Club of Washington.

== Dates of rank ==
Macfeely's dates of rank were:

- Second Lieutenant (Brevet), 1 July 1850
- Second Lieutenant, 13 July1852
- First Lieutenant, 3 February 1851
- Captain, 11 May 1861
- Major, 9 February 1863
- Lieutenant Colonel (Brevet), 13 March 1865
- Colonel (Brevet), 13 March 1865
- Brigadier General, 14 April 1875
- Brigadier General (Retired), 1 July 1890
