= Lenthall Houses =

Historic houses in Washington, D.C., United States

- U.S. National Register of Historic Places
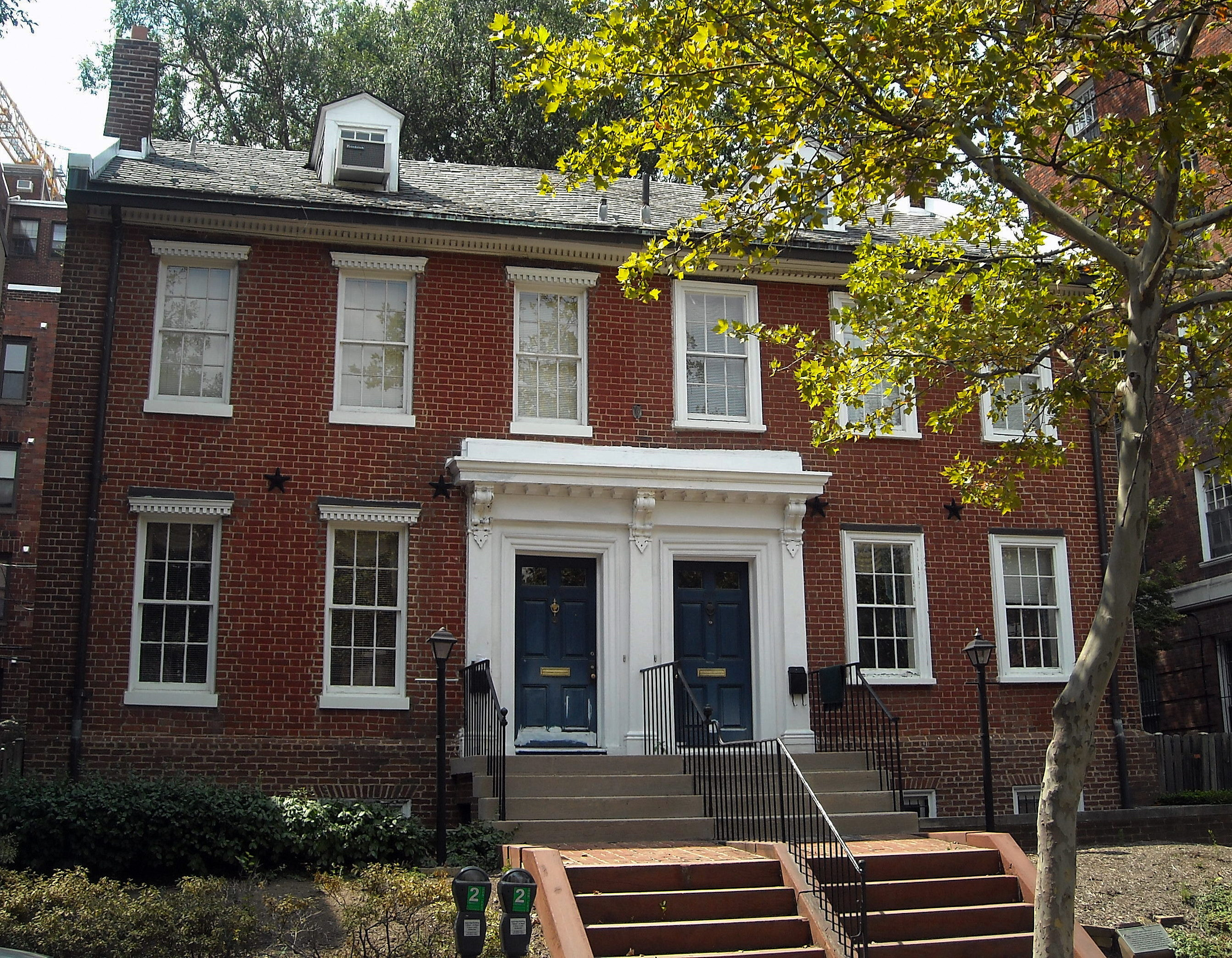

- Location within Washington, D.C. Location within the United States
- Location: 606–610 21Street NW; Washington, D.C.
- Coordinates: 38°53′52″N 77°2′49″W
- Area: less than one acre
- Built: c. 1800
- Architect: John Lenthall
- Architectural style: Federal
- NRHP reference No.: 72001425
- Added to NRHP: March 16, 1972

The Lenthall Houses are historic houses on the George Washington University campus in Washington, D.C. The adjacent houses were built around 1800 and they were moved to their current location and restored between 1978 and 1979. It has been listed on the District of Columbia Inventory of Historic Sites since 1964 and it was listed on the National Register of Historic Places in 1972.

== History ==
The attached houses were built at the same time around 1800 by John Lenthall. They were originally located at 612–14 19th Street NW. Lenthall was a trained architect who was born in England in 1762 and was the great-grandson of Sir William Lenthall, who was Speaker of the House of Commons. (Note: Several sources claim that his father, also called William Lenthall, was the Speaker of the House of Commons as well.) He moved to Washington around 1793 and was chosen by Benjamin Latrobe as his principal assistant on his project to build the United States Capitol in 1803. His wife, Jane King, whom he married in either 1801 or 1802, was the daughter and sister of the surveyors of the District of Columbia. Lenthall was killed in September 1808 when one of the arches in the Supreme Court chamber collapsed.

The house at 610 21st Street NW stayed in the Lenthall family until 1902 when it was sold. It was eventually purchased by Washington artist Bertha Noyes. The Arts Club of Washington was founded in her home in 1916. Noyes deeded the property to George Washington University upon her death in 1966. The house at 606 21st Street, NW was deeded to William Francis in August 1808. He in turn deeded the property away the following day. George Washington University acquired the house in the 1970s. The structures were moved to their current location on August 5, 1978.

== Architecture ==
The houses were designed in the Federal architectural style. They were designed as a single unit and they share a common roof and cornice line. The exterior is covered in red brick laid in Flemish bond. They are two stories in height and include an attic and a basement. The grey saddleback roof features two wooden dormers, one on each house. Both the north and the south gables have two chimneys each. A brick partition wall was built between the two house up to the attic where a partition of a lath and plaster separates the two houses. The main facade is six bays wide, with three bays belonging to each house. The two entrance doors are adjacent to each other in the center of the facade. The white wooden trim surrounding the doorways was changed in the second half of the nineteenth century.
