= Mary Gine Riley =

American painter

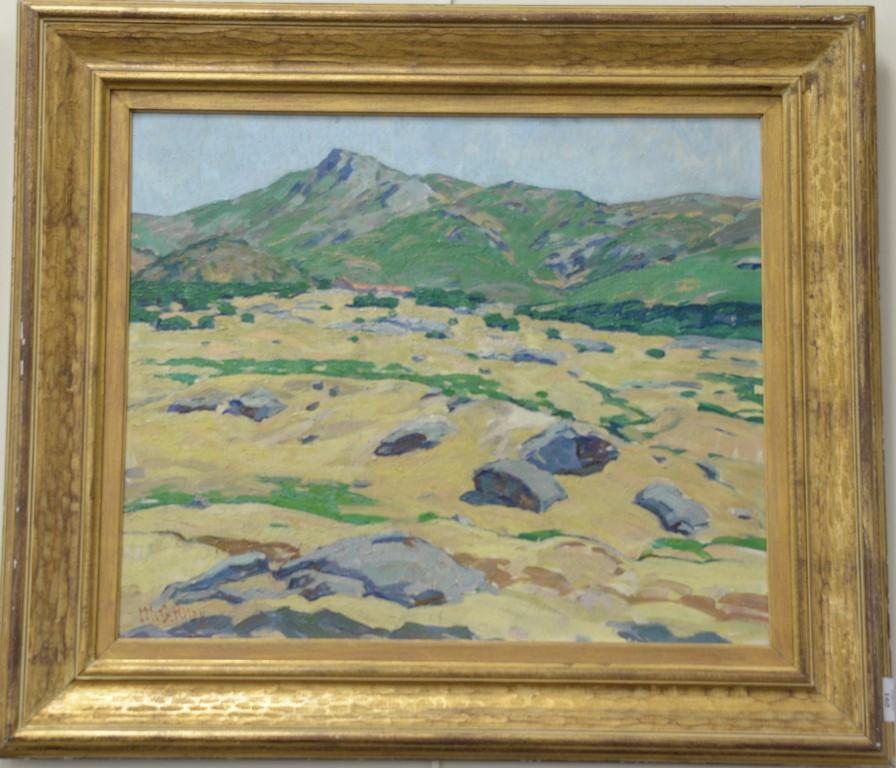
Mary Gine Riley (1883-1939), oil on board, mountainous landscape, signed lower left: M.G. Riley, 20" x 24".

Mary Gine Riley (April 22, 1883 - February 1, 1939) was an American painter. Her middle name is sometimes given as Grimes.

Riley was born in Washington, D.C., the daughter of Charles Valentine Riley and Emilie Conzelman Riley, and spent most of her life in that city. A 1904 graduate of Wellesley College, she studied art at the Corcoran School of Art from 1907 to 1908, from 1910 to 1911, and in 1913; she also studied in New York with L. Birge Harrison and Henry Bayley Snell. In 1911, she first exhibited work with the Society of Washington Artists, on whose governing board she would serve for a number of years and whose vice-president she became in 1930. She was also a charter member of the Arts Club of Washington, at which she also exhibited. Riley showed work at the Corcoran Biennial from 1919 until 1926; her paintings also appeared in exhibitions at the Pennsylvania Academy of Fine Arts, the Maryland Institute, the American Watercolor Society, the National Art Club, and the National Association of Women Painters and Sculptors, as well as in the Greater Washington Independent Exhibition of 1935. In 1928 she received an award from the National Art Club. In 1930, she received one from the National Association of Women Painters and Sculptors. Riley traveled widely during her career, finding inspiration in the American Southwest and Mexico, the source for the subject matter of some of her few surviving works. Riley died in Washington, D.C., and is buried in Glenwood Cemetery there with other members of her family. One of her paintings, Rainy Day, Guatemala, was formerly in the collection of the Corcoran Gallery of Art.
