= Lola Sleeth Miller =

American painter

- Born: Lola McDonald; October 24, 1860; Memphis, Missouri
- Died: April 24, 1951 (aged 90); Laguna Beach, California
- Known for: Painting, Sculpture

Lola McDonald Sleeth Miller (October 24, 1860 – April 24, 1951) was an American painter and sculptor.

There is much confusion surrounding Miller's early life. According to the information on her Daughters of the American Revolution application form, she was born Lola McDonald in Memphis, Missouri, to farmer Sterling Lynn McDonald and his wife Electa Summerlin; a birthplace of either Edina, Missouri or Croton, Iowa has also been posited, as has a birthyear of 1864 or 1866. She married Francis Sleeth, and from 1892 to 1899 was resident in San Francisco, where she studied with Douglas Tilden at the Mark Hopkins Art Institute. In Paris she studied with James Abbott McNeill Whistler and at the Académie Julian, and in New York City with Frederick MacMonnies and Emil Carlsen. She began working as an art teacher at the National Cathedral School in Washington, D.C. in 1901, remaining there for over thirty years. During her time in Washington she belonged to a number of local arts organizations; she exhibited with the Society of Washington Artists for the first time in 1910, and was a charter member of the Arts Club of Washington and a member of the Washington Water Color Club. Sometime in the 1920s she first visited Laguna Beach, California, and after marrying inventor T. Spencer Miller in 1931 moved there permanently, living there until her death. At the time of her second marriage she was described as a "widow"; her second husband's name is sometimes given as Thomas. A scholarship was endowed in her honor after her death.

Miller was active in a variety of formats during her career, producing landscapes, portraits, and still lifes in oil and watercolor as well as carving portrait busts in marble. Her most notable work is a bust of Martha Washington currently owned by the Daughters of the American Revolution and frequently displayed at Constitution Hall; it was used as the basis for a likeness of Washington on a 1938 postage stamp. Another work was formerly in the collection of the Corcoran Gallery of Art. She is also represented in the collection of the Cathedral Foundation in Washington. Due to her residency in the state later in life she is sometimes classed with other California artists.
