= Bertha E. Perrie =

American painter

- Born: June 20, 1868; Washington, D.C., US
- Died: September 16, 1921 (aged 53); Gloucester, Massachusetts, US
- Known for: Painting

Bertha Eversfield Perrie (June 20, 1868 – September 16, 1921) was an American painter. She has been described as "about the only famous Washington artist who was actually born in D.C."

== Biography ==
Born in Washington, D.C., Perrie was interested in art from an early age, winning a scholarship to the Art Students League of New York. After completing her time there she returned to Washington, where she would become a major figure in local artistic circles. Late in the 1880s she took a position as a teacher at the Art Students League of Washington, where she was also a student, and to whose governing board she would be elected. She taught watercolor at the Corcoran School of Art for over 20 years, and was also on the faculty at the Gunston Hall School. As a painter she was best known for her work in watercolor, though she also produced oil paintings and etchings; she favored landscapes and seascapes, but she painted in other genres as well. Perrie was among the founders of the Arts Club of Washington, and was also a charter member of both the Society of Washington Artists and the Washington Water Color Club, in whose shows she appeared from 1891 until 1921. She also served on the board, and as an officer, in each organization. She also belonged to the Washington Society of Fine Arts and the Washington Handicraft guild, and showed work at Corcoran exhibitions both regionally and nationally; other venues at which she exhibited included the National Academy of Design, the Pennsylvania Academy of the Fine Arts and the New York Watercolor Club. Perrie exhibited her work at the Palace of Fine Arts at the 1893 World's Columbian Exposition in Chicago, Illinois.

Among the awards which Perrie received during her career were the first and second Corcoran prizes at the Washington Water Color Club's 1904 and 1900 exhibitions and a silver medal in the Appalachian Exposition of 1910. In the summer of 1921 she traveled to Gloucester, Massachusetts to spend the season, dying there during her visit.

She was honored with a memorial exhibition at the Corcoran Gallery of Art. Among Perrie's pupils was Susan Brown Chase. Stylistically, Perrie's work encompasses aspects of both Impressionism and realism. Three of her pieces, an etching of William S. McPherson and two paintings, a watercolor of flowers and an oil on canvas of a harbor scene in Gloucester, are owned by the Smithsonian American Art Museum. She is also represented in the collection of the Arts Club of Washington. Many of her other works have remained in private hands.

== Gallery ==
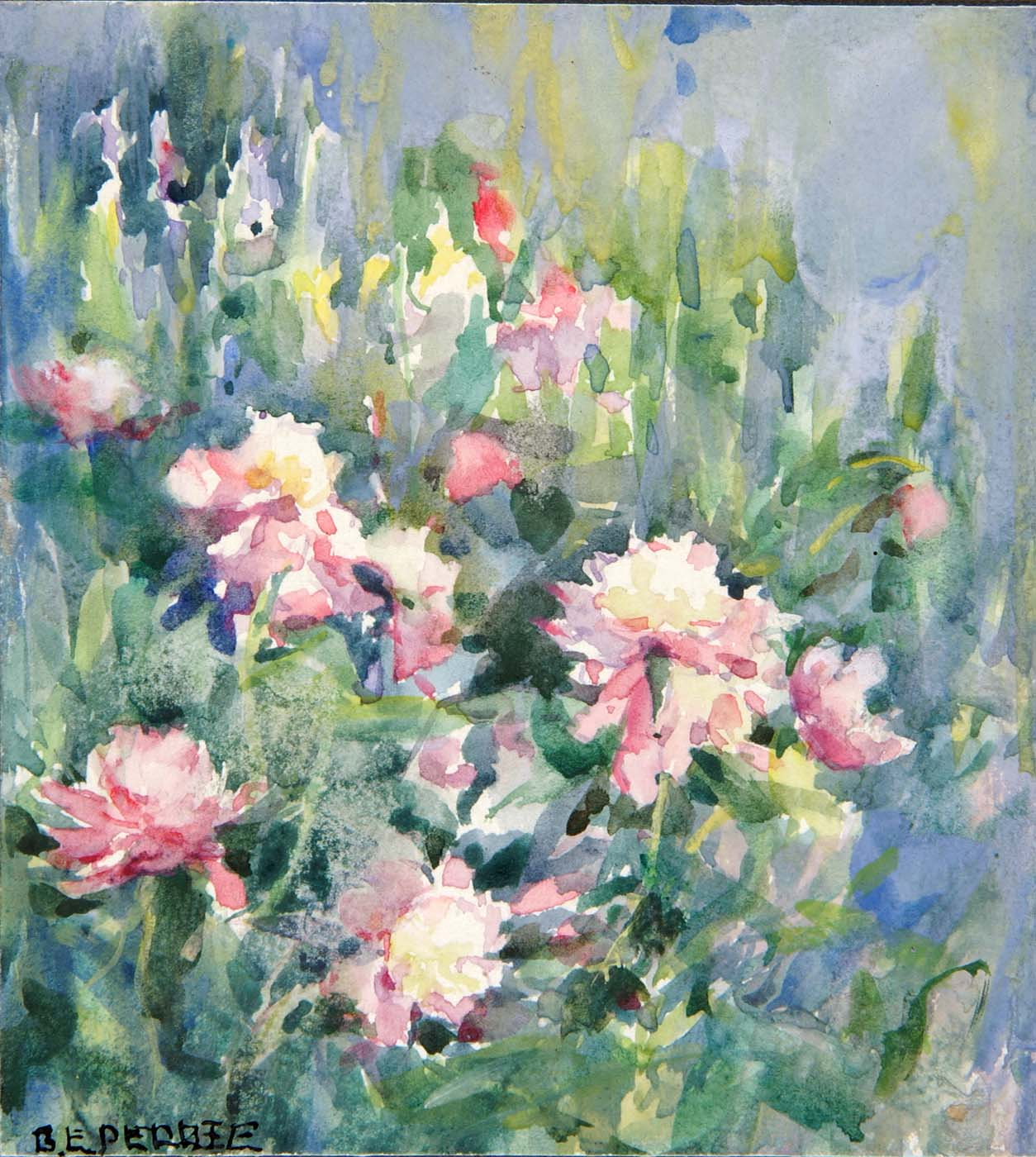
Untitled (Flowers), 1916

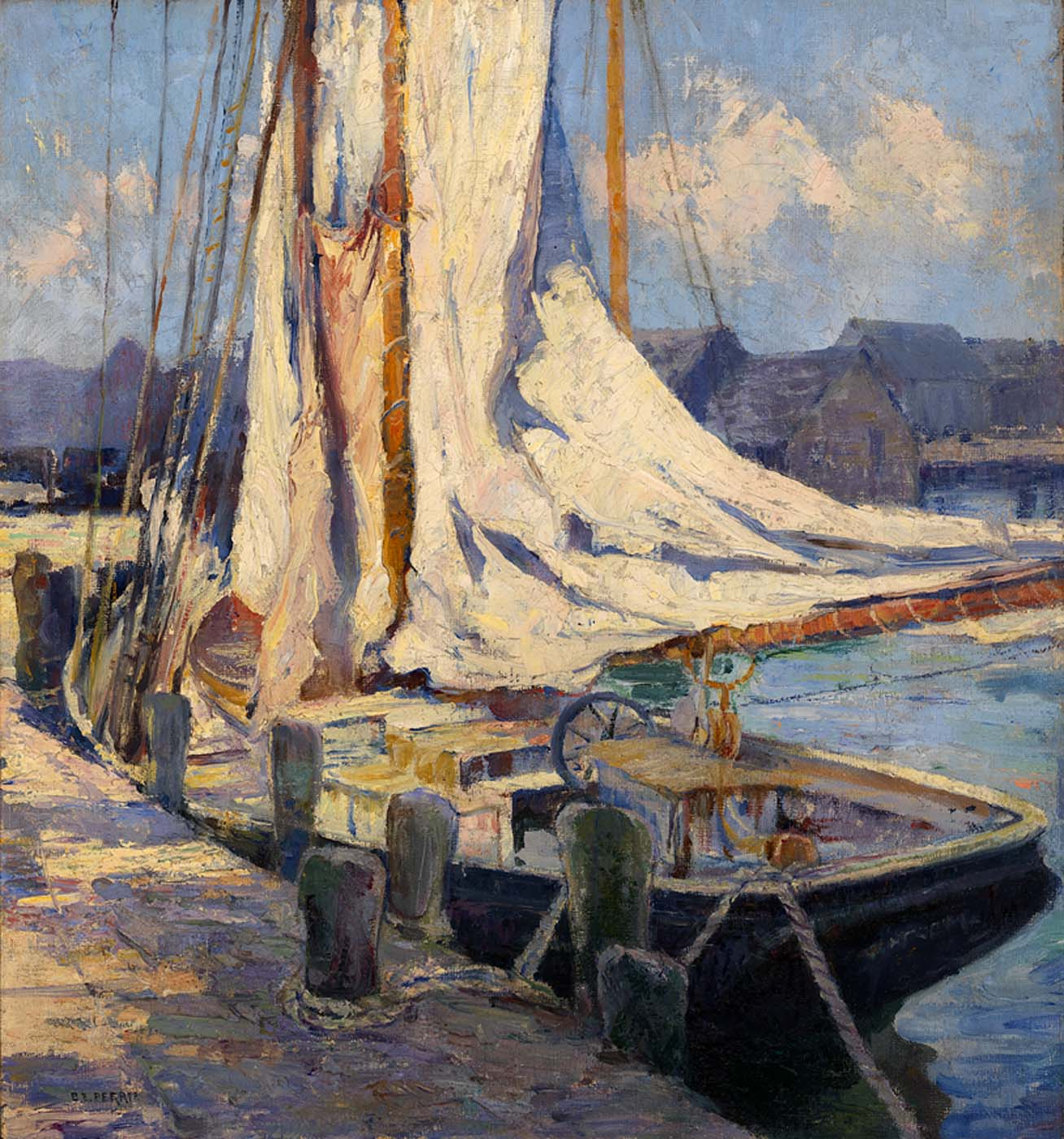
Wharf Scene, Gloucester, n.d.

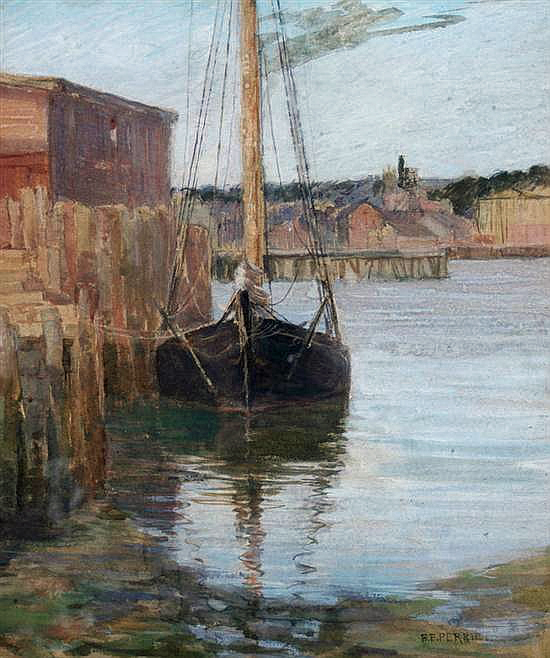
Gloucester Wharf, n.d.
