= Susan Brown Chase =

American watercolorist (1868(?)–1948)

- Born: Susan Brown; 1868; St. Louis, Missouri, US
- Died: 1948 (aged 79–80); Clearwater, Florida, US
- Known for: Painting
- Spouse: Volney Ogle Chase

Susan Brown Chase (1868–1948) was an American painter.

== Biography ==
Born in St. Louis, Chase had moved to Washington, D.C. by 1890, and would spend the majority of her life in that town. She studied art under Edmund C. Messer, Bertha E. Perrie, William Henry Holmes, Henry B. Snell, William Lester Stevens, and George Pearse Ennis, and attended classes at the Chester Springs Summer School. Long active in the arts community in Washington, she was a charter member of the Arts Club of Washington; other organizations to which she belonged included the Washington Water Color Club, the Society of Washington Artists, the American Watercolor Society, and the National Association of Women Painters and Sculptors. With these groups she exhibited at such venues as the Corcoran Gallery of Art, the Art Institute of Chicago, and the Witte Museum. She was one of a small number of women allowed to show work with the Landscape Club of Washington, and she participated in the Greater Washington Independent Exhibition of 1935. For a number of years she taught at the Abbott School of Fine and Commercial Art. Chase received an honorable mention for her work at the Women's National Exhibition in St. Louis, and in 1917 she was awarded a medal from the Washington Water Color Club, on whose board she served and whose president she once was. Later in life she went to live with a daughter in Clearwater, Florida, in which town she died. She was buried at Arlington National Cemetery next to her husband, Volney Ogle Chase, with whom she had had two children; the grave marker gives her date of birth as 1864.

== Work ==
Chase produced mainly watercolors during her career, many of them depicting scenes from around Washington, D.C. She also worked in gouache. One of her watercolors, an Interior from c. 1933–1943, is currently owned by the Smithsonian American Art Museum, to which it was transferred by the General Services Administration from the Internal Revenue Service. Eleven works, mostly watercolors and drawings, are held by the Library of Congress.

== Gallery ==
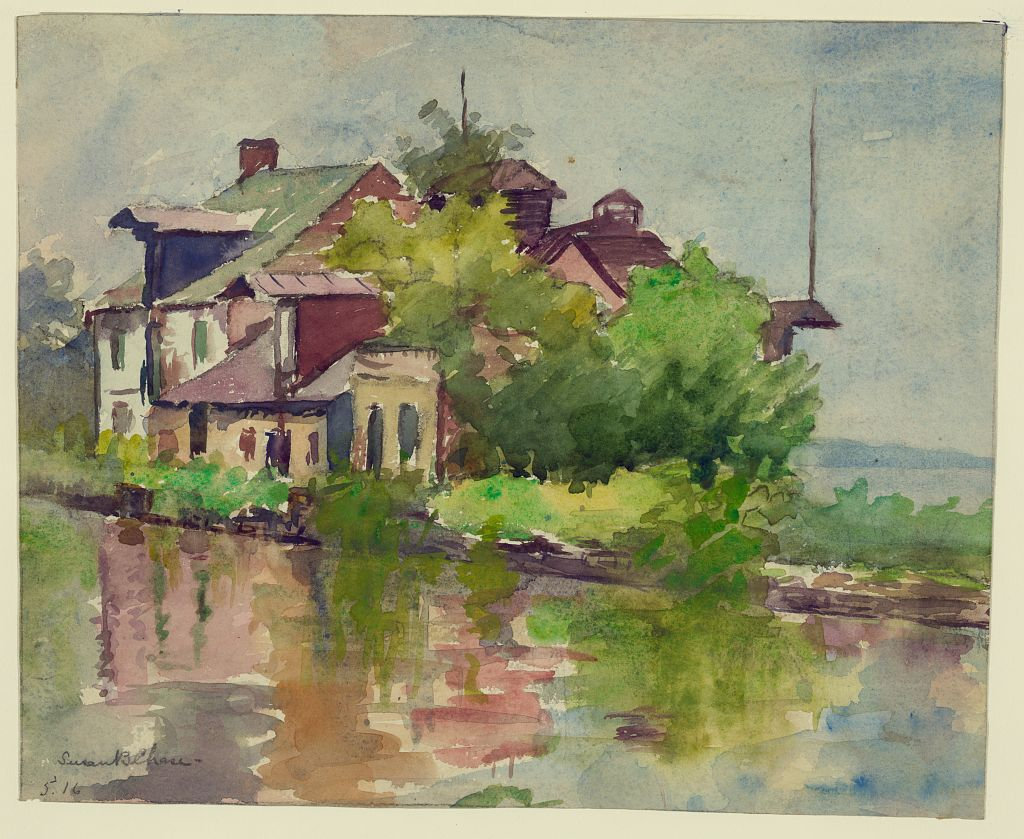
C&O Canal, Georgetown DC, 1916

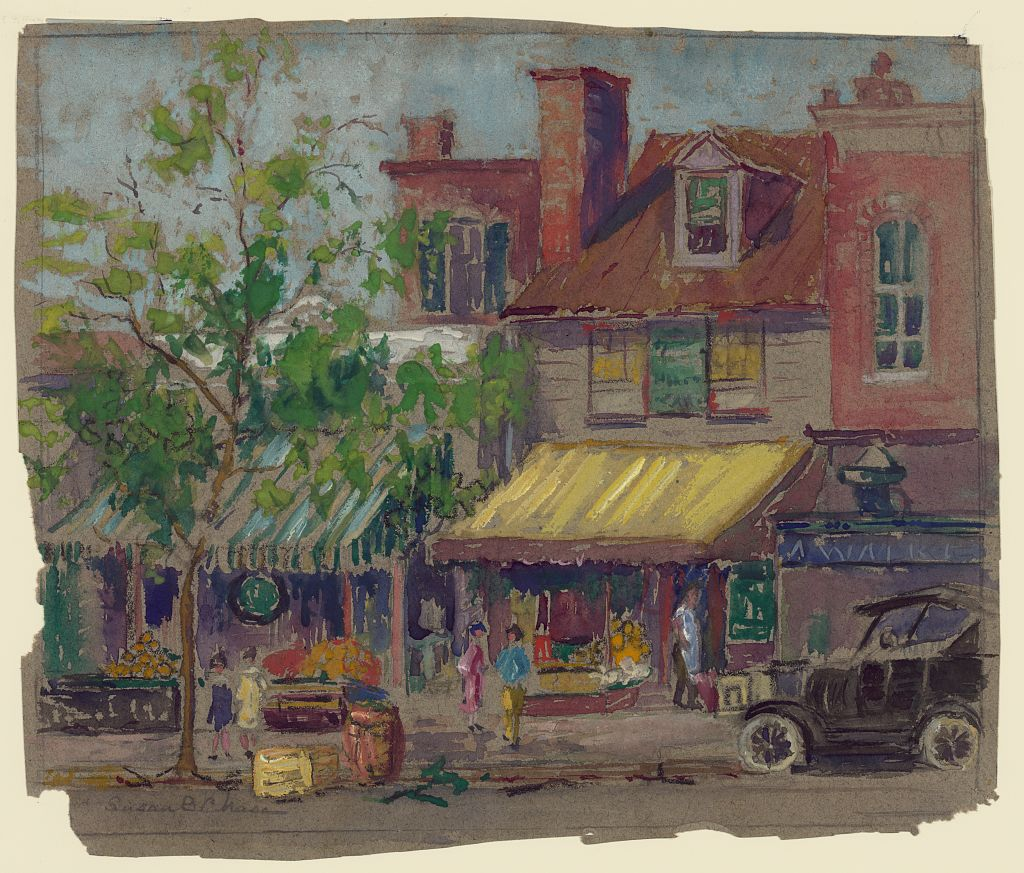
Pennsylvania Avenue between 22 and 23rd Street Washington DC, 1920

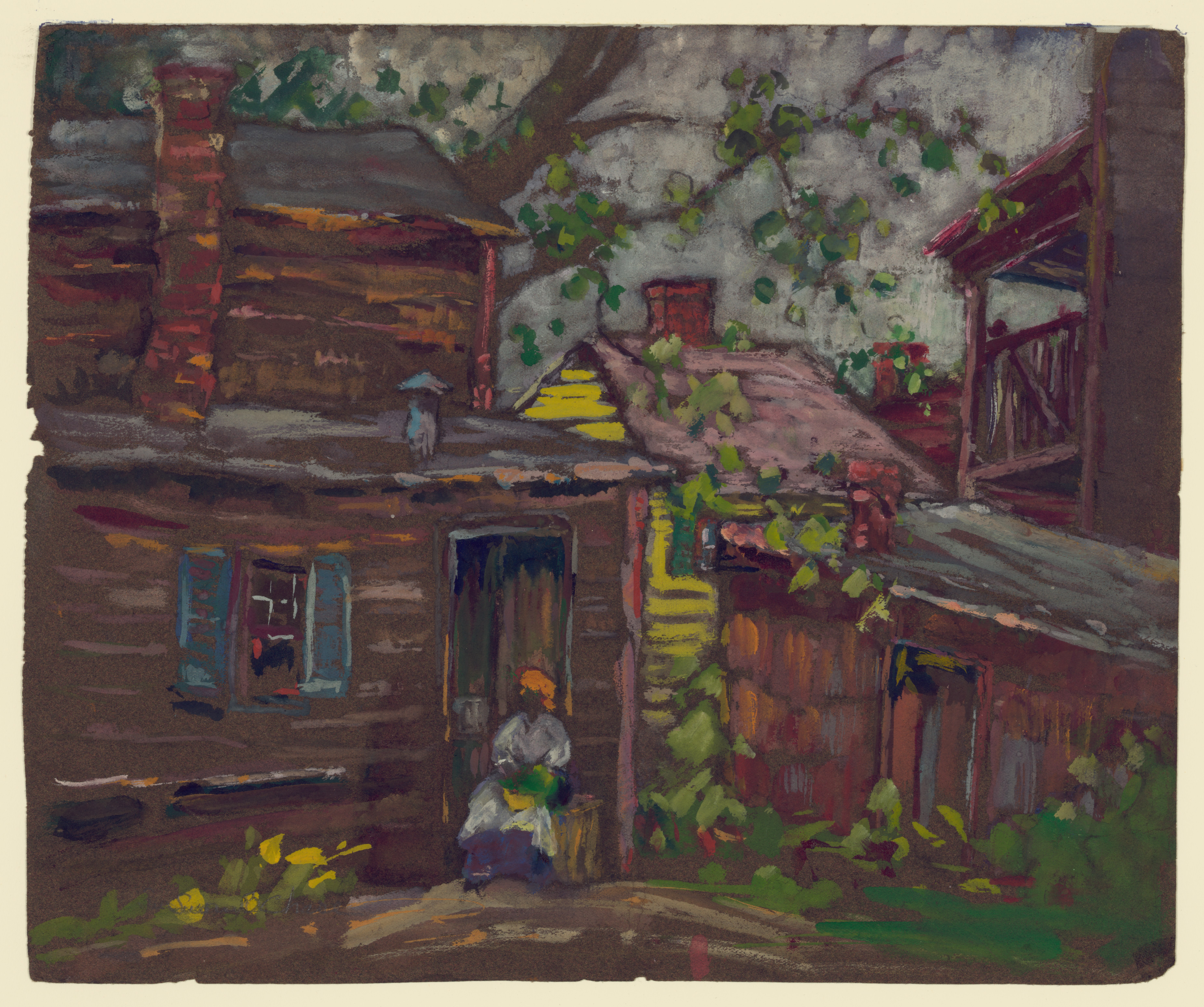
African American sitting in the doorway of a frame house in Washington DC, 1910
