= Rachel Corbett =

Rachel Corbett may refer to:

- Rachel Corbett (art journalist), American author and journalist
- Rachel Corbett (radio presenter), Australian journalist
