= Mathilde Mueden Leisenring =

American painter

- Born: Mathilde Mueden; 1870; Washington, D.C.
- Died: 1949 (aged 78–79); Washington, D.C.
- Known for: Painting
- Spouse: Luther Morris Leisenring

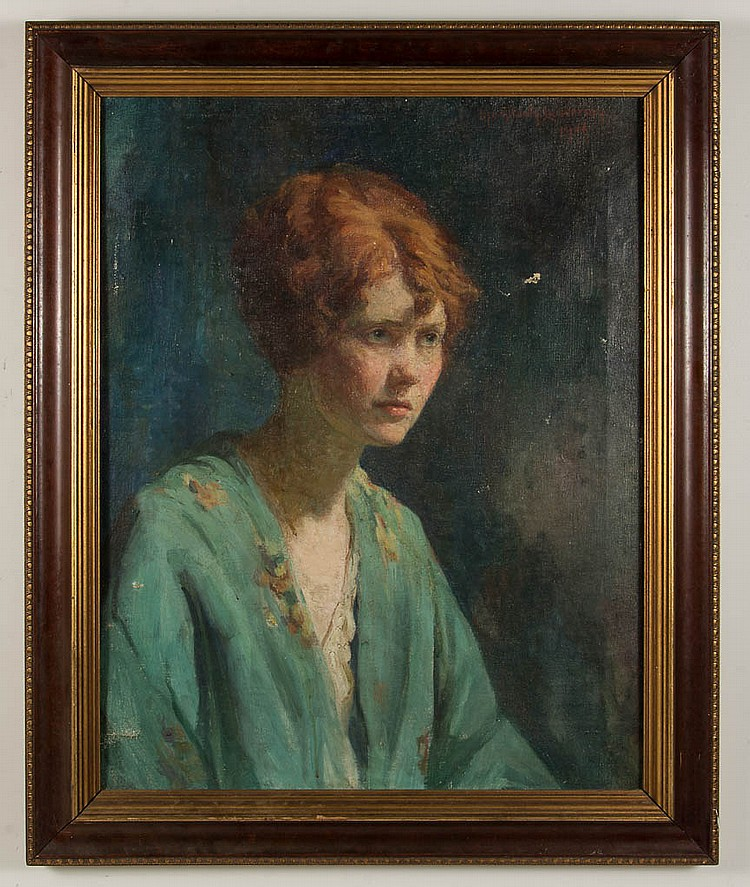
Portrait of a Woman, oil on canvas

Mathilde Mueden Leisenring (1870–1949) was an American painter, mainly of portraits.

Born in Washington, D.C., Leisenring studied at the Art Students League of Washington and the Art Students League of New York. From 1897 to 1899 she studied in Paris; at the Académie Julian her instructors included Jean-Joseph Benjamin-Constant, Jean-Paul Laurens, and Jean-Jacques Henner. Prior to her return to the United States she showed work at the Paris Salon. In Washington she taught from 1902 until 1940 at the Corcoran School of Art. She married architect and photographer Luther Morris Leisenring around 1908. She died in Washington, D.C. Leisenring was a founding member of both the Arts Club of Washington and the Washington Water Color Club, and she was a member of the Society of Washington Artists as well. She won a number of prizes during her career, largely from Washington organizations.

Leisenring's nephew donated a collection of close to a hundred of her works, including paintings and drawings, to the Arts Club of Washington in 2008. They served as the basis for an exhibition at the Club in 2011. Her portrait of Robert Morris, after an original by Charles Willson Peale, is owned by the United States Department of the Treasury.
