= Bertha Noyes =

American painter

- Born: 1876
- Died: 1966 (aged 90–91)
- Resting place: Rock Creek Cemetery; Washington, D.C., U.S.
- Education: Corcoran School of the Arts and Design, The George Washington University
- Known for: Painting

Bertha Noyes (1876–1966) was an American painter.

A native of Washington, D.C., Noyes studied at the Corcoran School of Art in that city; she also had lessons with Charles Webster Hawthorne. She exhibited widely, and her work is held in numerous public and private collections. Among organizations to which she belonged were the American Federation of Arts, the Washington Society of Artists, the Washington Watercolor Club, the Boston Art Club, the Provincetown Art Association, the National Association of Women Painters and Sculptors, and the Newport Art Association. She often traveled to Central and South America, as well as to the Southwestern United States, and frequently depicted scenes from her travels in her work.

Noyes lived at 610 21st Street NW for many years; it was there, in 1916, that she founded the Arts Club of Washington. She was long involved with the organization, heading the committee that ultimately relocated it to its current location on I St., NW. In 1936 she commissioned an armillary sphere from C. Paul Jennewein, after an initial design by Paul Manship, to be erected in Meridian Hill Park as a memorial to her father Isaac and sister Edith; it is currently missing. She is buried at Rock Creek Cemetery in Washington, D.C.
