= Helen Louise Beccard Niles =

American painter and printmaker (1903–1994)

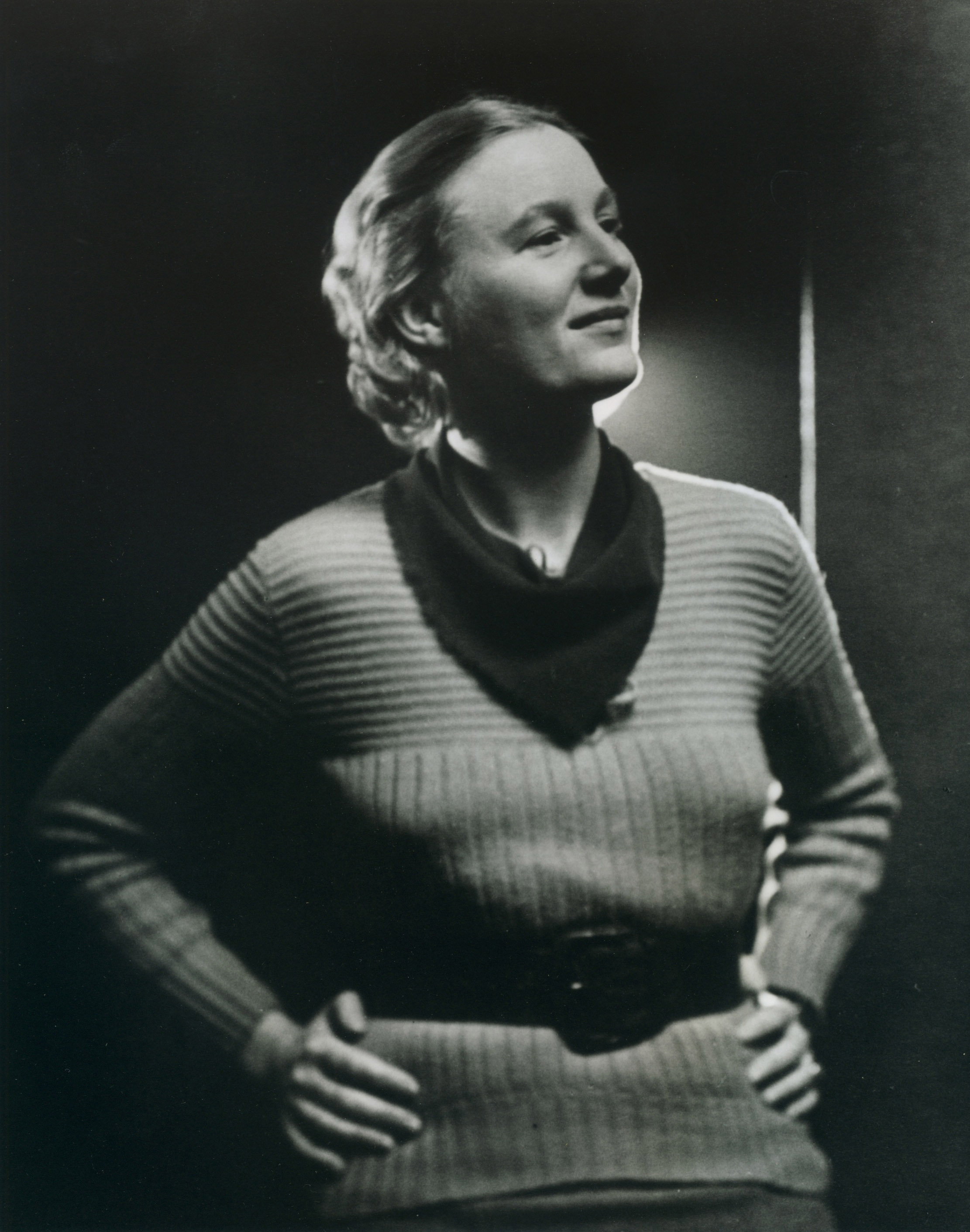
- Helen Louise Beccard Niles in1936
- Born: November 12, 1903; St. Louis, Missouri
- Died: May 14, 1994 (aged 90); San Francisco, California
- Education: St. Louis School of Fine Arts

Helen Louise Beccard Niles (November 12, 1903 – May 14, 1994) was an American painter and printmaker. Her work was exhibited at the 1939 New York World’s Fair, the Corcoran Gallery of Art, and regional galleries in St. Louis, Washington, D.C., and California. She received prizes from numerous art associations with which she was associated including the Oakland Art Association, and her prints and paintings entered public collections, including the Crystal Bridges Museum of American Art and the Baltimore Museum of Art. She produced works ranging from realist depictions of working-class life to later explorations of abstraction, color, and form.

== Early life and education ==
Beccard was born in St. Louis, Missouri, on November 12, 1903, the eldest child of Lena Obermark Beccard (1879–1967) and John Frederic Beccard, Jr. (1878–1966). She studied at the St. Louis School of Fine Arts between 1921 and 1924, and subsequently taught art for fifteen years at Mary Institute, a private academy affiliated with Washington University in St. Louis.

During the 1930s, Beccard maintained a studio in St. Louis and joined the St. Louis Artists' Guild and later the American Artists Congress. She financed annual summer travels to destinations including New Orleans, Mexico, Europe, Colorado, and New England. While in Mexico she studied fresco painting, and in Colorado she produced lithographs printed at the Colorado Springs Fine Arts Center. Sketches from her travels informed her paintings, many of which depicted African American subjects, street scenes in St. Louis, and Mississippi River riverboat scenes.

== Later career ==
In 1939, Beccard accepted a teaching position at the Calhoun School, a progressive academy in Manhattan. That same year her oil painting Sleeping Fireman was exhibited at the New York World’s Fair.

She lived initially in Greenwich Village and began signing her works “Helen Beccard Niles” after her 1942 marriage to Walter W. Niles (1908–1996), a naval officer during World War II. Her New York–period drawings and paintings often represented working-class street culture, including docks, factories, fairs, and immigrant neighborhoods.

After the war and the birth of their two children, the Niles family relocated to Washington, D.C., where Walter was employed by the RAND Corporation. During this period, Helen resumed painting and exhibited with the Society of Washington Artists, showing at the Corcoran Gallery of Art and other regional venues. Her style shifted from naturalism to more abstract forms.

In 1956, the family moved to the San Francisco Peninsula, where Helen took up printmaking and exhibited regularly at Gallery House in Palo Alto. She and Walter later lived in San Francisco and Oakland before settling on Russian Hill, where she continued to work until her death.

During the 1960s, 1970s, and 1980s her work was exhibited at shows sponsored by the Richmond Art Center, the Oakland Art Association, and San Francisco Women Artists and often received awards and prizes, including the Janet Langmaid prize of the Oakland Art Association in 1984.

== Legacy ==
Most of Helen’s works are owned either by surviving members of her family or by individuals who purchased them over the years. Two of her 1937 Colorado lithographs, WPA Workers at Monument Creek and Ice and Coal Factory, are owned by the Crystal Bridges Museum of American Art. A floral painting from the 1950s was the recipient of a purchase prize by the Baltimore Museum of Art. Select works on paper from the 1920s and 1930s were purchased by the owner of Aaron Galleries, Chicago, and have been offered for sale through that gallery's web site and printed catalogues. While in her twenties and thirties, she drew on her pictorial skills to illustrate publications aimed at a juvenile audience, including booklets of sheet music for the piano. She died of lymphoma in San Francisco on May 14, 1994, at the age of 90.
