= Michael Sragow =

American film critic and columnist

- Born: June 26, 1952 (age 74); New York City, United States
- Education: Harvard University; New York University
- Occupations: Writer, film critic, columnist

Michael Sragow (born June 26, 1952) is an American film critic and columnist who has written for The Orange County Register, The Baltimore Sun, Film Comment, the San Francisco Examiner, The New Times, The New Yorker (where he worked with Pauline Kael), The Atlantic and Salon.com. Sragow also edited James Agee's film essays (for the book Agee on Film), and has written or contributed to several other cinema-related books.

== Career ==
Sragow attended New York University and Harvard University, where he majored in history and literature. Sragow began his career at the magazine Boston, and went on to become the film critic for Rolling Stone. From 1985 to 1992, he was the lead film critic for the San Francisco Examiner. Commencing in 1999, he was a film critic for Salon.com, and commencing in 2001, he was a film critic for The Baltimore Sun. In March 2013 he became the first film critic in a decade for The Orange County Register in California.

In 2008, Sragow published a biography of director Victor Fleming. In his review, John Gallagher writes that Sragow's biography "restores the director to his rightful place in film history and popular culture. It's a fantastic read, assiduously researched, using primary archival resources and a full complement of remembrances from Fleming's family and colleagues." Jeanine Basinger wrote, "Steven Spielberg said about Fleming, 'We honor his movies and don't know him, because he did his job so well.' Thanks to Michael Sragow, we now know Victor Fleming." Sragow's book won the 2008 Marfield Prize, which is a national award for arts writing.

In January 2010, Sragow taught a course on "Classic American Films" at Centre College for the school's three-week "Centre Term." Sragow has constantly supported British filmmaker David Yates through his online blog "Sragow Gets Reel", naming him "a big-screen master of tension, atmosphere and emotional suggestion".

== Books ==
- Sragow, Michael, ed. (1990). Produced and Abandoned: The Best Films You've Never Seen. National Society of Film Critics. ISBN 0-916515-84-2.
- Sragow, Michael, ed. (2005). James Agee: Film Writing and Selected Journalism. Library of America. ISBN 978-1-931082-82-2.
- Sragow, Michael, ed. (2005). James Agee: Let Us Now Praise Famous Men, A Death in the Family, Shorter Fiction. Library of America. ISBN 978-1-931082-81-5.
- Sragow, Michael (2008). Victor Fleming: An American Movie Master. Pantheon. ISBN 978-0-375-40748-2.
