= Sue May Gill =

American painter

- Self-portrait in red and gold. circa 1930
- Born: January 12, 1887; Sabinal, Texas
- Died: January 14, 1989 (aged 102); Topton, Pennsylvania
- Known for: Painting
- Spouses: Orville D. Wescott (m. 1908–1928) Paul Ludwig Gill (m. 1928)

Sue May Gailey Wescott Gill was an American artist and member of the Philadelphia Ten.

== Life ==
Sue May Gill was born on January 12, 1887, in Sabinal, Texas. The second child of Asa Jones Gailey and Sue Louise Connally, she studied at the Chicago Art Institute, the Pennsylvania Academy of the Fine Arts and the Academie Colarossi in Paris. Gill married Orville D. Wescott, a physician residing in Denver, Colorado in 1908, and had a daughter in 1915. She and Wescott divorced in 1928, and she later married Paul L. Gill, with whom she lived in Harvey Cedars, New Jersey.

Gill had a one-woman show at the Art Club of Philadelphia in 1930. In 1931 she joined the Philadelphia Ten group and served as its chairman from 1934 through 1935.

Gill died on January 14, 1989, in Topton, Pennsylvania.
