= Paul L. Gill =

American painter

Paul Ludwig Gill (1894 - 1938) was an American watercolor painter and teacher. His work includes a government funded mural in Cairo, Georgia. Shortly after the commission he died at age 44. The Brooklyn Museum of Art held a memorial exhibition of his work along with that of George Pearse Ennis who died in 1936.

Gill died of a heart attack in Harvey Cedars, New Jersey, where he and his wife, portraitist Sue May Gill, owned a cottage that was their longtime summer home. He grew up in Auburn, New York and graduated from Syracuse University. He also studied at the Pennsylvania Academy of the Fine Arts where he won two Cresson scholarships for European study and travel.

From 1924 he was an instructor at the Moore Institute of Art and in the summer at Syracuse University. He won the Sesquicentennial Exposition Silver medal, the Baltimore Water Color Club and Chicago Art Institute prizes in 1926, the Philadelphia Water Color Club and the New York Water Color Club prizes in 1927. His work included depictions of the Maine coast, Gaspe peninsula, Mexico and Atlantic City.

Two of his paintings are in the collection of the Metropolitan Museum of Art.
