= George Pearse Ennis =

American watercolor and stained glass artist (1884–1936)

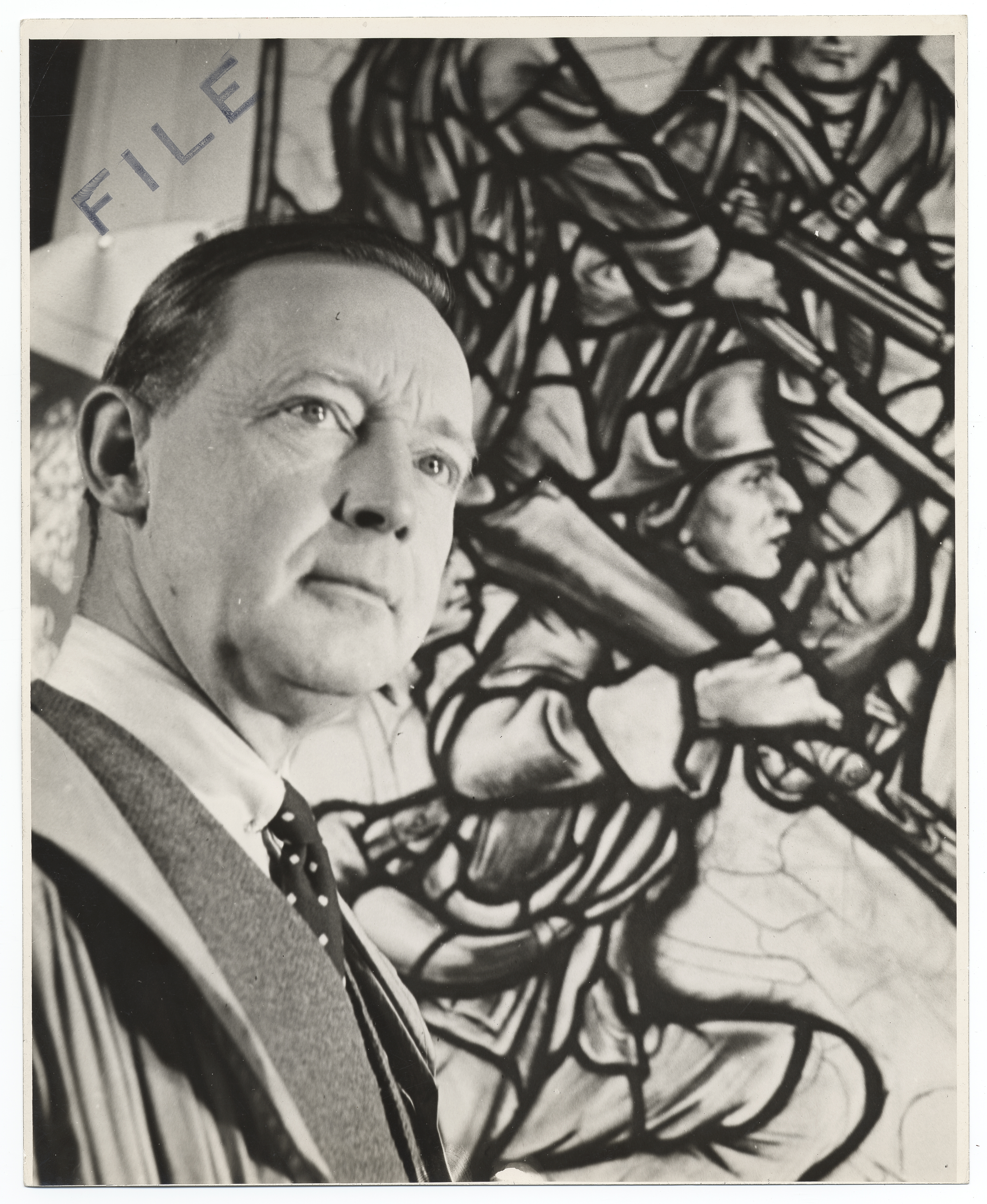
- George Pearse Ennis, from the Archives of American Art
- Born: July 21, 1884; St. Louis, Missouri, U.S.
- Died: August 1936 (aged 52); Utica, New York, U.S.
- Education: Washington University in St. Louis, The Chase School
- Known for: Painting, watercolor, murals, stained glass

George Pearse Ennis (July 21, 1884 – August 1936) was an American artist. He is known for his watercolors and for the stained glass window he designed for Washington Hall, the cadet mess hall at West Point.

== Life ==
Ennis studied at Washington University in St. Louis and at the Chase School. He was a member of the Federal Art Project. He worked in New York City, and, after the 1920s, in Eastport, Maine. Ennis died following an automobile crash near Utica, New York in 1936.

His work is held by the Art Institute of Chicago.

Ennis also taught; among his pupils was Susan Brown Chase and Earl Bailly.

== Works ==
- Ennis, George Pearse (1943) [1933]. Making a water-colour. How to do it Series. London: Studio Publications. OCLC 560101379.
- Summers, Charles, George Pearse Ennis (1903). The nomads : a socio-economic novel. St. Louis, Mo.: Cosmos Pub. Co. OCLC 12529582.

== See also ==
- Paul L. Gill
