= Wendy Mae Chambers =

American composer (born 1953)

Wendy Mae Chambers (born January 24, 1953) is an American composer, currently living in Harvey Cedars, New Jersey. Chambers studied at Barnard College from 1971 to 1975, where she received her B.A. in music, and where she studied with Kenneth Cooper, Nicholas Roussakis, Jack Beeson and Charles Wuorinen. She earned her M.A. in composition at Stony Brook University in New York, where she studied between 1975 and 1977.

Her large-scale music events were inspired by the work of Christo and Andy Warhol, and the desire to reach an audience beyond traditional new music audiences. In addition, she knew John Cage well and her work 12 squared for twelve percussionists (1994) is a voodoo tone poem written in his memory. By staging works outside the concert halls and into the public sphere, she has succeeded in bringing her music outside the domain of specialists and academics.

Chambers is also well known for her work writing for and performing with the toy piano. In 1994, The New York Times commented, "Ms. Chambers is not only a composer, but also possibly the world's foremost virtuoso on the toy piano."

== Works ==
=== Large-scale works and events ===
(instrumentation, place, and year of premier)

- REAL MUSIC – for 9 cars (1978)
- STREET MUSIC – for 30 musicians and coordinated radio broadcast based on the theme from “Cose *Encounters” (1978)
- THE KITCHEN – for 9 performers on pots and pans and 3 performers preparing food (1978)
- MUSIC FOR CHOREOGRAPHED ROWBOATS for 24 musicians in rowboats Central Park, NYC (1979)
- BUSY BOX QUARTET – for 4 crib toys (1980)
- CLEAN SWEEP – for 9 vacuum cleaners (1980)
- PRIME TIME – for 9 televisions (1980)
- THE VILLAGE GREEN – for 3 marching bands, town siren, and guns (1980)
- ONE WORLD OF PERCUSSION – for 50 percussionists and solo Tibetan horn (1981)
- TEN GRAND – for 10 grand pianos Lincoln Center Fountain Plaza, NYC (1983)
- THE GRAND HARP EVENT – PLUCK for 30 harps Cathedral of St. John the Divine (1984)
- SOLAR DIPTYCH – for 30 trumpets (1985)
- MARIMBA – for 26 marimbas (1985)
- LIBERTY OVERTURE New York Harbor, NYC (1986)
- QUILL – for 6 harpsichords and surround sound tapes of bird calls (1987)
- SYMPHONY OF THE UNIVERSE – Cathedral of St. John the Divine, NYC (1989)
- A MASS FOR TROMBONES – requiem for 77 trombones Cathedral of St. John the Divine, NYC (1993)
- TWELVE SQUARED – for 12 percussionists (1994)
- NIGHT OF THE SHOOTING STARS – for 16 percussionists (2005)
- ORBIT – for 16 percussionists, click track and 2 conductors (2008)
- KUN – for 64 toy pianos Vizcaya Museum and Gardens, Miami, Fl(2009)

=== Chamber works, small ensemble pieces, and solo instrument works ===
- POPCORN – for percussion quartet (1977)
- MINIATURES – for piano 4 hands (1983)
- SUITE FOR TOY PIANO (1983)
- SET FOR PERCUSSION QUARTET (1985)
- z-1 MOMENTS – for solo harp (1985)
- MEDITATION AND AIR – for flute and harp (1992)
- SERENADE – for trumpet and vibraphone (1992)
- OCEANIC VARIATIONS – for piano solo (1992)
- ECLIPSE – for solo violin (1994)
- SOLARSONICS – for solo viola (1994)
- BLUES for solo violoncello (1996)
- RAZZMATAZZ – for solo contrabass with time portals (1996)
- PSALMS OF THE BUTTERFLY – for violin and viola (1996)
- MANDALA – for toy piano (1997)
- MANDALA – for solo clarinet (1997)
- MANDALA IN FUNK – for percussion quartet (1997)
- ENDANGERED SPECIES SONG CYCLE – for mezzo-soprano, harp & percussion (1997)
- ANTARCTICA SUITE – for solo piano (1999)
- SONGS FOR ENDANGERED SPECIES for percussion, harp and baritone – parts 2 – (1999, 2000)
- SONGS FOR VOODOO ON THE BAYOU (2006)

=== Commissions ===
- MARIMBA! (26 marimbas) – Kennedy Center, Washington DC (1986); Percussive Arts Society
- SOLAR DIPTYCH (30 trumpets) – Central Park, NYC (1985); New Wilderness Foundation
- MANDALA IN FUNK (percussion quartet) – American Composers Forum and J.B. Smith and the Arizona State University Percussion Department
