= Rachel Corbett (art journalist) =

American author and journalist

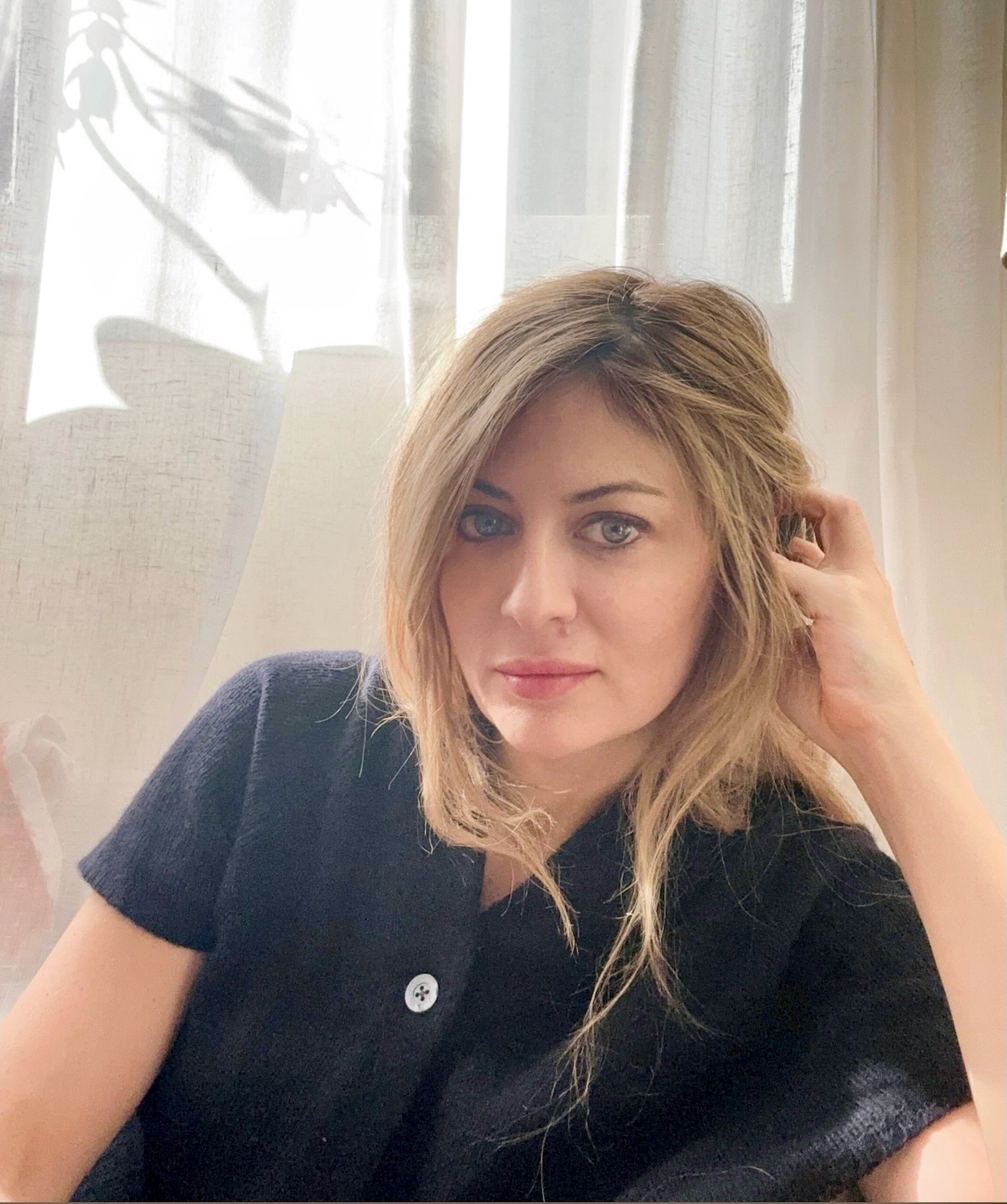
- Rachel Corbett, 2025
- Born: Iowa, U.S.
- Education: Columbia University; University of Iowa
- Occupation: Journalist
- Writing career
- Genre: Non-fiction
- Notable awards: Marfield Prize

Rachel Corbett is an American author and journalist. She is the author of the books You Must Change Your Life: The Story of Rainer Maria Rilke and Auguste Rodin, published by W.W. Norton in 2016 and The Monsters We Make, published by W.W. Norton in 2025. She has been a features writer at New York magazine since 2025. She was the executive editor of Modern Painters from 2016-2017. Prior to that she worked as a correspondent for The Art Newspaper.

== Life ==
Corbett grew up in Iowa and studied at the Columbia University Graduate School of Journalism and the University of Iowa. Her 2016 book, You Must Change Your Life: The Story of Rainer Maria Rilke and Auguste Rodin, won the Marfield Prize.

== Selected works ==
=== Books ===
- Corbett, Rachel (2016). You Must Change Your Life: The Story of Rainer Maria Rilke and Auguste Rodin. New York: W. W. Norton.
- Corbett, Rachel (2025). The Monsters We Make: Murder, Obsession, and the Rise of Criminal Profiling. New York: W. W. Norton.

=== Essays and reporting ===
- Corbett, Rachel (July 3, 2017). "Gottschee question". The Talk of the Town. Dept. of Dirndls. The New Yorker. Vol. 93, no. 19. pp. 20–21.
- Corbett, Rachel (October 18, 2018). "The Culture Wars of Car Racing." The New York Times Magazine.
- Corbett, Rachel (October, 2019). "Medicaid's Dark Secret:" For many participants, the program that provides health care to millions of low-income Americans isn’t free. It’s a loan. And the government expects to be repaid. The Atlantic.
- Corbett, Rachel (August 23, 2023). "The Inheritance Case That Could Unravel an Art Dynasty: " How a widow’s legal fight against the Wildenstein family of France has threatened their storied collection — and revealed the underbelly of the global art market. The New York Times Magazine.
- Corbett, Rachel (October 30, 2025). "The Truth About IFS, the Therapy That Can Break You". The Cut. New York Magazine.
