= Cleveland Abbe House =

Historic house in Washington, D.C., United States

- Arts Club of Washington
- U.S. National Register of Historic Places
- U.S. National Historic Landmark
- D.C. Inventory of Historic Sites
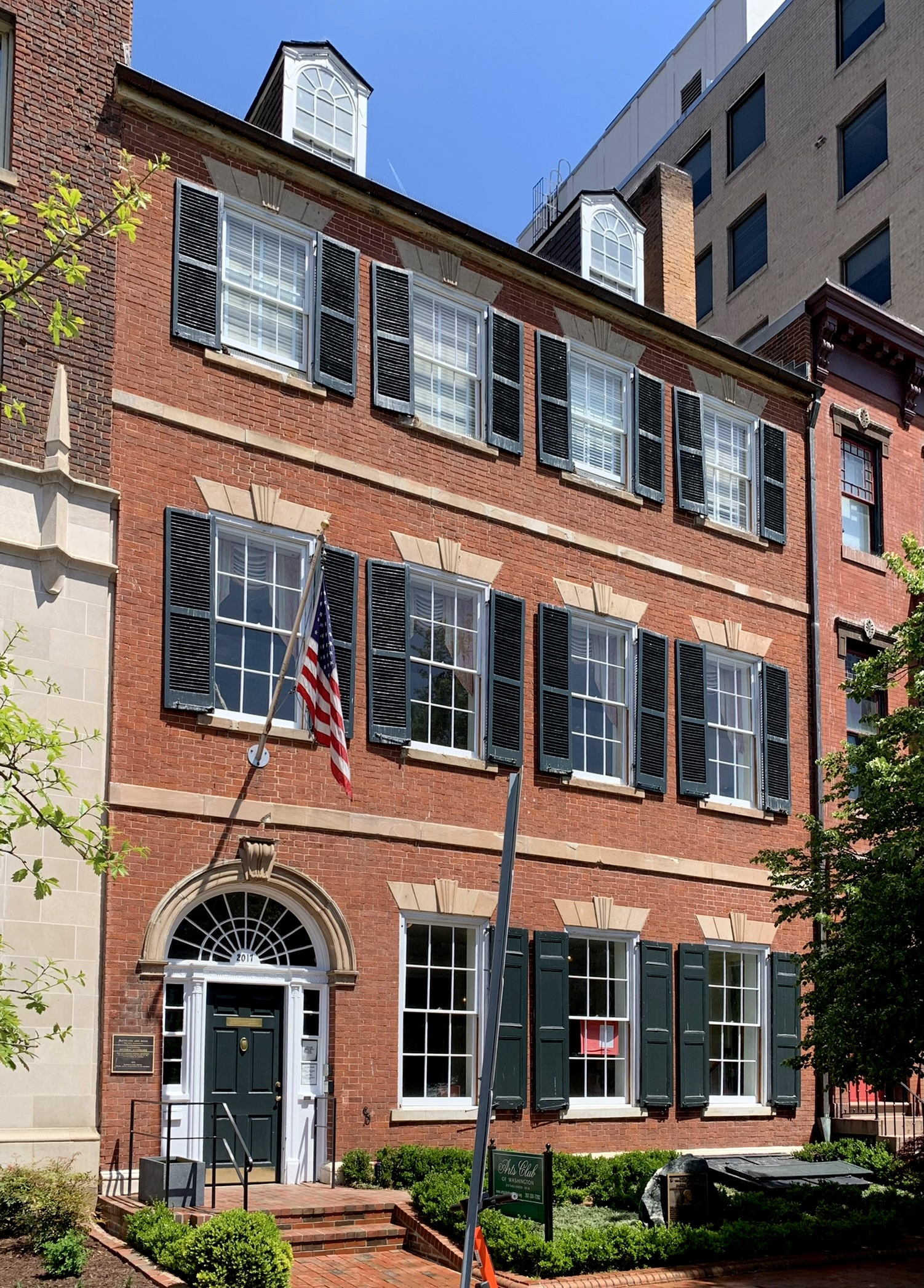
- Cleveland Abbe House in 2022

- Location within Central Washington, D.C.
- Location: 2017 I Street, NW, Washington, D.C.
- Coordinates: 38°54′5.3″N 77°2′44.55″W
- Built: 1802
- Architect: Timothy Caldwell
- Architectural style: Federal
- NRHP reference No.: 69000289

Significant dates
- Added to NRHP: March 24, 1969
- Designated NHL: May 15, 1975
- Designated DCIHS: November 8, 1964

The Cleveland Abbe House, also known as the Timothy Caldwell House and Monroe-Adams-Abbe House, is a historic house at 2017 "I" Street NW in Washington, D.C. Built in 1805, it is an excellent example of Federal period architecture. It has had a series of distinguished residents. Most notable are James Monroe, who occupied it as United States Secretary of War and as President of the United States while the White House was restored after the War of 1812, and historian Henry Adams. However, it was designated a National Historic Landmark in 1975 for its association with meteorologist Cleveland Abbe (1838–1916), the founder of the National Weather Service, who lived here from 1877 until his death. It is now home to the Arts Club of Washington.

== Description and history ==
The Cleveland Abbe House stands on the George Washington University campus northwest of the White House, on the north side of "I" Street across from James Monroe Park and near its junction with Pennsylvania Avenue. It is a three-story brick row house built out of red brick and topped by a dormered gable roof. It is four bays wide, with the entrance in the leftmost bay. Windows are rectangular sash, with stone sills and splayed keystone lintels. A stone string course separates each of the floors from the next. The main entrance has an elaborate Federal surround, with sidelight windows and a large half-round transom window. The interior of the house retains its original Federal period finishes.

== History ==
Timothy Caldwell built the house around 1802 to 1805. James Monroe lived there from 1811 to 1817, a period during which he was Secretary of State and War Secretary. From his inauguration as America's fifth President in March 1817 until the White House was fully restored in September 1817, the Cleveland Abbe House served as the Presidential residence. In the 1820s, the house was occupied by the British legation. Henry Adams lived here with his parents, Charles Francis Adams Sr. and Abigail Brooks, from 1860 to 1861.

Cleveland Abbe, founder of the U.S. Weather Bureau, lived here from 1877 to 1909. It was during his ownership that a number of alterations were made to the house. He raised it from 2 1/2 to 3 1/2 stories, demolished some of its outbuildings, and built additional rooms in the rear. After Abbe died in 1916, the Arts Club of Washington purchased the building.

The house was listed on the National Register of Historic Places as "Arts Club of Washington" in 1969. It was declared a National Historic Landmark as "Cleveland Abbe House" in 1975.

== See also ==
- List of National Historic Landmarks in Washington, D.C.
- National Register of Historic Places listings in central Washington, D.C.
