= Arts Club of Washington =

U.S. nonprofit organization

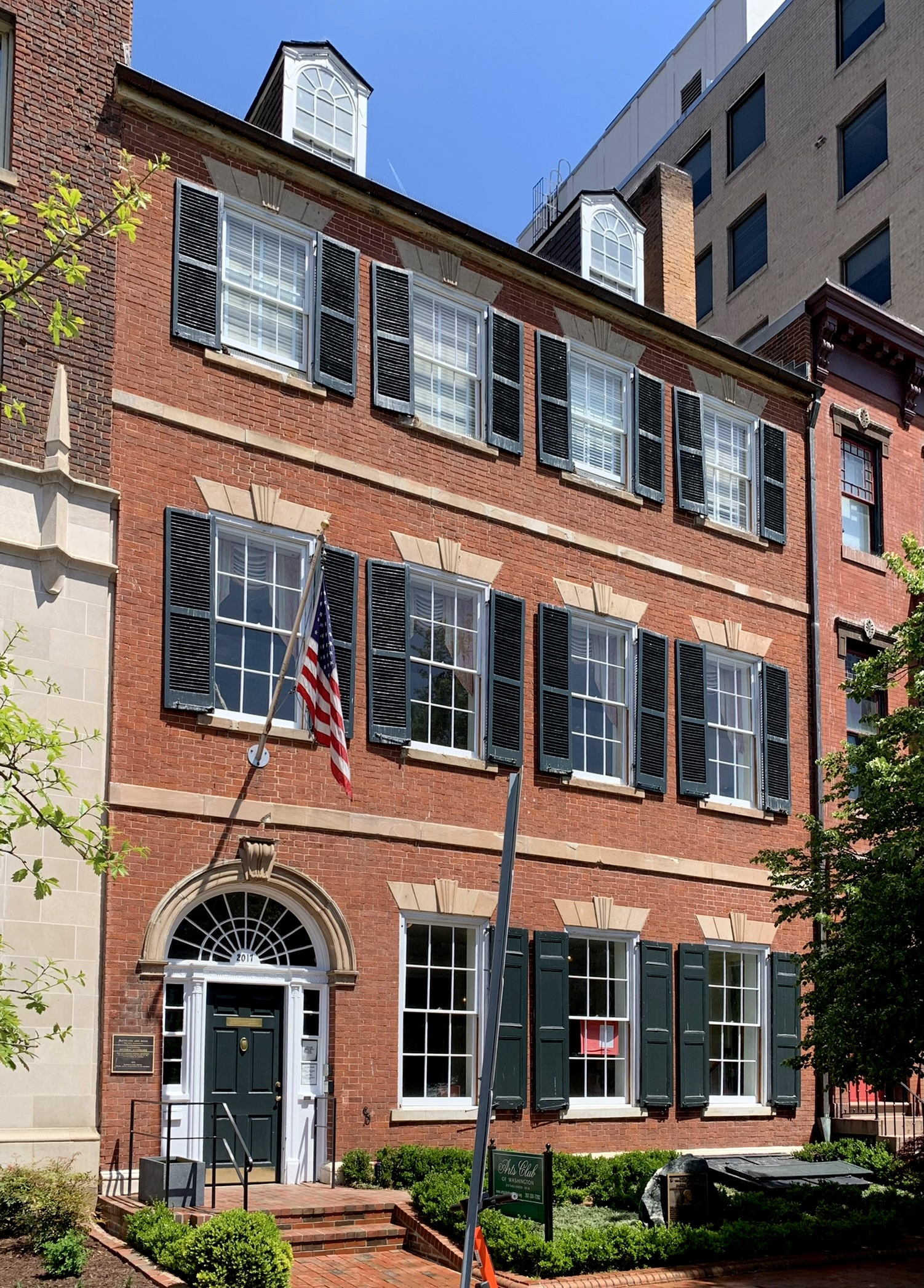
- Cleveland Abbe House in 2022

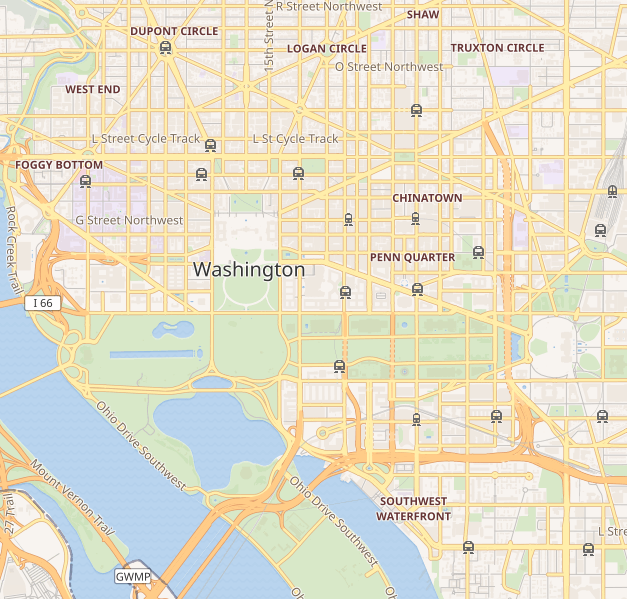
- Formation: May 1916
- Founder: Bertha Noyes
- Coordinates: 38°54′5.3″N 77°2′44.55″W
- Website: artsclubofwashington.org

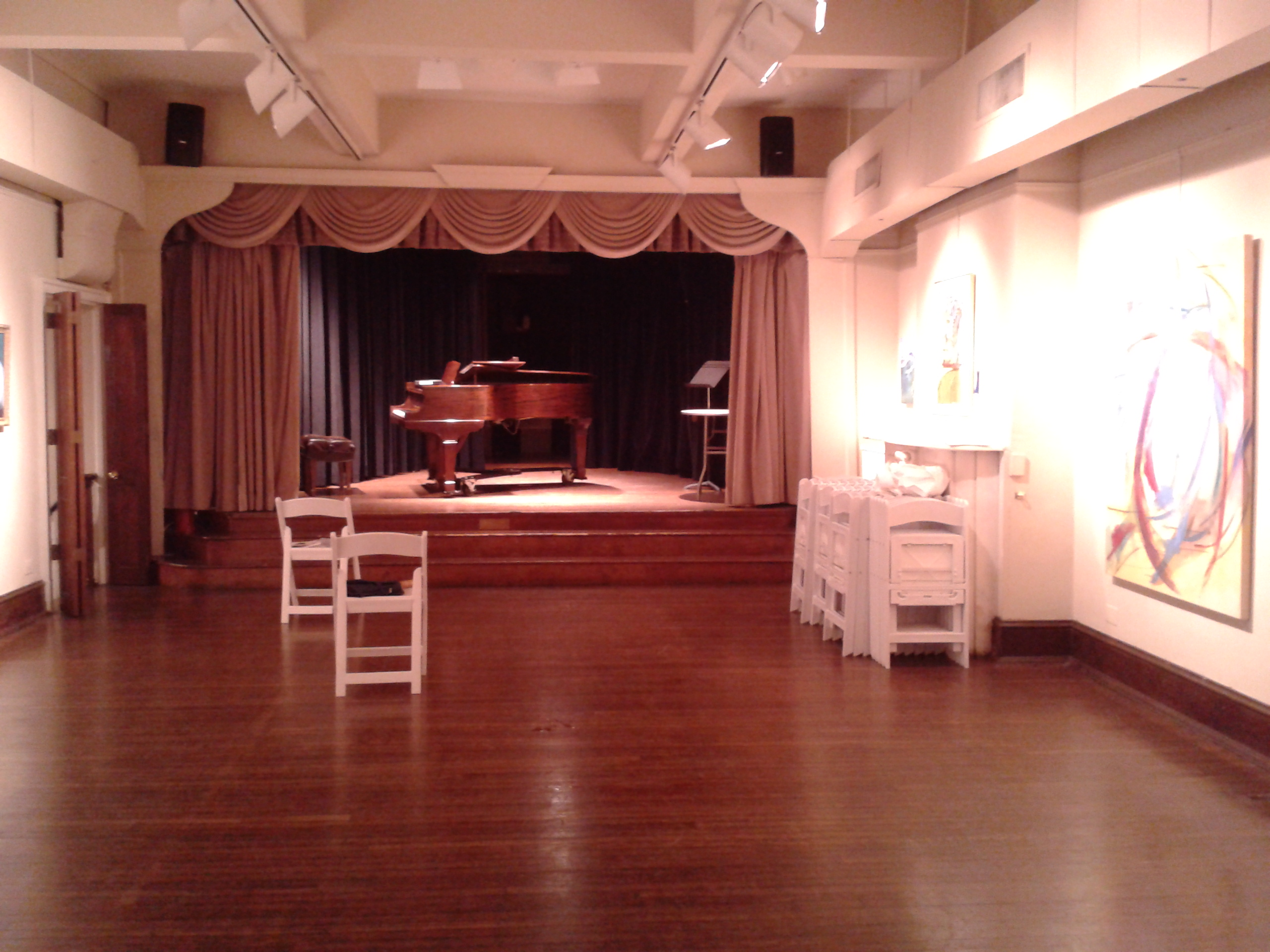
Theater at the Arts Club, after a recital

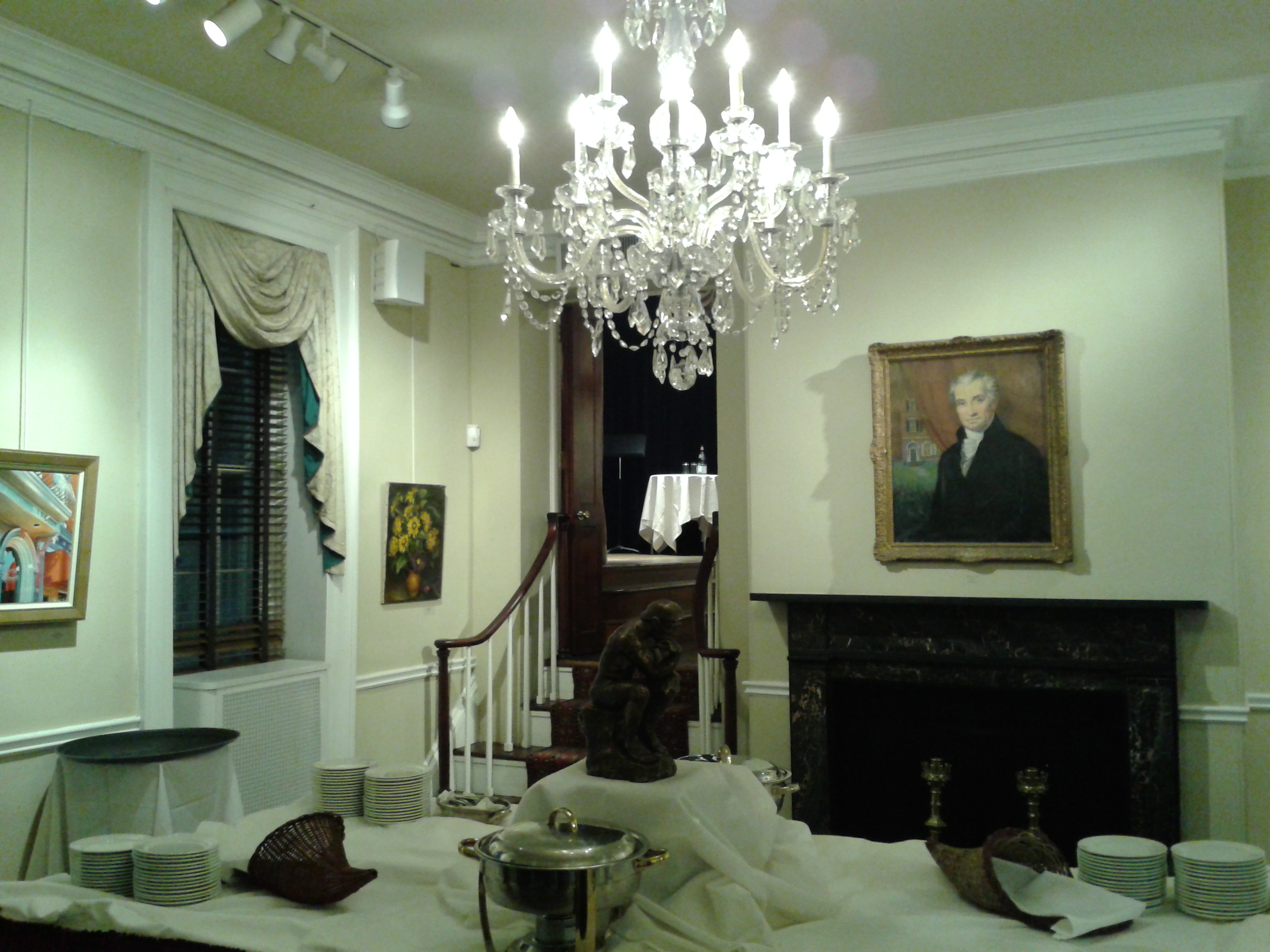
Interior of the club before a reception. On the wall is a portrait of James Monroe, who lived at the Cleveland Abbe House at the start of his presidency.

The Arts Club of Washington is a private club to promote the Arts in Washington, D.C.

Founded by Bertha Noyes in May 1916, its first president was Henry Kirke Bush-Brown; Mathilde Mueden Leisenring was among its original members, as were Susan Brown Chase, Catharine Carter Critcher, Lola Sleeth Miller, Bertha E. Perrie, and Mary Gine Riley.

It is located at the Cleveland Abbe House. Since 2006, the club has awarded the Marfield Prize, also known as the National Award for Arts Writing, for nonfiction books about the arts written for a broad audience.

== Programs ==
The club supports visual, performing, and literary arts in Washington, D.C. It hosts a noon-time concert series. It awards arts scholarships.

== The Marfield Prize, National Award for Arts Writing ==
The Marfield Prize, also known as the National Award for Arts Writing, is given annually by the Arts Club of Washington to nonfiction books about the arts written for a broad audience. Intended to help increase access to the arts, the Prize "celebrates prose that is lucid, luminous, clear, and inspiring—writing that creates a strong connection with arts and artists."

The Prize of $10,000, which the Club asserts is the only one of its kind in the country, honors nonfiction books first published in the U.S., by a single author who is living at the time of the book's nomination. First given in 2006, the prize's endowment was established by long-time Arts Club member Jeannie S. Marfield in honor of Florence Berryman and Helen Wharton.

The award is given to the author of a nonfiction book about any artistic discipline (visual, literary, performing, or media arts, as well as cross-disciplinary works. Works of art history and criticism, biographies and memoirs, and essays are all eligible. Anthologies, creative works of fiction or poetry, books for children, exhibition catalogs and self-published books are not eligible.

Members of the club noticed that there was a lack of "good, accessible writing about the arts," according to former award administrator Sarah Browning. Club members decided to use a bequest by longtime member Jeannie S. Marfield to remedy the situation. In addition to the annual winners, the Club publishes the names of several finalists.

== List of winners ==
Year awarded	Winner	Title	Publisher	Published year
2020	Maggie Doherty	The Equivalents: A Story of Art, Female Friendship, and Liberation in the 1960s	Knopf	
2019	Andrew McConnell Stott	What Blest Genius?: The Jubilee That Made Shakespeare	W. W. Norton & Company	
2018	Wendy Lesser	You say to brick: the life of Louis Kahn	Farrar, Straus and Girou	2017
2017	Rachel Corbett	You Must Change Your Life	W. W. Norton	2016
2016	Michael Riedel	Razzle Dazzle: The Battle for Broadway	Simon & Schuster	2015
2015	Philip Gefter	Wagstaff: Before and After Mapplethorpe	Liveright	2014
2014	Sherill Tippins	Inside the Dream Palace: The Life and Times of New York's Legendary Chelsea Hotel	Houghton Mifflin Harcourt	2013
2013	Anne-Marie O'Connor	The Lady in Gold: The Extraordinary Tale of Gustav Klimt's Masterpiece, Portrait of Adele Bloch-Bauer	Knopf	2012
2012	Yael Tamar Lewin	Night's Dancer: The Life of Janet Collins	Wesleyan University Press	2011
2011	R. Tripp Evans	Grant Wood: A Life	Knopf	2010
2010	Linda Gordon	Dorothea Lange: A Life Beyond Limits	W. W. Norton & Co.	2009
2009	Michael Sragow	Victor Fleming: An American Movie Master	Pantheon Books	2008
2008	Brenda Wineapple	White Heat: The Friendship of Emily Dickinson and Thomas Wentworth Higginson	Knopf	2008
2008	Jenny Uglow	Nature's Engraver: A Life of Thomas Bewick	Farrar, Straus & Giroux	2007
2007	Scott Reynolds Nelson	Steel Drivin' Man—John Henry: The Untold Story	Oxford University Press	2006
