= Society of Washington Artists =

Society in Washington, D.C.

- Formation: 1890
- Purpose: To promote the exhibition of its members' art work
- Location: Washington, D.C.

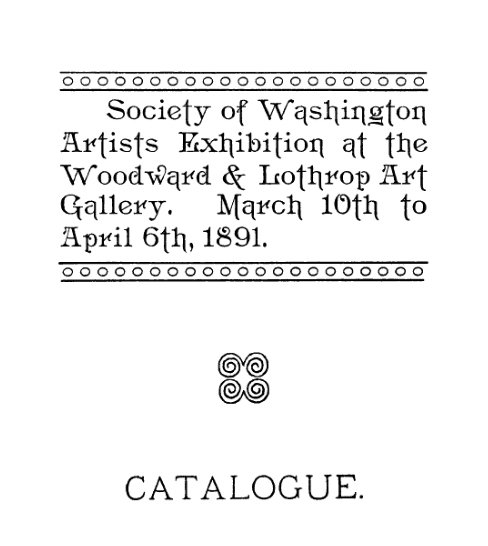
front cover of the Catalog Society of Washington Artists Exhibition, 1891

The Society of Washington Artists was established in 1890 in Washington, D.C. The Society was organized by the Art Students League of Washington.

The Society's first exhibit was in 1891, held at the Woodward & Lothrop building. Within a few years the Society had its own gallery space at 1020 Connecticut Avenue. In that space the Society exhibited loaned art work held in private collections in Washington, D.C. By 1900 the Society's annual exhibits included out-of-town artists and were the forerunners of the Corcoran Gallery's Biennial Exhibition of Contemporary American Art.

Early exhibitors included Alice Pike Barney, Frank Weston Benson, William Merritt Chase, L. Birge Harrison, Childe Hassam, Helen Louise Beccard Niles Hobart Nichols, Edward Willis Redfield, George Senseney, Juliet Thompson, and Irving Ramsey Wiles.

The Society has a collection of art. The majority of the collection was donated in 2015 from the trustees of Corcoran Gallery of Art.
