= The Fairmont Washington, D.C. =

Luxury hotel in Washington, D.C., United States

Fairmont Washington, D.C. Georgetown
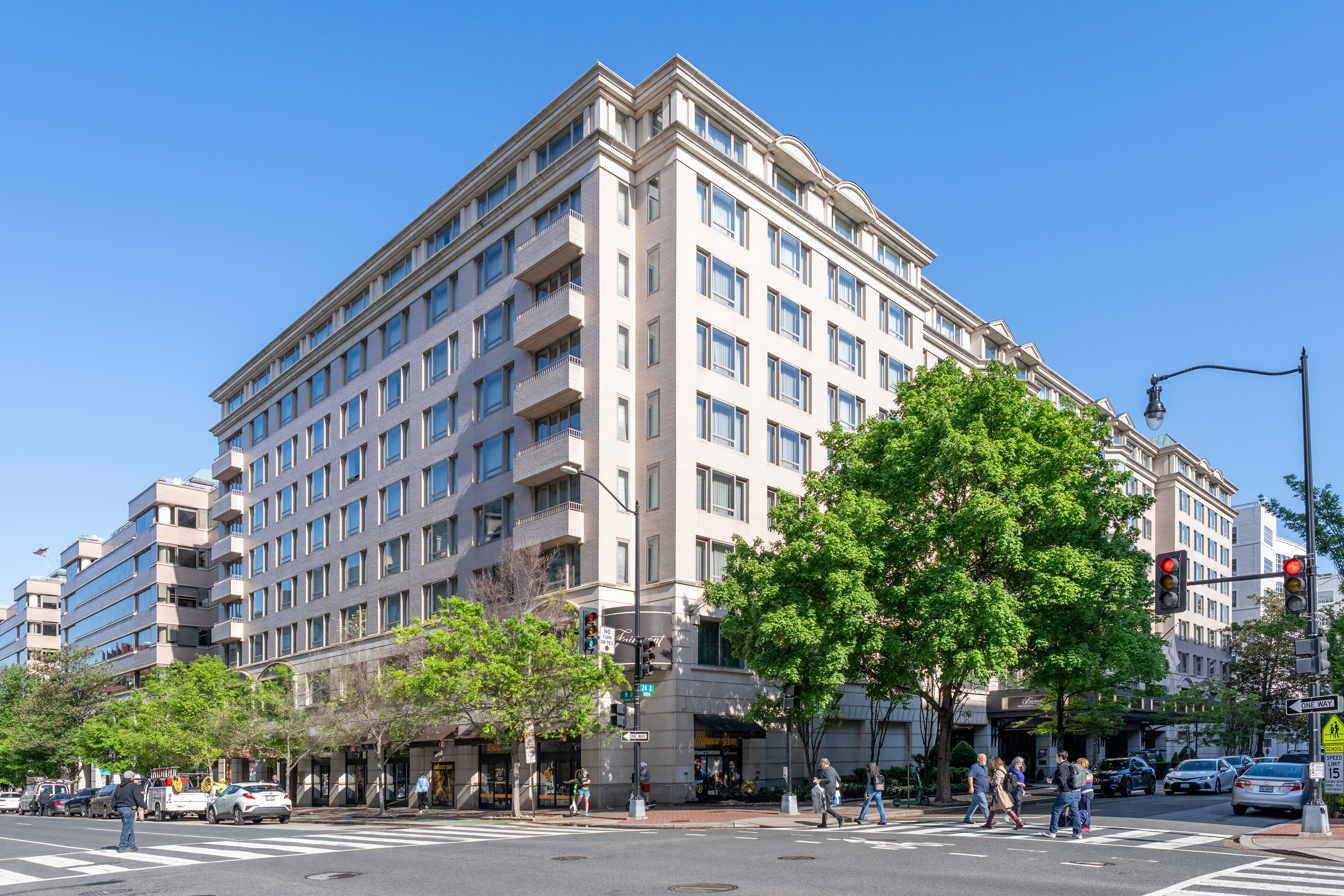

- Location within the District of Columbia

General information
- Location: United States, Washington, D.C.
- Coordinates: 38.9057°N 77.0516°W
- Opening: December 1985 (structure); October 2002 (Fairmont brand)
- Cost: $65 million
- Owner: Cadbridge Investors LLP
- Operator: Fairmont Hotels and Resorts

Height
- Height: 107 feet (33 m)

Technical details
- Floor count: 10 (9 above-ground, 1 below-ground)

Design and construction
- Architect: Vlastimil Koubek
- Developer: Oliver Carr Company and Westin Hotels
- Structural engineer: Emanuel E Necula, PE/PC

Other information
- Number of rooms: 415 rooms (inclusive of suites)<
- Number of suites: 30
- Number of restaurants: 1

Website
- fairmont.com/washington

The Fairmont Washington, D.C. Georgetown is a luxury Postmodernist-style hotel located at 2401 M Street NW in Washington, D.C., in the United States. The structure, in the West End neighborhood of the city, opened in December 1985 as The Westin Hotel. In December 1989, Westin sold the hotel to All Nippon Airways, which operated it as the ANA Hotel. Lowe Enterprises purchased the hotel in October 1998, and renamed it the Washington Monarch Hotel. A $12 million renovation followed in 1999. Lowe Enterprises sold the hotel to Legacy Hotels Real Estate Investment Trust in October 2002, and Legacy contracted with Fairmont Hotels and Resorts to manage the hotel. The hotel was renamed The Fairmont Washington, D.C. Legacy was itself purchased by Cadbridge Investors in July 2007 and the hotel sold to MetLife in 2014, although the property remained branded a Fairmont. A $27 million renovation was completed in January 2017.

The Fairmont Washington, D.C. has a four-diamond rating from the AAA.

== Constructing the hotel ==
=== Construction ===
By the 1960s, Washington, D.C.'s West End neighborhood was a decaying area of Victorian townhouses and abandoned light industrial sites. In 1974, the city significantly revised its zoning regulations. Among the changes, the city treated hotels the same as residential housing, which spurred a hotel construction boom.

In 1983, the Oliver Carr Company, one of the D.C. area's largest real estate development companies, initiated construction on a new hotel on the northwest corner of 24th and M Street NW in Washington, D.C. The development, a 416-room structure estimated to cost $65 million (Note: A single source says the hotel cost $75 million.) was designed by local architect Vlastimil Koubek in collaboration with structural engineer, Emanuel E. Necula PE/PC. Westin Hotels financed the project.

The hotel, built by Clark Construction and its subsidiary George Hyman Construction Co. was well under way by January 1984. The hotel opened in December 1985. Construction of the hotel helped complete a rapid transformation of the neighborhood that began in 1983. For a time, the intersection of 24th and M Streets NW was known as "Hotel Corner", because three new hotels existed here: The Grand Hotel on the southeast corner (originally known as The Regent, finished in October 1984), the Park Hyatt Washington on the northeast corner, and Carr's Westin on the northwest corner.

=== Critical assessment ===
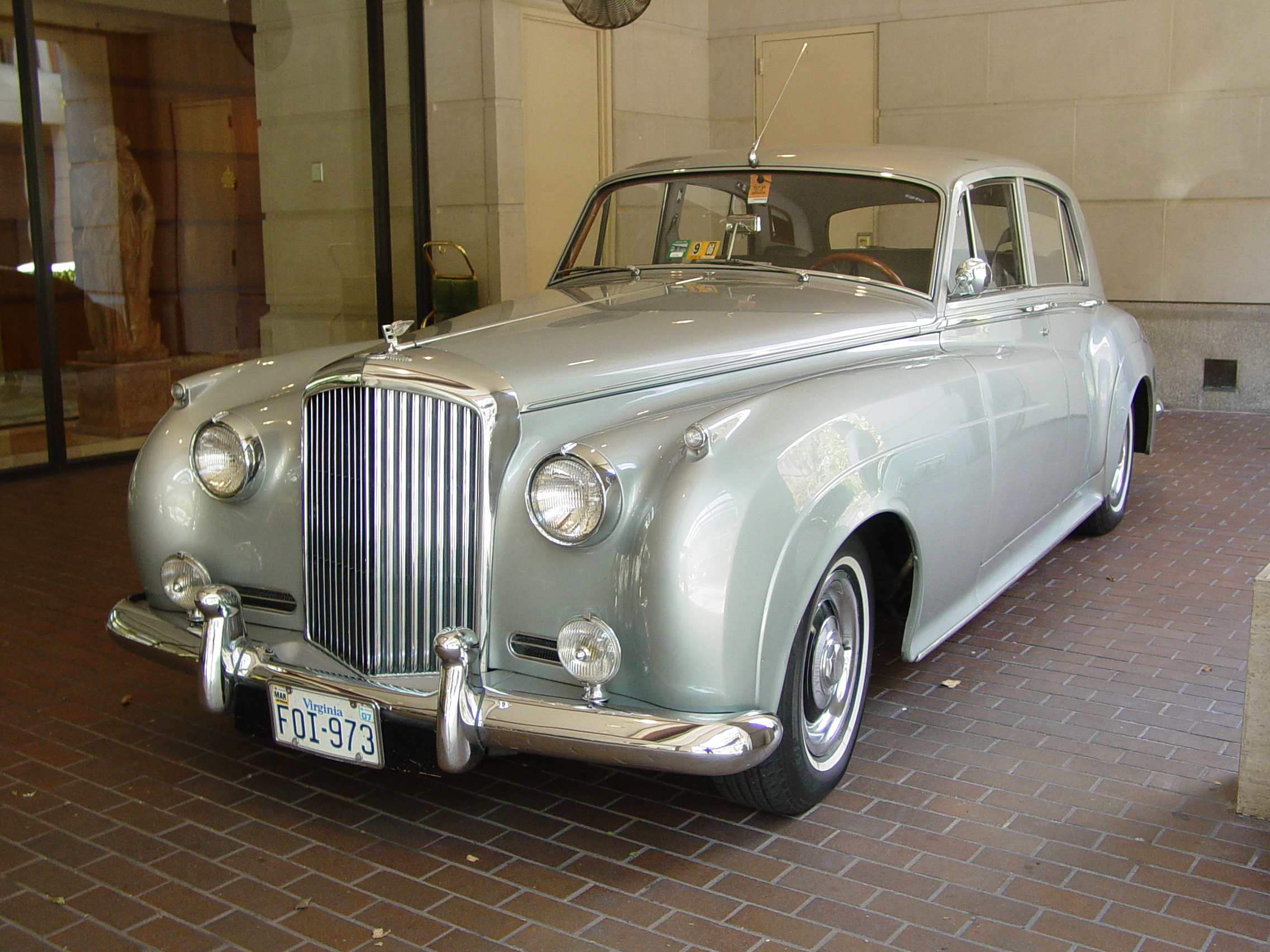
A Bentley S2 at Fairmont Hotel

The 10-story Westin had an exterior facade of glazed brick, granite, and limestone, and a copper covered roof. As required by local zoning regulations, a public space existed at the main entrance. The facade was divided into a base, middle section, and crown, and all the exterior windows featured pediments with slightly projecting bays. The interiors were designed by Sarah Tomerlin Lee. "[We] designed the Westin with the inspiration of modern Washington gardens and its big sky...," she said. The lobby featured a three-tiered Italianate fountain surrounded by a large garden, and a 10-by-15-foot (3.0 by 4.6 m), $40,000 17th-century Flemish. A 185-seat amphitheater occupied the below-ground floor, while the ninth floor was "secure floor"—meaning it could be isolated from the rest of the hotel for the security of diplomatic or high-security guests. The Presidential Suite on the ninth floor featured three bathrooms, a Federalist récamier sofa, a Second Empire carved mahogany stool, portraits of George and Martha Washington, and a collection of antique hand fans. The public spaces of the hotel were decorated with paintings of flowers and First Ladies, and the walls and floor of each guest room were marble. The hotel's below-ground level also featured a swimming pool, fitness center, two squash courts, an aerobics area, a steam room, two massage rooms, two tanning beds, and a special stairway to allow joggers to access the street from the locker rooms without going through the lobby. Meeting space totaled 29,000 square feet (2,700 m^{2}), and the fitness center 17,500 square feet (1,630 m^{2}).

== Hotel history ==
The 416-room Westin competed directly with the 263-room Grand Hotel directly across the street, whose rates were initially about the same as the Westin's. Other important competitors were the Hay–Adams Hotel, the Ritz-Carlton Hotel on Massachusetts Avenue NW, and the Four Seasons Washington. The Westin's primary customer was the business traveler with an expense account and small meetings for corporate or governmental executives, while its secondary customer were convention-goers seeking a more upscale hotel.

On December 29, 1989, Westin sold the hotel to All Nippon Airways for $100 million or $110 million (sources vary). Although the hotel had struggled financially at first, in 1988 and 1989 Westin said the hotel had exceeded company revenue goals and had an occupancy rate higher than average for the D.C. area. Westin agreed to continue managing the hotel, which would be rebranded as the ANA Hotel. In 1996, Westin took over management of The Grand Hotel, rebranding it The Westin Georgetown. In 1988, Marriott International considered buying the ANA Hotel as part of a wider corporate buyout, but no deal was ever concluded. As the ANA Hotel, the hotel was considered one of Washington, D.C.'s premier hotels.

In late Sepatember 1998, Lowe Enterprises, a real estate development and holding firm based in California, purchased the ANA Hotel and another ANA property in San Francisco for $270 million. Unidentified local real estate experts quoted by The Washington Post said the ANA Hotel in D.C. probably sold for just $87 million. Lowe Enterprises hired Destination Hotels & Resorts to manage the hotel, which it rebranded as the Washington Monarch Hotel. Lowe Enterprises also announced a plan for a $12 million renovation of the Monarch, to focus on guest rooms, the meeting space, the auditorium, and the lobby. The renovation, overseen by Wilson & Associates of New York City, introduced a new gold, green, and burgundy color scheme to the public spaces and guest rooms. The auditorium received a new sound system and custom-made mahogany desks with stained millwork, and two pendant chandeliers made of brass and alabaster were added to the ballroom. Guest room bathrooms were refurbished with Botticino marble from Italy, and all guest rooms upgraded to the latest telecommunications standards.

=== Fairmont Hotel ===
Fairmont Hotels had long wanted to enter the Washington, D.C., hotel market. In 1983, the hotel chain was picked to run the four-star Willard InterContinental Washington, but the deal fell through and a different chain was chosen. In 1989, Western Development Corp. was developing The Portals, five large new high-rise structures located in an area bounded by 12th Street SW, D Street SW, Maine Avenue SW, and 14th Street SW. Western brought in Fairmont as a co-developer of one of these structures, which was intended to be a five-star luxury hotel. The new Fairmont Hotel was anticipated to open in 1991, but no hotel was built. City planners were still hopeful, however, and as late as 1993 were still predicting that a Fairmont Hotel would open at The Portals by 1995. Western's deal with Fairmont eventually fell apart. In 2002, construction on the Mandarin Oriental, Washington, D.C. began on the site, and the new hotel opened in 2004.

In October 2002, Lowe Enterprises sold the Washington Monarch Hotel to Legacy Hotels Real Estate Investment Trust for $145 million Legacy hired Fairmont Hotels and Resorts to manage the property, and rebranded the hotel as The Fairmont Washington, D.C. Fairmont said some rooms would be converted into ultra-luxurious "Fairmont Gold" rooms. Guests in these rooms would receive private check-in, exclusive concierge services, and additional and upgraded amenities. The Fairmont Washington was the first "Fairmont Gold" hotel in the United States.

Five years later, in July 2007, Legacy was acquired by LGY Acquisition. LGY Acquisition was itself a holding company formed by Cadbridge Investors and InnVest Real Estate Investment Trust. LGY Acquisition said that title to the Fairmont hotel properties would be turned over to with Cadbridge Investors, while the remainder of Legacy's hotel properties would be given to InnVest. (Note: Cadbridge Investors was itself an investment vehicle formed by two entities: Cadim, a division of Caisse de dépôt et placement du Québec, a financial institution that managed public pension plans in the province of Quebec in Canada; and Westmont Hospitality Group, a private company which invests in hotels. InnVest Real Estate Investment Trust is a publicly traded company which invests in hotels. It is the largest such company in Canada.)

Cadbridge Investors sold the Fairmont in December 2014 to MetLife for $180 million. MetLife said it would retain Fairmont Hotels and Resorts as the property's manager.

The new owners completed a $27 million renovation on January 17, 2017. The Wimberly Interiors of New York City oversaw the redesign of the 415 guest rooms, while Amanda Jackson of Dallas firm Forrest Perkins oversaw the design of the lobby, loggia, and courtyard. A metallic art piece was installed over the lobby bar and lounge, both of which received Modern furniture as well. The courtyard (open only in warm weather) underwent an even more fundamental renovation, with a new irrigation system and entirely new plantings. These are complemented by new tile floors and paths, fire pits, and furniture. Jackson also transformed the fixed-seat amphitheater on the hotel's lower level into a 2,900 square feet (270 m^{2}) junior ballroom. The new Kennedy Ballroom can seat up to 300. Hotel officials said that the hotel restaurant will be renovated, renamed, and receive a new head chef later in 2017.

== Rating ==
The AAA gave the hotel four diamonds out of five in 1985. The hotel has maintained that rating every year, and received four diamonds again for 2016. Forbes Travel Guide (formerly known as Mobil Guide) declined to rank the hotel as five or four stars, or as "recommended".
