= Harunori =

- Gender: Male

Origin
- Origin: Japanese
- Meaning: Different meanings depending on the kanji used

Harunori (written: 治則 or 治憲) is a masculine Japanese given name. Notable people with the name include:

- Harunori Takahashi (高橋 治則; died 2005), Japanese billionaire real estate developer
- Uesugi Harunori (上杉 治憲; 1751–1822), Japanese daimyō
