= Steven Pan =

Taiwanese entrepreneur

- 潘思亮
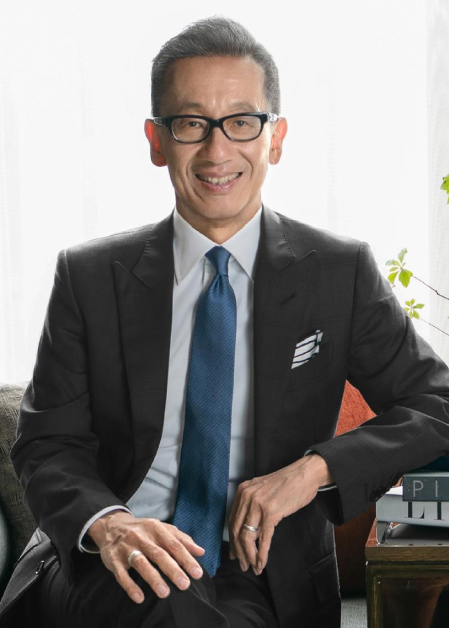
- Born: 1963 (age 62–63); Kaohsiung, Taiwan
- Education: University of California, Berkeley (BS); Columbia University (MBA)
- Occupations: Business executive, investor
- Title: Chairman of Silks Hotel Group (1991–present)
- Spouse: Constance Chiang
- Children: 3

Steven Pan (Chinese: 潘思亮; pinyin: Sy Lian Pan) is a Taiwanese entrepreneur, hotel executive, and investor. He is the Chairman of Silks Hotel Group, a publicly listed hospitality company based in Taiwan.

A graduate of the University of California, Berkeley, and Columbia Business School, Pan is known for his role in the acquisition and subsequent strategic joint venture related to the Regent Hotels & Resorts brand.

== Early life and education ==
Pan was born in Kaohsiung, Taiwan, and later pursued his education in the United States. He earned a Bachelor of Science degree in economics from the University of California, Berkeley, in 1986. He then completed a Master of Business Administration (MBA) from Columbia Business School in 1988. Following his graduate studies, he began his career in finance, working in investment and corporate banking at First Boston Corporation in New York before returning to Asia.

== Career ==
In 1991, Pan joined Formosa International Hotels Corporation, the predecessor of Silks Hotel Group, and was appointed its President in 1992. In 2000, he acquired a majority shareholding in the company and became Chairman.

In 2010, Pan led the acquisition of the Regent Hotels & Resorts brand. The acquisition restored the brand's global management and operational rights to international ownership under the Silks Hotel Group.

In 2018, the Silks Hotel Group formed a strategic joint venture with the InterContinental Hotels Group (IHG) to manage the worldwide expansion of the Regent brand.

Silks Hotel Group's portfolio includes the flagship Regent Taipei hotel and the integrated Regent Galleria shopping center. The group also operates other brands such as Silks Place, Wellspring by Silks, Silks X, and Just Sleep.

The group is involved in real estate investment management and Regent branded residences. They also operate the Silks Palace restaurant at the National Palace Museum in Taipei.

== Publications ==
Pan has authored two books:

Year	Title	Publisher	ISBN
2022	Crystal Essence: Pan Siliang From Growth To Rebirth	Global Views - Commonwealth Publishing Group	978-986-525-616-6 (in Chinese)
2025	Crisis and Renewal: Reflections on Leadership, Empathy, and Resilience by a Global Entrepreneur from Taiwan	Forbes Books	979-8-88750-805-4 (in English)
