= The Westin Georgetown, Washington, D.C. =

Hotel in America

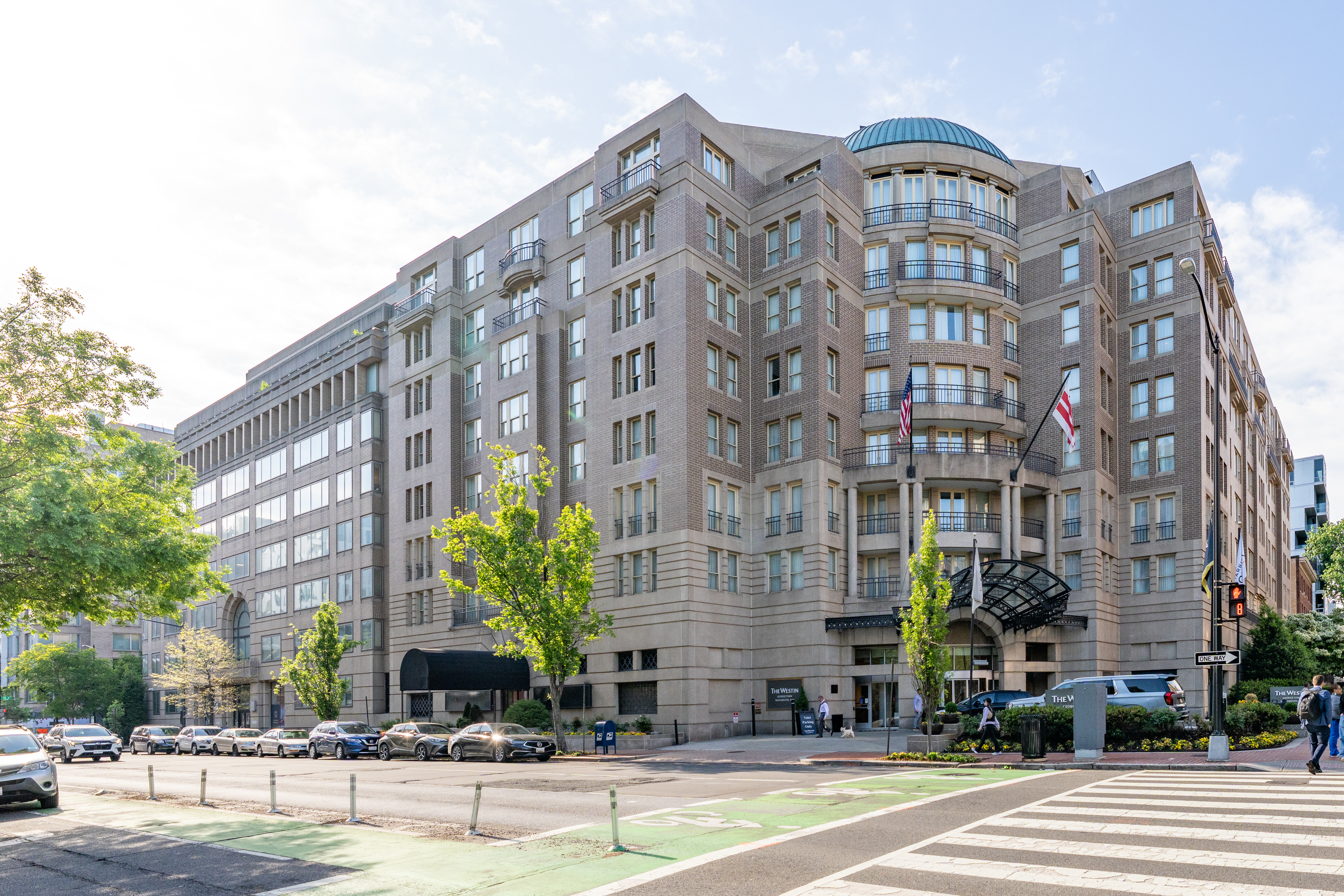

- Location within the District of Columbia

General information
- Location: United States, Washington, D.C.
- Coordinates: 38.9049°N 77.0511°W
- Opening: April 30, 1984
- Cost: $64 million
- Owner: Starwood Hotels and Resorts Worldwide
- Operator: Westin Hotels

Height
- Height: 103 feet (31 m)

Technical details
- Floor count: 9

Design and construction
- Architect: David Childs of Skidmore, Owings & Merrill
- Developer: Square 37 Partners
- Structural engineer: Emanuel E Necula PE/PC

Other information
- Number of rooms: 248
- Number of suites: 25
- Number of restaurants: 3

Website
- westingeorgetown.com

The Westin Georgetown, Washington, D.C. is a luxury Postmodernist-style hotel located at 2350 M Street NW in the West End neighborhood of Washington, D.C., in the United States. Completed in 1984, the hotel was originally known as The Regent of Washington, D.C., but changed its name in 1985 to The Grand. After the hotel's owners were declared bankrupt in October 1994, the corporate predecessors to Starwood Hotels and Resorts Worldwide purchased the property in November 1995. Westin Hotels partnered with the new owners and rebranded the property first as The Westin Hotel in January 1996, then as The Westin Grand in 1999, and finally as The Westin Georgetown in 2010. Since 2011, The Westin Georgetown has been AAA-rated four diamonds.

== Construction of the hotel ==
By the 1960s, Washington, D.C.'s West End neighborhood was a decaying area of Victorian townhouses and abandoned light industrial sites. In 1974, the city significantly revised its zoning regulations. Among the changes, the city treated hotels the same as residential housing, which spurred a hotel construction boom.

The Regent of Washington, D.C. was developed by Square 37 Partners. Square 37 was a real estate development company created by The Kaempfer Company (then one of the D.C. area's largest real estate development companies) and Wallace F. Holladay, Sr. (developer and realtor married to Wilhelmina Holladay and co-founder of the National Museum of Women in the Arts). Construction on The Regent hotel began in 1983, and was well under way by January 1984. The structure was designed by David Childs of the architectural firm of Skidmore, Owings & Merrill. The firm of Charles Pfister, Inc., designed the interiors.

The 265-room hotel opened on April 30, 1984. (Note: This was a "soft opening", unannounced publicly but the date on which the first guests arrived for stays. A formal opening occurred on October 19, 1984.) Joey Kaempfer, founder and owner of The Kaempfer Company, wanted no extravagance spared in the hotel's construction or operation. The interior design scheme focused on the color purple. Included among the rooms were two Presidential suites, five deluxe suites, and 24 executive suites. The Presidential suites each had a working fireplace and dining room. The common guest rooms were lavish, with silk wallpaper, furniture made of Honduran mahogany, and down mattresses and pillows. Each room had two phone lines, and each phone had the ability to place a person on "hold" (then an innovation). The bathrooms were covered with Portuguese marble, with the bidet and toilet in a separate bathroom-within-a-bathroom. Each bathroom featured a very large vanity, wall-mounted hair dryers, and a double-sized bath tub made of Italian marble which filled in under a single minute, and each tub had a Swiss shower. (Note: A Swiss shower has three shower heads, aimed horizontally at the calves, mid-section, and chest. There are three shower heads per wall, and there are three walls. A tenth shower head provides water from above. Controls permit very exact calibration of the water temperature and water pressure, often permitting these to be timed so that temperature and pressure vary during the shower.) A separate whirlpool bath was included in each bathroom. Each guest received a free monogrammed bathrobe, and each room was outfitted with a loofah and sponge, container full of cotton balls, and luxury bath gels and shampoo. The hotel originally had two formal dining rooms, The Mayfair and The Promenade. An informal dining space, the Mayfair Grill, was adjacent to the lobby. The hotel also had a swimming pool, fitness center, ballroom, and meeting rooms. The $64 million structure was managed by Regent International Hotels, which took a financial interest in the hotel. The Regent was the most expensive hotel ever built in the Washington, D.C., metropolitan area (when judged on a cost-per-room basis).

Construction of the hotel helped complete a rapid transformation of the West End neighborhood that began in 1983. For a time, the intersection of 24th and M Streets NW was known as "Hotel Corner", because three new hotels existed here: The Regent on the southeast corner, what was then The Westin Hotel on the northwest corner (finished in January 1986), and the Park Hyatt Washington on the northeast corner (finished in August 1986).

=== Critical assessment ===
As completed, The Regent was eight stories high and nearly covered the entire city block. Benjamin Forgey, the architectural critic for The Washington Post, called its exterior design "striking". The style was Postmodernist, but reminiscent of Beaux-Arts architecture. The exterior facade was divided into a base (which ranged in height from three stories near the main entrance to just one story on the far side of the building), a middle, and a crown. The base consisted of rusticated grey stone pierced by windows with metal gratings. The middle section ran to the seventh floor, and was clad in tan brick. All the bricks were slightly larger than normal in size, to make them more visible and distinctive from the street. Windows were placed somewhat irregularly on each floor, which created variety in appearance rather than a uniform pattern. The crown was decorated with horizontal ribbons of stonelike material, with railed balconies penetrating the ribbons in a repetitive rhythm. The entire facade had slight setbacks and projecting bays all along its length, on all sides of the building, which helped to break up the monolithic uniformity of the block-long building. Forgey found the changes in window placement and the mixed use of materials very interesting.

The building's most dramatic feature was its entrance. As required by zoning regulations, an open space was maintained in front of the entrance, creating a miniature plaza. The corner of the building was further cut away here, and an eight-story cylinder topped by a copper dome erected over the entrance. Forgey called this "an instant, and memorable, image". The entrance itself was two stories high, featured a colonnade, and had an Art Nouveau glass and metal canopy which extended out over a part of the plaza in front of it. The entrance doors themselves fit into a round arch.

A few exterior design elements did not impress Forgey, however. The windows, he felt, seemeed top-heavy. But he was otherwise deeply impressed with the "nicely designed" balcony railings, window grates, and entrance canopy. The exterior's use of color—deep red for balcony railings, cream for window trim, dark green for metalwork, gold for the flagpoles, vermilion for the awnings, and neutral tan for the middle section's bricks—was, he concluded, different, creative, and beautiful.

Forgey was just as laudatory about the interiors. "The public spaces, especially, constitute a worthy addition to the list of extraordinary hotel interiors in Washington," he wrote. The lobby was circule and domed, permitting some natural light to filter down. From the entrance, an "elegant" flight of stairs led down to a lobby featuring a garden and to a double-colonnaded lounge. Public space details, such as structural columns sheathed in African sapele and bubinga wood and Canadian mahogany paneling, created a "softly luxurious" interior. He called the interior "a superbly urbane addition to the city, a bold and subtle design that manages without strain to recall past architecture without copying it."

The restaurants were more of a mix. Phyllis Richman, food critic for The Washington Post, found the food mediocre at both the Mayfair Grill and The Promenade. She was far more impressed with the creativity in cooking and presentation at The Mayfair, which she considered among the best restaurants in Washington, D.C.

== Hotel history ==
The Regent's main competitor was the 416-room Westin Hotel across the street. Other, more distant competitors included the Four Seasons Washington, Hay–Adams Hotel, and the Ritz-Carlton Hotel. The Regent primarily sought out the business traveler with an expense account or corporations or government agencies wishing to hold small meetings in a luxurious space.

The Regent did not retain The Regent name for long. In August 1985, Regent International Hotels abruptly cancelled its management of the hotel, and sold its financial interest to the Kaempfer Company (giving it a 50 percent interest in the hotel). Square 37 Partners, the owner, was forced to change the hotel's name to The Grand. For more than a year, The Grand was self-managed. During this time, it incurred heavy financial losses. In November 1986, Square 37 hired Crown Hotel Corporation to manage The Grand. As part of the deal, Square 37 Partners agreed to split revenues with Crown Hotels, giving the management firm 70 percent of the profits. Crown Hotels was allowed to not just manage The Grand, but to actually lease the hotel. Rumors that the hotel was in financial trouble persisted into 1988, although The Grand denied this. In March 1988, The Washington Post reported that The Grand was in talks to replace Crown Hotels with Kempinski International as the hotel's manager. But nothing came of these talks.

The Grand failed to make property tax payments in 1990, claiming its tax bill was incorrect. Subsequently, the District of Columbia announced they would close the hotel and inform the hotel's guests of the same. The threat alarmed the hotel, which in August 1991 made a $150,000 "a good faith payment" on its $1.2 million debt to the city.

The Mayfair restaurant's chef, Gunther Seeger, departed the hotel in 1986. In August 1992, The Grand hired local cooking sensation Janet Terry as its new executive chef. Terry lasted just eight months at the restaurant. Although hired to cook modern American cuisine, the hotel quickly demanded traditional fare like grilled steak, chicken, and seafood. She departed The Grand in early April 1993.

Despite years denying that the hotel was losing money, The Grand was in deep financial trouble. On June 17, 1993, Crown Hotel Corporation asked a United States bankruptcy court to place The Grand in involuntary bankruptcy. As the case wound through the court over the next 16 months, court filings revealed that The Grand had never made a profit. Crown discovered in 1986 that there was a $50 million mortgage on the building which required a $200,000 a month payment to the Southmark Corporation of Dallas, Texas (a real estate investment trust). (Note: Southmark Corp. owned the San Jacinto Savings Association of Houston, Texas, a savings and loan association (S&L). Hundreds of millions of dollars in Southmark bonds had been purchased by the Lincoln Savings and Loan Association of Irvine, California. Both S&Ls collapsed during the savings and loan crisis of 1985-1989. The collapse of San Jacinto Savings Association, which had $3.5 billion worth of assets, forced Southmark Corp. into bankruptcy as well.) Southmark declared bankruptcy in 1989, and was taken over by the Federal Savings and Loan Insurance Corporation and the Federal Deposit Insurance Corporation. These government agencies sold the mortgage to Washo Financial Partnerships. Crown defaulted on the mortgage to Washo, and asked Square 37 partners to declare Chapter 11 bankruptcy with it. Square 37 Partners refused to do so, and Crown filed for Chapter 11 on its own. It then filed to have Square 37 Partners declared involuntarily bankrupt. The question under bankruptcy law was whether Crown Hotels, as lessee, was entitled to a financial interest in The Grand. (Note: A lessee expects to generate income by leasing property. The bankruptcy of the lessor (the property owner) breaks the lease and denies the lessee that opportunity to generate income. Under certain conditions, this allows the lessee to seek title to the property to satisfy its claim under the broken lease.) In October 1994, Judge S. Martin Teel ruled that Crown Hotel Corp. effectively owned 70 percent of the hotel structure. (Note: The Kaempfer Company, struggling to maintain its real estate empire in the wake of the S&L crisis, was unable to pour money into Square 37 Partners to pay the mortgage.)

The Grand exited Chapter 11 bankruptcy protection in February 1995. Judge Teel ordered Square 37 partners into Chapter 7 liquidation, and turned title to the hotel over to Washo Financial Associates L.P. of Nevada, which then picked a new company to run the hotel. Washo Financial hired a new management company, Sovereign Hotel Group, to run the business.

=== The Westin Georgetown ===
Westin Hotels sought to re-enter the D.C. hotel market in the 1990s. Originally, Westin had owned The Westin Hotel—a luxury hotel across the street from The Grand. The Oliver Carr Company and Westin jointly initiated construction on this 416-room, $65 million new hotel in 1983. On December 29, 1989, Westin sold the hotel to All Nippon Airways for $100 million. In 1994, Westin Hotels was acquired by Starwood Capital Group, Goldman Sachs, and the Edward Thomas Companies (a California-based hotel investment firm). (This former Westin-owned property is now The Fairmont Washington.)

The Grand was purchased in November 1995 by two companies, Starwood Lodging Trust (a real estate investment trust) and Starwood Lodging Corp., a hotel management company. (Note: Prior to 1999, Starwood Lodging Trust was a distinct company from Starwood Lodging Corp. Federal law allowed the two companies to "pair" their stocks, however, so they traded under a single stock listing. Congress ended the favorable tax status of this type of pair stock listing in 1998, and the two companies became a single entity—Starwood Hotels and Resorts Worldwide—in 1999.) The 248-room, 25-suite property sold for just $33 million. (Note: The seller received additional payments if the hotel met certain revenue targets.) The two Starwood entities gave the property a $2 million refurbishment. Guest rooms received refurbished furniture and new linens, while public spaces were repainted and repaired and received refurbished furniture as well. The Mayfair Grill was also renovated and reopened as the M Street Cafe.

On January 5, 1996, Starwood Lodging Trust and Starwood Lodging Corp. jointly announced that The Grand would become a franchise of Westin Hotels. Under the franchise agreement, Westin would pay the two Starwoods a fee to rebrand the hotel as The Westin Hotel. In September 1997, Starwood Lodging Trust purchased Westin Hotels, integrating the franchisee into the Starwood brand. In 1999 the hotel was again renamed, becoming The Westin Grand.

The Westin underwent a multimillion-dollar renovation from 2010 to 2012. The hotel was renamed The Westin Georgetown on November 30, 2010. The lobby was renovated to remove the large check-in desk, which was replaced with a small, ergonomically designed, stand-alone counters for each check-in clerk. A major new element of the lobby were open-grid wooden walls studded with numerous plants. These "living walls" were designed by the plant provider Ambius. The lobby was also divided into "seating zones" to create a more intimate setting, and all seating how featured electrical power outlets. A central seating area, "The Dock", was added to the lobby which provided access to electrical power, computers, and printers. The Dock was designed to act as a place to hold impromptu meetings. Byōbu were added to the lobby space to help dampen sound and beautify the space. Soothing custom music and the scent of white tea were now piped into the lobby, whose new color scheme featured calming earth tones, soft lighting, and back-lit wall features. A portion of the Mayfair Grill was transformed into a Westin Grab & Go Café (where guests could pre-order any item off the room service menu and pick it up, prepackaged as a take-out meal), while the rest of the space was used to install a Westin Retail store (which sold Westin-branded items such as its "Heavenly" bedding and white tea-scented items). The Westin Georgetown was one of the first six Westins worldwide to have the redesigned lobby scheme installed. The old Promenade restaurant was renamed Boveda, a Spanish word meaning "vault". The restaurant styled itself as a "Latin speakeasy", and served Latin American cuisine. The Mayfair restaurant was now named the Caucus Room Brasserie.

== Rating ==
The AAA gave the hotel four diamonds out of five in 2011. The hotel has maintained that rating every year, and received four diamonds again for 2016. Forbes Travel Guide (formerly known as Mobil Guide) declined to give the hotel either four or five stars in 2016, and did not add the hotel to its "recommended" list.
