= List of beaches in Mexico =

This is a list of beaches in Mexico.

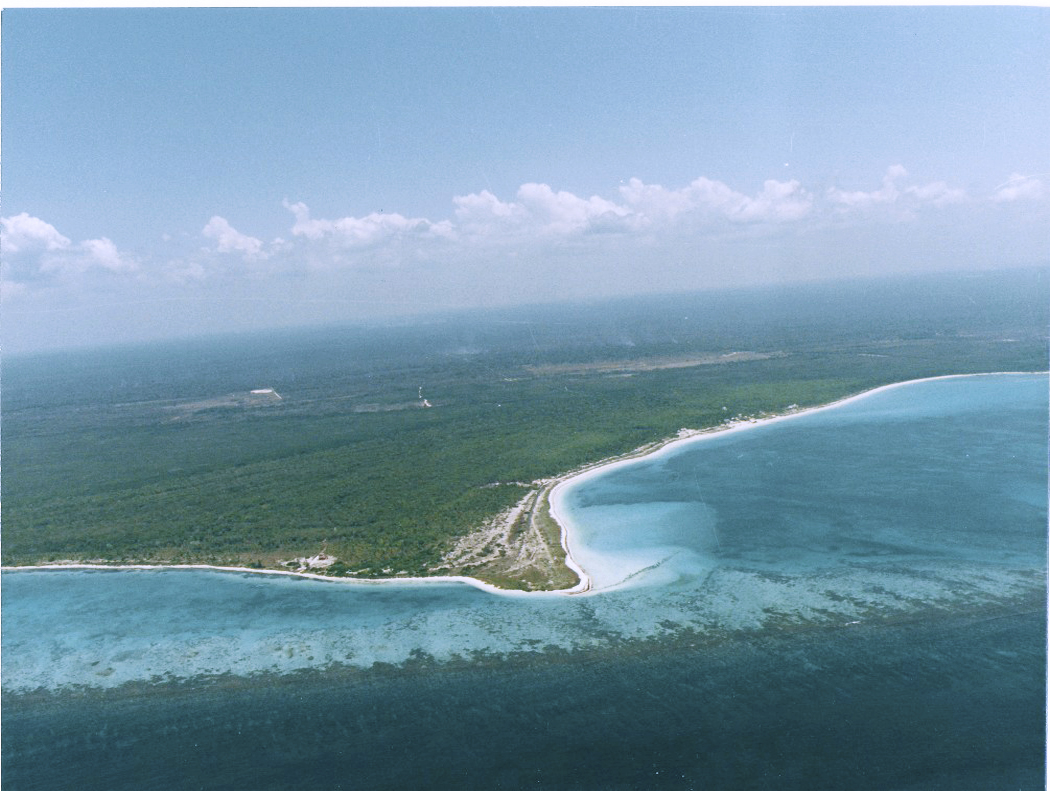
Punta Maroma, Mexico

- Acapulco, Guerrero
- Cabo San Lucas, Baja California Sur
- Cancún, Quintana Roo
- Cozumel, Quintana Roo
- Ensenada, Baja California
- Huatulco, Oaxaca
- Ixtapa, Guerrero
- Manzanillo, Colima
- Mazatlán, Sinaloa
- Nuevo Vallarta, Nayarit
- Playa del Carmen, Quintana Roo
- Puerto Escondido, Oaxaca
- Puerto Peñasco, Sonora
- Puerto Vallarta, Jalisco
- Punta Maroma, Quintana Roo

== Beaches in Tijuana ==
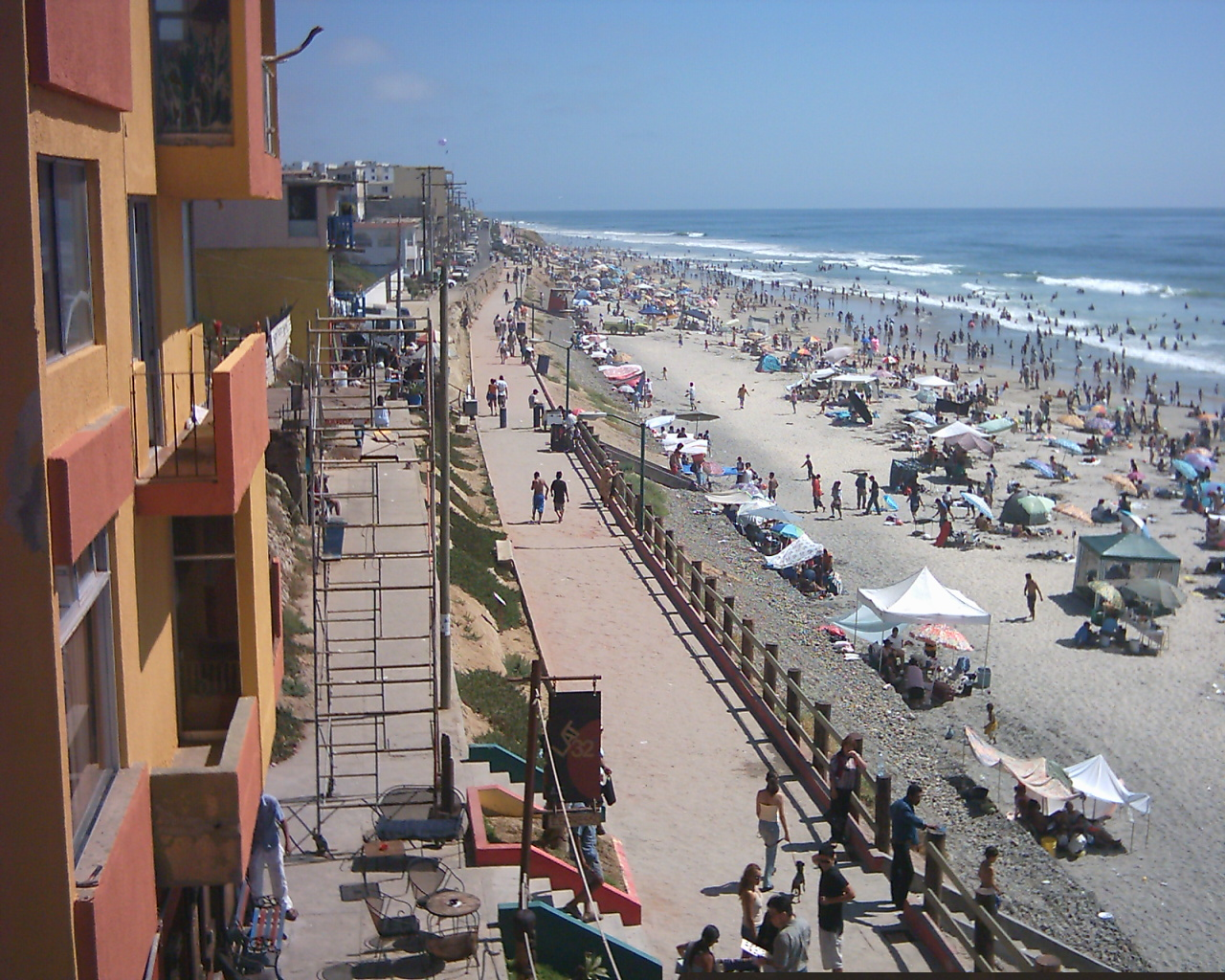
Playa Tijuana

- Playa Tijuana
- Playami Beach
- Monumental
- Costa
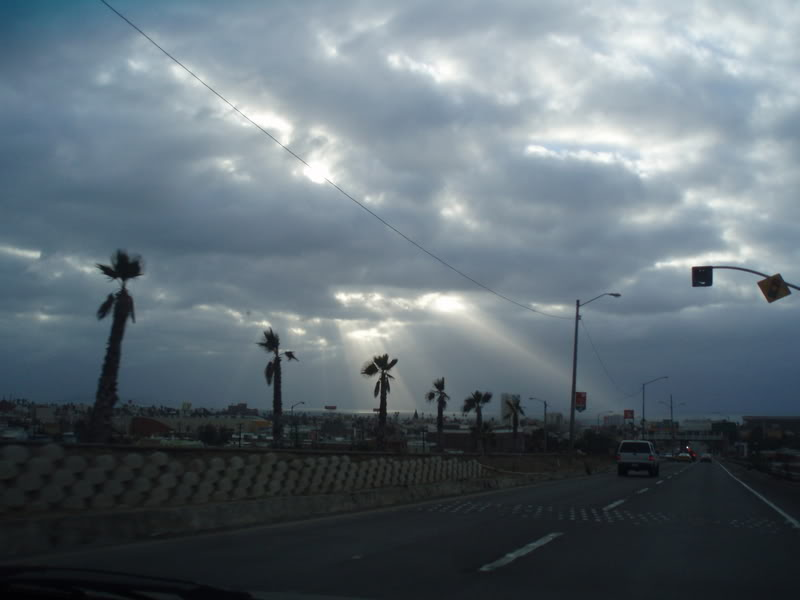
Playami Beach

== See also ==
- List of beaches
