= Regent Hotels & Resorts =

Hotel chain

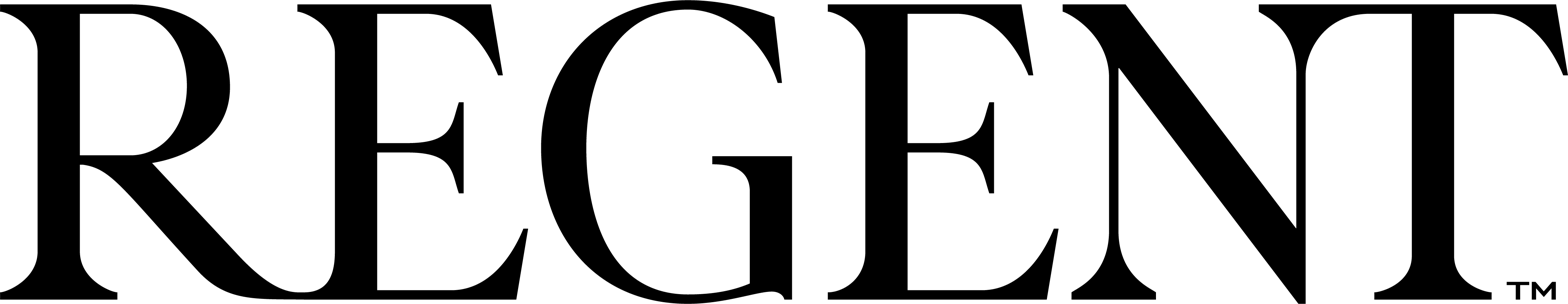
- Type: Subsidiary
- Industry: Hospitality
- Founded: 1970
- Headquarters: Windsor, United Kingdom
- Key people: Robert Burns (Founder); Georg Rafael (Founder); Adrian Zecha (Founder); Steven Pan (Executive Chairman)
- Products: Hotels, resorts
- Owner: IHG Hotels & Resorts
- Website: www.ihg.com/regent/

Regent Hotels & Resorts is a British-American luxury hospitality brand, founded by hotelier Robert H. Burns in 1970. After passing through different owners since foundation, it is currently jointly owned by IHG Hotels & Resorts and Formosa International Hotels Corporation since July 2018, with hotels and resorts in Asia, Europe and North America.

== History ==
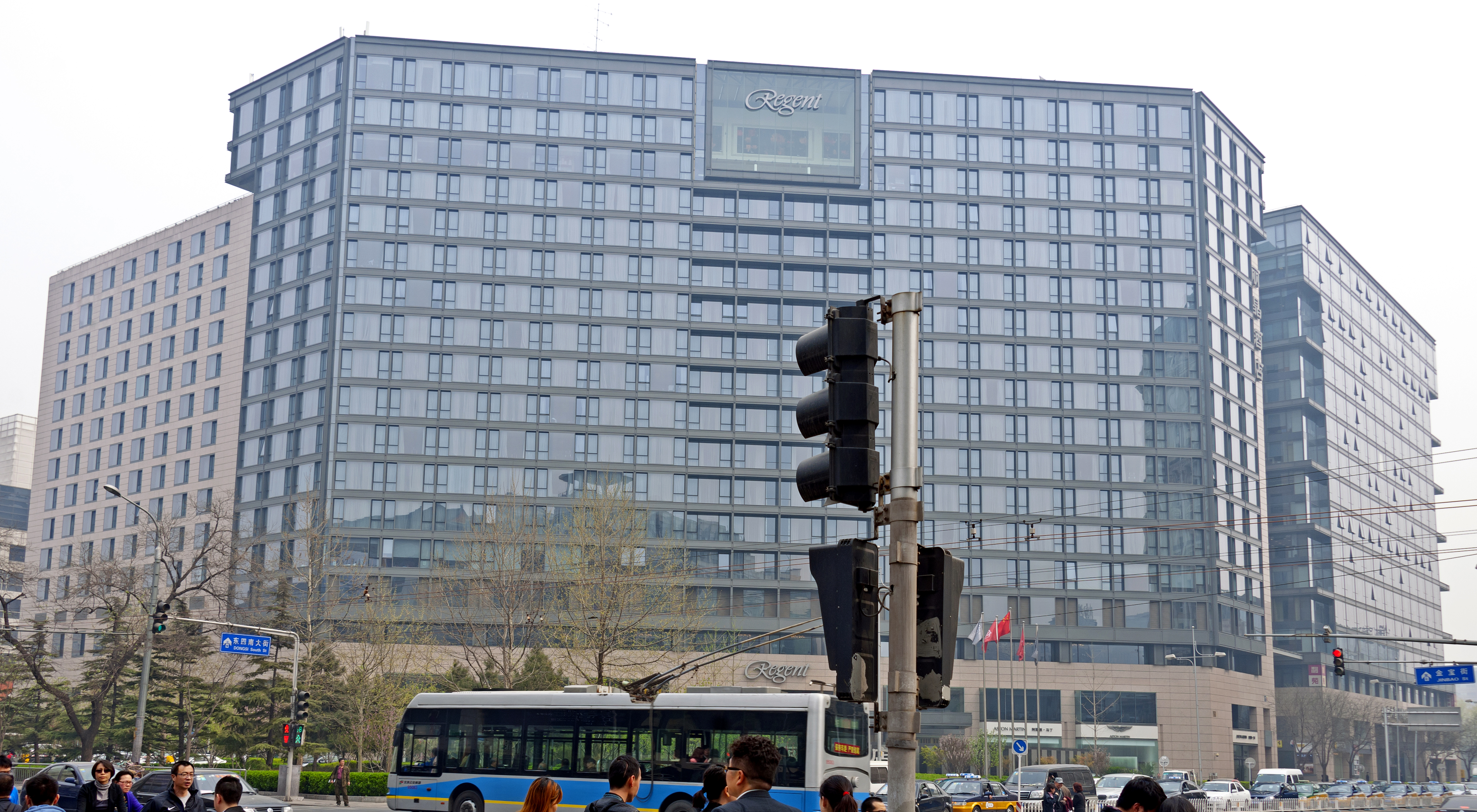
Regent in Beijing

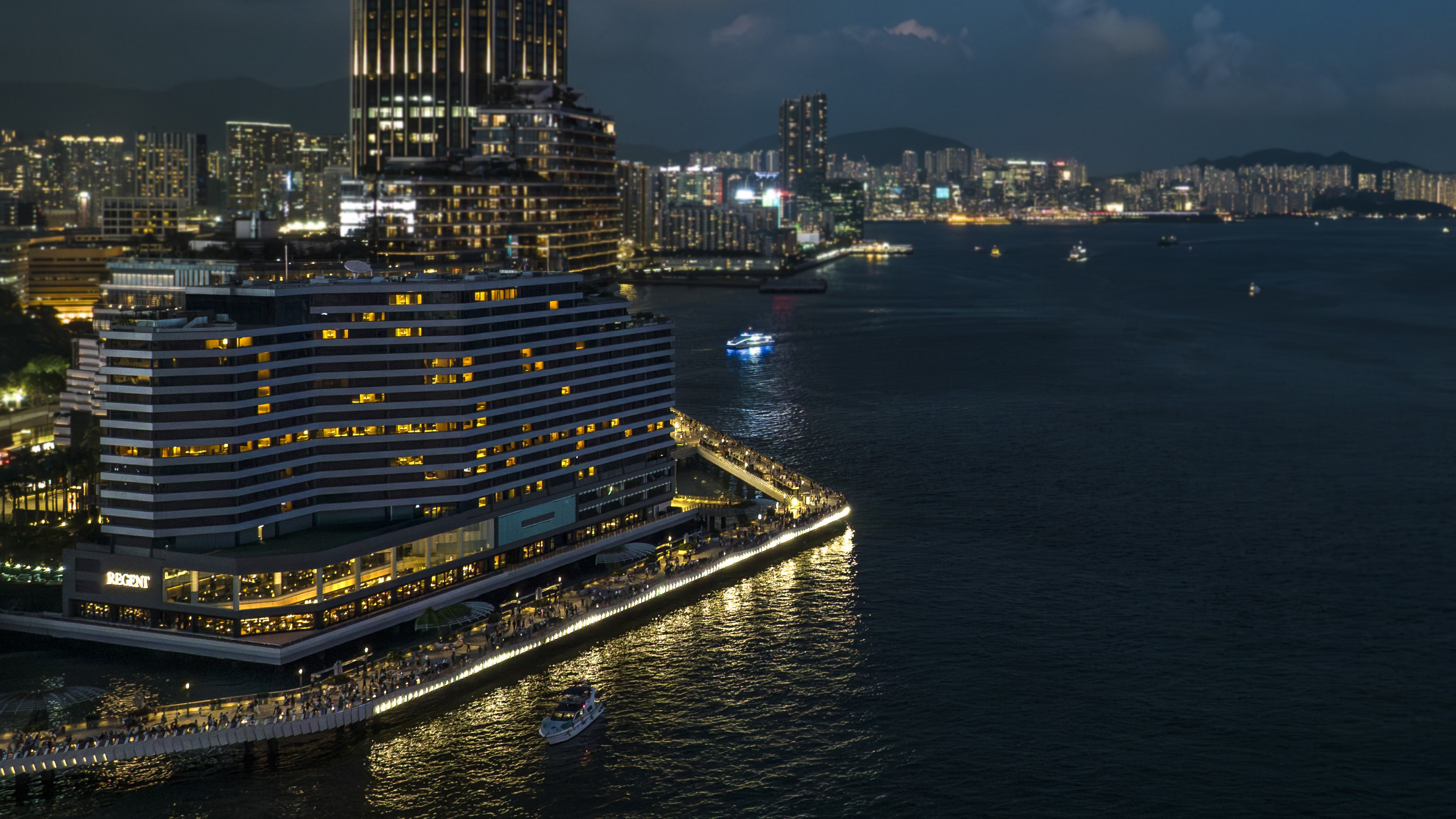
Regent Hong Kong

The brand was founded by hotelier Robert H. Burns as a joint venture with Japan's Tokyu Group in 1970, opening its first property in Waikiki Beach, Honolulu in 1971. Burns was, soon after, joined by Georg Rafael and Adrian Zecha, who together developed and expanded Regent's footprint to 17 hotels worldwide. In 1981, The Regent Hong Kong opened to great acclaim and was consistently labelled "the world's best hotel". The Regent Beverly Wilshire joined the chain in 1985, and later served as the setting for the 1990 film Pretty Woman, which helped cement Regent's reputation as a luxury hotel operator at the time.

In 1986, EIE International acquired a 35% stake. When Burns decided to sell his remaining 65% stake in 1992, EIE exercised its right of first refusal to acquire the entire company, which was then promptly sold to the Four Seasons hotel chain. Regent properties that were under development at the time of purchase in Bali, Milan, New York, and Istanbul were subsequently opened under the Four Seasons flag. Furthermore, Regent Hotels in Jakarta, Bangkok, Chiang Mai, Sydney, as well as the Beverly Wilshire were likewise absorbed into the Four Seasons chain.

In 1998, Carlson acquired the Regent name for new hotel developments and created a luxury hotel division while Four Seasons continued managing existing and new Regent hotels, thus labelling existing Regents as "a Four Seasons Hotel". In 2002, Carlson agreed with Rezidor SAS to develop the Regent hotel brand in Africa, Europe and the Middle East. Projects were announced in Kuwait, Qatar, the United Arab Emirates and Hungary, but none materialized under the Regent brand under Carlson's ownership.

In March 2006, Carlson renamed its Radisson Seven Seas Cruises as Regent Seven Seas Cruises and merged the cruise operation and Regent International Hotels under a common brand. In 2008, Regent Seven Seas Cruises was sold to Apollo Management, an investment company. Carlson retained ownership of the master Regent brand, along with the operations of Regent Hotels & Resorts around the world.

In 2010, Carlson sold the Regent business to Formosa International Hotels, the largest listed hotel operator in Taiwan and owner of Regent Taipei in Taipei, Taiwan, which was opened by Regent's founders in 1990 as Grand Formosa Regent Taipei. Co-founder Robert Burns was appointed Honorary Chairman, and Ralf Ohletz as president. Ohletz had worked with another Regent co-founder, Adrian Zecha, for 25 years.

In March 2018, IHG Hotels & Resorts (IHG) announced that it had agreed to buy a 51% majority stake in Regent Hotels for $39 million and planned to expand the brand to 40 hotels from six hotels at acquisition. This includes rebranding the InterContinental Hong Kong, which initially opened as a Regent property in 1980, to a Regent property once again in 2022 following major renovations. As part of the acquisition deal, IHG has the right to acquire the remaining 49% of Regent in a phased manner from 2026. New properties have since been signed in Kuala Lumpur, Chengdu, Shanghai and Jeddah.

Since the acquisition of Regent by IHG, the brand logo, monogram and identity were changed in May 2019, where IHG has positioned the brand as its top end offering in the luxury hotel segment.

In 2026, IHG acquired additional 25% share of Regent.

== Properties ==
=== Current hotel properties ===
Hotels
No.	Name	Location	Country	Joined Regent Hotels
1	Carlton Cannes, a Regent Hotel	Cannes	France	2023 (Opened 1913 as Carlton Hotel, rebranded Carlton InterContinental from 1982 to 2020)
2	Regent Bali Canggu	Bali	Indonesia	2025
3	Regent Beijing	Beijing	China	2006
4	Regent Chongqing	Chongqing	China	2017
5	Regent Hong Kong	Hong Kong	China	2023 (Opened 1980 as The Regent Hong Kong, rebranded InterContinental Hong Kong from 2001 to 2020)
6	Regent Phu Quoc	Phú Quốc	Vietnam	2022
7	Regent Porto Montenegro	Tivat	Montenegro	2014
8	Regent Santa Monica Beach	Santa Monica, California	United States	2024 (Opened 1989 as Loews Santa Monica Beach; gutted and rebuilt 2023-2024)
9	Regent Shanghai on the Bund	Shanghai	China	2023 (Opened 1984 as The Seagull on the Bund. Gutted and rebuilt 2022-2023)
10	Regent Shanghai Pudong	Shanghai	China	2020 (Opened 2012 as Four Seasons Hotel Shanghai Pudong)
11	Regent Taipei	Taipei	Taiwan	1990

=== Current branded residences ===
The following lists standalone branded residences that operate under the Regent name.

Branded Residences
No.	Name	Location	Country	Opened
1	Regent Residences Jakarta	Jakarta	Indonesia	2019
2	Regent Residences Dubai - Sankari Place	Dubai	United Arab Emirates	2027

=== Pipeline properties ===
The following lists pipeline properties as listed in the IHG website.

Pipeline properties
No.	Name	Location	Country	Planned Opening
1	Regent Haikou	Haikou	China	TBA
2	Regent Jakarta	Jakarta	Indonesia	TBA
3	Regent Jeddah	Jeddah	Saudi Arabia	TBA
4	Regent Kuala Lumpur	Kuala Lumpur	Malaysia	TBA
5	Regent Makkah	Makkah	Saudi Arabia	TBA
6	Regent Bora Bora	Bora Bora	French Polynesia	2027
7	Regent Sanya Haitang Bay	Sanya	China	2027
8	Regent Riyadh KAFD	Riyadh	Saudi Arabia	2027
9	Regent Kyoto	Kyoto	Japan	2028
10	Regent Karuizawa	Karuizawa	Japan	2028
111	Regent Shenzhen Bay	Shenzhen	China	2028
12	Regent Ho Tram	Hồ Tràm	Vietnam	2030
13	Regent Melbourne	Melbourne	Australia	2030

=== Former properties ===
The following lists formerly-affiliated properties that no longer carry the Regent branding, listed according to their exit from the Regent system.

Former properties
No.	Name	Location	Country	Left Regent Hotels
1	Mark Hopkins Hotel	San Francisco	United States	1973 (currently InterContinental Mark Hopkins San Francisco)
2	The Regent of Kuala Lumpur	Kuala Lumpur	Malaysia	1973 (currently Parkroyal Collection Kuala Lumpur)
3	Indra Regent Hotel	Bangkok	Thailand	1975 (currently independent, though still using the same name)
4	The Regent Pattaya	Pattaya	Thailand	1975 (currently Imperial Pattaya Hotel, closed 2018)
5	Le Parc-Régent	Montreal	Canada	1980 (currently McGill University New Residence Hall)
6	Halekulani	Honolulu	United States	1981
7	President Hotel, The Regent of Bangkok	Bangkok	Thailand	1981 (currently Holiday Inn Bangkok)
8	The Regent of Washington D.C.	Washington, D.C.	United States	1985 (currently The Westin Georgetown, Washington, D.C.)
9	Cerromar Beach Hotel	Puerto Rico	United States	1985 (operated as Hyatt Regency Cerromar Beach until 2003, now closed)
10	Dorado Beach Hotel	Puerto Rico	United States	1985 (operated as Hyatt Dorado Beach until 2006, demolished, plot currently occupied by Dorado Beach, a Ritz-Carlton Reserve)
11	The Regent of Albuquerque	Albuquerque	United States	1986 (currently DoubleTree by Hilton Albuquerque)
12	Hawaiian Regent Hotel	Honolulu	United States	1986 (currently Waikiki Beach Marriott Resort & Spa)
13	Kapalua Bay Hotel	Kapalua	United States	1990 (operated as Renaissance Kapalua until 2006, now demolished)
14	The Dorchester	London	United Kingdom	1990 (currently the flagship property of the Dorchester Collection)
15	The Mayfair Regent of New York	New York City	United States	1991 (currently 610 Park Avenue condominiums)
16	The Mayfair Regent of Chicago	Chicago	United States	1993 (currently an apartment)
17	The Regent London	London	United Kingdom	1995 (currently The Landmark London)
18	The Regent Manila	Manila	Philippines	1995 (currently Millennium Heritage Hotel Manila)
19	The Regent of Auckland	Auckland	New Zealand	1996 (currently JW Marriott Auckland)
20	The Regent of Fiji	Denarau Island	Fiji	1975 (currently The Westin Denarau Island Resort & Spa, Fiji)
21	Galle Face Hotel	Colombo	Sri Lanka	1996
22	The Regent Melbourne	Melbourne	Australia	1996 (currently Sofitel Melbourne on Collins)
23	The Regent Las Vegas	Las Vegas	United States	2001 (currently JW Marriott Las Vegas)
24	The Regent Bombay	Mumbai	India	2002 (currently Taj Lands End Mumbai)
25	The Regent of Sydney	Sydney	Australia	2002 (currently Four Seasons Hotel Sydney)
26	The Regent Bangkok	Bangkok	Thailand	2003 (currently Anantara Siam Bangkok Hotel)
27	The Regent Chiang Mai	Chiang Mai	Thailand	2003 (currently Four Seasons Resort Chiang Mai)
28	The Regent Okinawa	Naha	Japan	2003 (currently The Naha Terrace)
29	The Regent Wall Street	New York City	United States	2003 (currently Cipriani Club Residences at 55 Wall Street)
30	The Regent Jakarta	Jakarta	Indonesia	2004 (currently The St. Regis Jakarta)
31	The Regent Almaty	Almaty	Kazakhstan	2006 (currently InterContinental Almaty)
32	The Regent Beverly Wilshire	Beverly Hills	United States	2006 (currently Beverly Wilshire, a Four Seasons Hotel)
33	The Regent Kuala Lumpur	Kuala Lumpur	Malaysia	2007 (currently Grand Millennium Kuala Lumpur)
34	The Regent South Beach	Miami Beach	United States	2007 (currently Z Ocean Hotel, Classico A Sonesta Collection)
35	The Regent Shanghai	Shanghai	China	2008 (currently The Longemont Shanghai)
36	The Regent Bal Harbour	Bal Harbour	United States	2009 (Rebranded to One Bal Harbour Condo Hotel, Currently The Ritz-Carlton Bal Harbour, Miami since 2014)
37	The Regent Esplanade Zagreb	Zagreb	Croatia	2012 (currently Esplanade Zagreb Hotel)
38	The Regent Bali	Denpasar	Indonesia	2014 (operated as Fairmont Sanur until 2022, currently InterContinental Bali Sanur Resort)
39	The Regent Grand Hotel Bordeaux	Bordeaux	France	2015 (currently InterContinental Bordeaux Le Grand Hotel)
40	The Regent Palms Turks & Caicos	Turks and Caicos Islands	United Kingdom	2015 (currently The Palms Turks & Caicos)
41	The Regent Phuket Cape Panwa	Phuket	Thailand	2015 (currently Amatara Welleisure Resort)
42	Regent Singapore	Singapore	Singapore	2022 (currently Conrad Singapore Orchard)
43	Regent Berlin	Berlin	Germany	2024 (Opened 1996 as Four Seasons Hotel Berlin, converted to Regent 2004, closed 2024)

=== Terminated properties ===
The following Regent property developments were either rebranded or terminated before opening:

- The Regent Balikpapan, Indonesia - opened in 1980 as Hotel Benakutai, currently The New Benakutai
- The Regent Park Hotel, Tokyo Bay, Japan - opened 1988 as Dai-ichi Hotel Tokyo Bay, currently Hotel Okura Tokyo Bay
- The Regent Yokohama, Japan - opened 1991 as InterContinental Yokohama Grand
- The Regent Bali, Indonesia - opened 1992 as Four Seasons Resort Bali at Jimbaran Bay
- The Regent Milan, Italy - opened 1993 as Four Seasons Hotel Milano
- The Regent New York, United States - opened 1993 as Four Seasons Hotel New York
- The Regent Istanbul, Turkey - opened 1996 as Four Seasons Hotel Istanbul at Sultanahmet
- The Regent Mexico City, Mexico - announced in 1999 with a planned opening in 2000, never materialized
- The Regent Vancouver, Canada - announced in 1999 with a planned opening in 2001, never materialized
- The Regent Los Cabos, Mexico - announced in 1999 with a planned opening in 2001, never materialized
- The Regent Punta Maroma, Mexico - announced in 1999 with a planned opening in 2001
- The Regent Dubrovnik, Croatia - planned opening 2008, never materialized
- The Regent Boston at Battery Wharf, United States - opened 2009 as Fairmont Battery Wharf, currently Battery Wharf Hotel
- The Regent Dubai at Canal Point, United Arab Emirates - planned opening 2010, never materialized
- The Regent Kuwait, Kuwait - planned opening 2007, opened 2013 as Jumeirah Messilah Beach Hotel and Spa
- The Regent Gurgaon, India - planned opening 2013, never materialized
- The Regent Doha, Qatar - planned opening 2013, opened 2016 as The Westin Doha Hotel & Spa
- Regent Place Xian, China - planned opening 2017
- Regent Place Harbin, China - planned opening 2017
- The Regent Abu Dhabi, United Arab Emirates - planned opening 2013, opened 2018 as Grand Hyatt Abu Dhabi Hotel & Residences Emirates Pearl
- The Regent Bangkok, Thailand - planned in 2004, stalled for many years, opened 2018 as Hyatt Regency Bangkok Sukhumvit
- The Regent Suzhou, China - planned opening 2018, never materialized
- The Regent Ningbo, China - planned opening 2005, opened 2021 as HUALUXE Ningbo Harbor City
- The Regent Budapest, Hungary - planned opening 2007, opened 2023 as W Budapest
