= Four Seasons Hotel New York =

Hotel in Manhattan, New York

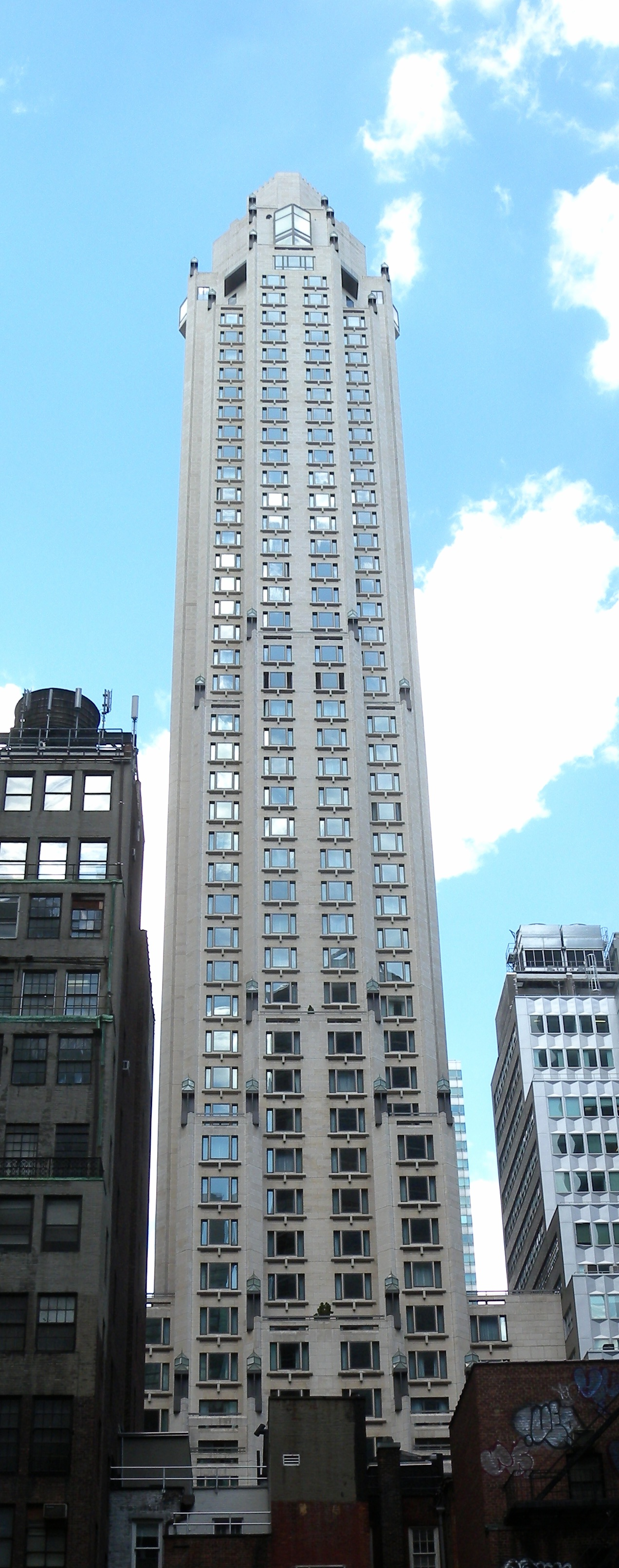
- Interactive map of the Four Seasons Hotel New York area
- Hotel chain: Four Seasons

General information
- Status: Completed
- Architectural style: New Classical
- Location: 57 East 57th Street; New York City, New York, United States
- Coordinates: 40°45′44″N 73°58′17″W
- Construction started: 1990
- Completed: 1993
- Opening: June 1993

Height
- Architectural: 682 feet (207.9 m)

Technical details
- Floor count: 52

Design and construction
- Architects: Pei Cobb Freed & Partners; Frank Williams and Assoc.
- Engineer: Jaros, Baum & Bolles (MEP)
- Structural engineer: Rosenwasser/Grossman Consulting Engineers P.C.

Other information
- Number of rooms: 368
- Number of suites: 15

Website
- www.fourseasons.com/newyork

Four Seasons Hotel New York is a luxury hotel in Midtown Manhattan, New York City, that opened in 1993. The hotel is owned by Ty Warner Hotels and Resorts, L.L.C. and operated by Four Seasons Hotels and Resorts. It was closed temporarily in 2020. It reopened on November 15, 2024, with a portion of its rooms available, and all rooms available in 2025.

Prior to the hotel's closing, the Ty Warner Penthouse Suite was frequently listed among the world's most expensive hotel suites.

== History ==
In the 1980s, William Zeckendorf, a prominent American real estate developer, assembled 25,000 square feet (2,300 m^{2}) of vacant property on 57th Street between Madison Avenue and Park Avenue. Robert H. Burns, founder of Regent International Hotels, approached Harunori Takahashi, owner of EIE International Corporation company to build a luxurious hotel on the property.

When the Regent New York Hotel was announced in January 1989, it was to have a main tower of 46 stories and a smaller tower of some 20 stories, with a total of 400 rooms. The hotel was to be managed by Regent International Hotels of Hong Kong, in which EIE International had a 30 percent interest. Completion was planned for late 1991. Construction was financed by a loan from a consortium of six Japanese banks, led by the Long-Term Credit Bank. The others were the Ashikaga Bank, Mitsubishi Trust and Banking Corporation, Mitsui Trust and Banking Company, Nippon Credit Bank, and Sumitomo Trust and Banking Company. The cost of construction was reportedly more than US$1 million per room.

After the Japanese real estate market imploded in 1990, Four Seasons Hotels, Inc. purchased a 20 percent stake in Regent International for $122 million in August 1992. The deal included the Regent New York, which was then under construction. The other 80 percent was retained by Regent's parent company, the E.I.E. International Corporation.

The hotel opened in June 1993 as the Four Seasons Hotel New York. In 1996, the Lai Sun Group purchased the hotel from Long-Term Credit Bank of Japan, which assumed ownership when E.I.E. International encountered financial difficulties. In 1999, Lai Sun sold the building to a private investment group headed by Ty Warner for $275 million. Today, the hotel is owned by Ty Warner Hotels and Resorts, L.L.C. and operated by Four Seasons.

The hotel closed on March 20, 2020, due to the outbreak of the COVID-19 pandemic. It was converted to a dormitory for medical workers and reopened on April 2, 2020, offering them free accommodation. The hotel later closed fully and announced "substantial infrastructure and maintenance work" that was expected to last "well into 2023." It was widely reported that the closure was actually the result of a dispute between owner Ty Warner and Four Seasons Hotels and Resorts over management fees. In August 2023, it was announced that a deal had been reached between Warner and Four Seasons, and that the hotel would reopen in fall 2024. It reopened on November 15, 2024, initially with only some rooms available.

== Architecture ==
At 682 feet (208 m) tall and 52 stories, it is the second-tallest hotel in New York City and the fourth-tallest hotel in the U.S., and the 85th tallest building in New York. In 2006, the Four Seasons New York opened a Michelin star restaurant, L'Atelier de Joël Robuchon; this restaurant closed in 2012.

The hotel is noted for its luxurious interiors which have an art moderne quality. I. M. Pei and Frank Williams collaborated as the architects. I. M. Pei was also the responsible for the interiors of the public spaces in the hotel. The building has more in common with the Waldorf Astoria and other hotels of the 1920s than it does with Pei's other works. Rosenwasser/Grossman Consulting Engineers provided the structural engineering and Jaros, Baum & Bolles was the MEP engineer on the project.

== See also ==
- Four Seasons Hotels
- List of tallest buildings in New York City
