= Trump Palace Condominiums =

Residential skyscraper in Manhattan, New York

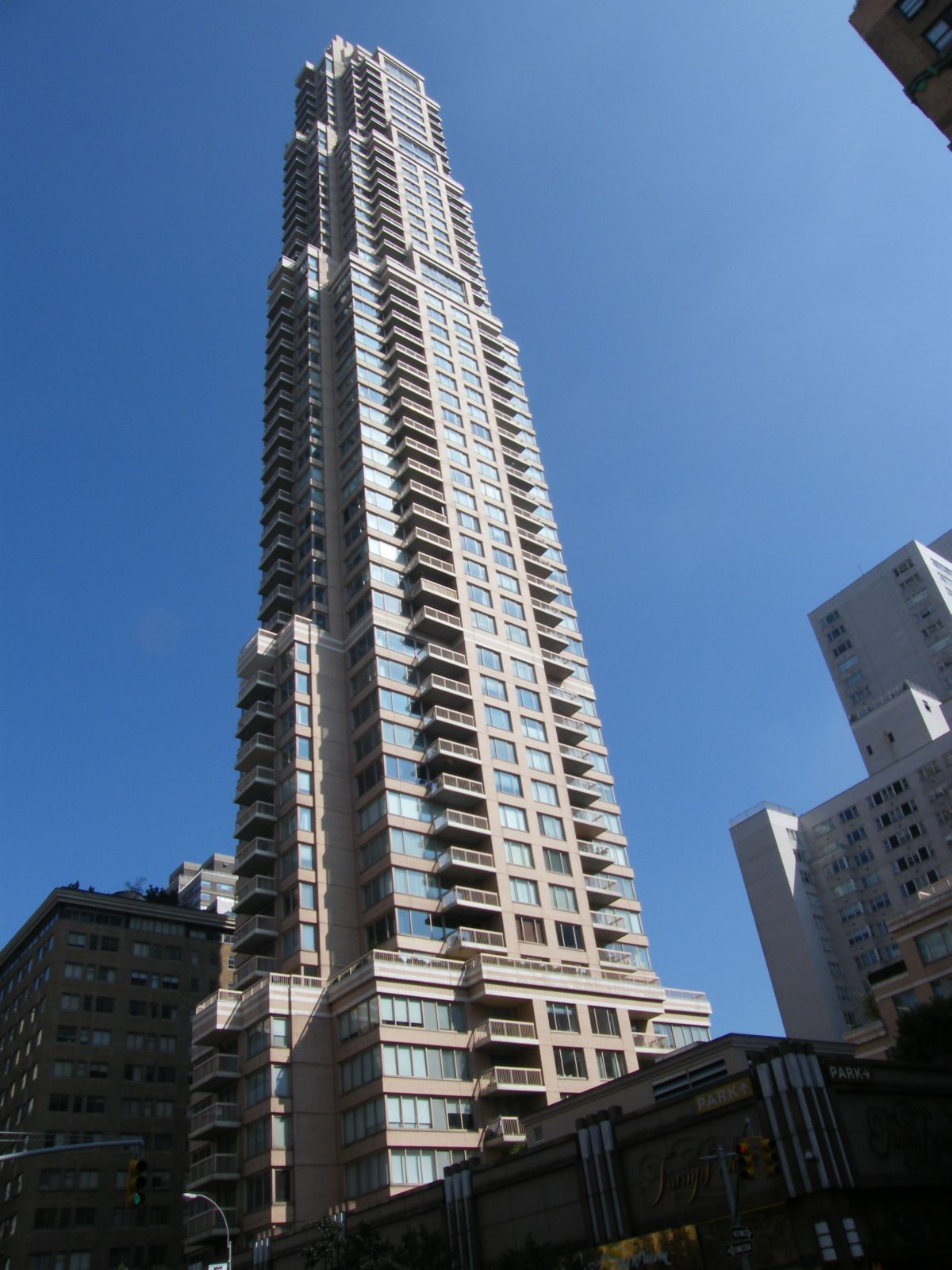
- Interactive map of the Trump Palace Condominiums area

General information
- Type: Residential
- Coordinates: 40.767485°N 73.961935°W
- Construction started: April 1989
- Completed: 1991

Height
- Roof: 623 ft (190 m)

Technical details
- Floor count: 54

Design and construction
- Architects: Frank Williams and Associates

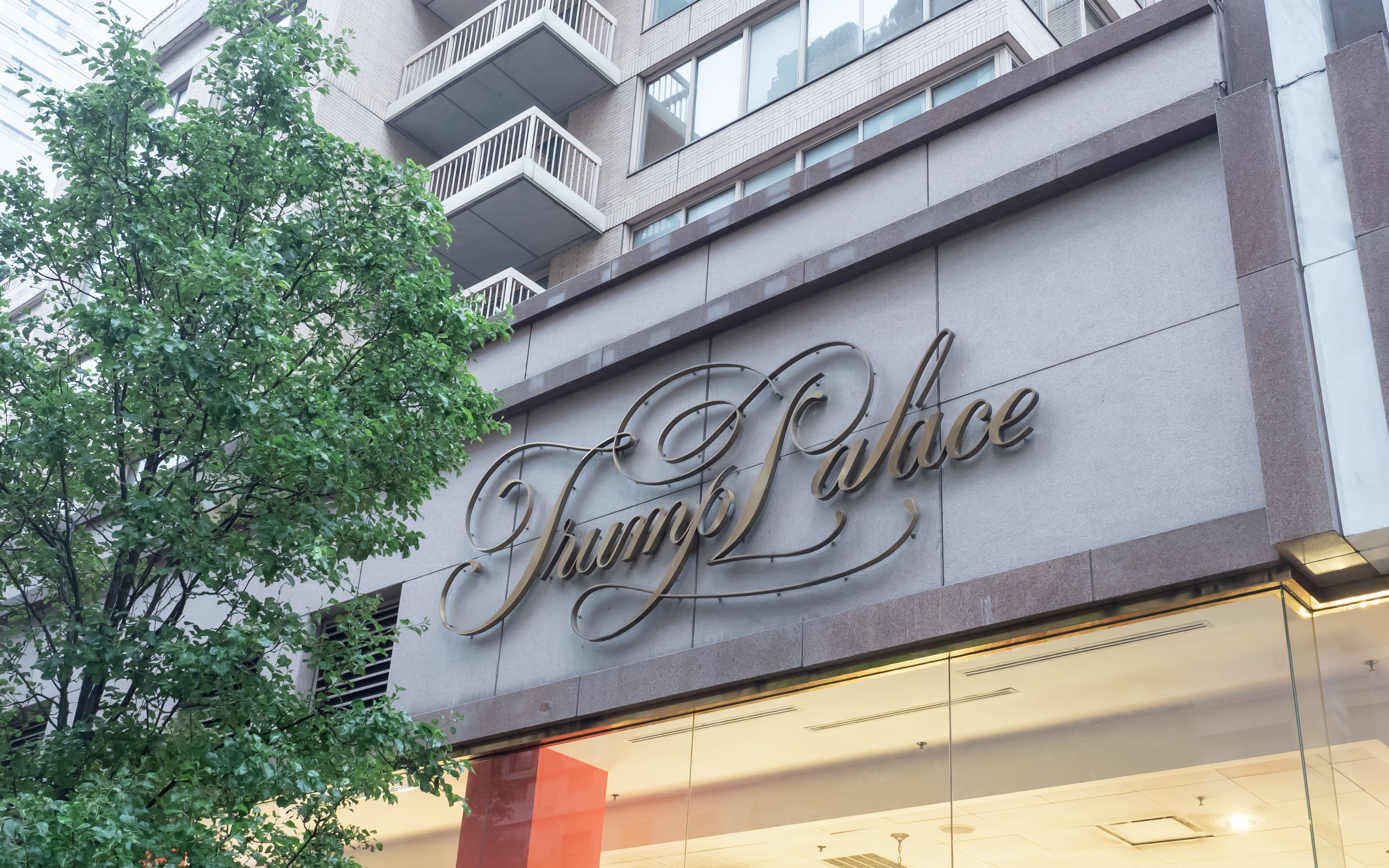
Trump Palace sign (2019)

Trump Palace Condominiums is a 623 ft (190 m) tall skyscraper at 200 East 69th Street on the Upper East Side of Manhattan, New York City. It was completed in 1991 and has 54 floors. Frank Williams and Associates, headed by architect Frank Williams, designed the building, which is the 114th tallest building in New York, and was tallest on the Upper East Side for 26 years, until surpassed in 2017 by 520 Park Avenue.

== History ==
The property had previously been occupied by the New York Foundling Hospital, which businessman Donald Trump purchased in 1985. Prior to the sale, community groups had unsuccessfully lobbied city agencies to prevent a high-rise building from being constructed on the site. In 1987, Trump's father, Fred Trump, invested $15.5 million in the project, but in 1991 sold these shares to Donald for $10,000, apparently masking a hidden donation (evading the 55% gift tax) in one of a number of similar schemes the pair engaged in.

Construction of the 55-floor Trump Palace began in April 1989, with a planned completion date of 1991, at a cost of $185 million. Community groups had also made an unsuccessful attempt to have the building's 623-foot height decreased, although Trump had initially planned for a larger building to go on the site, and decided against including a five-screen movie theater on the property.

The tower, made of granite, was designed by architect Frank Williams to resemble Art Deco buildings of the 1920s and 1930s. The New York Times gave the building a mixed review:

On the positive side, Trump Palace's central tower, rising 54 stories from a base of low-rise shops and town houses, is a skillful composition of brick and glass. Shallow set-backs and the organization of windows and balconies into neat horizontal and vertical bands compress the tower's mass into crystalline contours. Corner windows, borrowed from the Century and the Majestic, adorn the edges of the tower like faceted gems ... Trump Palace makes little effort to fit into its surroundings. It wants to stick out on the skyline like a prima donna.

The newspaper wrote that the high-rise, rather than a homage to the architecture of the 1920s and 1930s, was more of a "hangover" from the 1980s: "That is its true period style. And the staggering views from the apartments bring that period deliriously back to life. Gazing out their windows, a visitor comes face to face with the soaring designer skyscrapers of those gilded years, each tower trying to upstage the others like sumptuously costumed guests at a charity ball." Low-rise townhouses are located at the tower's base along with a small plaza, both of which were part of a zoning requirement.

== See also ==
- List of tallest buildings in New York City
