= Frank Williams (architect) =

American architect

- Born: December 14, 1936; Ashburn, Georgia, U.S.
- Died: February 25, 2010 (aged 73); New York City

Frank Williams (December 14, 1936 – February 25, 2010) was an American architect who worked as a lead architect on nearly 20 buildings in Manhattan, including Trump Palace Condominiums, 515 Park Avenue, and the W Hotels in Times Square. Williams graduated from UC Berkeley in 1961, and received a master's degree from Harvard in 1965. He moved to New York City and taught at Columbia University for the next few years.

He co-authored Urban Design Manhattan, an influential book advocating distinctive skyscrapers and design in Manhattan. He is also the subject of The Architecture of Frank Williams (Architecture Today), published in 1997.

== Projects ==
Frank Williams has designed a number of notable buildings in New York:

- 515 Park Avenue, New York, NY, USA
- The London Hotel, New York, NY, USA
- W Times Square Hotel, New York, NY, USA
- Trump Palace, New York, NY, USA
- Four Seasons Hotel, New York, NY, USA (with I.M. Pei & Partners)
- World Wide Plaza Residential Complex, New York, NY, USA
- The Park Belvedere, New York, NY, USA
- The Belaire, New York, NY, USA
- The Vanderbilt, New York, NY, USA

And across the world:

- Mercury City Tower, Moscow, Russia
- Burj Residential Tower, Dubai, U.A.E
- Samsung Residential Tower, Seoul, South Korea
- Taipei Tower F4, Taipei, Taiwan
- Lang Suan Ville, Bangkok, Thailand

== Gallery ==
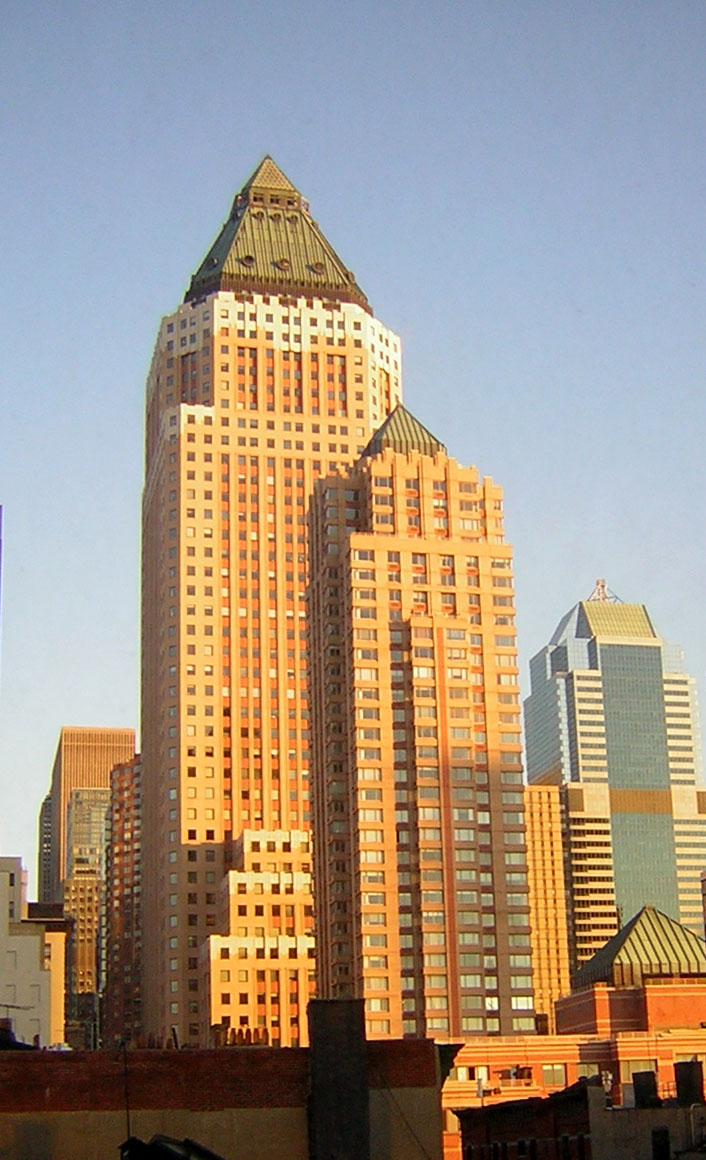
One Worldwide Plaza was finished in 1989, it is located in 825 8th Avenue Manhattan, New York City

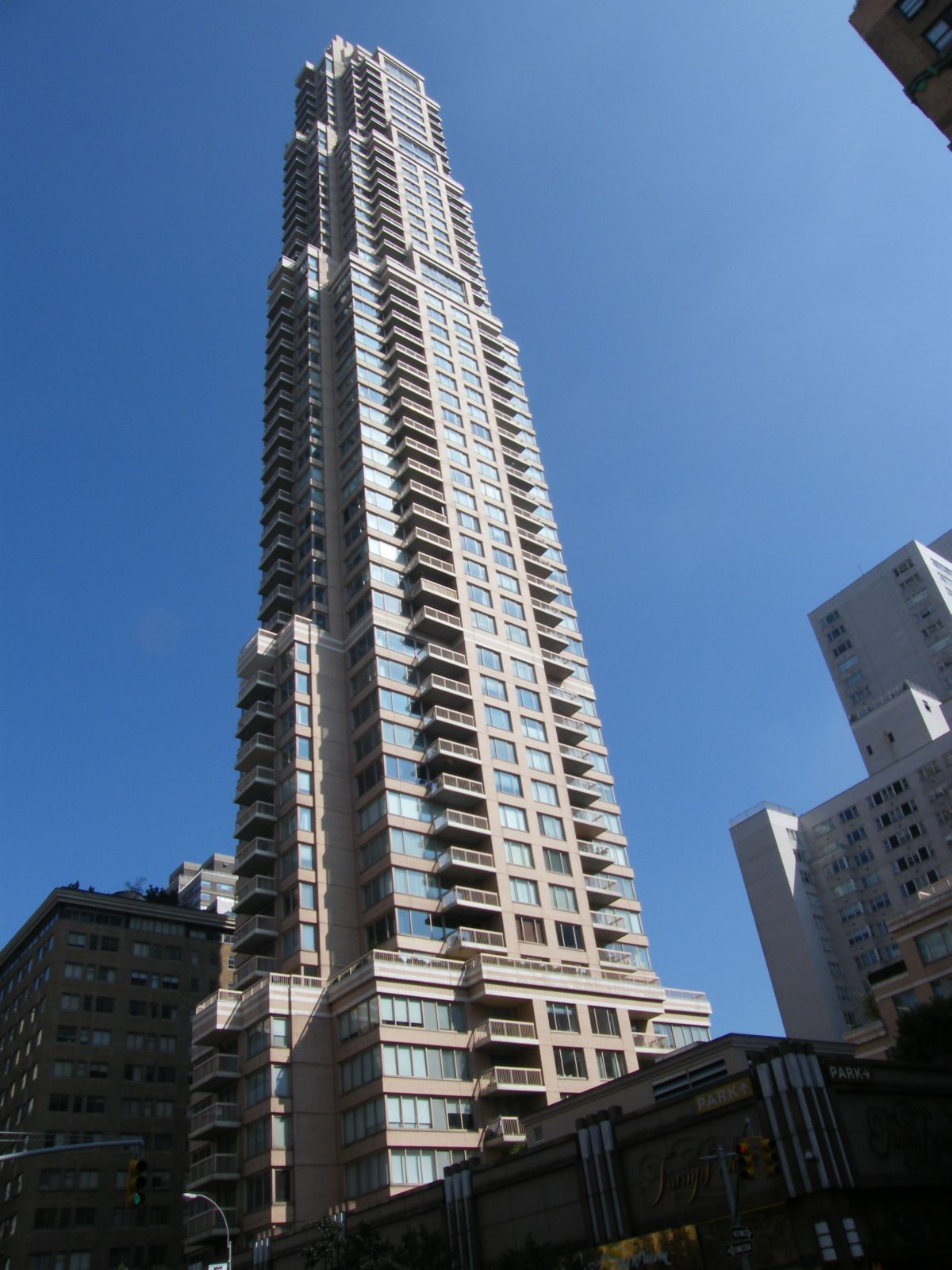
The Trump Palace Condominiums in 200 East 69th Street Manhattan, New York City. The building was commissioned by businessman and later President of the United States, Donald Trump and completed in 1991.

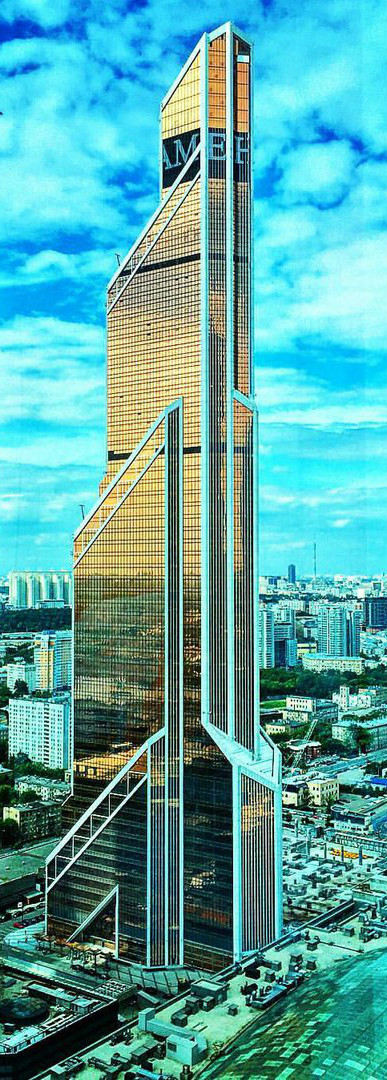
Mercury City Tower in Moscow, completed in November 2012. The building was designed together with M.M. Posokhin and G.L. Sirota.

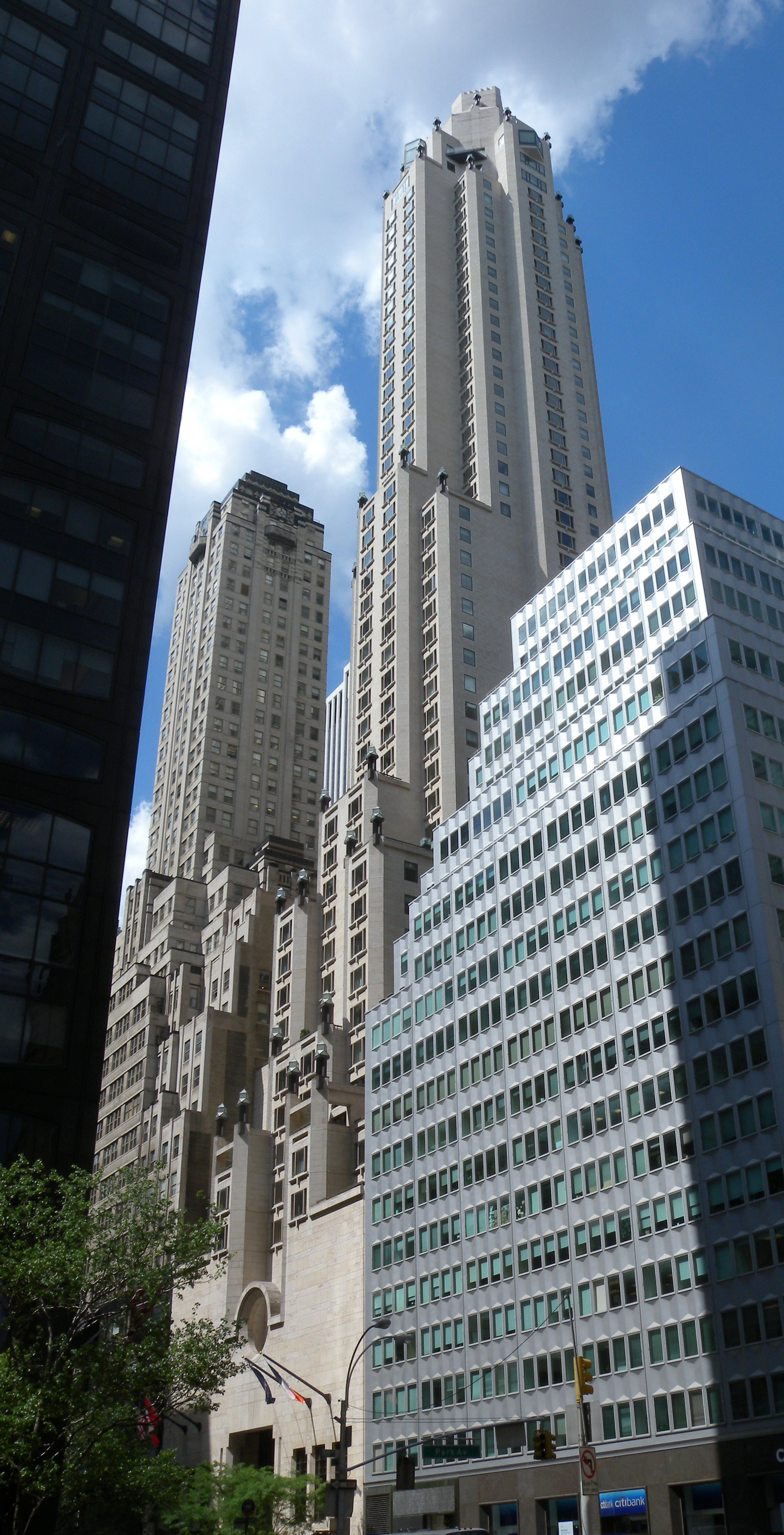
The Four Seasons Hotel New York which opened in 1993.Located in 57 East 57th Street
