= Park Hyatt Washington =

Hotel in Washington, D.C.

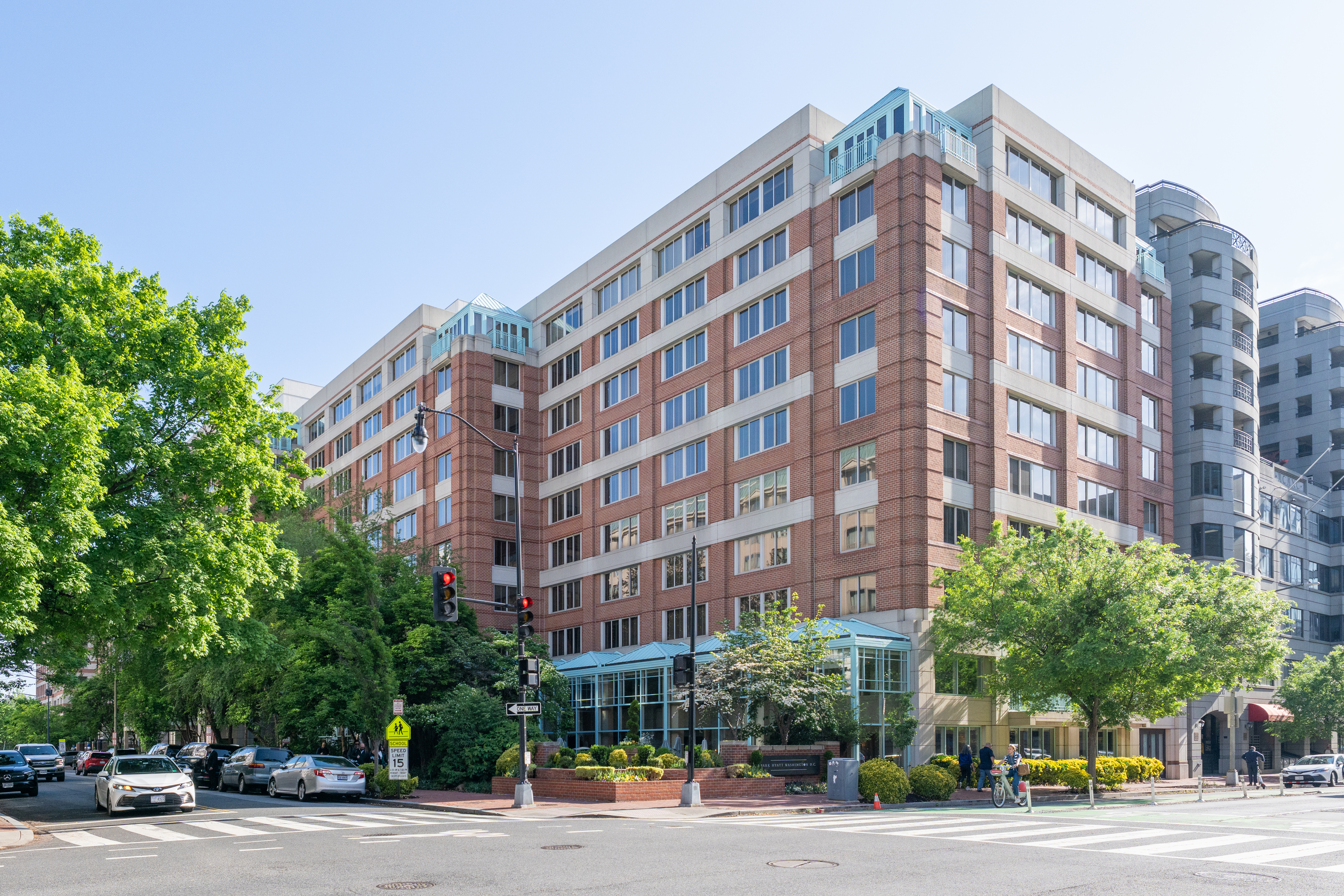
- Interactive map of the Park Hyatt Washington area

General information
- Location: United States, Washington, D.C.
- Coordinates: 38.906054°N 77.05108°W
- Opening: August 15, 1986
- Owner: Westmont Hospitality Group and Thomas Tan
- Operator: Hyatt Hotels Corporation

Height
- Height: 107 feet (33 m)

Technical details
- Floor count: 9

Design and construction
- Architect: David Childs of Skidmore, Owings and Merrill
- Developer: Boston Properties

Other information
- Number of rooms: 216 rooms (inclusive of suites)
- Number of suites: 28
- Number of restaurants: 1

Website
- http://washingtondc.park.hyatt.com

The Park Hyatt Washington is a luxury hotel located at 1201 24th Street NW in the West End neighborhood of Washington, D.C., in the United States. The operator is Hyatt Hotels Corporation, which since the hotel's opening has branded the structure one of its luxury Park Hyatt properties. The hotel, a Postmodernist structure that opened in 1986, hosts the Blue Duck Tavern, a restaurant that consistently ranks as one of the city's best.

== About the hotel ==
=== Construction ===
By the 1960s, Washington, D.C.'s West End neighborhood was a decaying area of Victorian townhouses and abandoned light industrial sites. In 1974, the city significantly revised its zoning regulations. Among the changes made, the city treated hotels the same as residential housing, which spurred a hotel construction boom.

In spring 1984, Mortimer Zuckerman, owner of real estate development company Boston Properties, purchased the D.C.-based newsmagazine U.S. News & World Report. The deal included the magazine's real estate portfolio in Washington's West End. In June, Boston Properties and U.S. News jointly signed an agreement to acquire 250,000 square feet (23,000 m^{2}) of space on the northwest corner of 24th and M Streets NW. One of the projects they announced for this tract was a hotel. The hotel's architect was David Childs, the head of the Washington, D.C., office of Skidmore, Owings and Merrill. Boston Properties entered into an agreement to have the Hyatt Hotels Corporation manage the hotel, and to brand it as a luxury Park Hyatt. Ground for the hotel was broken on October 31, 1984. The hotel was initially planned to have 233 rooms, which included 123 deluxe guest rooms, 98 suites, a fitness center, swimming pool, and spa with hot tub and sauna. The hotel was constructed as part of a $200 million construction project that encompassed most of the city block. Omni Construction was the builder.

As completed, the Park Hyatt had 220 rooms, a presidential suite, an outdoor café, a caviar bar, and a restaurant. The hotel also featured the Rendez-Vous, a beauty salon operated by stylist Yves Graux. Four types of marble were used throughout the hotel, and the public areas featured 13th-century Buddhist sculptures as well as artwork by David Hockney, Gene Davis, Sam Gilliam, Howard Mehring, Kenneth Noland, Paul Reed, and Frank Stella. Each guest room bathroom featured a television, while the hotel's presidential suite had a working fireplace and baby grand piano.

Construction of the hotel helped complete a rapid transformation of the neighborhood that began in 1983. For a time, the intersection of 24th and M Streets NW was known as "Hotel Corner", because three new hotels existed here: The Grand Hotel on the southeast corner (originally known as The Regent, finished in October 1984), The Westin Georgetown on the northwest corner (finished in January 1986), and the Park Hyatt on the northeast corner.

=== Critical assessment ===
Benjamin Forgey, architectural critic for The Washington Post, called the hotel's design urbane and a "strong" corner building. He was pleased with the transition between interior and exterior, and the cutaway corner that created a sidewalk café. He was particularly impressed with the way the building's facade materials worked with and played off The Grand Hotel building to the south, and enjoyed the creative exterior details (such as the wide expanses of glass and the metal pinnacle atop the building). He also had high praise from the way the spaces on the north and south framed the building.

== History of the hotel ==
The Park Hyatt Washington quickly became known for its teas and restaurant. Afternoon tea was served in the lobby lounge, often accompanied by a roving palmist. The high standard of service and excellence of the tea and cuisine became well known throughout the city.

The hotel also became known for Melrose, the restaurant run by chef Brian McBride. The Washington Post food critic Phyllis Richman praised the restaurant when first reviewed a few months after it opened. Richman's successor, Eve Zibart, called Melrose's Modernist decor "absolutely beautiful" and its cuisine "entirely overlooked". She also gave high marks to its bar. Melrose became famous for its "power breakfasts" of traditional breakfast foods such as eggs, sausages, bacon, biscuits, gravy, and toast with plenty of coffee. The Melrose's good acoustics made for excellent quiet discussion, another big draw for breakfasters seeking to have confidential business conversations.

In 1991, Boston Properties completed Whitman Place, a 36-condominium building adjacent to the Park Hyatt.

=== 1994 sale ===
Boston Properties put the Park Hyatt up for sale in November 1994. The company, which rarely sold real estate once acquired, wanted out of the hospitality business and to focus on its core office buildings and residencies. Boston Properties asked $50 million for the structure (which by now only offered 224 rooms), considerably more than the sale price of other recently purchased hotels in the city. The hotel remained for sale for nine months. The Mandarin Oriental Hotel Group offered a bid of $43.5 million. Hyatt Hotels, however, had the right to match that bid under its contract with Boston Properties. Hyatt did so, and the hotel sold on August 8, 1995. The price of $194,196 per room was 21.3 percent higher than the $160,000 per room that other recent hotel sales in the city garnered, and industry observers called the price "very high".

In 2002, Hyatt Hotels completed the Residences at Park Hyatt Washington. This 85-unit, 10-story apartment building was built on the side of the Park Hyatt opposite the Whitman Place condos. The apartment building was connected internally to the Park Hyatt on two floors, and apartment residents had access to all of the services the hotel's guests did—including delivery of liquor from the Hyatt's main bar. The Residences at Park Hyatt Washington was not the first rental property built by Hyatt Hotels, but it was the first to be connected internally to a Hyatt hotel. Hyatt partnered with Centergate Residential to develop the building, which was built on the Hyatt's 13,000 square feet (1,200 m^{2}) surface parking lot. A three-story, 100-space parking garage beneath the Residences provided parking for both hotel guests and apartment renters.

=== 2006 renovation ===
On August 1, 2005, the 223-room Park Hyatt Washington closed for a $24 million, seven-month renovation. Hyatt said the hotel needed top-to-bottom refurbishing in order to stay competitive with the Ritz-Carlton Georgetown (which opened in April 2003) and the Mandarin Oriental (which opened in fall 2004). The renovation included a "D.C. feel", with wallpaper featuring cherry trees and new rocking chairs reminiscent of the one used by President John F. Kennedy. Head chef Brian McBride closed Melrose permanently, and announced that a new dining space, the Blue Duck Tavern, would open in June 2006.

Another major change wrought by the renovation was the creation of the Tea Cellar. The new afternoon tea space, situated in the hotel lobby, included specially designed tea tables and seating and a glass humidor in which various teas were displayed. A central island in the Tea Cellar featured an all-you-can eat pastry display, with items made specially for afternoon tea.

=== 2014 sale ===
On June 30, 2014, the Washington Business Journal reported that Westmont Hospitality Group was close to purchasing the now-214-room Park Hyatt Washington for $100 million. Hyatt Hotels had adopted a strategy a few years earlier of selling some of its non-core properties, and the Park Hyatt was considered a "weak" performer in the chain's portfolio. Sale of the hotel property was finally announced on October 3, 2014. Thomas Tan, a director of Tembusu Partners Private Limited (a Singapore-based private equity fund) and of Bestford Capital (an investment advisory firm), joined Westmont Hospitality Group in purchasing the hotel. Westmont and Tan said they would spend $5.5 million over three years to improve the property, and that Hyatt Hotels would continue to manage it.

The renovation was completed in April 2017. Designed by Tony Chi, who oversaw the hotels' 2006 renovation, all 216 rooms received new art, carpeting, decor, and furnishings in a blue-gray, denim blue, and wood color scheme. The lobby was divided into two areas, intended to resemble living rooms. Each features white oak floors covered in area rugs. One area has a communal table, while the other features individual seating such as rocking chairs, settees, and stools. A kitchen garden was installed on the roof to provide the hotel bar and restaurant with fresh ingredients. The owners declined to provide a cost for the renovation, saying only that it was several million dollars.

== Blue Duck Tavern ==
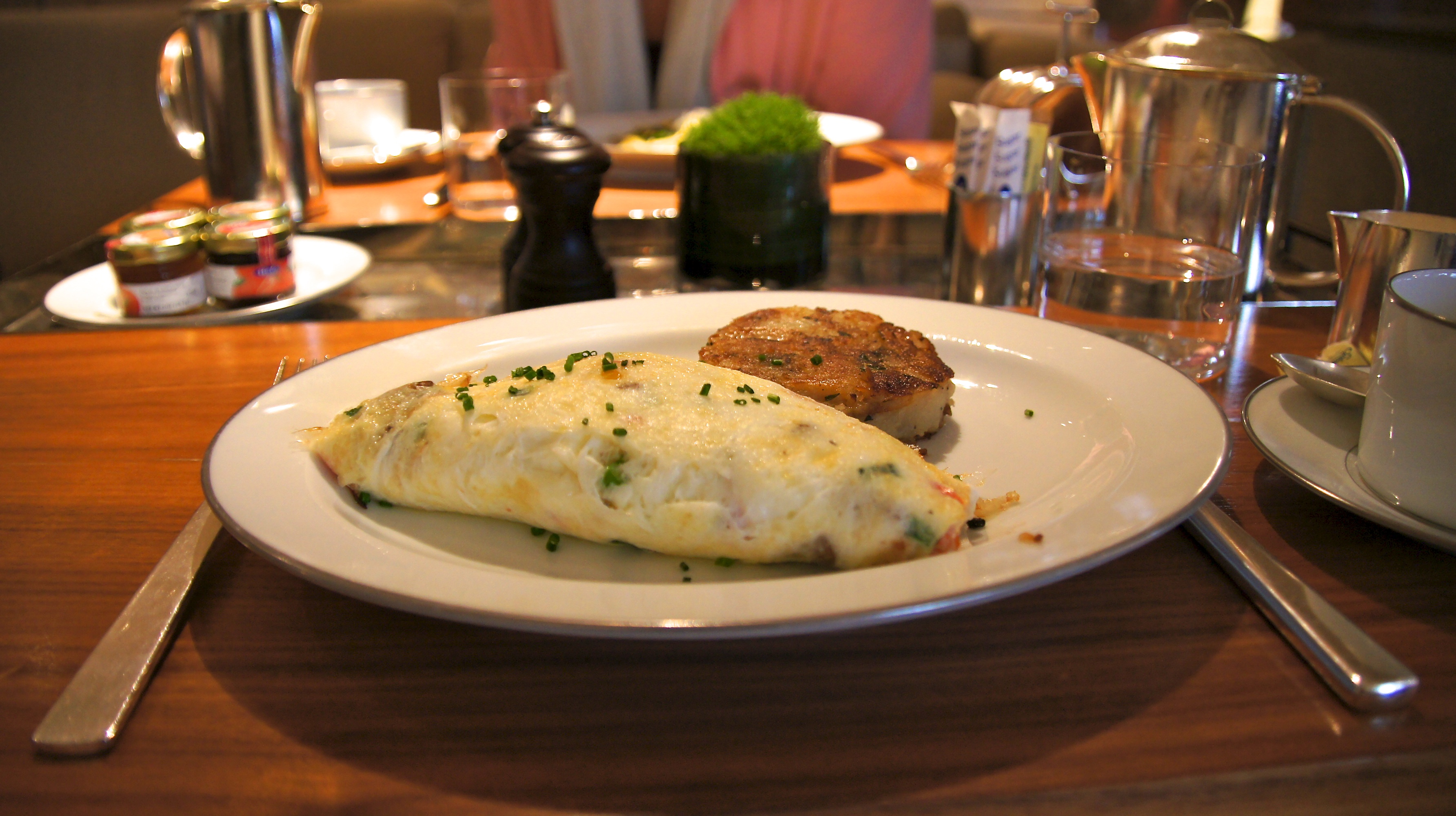
Breakfast from the Blue Duck Tavern

When it opened in 2006, the Blue Duck Tavern featured an "open kitchen" design in which elements of the working kitchen extended into the dining room. The 106-seat dining room's décor was in the American Craftsman style, and designed by Tony Chi. This changed the atmosphere for dining, moving to informal black walnut tables from formal, linen-covered rounds. The cuisine also changed, to modern American cuisine from international fare with a French feel. The new kitchen featured a $180,000, 5,400-pound (2,400 kg), 18 by 6 feet (5.5 by 1.8 m) Molteni commercial cooking range, which took several cranes to lift into position. The range was the only commercial Molteni in the D.C. area.

Tom Sietsema, The Washington Post food critic, had high praise for the food at Blue Duck Tavern, which emphasized regional and seasonal foods. He was less satisfied with the décor. Although the shelves full of Mason jars filled with colorful vegetables and the wood-burning hearth were cozy, he felt the design "created a maze of glass and steel, steps and ramps, halls and nooks — reached via the largest door this side of Emerald City — that challenges even those of us with a good sense of direction. ... Cool and almost sterile, the setting is the opposite of the cooking."

Head chef Brian McBride left Blue Duck Tavern in 2011, and Sebastien Archambault took over as executive chef. Archambault departed in 2014, and Ryan LaRoche succeeded him as executive chef. Franck Loquet was named executive chef upon LaRoche's departure in 2015. Troy Knapp became executive chef in 2017. Knapp was appointed Park Hyatt's food and beverage director in 2018, and Adam Howard has named executive chef.

In 2013, Blue Duck Tavern won the award for the Best Fine Dining Restaurant from the Restaurant Association Metropolitan Washington (RAMMY Award). The restaurant earned a Michelin Star in the inaugural Michelin Guide for Washington, D.C. (2017).

Barack and Michelle Obama celebrated their 17th wedding anniversary at Blue Duck Tavern in 2009.

== Rating ==
The AAA gave the hotel four diamonds out of five in 2007. The hotel has maintained that rating every year, and received four diamonds again for 2016. Forbes Travel Guide (formerly known as Mobil Guide) awarded the hotel four out of five stars as well in 2016.

== Notable events ==
The Park Hyatt Washington has been the site of a wide range of historic events during its history, and hosted a number of notable people over the years. In February 1987, yacht racing captain Dennis Conner, who skippered the yacht Stars & Stripes 87 to win the America's Cup from the Royal Perth Yacht Club in Australia, stayed at the Park Hyatt before he and his team were welcomed back to the United States by President Ronald Reagan in a White House ceremony. Three months later, in April 1987, the National Football League and the National Football League Players Association met at the Park Hyatt in an attempt to reach agreement on a new collective bargaining agreement. These talks failed, and a one-month strike occurred in the fall.

Local history was made at the Park Hyatt in 1990 and 1991. According to court testimony, Doris Crenshaw, a political ally of D.C. Mayor Marion Barry, met Barry at the Park Hyatt on December 22, 1988, and smoked crack cocaine there with Barry and Barry friend Willie Davis. On June 23, 1990, Barry stood in front of the Park Hyatt and denounced Crenshaw and others who testified to his illegal drug use as "liars". Barry's later conviction on federal felony drug use charges significantly damaged his political career, and on September 11, 1990, corporate executive Sharon Pratt Dixon defeated Barry in the D.C. Democratic primary. Dixon held her primary night victory party at the Park Hyatt. Barry attempted to win re-election as a write-in candidate. His effort proved unsuccessful. On November 6, 1990, Sharon Pratt Dixon held her election night party at the Park Hyatt, while in nearby, near-empty ballroom Marion Barry conceded defeat.

In August 1990, just two weeks after the outbreak of the Gulf War, the Park Hyatt hosted Kuwait's foreign minister, Sabah Al-Ahmad Al-Jaber Al-Sabah, and Kuwait's ambassador to the United Nations, Mohammad Abulhassan. The Park Hyatt had to turn down Jordan's King Hussein, who was making an unscheduled visit to Washington, because it would have been diplomatically inappropriate.

The Park Hyatt Washington was also the scene of negotiations over the Tobacco Master Settlement Agreement. In the agreement, 46 states settled lawsuits against the tobacco industry for recovery of their tobacco-related healthcare costs. In exchange, the four major tobacco companies to pay $206 billion over 25 years to the states to cover tobacco-related healthcare costs, end certain tobacco marketing practices, fund a new anti-smoking advocacy group (the American Legacy Foundation), and dissolve various tobacco industry research groups. The critical portion of the agreement, which resolved differences over punitive damages, was resolved at the Park Hyatt Washington in June 1997.

The Park Hyatt Washington played a role in the Lewinsky scandal. President Bill Clinton's personal attorney, Vernon Jordan, held his first press conference regarding the scandal at the hotel on January 22, 1998. The Park Hyatt was also where John S. Reed, head of Citicorp, and Sanford I. Weill, head of Travelers Group, met in April 1998 to first discuss the eventual merger of the two financial giants, and where the 14th Dalai Lama stayed during his visit to Washington, D.C., in October 2009.
