= The Longemont Shanghai =

Coordinates: 31.212°N 121.425°E

- 上海龙之梦大酒店
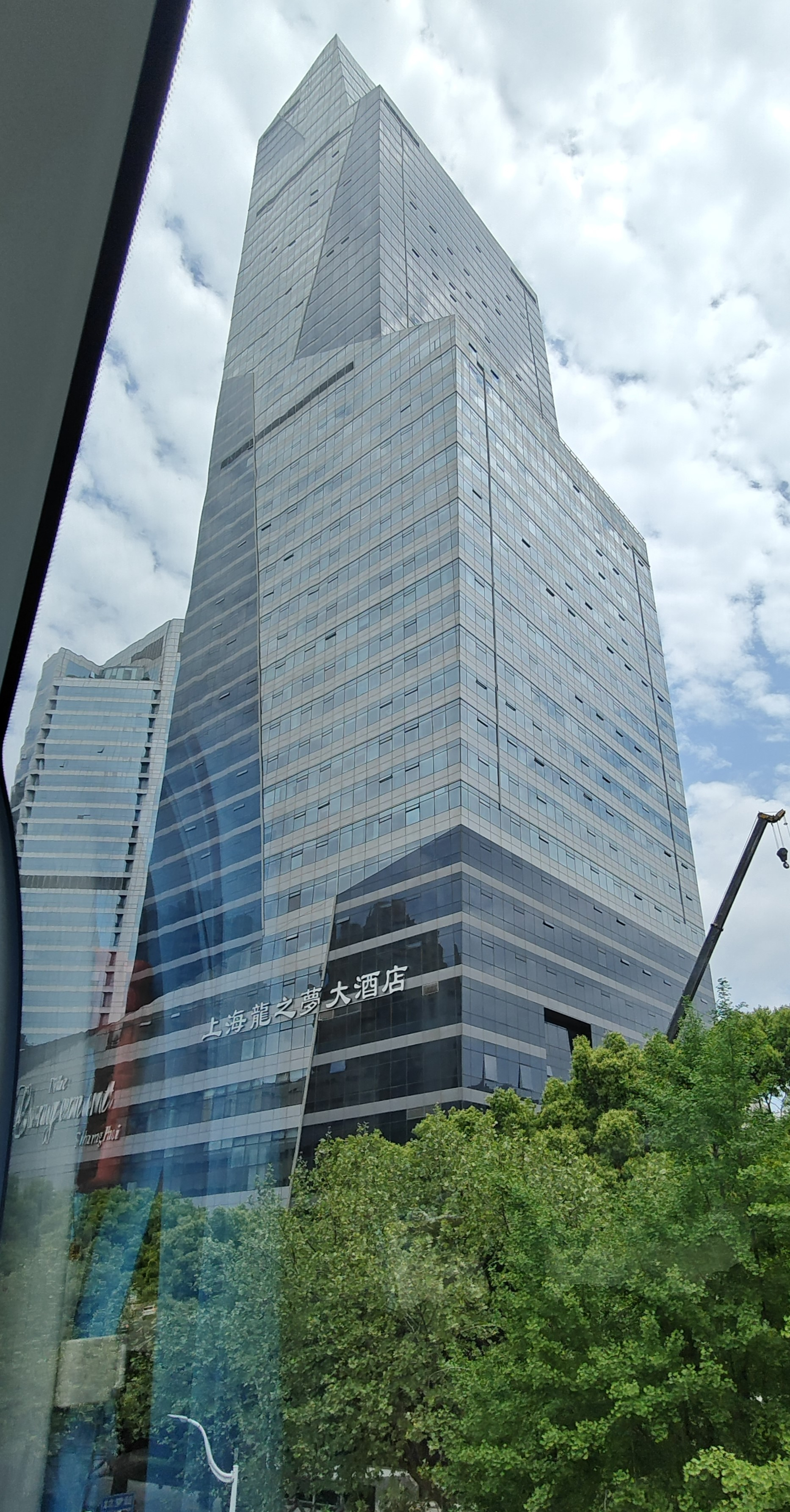
- Longemont Shanghai in 2026

General information
- Type: Hotel, Offices
- Location: Changning District, Shanghai, China
- Completed: 2005

Height
- Antenna spire: 218 m (715 ft)

Technical details
- Floor count: 53
- Floor area: 135,000 m^{2} (1,450,000 sq ft)

Design and construction
- Architects: Arquitectonica, East China Architectural Design & Research Institute Co. Ltd.

The Longemont Shanghai (Chinese: 上海龙之梦大酒店; pinyin: Shànghǎi Lóngzhīmèng DàJiǔdiàn) is a skyscraper and mixed use building in the Changning District of Shanghai, China. It contains the Longemont Hotel as well as office space. It is 218 metres (715 ft) high, has 53 stories and was completed in 2005. It used to be the first Regent Hotel in Mainland China, known as The Longemont Regent Shanghai until its rebranding in 2008.

== See also ==
- List of tallest buildings in Shanghai
