= Legacy Hotels Real Estate Investment Trust =

Legacy Hotels Real Estate Investment Trust was a real estate investment trust (REIT) that was based in Toronto, Ontario.

== History ==
It was established in 1997 and was owner of 24 hotel and resort properties most of which are located in Canada, but it also had a couple in the United States. Its hotels operate under the Fairmont and Delta names.

It had a 24% stake in Fairmont, the rest held by Colony Capital and Kingdom Holding Company.

The company was acquired by LGY Acquisition LP effective September 18, 2007, and delisted from the Toronto Stock Exchange.

== See also ==
- Kingdom Holding Company
