= Regent Taipei =

Hotel in Taipei

- 台北晶華酒店

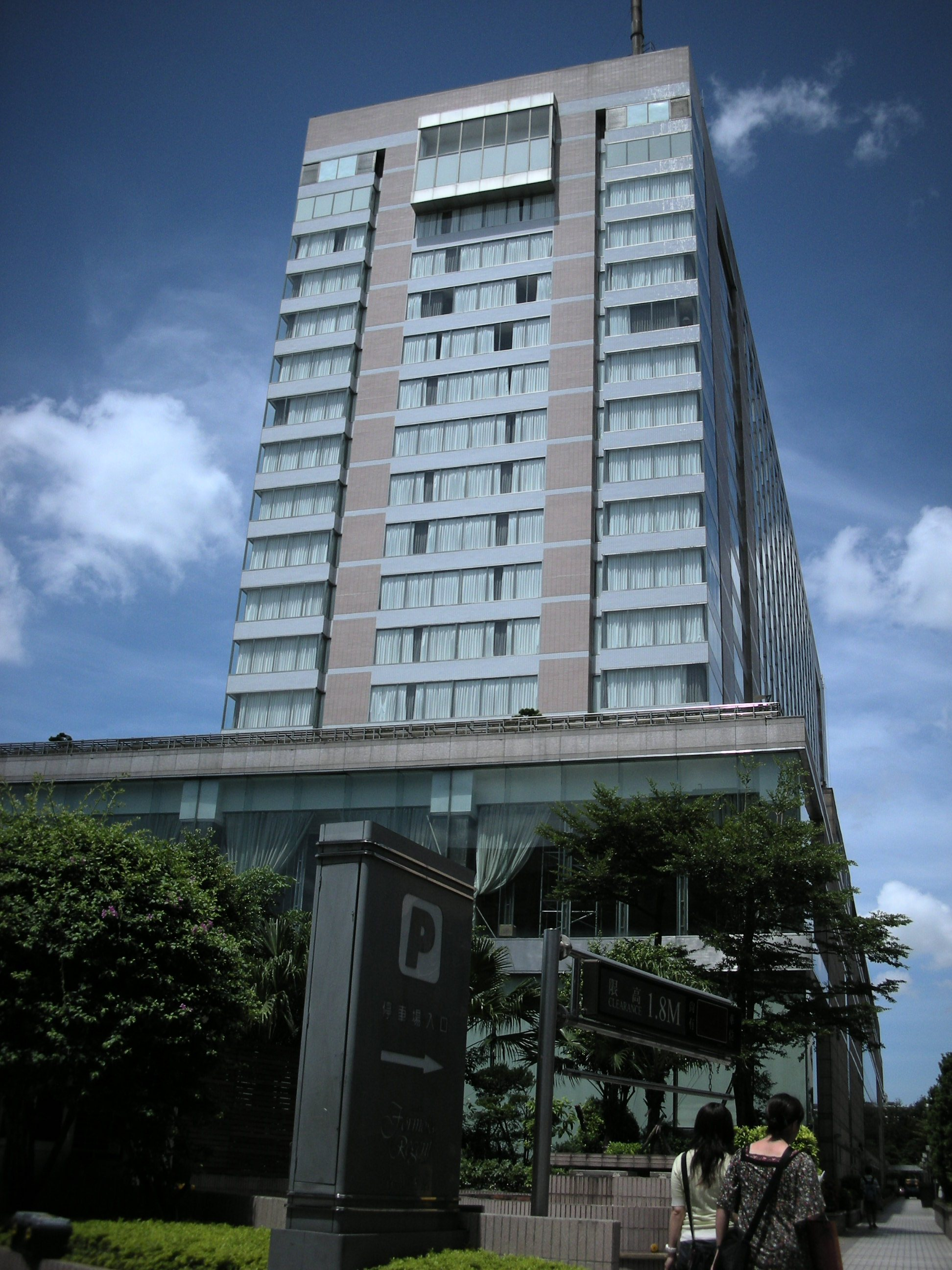
- Interactive map of the Regent Taipei area
- Former names: The Grand Formosa Regent

General information
- Location: 25.05413°N 121.52398°E, No 3, Lane 39, Section 2, ZhongShan N, Rd., Zhongshan, Taipei, Taiwan
- Opened: 1990

Regent Taipei (Chinese: 晶華酒店; pinyin: Jīnghuá Jiǔdiàn) is a luxury hotel in Zhongshan District, Taipei, Taiwan. It opened in 1990 as the Regent Taipei, and later became the Grand Formosa Regent before reverting to its current name. It is owned and operated under brand Regent Hotels & Resorts which jointly owned by IHG Hotels & Resorts and Silks Hotel Group.

== History ==
Regent Taipei was conceptualised in 1973 by Formosa International Hotels founder, S.R. Pan, upon the need for a luxury hotel in Taipei. This was later realised in 1984 when Y.H. Chen of Tuntex Group cooperated with Pan to build this hotel. An agreement with Regent International Hotels was signed the same year to manage the hotel. The hotel opened in 1990 as The Regent Taipei. In 2011, the hotel name was reverted to Regent Taipei after being titled Grand Formosa Regent for 17 years.

== Restaurants and shops ==
The hotel is home to Azie Grand Cafe, one of the eight restaurants housed within Regent Taipei. The restaurant is known for its beef noodles which was claimed to be one of the best by the Taipei Beef Noodle Festival as well as CNN Travel in 2015.

=== Regent Galleria ===
Regent Galleria occupies a two-story space that occupies the entirety of the hotel's basement. It features boutiques such as Chanel, Chopard, Harry Winston, Bulgari, Hermés, Bottega Veneta, Loro Piana, Louis Vuitton and Bang & Olufsen.

== In popular culture ==
The hotel's lobby, entrance and its Presidential Suite were featured in 2014 film Lucy by Luc Besson.

== See also ==
- Regent Hotels & Resorts
- IHG Hotels & Resorts
- National Palace Museum (operating the official restaurant, Silks Palace)
