= Harunori Takahashi =

Japanese property developer

- Born: 1945/46
- Died: 18 July 2005
- Occupation: property developer
- Spouse: Aki Takahashi
- Children: 2

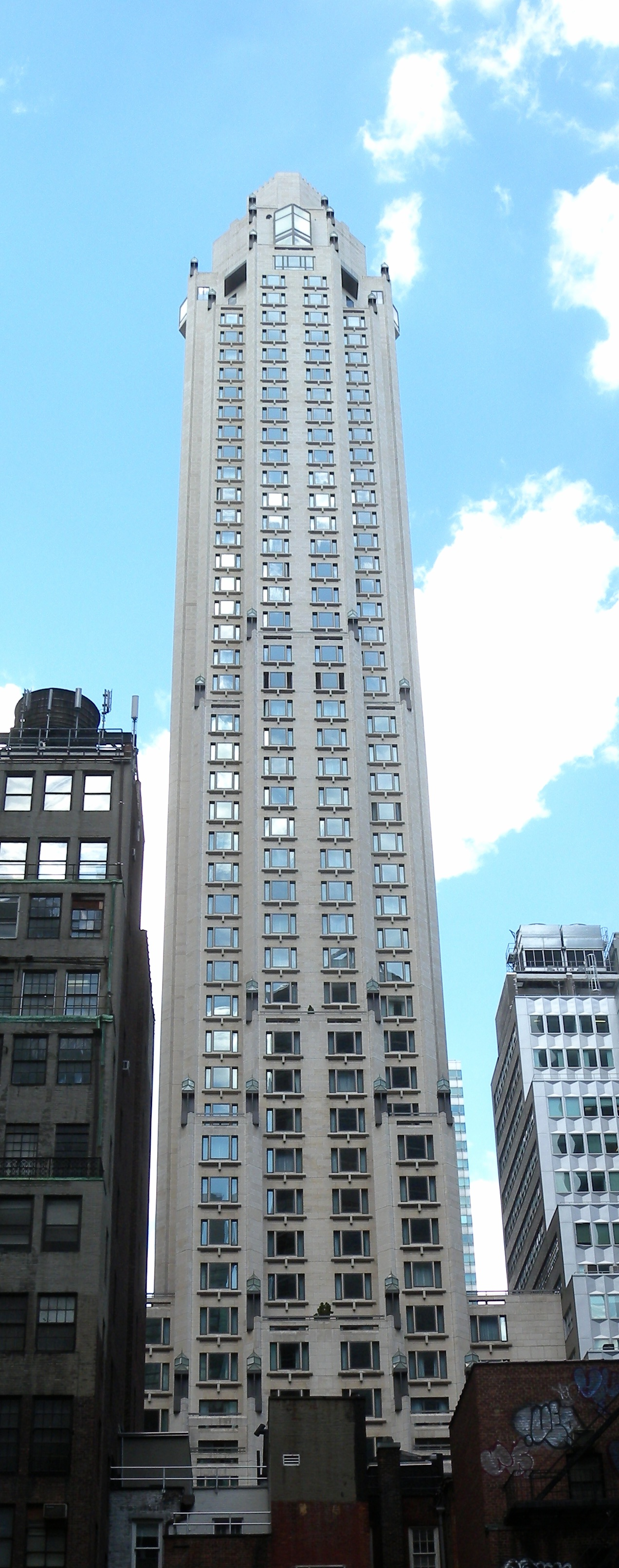
Four Seasons Hotel New York

Harunori Takahashi (高橋 治則, Takahashi Harunori; 1945/46 - 18 July 2005) was a Japanese billionaire property developer and the head of EIE International Corp.

== Early life ==
Harunori Takahashi came from a prominent family in western Japan, near Nagasaki, and was descended from a pre-war Prime Minister. His father Yoshiharu Takahashi saved EIE from bankruptcy in June 1975.

== Career ==
Takahashi was head of the privately owned EIE International Corp, which at one time owned one trillion yen in real estate assets.

In 1986, EIE acquired a 35% stake in Regent Hotels & Resorts. In 1989, Takahashi started building what was to become The Regent New York on 57th Street, designed by I. M. Pei. In a 1991 New York Times profile, he was compared to Donald Trump, as a "brash" developer with a "hectic pace of property acquisitions", under pressure from banks and "struggling under $6 billion in shaky debt".

At his peak, Takahashi owned Regent and Hyatt hotels across Asia, a floating hotel in Vietnam's Ho Chi Minh City, 50% of Australia's Bond University, Denarau Island in Fiji, and was building a thousand-mile railway in Australia's.

EIE sold Regent to Four Seasons Hotels in 1992 and the New York hotel eventually opened as the Four Seasons Hotel New York.

== Personal life ==
He was married to Aki Takahashi, and they had two children, Ichiro Takahashi and Makiko Komai.

Takahashi died on 18 July 2005, aged 59, following a brain haemorrhage in a hospital in Tokyo.
