= Expense account =

An expense account is the right to reimbursement of money spent by employees for work-related purposes. Some common expense accounts are Cost of sales, utilities expense, discount allowed, cleaning expense, depreciation expense, delivery expense, income tax expense, insurance expense, interest expense, advertising expense, promotion expense, repairs expense, maintenance expense, rent expense, salaries and wages expense, transportation expense, supplies expense and refreshment expense.

== Normal balance ==
To increase an expense account, it must be debited. To decrease an expense account, it must be credited. The normal expense account balance is a debit. In order to understand why expenses are debited, it is relevant to note the accounting equation, Assets = Liabilities + Equity. Expenses show up under the equity portion of the equation because equity is common stock plus retained earnings and retained earnings are revenues minus expenses minus dividends. Expenses are considered temporary accounts in this equation, because at the end of the period, expense accounts are closed. Because expense accounts decrease the credit balance of owner's equity, expenses must be debited.

== Closing expense accounts ==
At the end of the year, expense accounts need to be closed, or zeroed out. Expense accounts need to be closed because they are temporary, meaning that they pertain only to a given accounting period and won't carry over into the next one. When expense accounts are closed, they close to another temporary account, known as Income Summary. So, the expense accounts must be credited, and the Income Summary will be debited. The net loss or gain in this account transfers to Retained Earnings, which is a permanent account.

== Contra expense accounts ==
Contra accounts are accounts that are related, yet separate from its particular account. A contra expense account will behave in the opposite way a normal expense account will; instead of debiting to increase, a contra account must credit to increase. Instead of crediting to decrease, it will be credited to increase. An example of a contra expense account is Purchase Returns and Allowances.

== US tax treatment ==
In the United States, the use of an expense account can be traced back to George Washington, who chose to forego a salary and relied on an expense account to cover his purchases during his military leadership in the American Revolution.

Under today's tax laws of the United States, expense accounts are treated as either "accountable" or "unaccountable". Accountable expense accounts are subject to a variety of Internal Revenue Service regulations. There must be a documented business purpose for the account. Spending from the account must be documentable, typically by means of receipts. Any money entrusted to the employee from the account that is not spent for business purposes and accounted for must be returned to the employer.

Money paid to an employee under an accountable expense account is not treated as taxable income to the employee; Where as money paid to an employee under an unaccountable plan is treated as income to the employee. Business expenses paid out of a nonaccountable plan are deductible from the employee's taxable income only as miscellaneous itemized deductions, and even then, they are only deductible if the expenses are equal to or greater than 2% of the employee's income.

Special rules govern certain types of business expenses, including rules for travel, entertainment, food, and gifts.

Expense accounts are also privately regulated by internal auditors for many employers, often to ensure funds are handled appropriately.

== See also ==
- Freight expense
