= Punta Maroma =

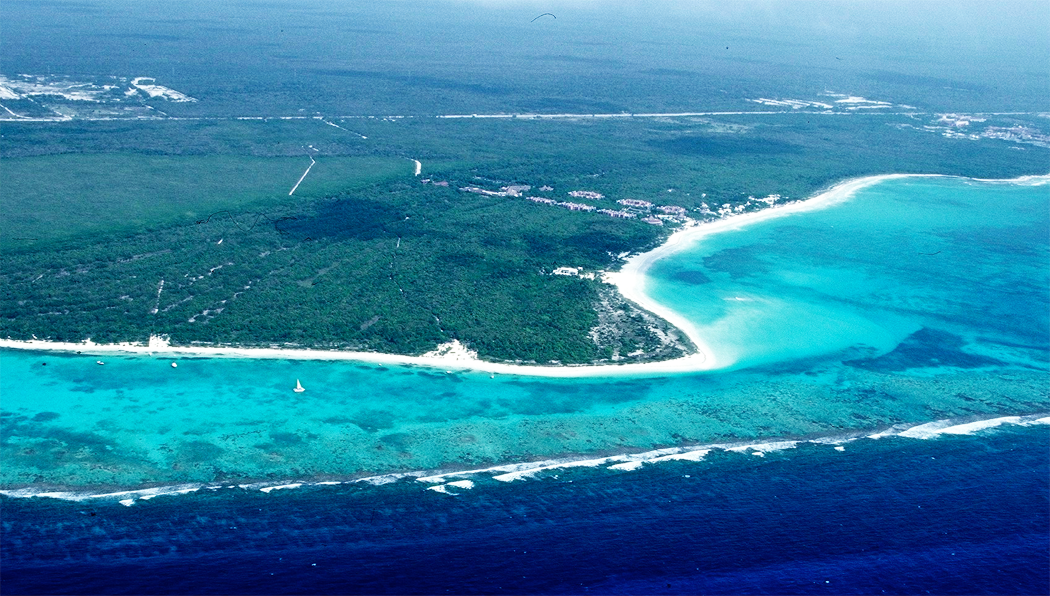
- View from helicopter

- Location in Mexico
- Coordinates: 20°43′49″N 86°57′54″W
- Country: Mexico
- State: Quintana Roo
- Municipality: Solidaridad
- Highest elevation: 7 m (23 ft)
- Lowest elevation: 0 m (0 ft)

Population (2010)
  - Total: 58
- Time zone: UTC-5 (EST)
- Postal code: 77710
- Area code: 998

Punta Maroma is a beach located in Mexico's easternmost state, Quintana Roo, on the Yucatán Peninsula. The beach of Punta Maroma faces the Caribbean Sea.

Punta Maroma beach is located in Solidaridad Municipality at 20°44′16″N 86°58′03″W. It is located inside the tourist district known as the Riviera Maya, along the coastal Highway 307 which parallels the Caribbean. It is 35.3 kilometres (21.9 mi) km from the Cancún International Airport (CUN) and about 10 kilometres (6.2 mi) northeast of Playa del Carmen. It had a population of 58 inhabitants during the 2010 census. Known for its white sand coastline and crystal-clear waters and its coral reef, that is part of the Mesoamerican Barrier Reef System, the second longest one in the world.

== History ==
Prior to the Europeans contact period that was brought about by Christopher Columbus finding the Americas, the area around Punta Maroma beach was inhabited by the Maya. Subsequent to contact most of the native population either died from diseases, including smallpox that had been introduced by the Spanish, in the 16th century Spanish conquest.

Up until modern times most of the landscape remained untouched well into the 1970s, the sole exception being a coconut plantation to the west of the beach. There was a jungle between the highway and the beach, so the only way to access the beach was by boat. Today the beach is still intact, and there are no resorts or hotels built on the strip of land. There are, however, resorts and hotels that use the name Maroma, but they are actually not located on the private beach attributed to the original Punta Maroma or 'Maroma Beach', but they are a short distance from it.

== Climate ==
Punta Maroma has a tropical climate, specifically a tropical wet and dry climate (Köppen Aw), with little temperature differences between seasons, but pronounced rainy seasons. The annual average temperature is about 27 °C or 80 °F. All year around the humidity level is very high, often around 90 per cent. From April to September the temperatures are 36 °C / 92 °F – 29 °C / 84 °F, October–March are 28 °C / 83 °F – 18 °C / 65 °F . The rainy season is from July to December.

Climate data for Punta Maroma
| Month | Jan | Feb | Mar | Apr | May | Jun | Jul | Aug | Sep | Oct | Nov | Dec | Year |
|---|---|---|---|---|---|---|---|---|---|---|---|---|---|
| Mean daily maximum °C (°F) | 27.9 (82.2) | 28.7 (83.7) | 29.9 (85.8) | 31.5 (88.7) | 32.7 (90.9) | 33.0 (91.4) | 33.4 (92.1) | 33.6 (92.5) | 32.7 (90.9) | 31.0 (87.8) | 29.6 (85.3) | 28.2 (82.8) | 31.0 (87.8) |
| Daily mean °C (°F) | 24.3 (75.7) | 24.7 (76.5) | 25.7 (78.3) | 27.5 (81.5) | 28.6 (83.5) | 29.1 (84.4) | 29.3 (84.7) | 29.2 (84.6) | 28.7 (83.7) | 27.4 (81.3) | 26.2 (79.2) | 24.7 (76.5) | 27.1 (80.8) |
| Mean daily minimum °C (°F) | 20.6 (69.1) | 20.7 (69.3) | 21.5 (70.7) | 23.4 (74.1) | 24.4 (75.9) | 25.2 (77.4) | 25.2 (77.4) | 24.8 (76.6) | 24.7 (76.5) | 23.8 (74.8) | 22.7 (72.9) | 21.2 (70.2) | 23.2 (73.8) |
| Average rainfall mm (inches) | 136.4 (5.37) | 45.7 (1.80) | 52.7 (2.07) | 37.9 (1.49) | 88.0 (3.46) | 137.5 (5.41) | 57.0 (2.24) | 109.5 (4.31) | 224.6 (8.84) | 221.1 (8.70) | 131.6 (5.18) | 95.7 (3.77) | 1,337.7 (52.67) |
| Average rainy days | 10.5 | 5.4 | 5.4 | 4.1 | 6.6 | 11.1 | 8.8 | 10.0 | 14.0 | 16.3 | 12.4 | 10.6 | 115.2 |
Source: Servicio Meteorologico Nacional
