= Westmont Hospitality Group =

Canadian hotel company

- Type: Private
- Industry: Hospitality
- Founded: 1975
- Founder: Mangalji family
- Headquarters: Mississauga, Ontario, Canada
- Area served: Worldwide
- Key people: Majid Mangalji (Chairman and CEO)
- Products: Hotel ownership, hotel management, asset management
- Website: www.whg.com

Westmont Hospitality Group is a company nominally based in Mississauga, Ontario, Canada, which owns and manages hotels. It was founded by the Mangalji family and is one of the biggest hospitality management companies. It currently is managed by Majid Mangalji.

The company has strategic alliances with Intercontinental Hotels (as Holiday Inn), Choice Hotels (as Comfort Inn and Quality Inn), Hilton Hotels, Radisson Hotels, and Wyndham Hotels & Resorts. It is the successor (through a 1999 corporate takeover) of the Journey's End Corporation, a Canadian hotel management and franchising company.

== History ==
In August 2022, together with Angelo Gordon, Westmont Hospitality Group acquired leading Spanish hotel group Room Mate.

=== Journey's End Corporation ===
In 1978, Maurice H. Rollins (of Rollins Construction, a builder and developer) and Joseph D. Basch of Belleville, Ontario, founded Journey's End Corporation to build new two-story hotels as standardised buildings with no on-site amenities. As newly constructed properties in locations reasonably near freeways and airports but often on crossroads without an existing hotel, these were initially priced to compete directly and aggressively against existing Canadian motels. At the time, motels typically were small independent properties built long before the 400-series highways and Quebec autoroutes and located on relatively inexpensive land along the old two-lane highways. The first motel opened in Belleville, Ontario and was followed by additional locations in Kingston, Peterborough, Cornwall, and Ottawa in succession, eventually expanding across Canada and the northeastern United States.

These properties were marketed as an alternative carefully positioned between more expensive (but full service) chain hotels of that era and the small, low-cost independent motels. The logo for the "Journey's End" brand was a sunset depicted on a black background. Rooms were comparable in quality to those of a good hotel, but there would be no pool, restaurant, bar, health club, meeting facilities or other on-site amenities. There would be no room service. Architectural designs were often generic and varied little from one city to another. In addition to motels, Journey's End also developed sub-brands; Journey's End Hotels, which were hi-rise versions of the motels often located in urban locations, and Journey's End Suites, their all-suite concept.

While the intended target market was "budget-minded business travellers looking for something between the full-service luxury hotels and the clean-but-plain roadside inns," subsequent market research indicated many clients were individuals travelling from small towns across Canada - a group which had traditionally supported small roadside motels. By the early 1990s, there were nearly 140 of these bare-bones hotels with a total of 12,000 rooms built with capital from more than 2,400 limited partners.

=== Unihost ===
Journey's End Corporation became a publicly held company in 1986, expanding its operations beyond the initial low-end "budget hotel" model by operating franchised Canadian hotel locations in higher-priced market segments on behalf of existing US chains such as Holiday Inn and Ramada.

On June 30, 1997, Journey's End Corporation (TSX: JEM) changed its corporate name to UniHost, retaining the original name solely for a "Journey's End Management" subsidiary dedicated to operating what were originally the Journey's End own-brand budget hotels (by then mostly re-branded "Comfort Inn by Journey's End").

UniHost Corporation was engaged in the ownership and leasing of hotels in Canada and was one of multiple companies to enter into a strategic alliance with Choice Hotels in 1997 as Journey's End hotels gradually became Comfort Inn (or, in some locations, Quality Inn).

=== W-Westmont Corporation ===
On May 21, 1999, the W-Westmont Corporation, a partnership that included Goldman Sachs and Company, purchased the Unihost Corporation of Canada for $7/share (or almost $265 million Canadian) in cash and took on about $300 million of Unihost debt. Unihost's board had rejected an earlier $6-a-share bid as too low.
