= List of hotels in Washington, D.C. =

List of notable current and former hotels in Washington, D.C.

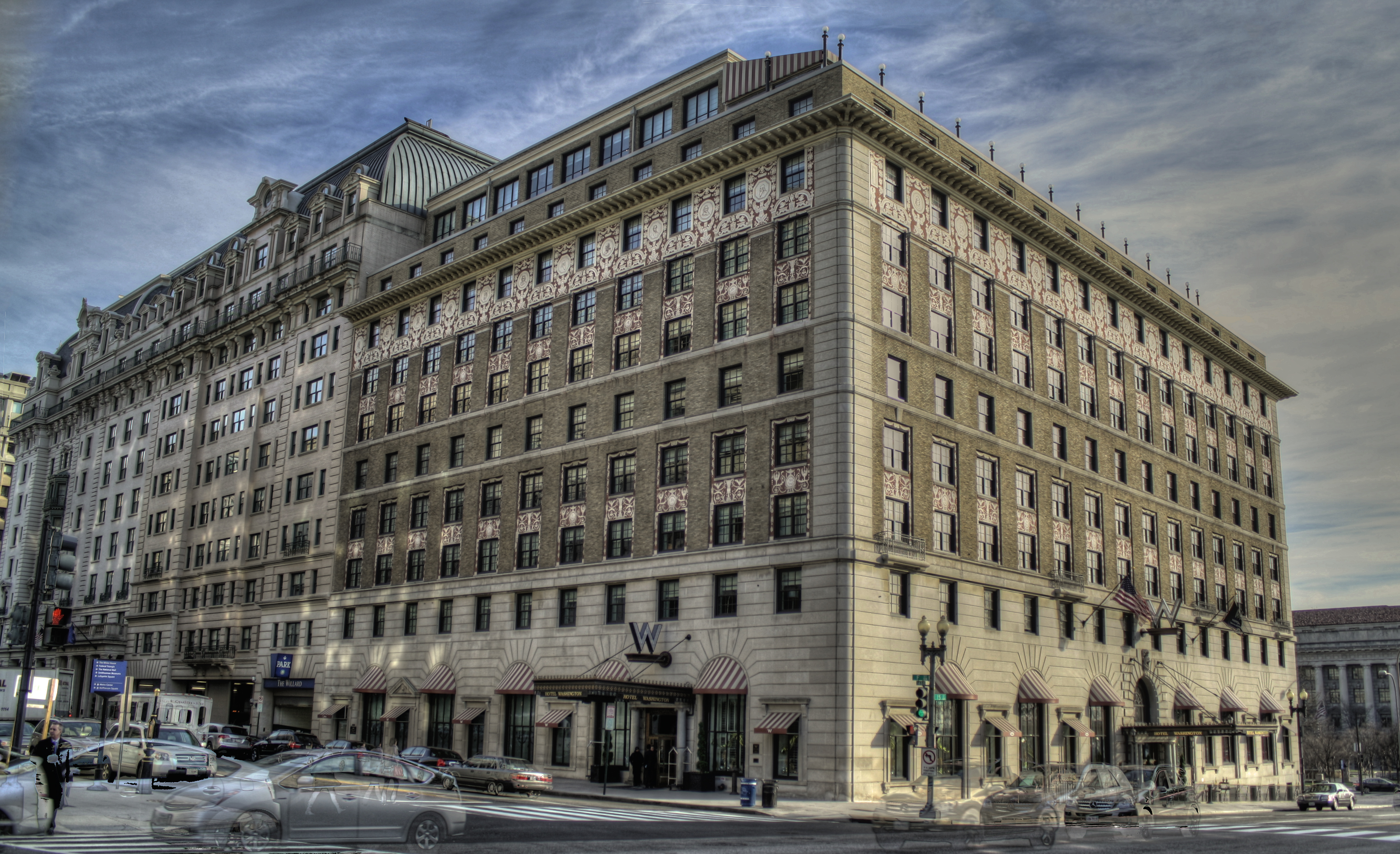
Hotel Washington

The following is a list of notable current and former hotels in Washington, D.C..

Entries in bold are listed on the National Register of Historic Places.

== Current hotels ==
Hotel	Rooms	First opened	Location	Added to NRHP	NRHP ref no.
Capital Hilton	544	1943	1001 16th Street NW	-	-
Churchill Hotel		1902 (Note: Originally opened as an apartment building)	1914 Connecticut Avenue NW	-	-
Conrad Washington	370	2019	950 New York Avenue NW	-	-
Courtyard Washington, DC Dupont Circle Hotel	143	1979 (Note: Current hotel occupying the building opened in 2021)	1733 N Street NW	-	-
The Dupont Circle Hotel	312	1947	1500 New Hampshire Avenue NW	-	-
The Fairmont Washington, D.C.	415	1985 (Note: Current hotel occupying the building opened in 2002)	2401 M Street NW	-	-
Four Seasons Hotel, Washington, D.C.		1979	2800 Pennsylvania Avenue NW	-	-
Embassy Suites by Hilton Washington DC Georgetown	318	1987	1250 22nd Street NW	-	-
Grand Hyatt Washington	897	1987	1000 H Street NW	-	-
**Hamilton Hotel**	320	1922	1001 14th Street NW	April 17, 2013	12001194
Hay–Adams Hotel	145	1928	800 16th Street NW	-	-
Henley Park Hotel	96	1982	926 Massachusetts Avenue NW		
Hilton Washington DC National Mall	367	1973	480 L'Enfant Plaza SW	-	-
**Hotel Washington**	317	1918	515 15th Street NW	March 30, 1995	95000352
Hotel Zena, a Viceroy Urban Retreat	193	1974 (Note: Current hotel occupying the building opened in 2020)	1155 14th Street NW	-	-
The Jefferson	99	1955	1200 16th Street NW	-	-
Kimpton Banneker Hotel	144	2001 (Note: Current hotel occupying the building opened in 2021)	1315 16th Street NW	-	-
Kimpton Hotel Monaco Washington DC	183	2002	700 F Street NW	-	-
The Madison Washington, D.C.	356	1963 (Note: Current hotel occupying the building opened in 2017)	1177 15th Street NW	-	-
Mandarin Oriental, Washington, D.C.	400	2004	1330 Maryland Avenue NW	-	-
The Mansion on O Street		1980	2020 O Street NW	-	-
**Mayflower Hotel**	581	1925	1127 Connecticut Avenue NW	November 14, 1983	83003527
Melrose Georgetown Hotel	240		2430 Pennsylvania Avenue NW	-	-
**Morrison and Clark Houses**		1865	1013–1015 L Street NW	March 19, 1991	90002149
Omni Shoreham Hotel		1930	2500 Calvert Street NW	-	-
Park Hyatt Washington	216	1986	1201 24th Street NW	-	-
Phoenix Park Hotel		1922	501 North Capitol Street	-	-
The Ritz-Carlton, Georgetown	118	2003	3100 South Street NW	-	-
The Ritz-Carlton, Washington, D.C.	299		1150 22nd Street NW"	-	-
Rosewood Washington, D.C.	39	1963 (Note: Current hotel occupying the building opened in 2016)	1050 31st Street NW"	-	-
Royal Sonesta Washington DC Dupont Circle	335	1967 (Note: Current hotel occupying the building opened in 2019)	2121 P Street NW	-	-
St. Gregory Hotel	155	2000	2033 M Street NW	-	-
**The St. Regis Washington, D.C.**		1926 (Note: Current hotel occupying the building opened in 1988)	923 16th Street NW	June 28, 1990	90000911
**Waldorf Astoria Washington DC**	261	2016	1100 Pennsylvania Avenue NW	April 11, 1973	73002105 (Note: NRHP listing of the Old Post Office and Clock Tower)
The Ven at Embassy Row Hotel	231	1970	2015 Massachusetts Avenue NW	-	-
**Watergate Hotel**	336	1967	2650 Virginia Avenue NW	October 12, 2005	05000540 (Note: NRHP listing of the Watergate complex)
Washington Hilton	1,070	1965	1919 Connecticut Avenue NW	-	-
The Westin Georgetown, Washington, D.C.	248	1984	2350 M Street NW	-	-
**Willard InterContinental Washington**		1901	1401–1409 Pennsylvania Avenue NW	74002177	February 15, 1974

== Former hotels ==
This includes buildings that no longer exist as a whole or no longer operate with or as a hotel.

Hotel	First opened	Closed	Location	Added to NRHP	NRHP ref no.
Arlington Hotel	1869	1912	810 Vermont Avenue NW (Note: Address of the United States Department of Veterans Affairs, former location of the Arlington Hotel)	-	-
Brickskeller	1957	2010	1523 22nd Street NW	-	-
The Fairfax at Embassy Row	1927	2021	2100 Massachusetts Avenue NW	-	-
**The Cairo**	1900	1972	1615 Q Street NW	September 9, 1994	94001033
Capitol Skyline Hotel	1962	2020	10 I Street SW	-	-
**City Tavern**	1796	1960	3206 M Street NW	January 17, 1992	91001489
**Marriott Wardman Park**	1918	2020	2600 Woodley Road NW	January 31, 1984	84000869
**Whitelaw Hotel**	1918	1977	1839 13th Street NW	July 14, 1993	93000595
Wormley's Hotel	1871	1906	1500 H Street NW	-	-
