= Hersha Hotels and Resorts =

Owner of hotels

- Type: Privately held company
- Industry: Real estate investment trust
- Founded: 1984; 42 years ago
- Founder: Hasu P. Shah
- Headquarters: Philadelphia, Pennsylvania
- Products: Hotels
- Owner: KSL Capital Partners
- Number of employees: 21
- Website: www.hersha.com

Hersha Hotels and Resorts, headquartered in Philadelphia, Pennsylvania, owns 18 hotels comprising 2,963 rooms. It is owned by KSL Capital Partners, a private equity firm. Notable hotels owned by the company are the St. Gregory Hotel and The Ritz-Carlton, Georgetown, both in Washington, DC.

== History ==
In January 1979, Indian-American immigrant Hasu P. Shah and his wife, Hersha, after whom the company was named, bought an 11-room motel near Harrisburg, Pennsylvania. Five years later, Hasu Shah formed the company and purchased a hotel in Harrisburg, Pennsylvania.

In January 1999, a year after being organized into a Maryland real estate investment trust, it became a public company via an initial public offering.

In May 2006, the firm acquired four Boston-area hotels for $44 million.

In June 2015, the company acquired the St. Gregory Hotel in Washington, D.C. for $57 million. The company acquired The Ritz-Carlton, Georgetown for $49.9 million in January 2016.

Hersha sold seven of its Manhattan hotels in February 2016 to a joint venture with Chinese company Cindat Capital Management.

In November 2023, private equity firm KSL Capital Partners acquired Hersha for $1.4 billion.
