= Morris Lapidus =

American architect

- Born: November 25, 1902; Odessa, Russian Empire
- Died: January 18, 2001 (aged 98); Miami Beach, Florida, United States
- Education: Columbia University (B.A., Architecture, 1927)
- Occupation: Architect
- Awards: In 2000, the Smithsonian's Cooper-Hewitt National Design Museum honored Lapidus as an American Original for his lifetime of work; cited in Syracuse University Special Collections, Morris Lapidus 2011
- Buildings: Fontainebleau Miami Beach; Eden Roc
- Projects: Lincoln Road Mall

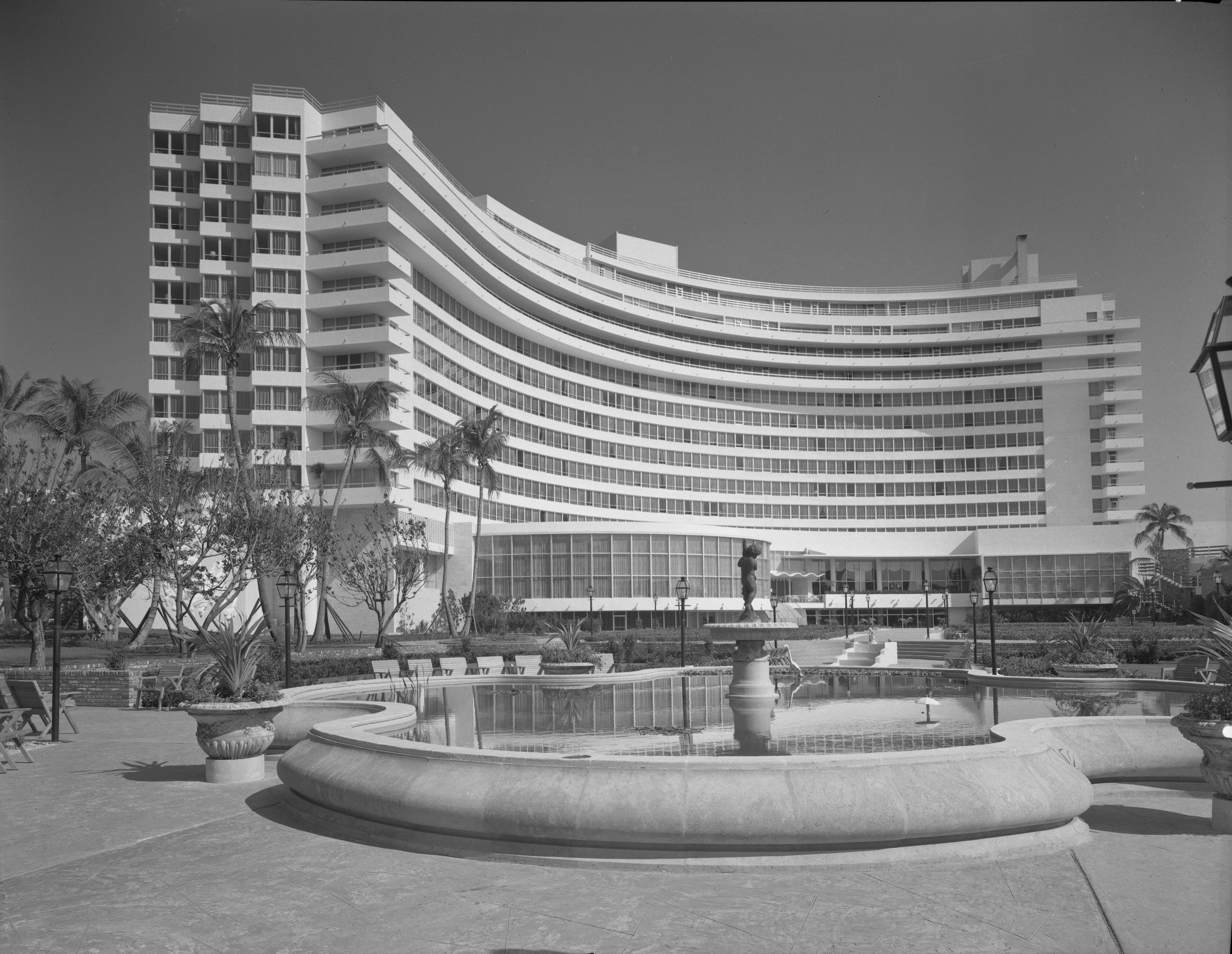
The Fontainebleau

Morris Lapidus (November 25, 1902 – January 18, 2001) was an architect, primarily known for his Neo-baroque "Miami Modern" hotels constructed in the 1950s and 60s, which have since come to define that era's resort-hotel style, synonymous with Miami and Miami Beach.

A Jewish Ukrainian immigrant based in New York, Lapidus designed over 1,000 buildings during a career spanning more than 50 years, much of it spent as an outsider to the American architectural establishment.

== Early life and career ==
Born in Odessa in the Russian Empire (now Ukraine), his Orthodox Jewish family fled Russian pogroms to New York when he was an infant. As a young man, Lapidus explored acting which led to his interest in theatrical set design where he was directed by scene painters to study architecture. He attended Columbia University, graduating in 1927. Lapidus worked for the prominent Beaux Arts firm of Warren and Wetmore. At that time his first project was to design a garage ornament for the Vanderbilt mansion. His design incorporated Mercury, the god of Speed, into a modern sculpture. Lapidus explained that the proposed "horse head and wagon was an anachronism." From 1929 to 1943 he worked with Ross-Frankel as a retail architect. When in early 1942 his father's company, U.S. Metals, employed Morris to design a Signaling Search Light, which had been commissioned by Admiral Rickover, he resigned from Ross-Frankel, but not before showing Evan Frankel the potato fields of The Hamptons, where they went to successfully field test the light.

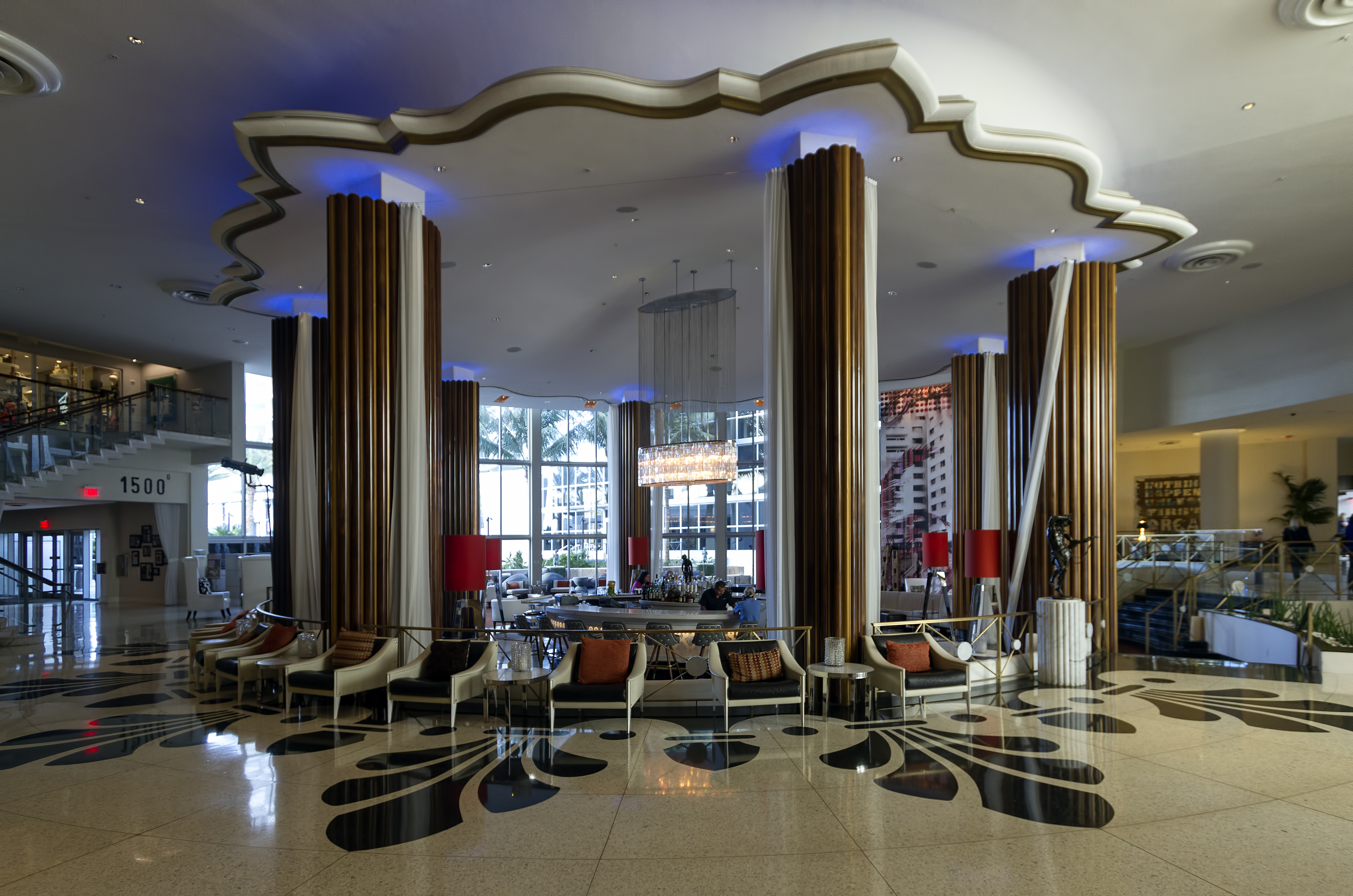
Eden Roc Miami Beach Hotel, interior

After this very successful 22-year career in retail interior design with Ross-Frankel, Lapidus was asked to be a "hotel doctor" on several Miami Hotels. He soon was the associate architect of five hotel projects in Miami Beach—Sans Souci Hotel 1947 (opened 1949, after 1996 called the RIU Florida Beach Hotel), followed closely by the Nautilus 1950, the diLido (1951), the Biltmore Terrace (1951), and the Algiers (1951), all along Collins Avenue, and amounting to the single-handed redesign of an entire district. The hotels were an immediate popular success and Lapidus began to push the boundaries of the hotel experience further.

Then in 1952 he landed the job of the largest luxury hotel in Miami Beach, the property he is most associated with, the Fontainebleau Hotel, which was a 1,200 room hotel built by Ben Novack on the former Firestone estate, and perhaps the most famous hotel in the world. It was followed the next year by the equally successful Eden Roc Hotel, (where Harry Belafonte broke the "color-line" at the Beach by staying the night there), and the Americana (later the Sheraton Bal Harbour) in 1956. The Sheraton was demolished by implosion shortly after dawn on Sunday, November 18, 2007 and is now a W Hotel The St. Regis at Bal Harbor. Using these hotels as his "laboratory for design" and exploring "how to sell a good time" Lapidus became famous for his Miami Beach hotels: the Fontainebleau (1954), the Eden Roc (1955), and the Americana (the Bal Harbor Sheraton) (1956). The opening of the Fontainebleau was shown on TV. American's watched as dancing people in ballroom upon ballroom streamed into their living rooms. In effect, Lapidus had out-palaced the palace and the modern era of the Miami Beach and her resort hotels began: everyone had to go.

In 1955, Lapidus designed the Ponce de Leon Shopping Center near the plaza in St. Augustine, Florida. The anchor store, Woolworth's, was the scene of the first sit-in by black demonstrators from Florida Memorial College in March, 1960, and in 1963 by four young teenagers, who came to be known as the "St. Augustine Four." The Woolworth's door-handles and a Freedom Trail marker memorialize the events.

Lapidus later worked with Igor Polevitsky on the addition to the Shellborne Hotel where as with earlier hotels, of the big eight. At all early hotels he gave Miami Beach's Collins Avenue its architectural style and made interesting nightscapes with his neon lettering; with the Venetian lettering for "diLido", the curving "S" at the Shellborne, or in the "ER" on the top rock at the Eden Roc. In the hotel interiors he anticipated post-modernism while serving up postcard views through modern glazing and decidedly modern exteriors. Lapidus's modern tropical style, continued in the housing projects which he completed all the way up the coast on Collins Avenue from 44th to 94th; the Seacoast East and West and the condominiums at Haulover Beach mark sensuous bookends to the sinuous ride on Florida's Millionaire Row on the Atlantic Ocean.

The Lapidus style is characterized by distinct visual elements derived from his early commercial store designs. His vocabulary included sweeping curves, backlit floating ceilings, 'beanpoles', and the ameboid shapes that he called 'woggles', 'cheeseholes'. He used color, signage, lights, mirrors, and techniques to visually float columns, and staircases designing meandering paths to guide movement through spaces.

His many smaller projects give Miami Beach's Collins Avenue its style, including the interesting lettering styles in neon at the "diLido" and the Shellborne anticipating post-modernism. Beyond visual style, there is some degree of functionalism at work. His curving walls caught the prevailing ocean breezes in the era before central air-conditioning, and the sequence of his interior spaces was the result of careful attention to user experience: Lapidis heard complaints of endless featureless hotel corridors and when possible curved his hallways to avoid that effect.

The Fontainebleau was built on the site of the Harvey Firestone estate and defined the new Gold Coast of Miami Beach. The hotel provided locations for the 1960 Jerry Lewis film The Bellboy, a success for both Lewis and Lapidus, and the James Bond thriller Goldfinger (1964); Whitney Houston was filmed there in The Body Guard (1992) and Madonna shot her CD photos for her Bedtime Stories 2005 album at the Eden Roc. The Fontainebleau's most famous feature is the 'Staircase to Nowhere' (formally called the "floating staircase"), which merely led to a mezzanine-level coat check and ladies' powder-room, but offered the opportunity to make a glittering descent into the hotel lobby. The planter under the stairway is all that is original today of the 1954 opening interiors.

My whole success is I've always been designing for people, first because I wanted to sell them merchandise. Then when I got into hotels, I had to rethink, what am I selling now? You're selling a good time.

From 1993-until 2001, in the period before his death, Lapidus' style came back into focus. Deborah Desilets, architect and artist, was Morris Lapidus's last collaborator. She first came into contact with Lapidus when she was the marketing director for Arquitectonica in 1993. By January 18, 1996, Desilets had left ARQ to found her own firm VVA INC, where she was able to work with Lapidus on a number of architectural projects, arrange his theoretical notes, stories and images for lectures, and explore product designs. Lapidus said, "I went from the Fontainebleau to a fountain pen!" In the same manner he helped with the Fontainebleau expansion by attending meetings with the Hilton and owner, Stephen H. Muss. Of the new design, Lapidus said that it was an "Exclamation Point" to his 1954 edifice and provide his prestige to help garner the new addition. Desilets and Lapidus were a team and this collaboration continued until his untimely death. Prior to this Lapidus bequeathed his name and legacy to Desilets'--in an unprecedented act in the annuals of architectural history—as a female collaborator. To secure his legacy, Desilets' gifted to Syracuse University Special Collections all the remaining Lapidus Papers; as Lapidus himself had sent papers to Syracuse in years prior. Following in his style, Desilets has produced furniture, rugs and mirrors with Dennis Miller and Associates, New York, NY from 2005 to 2018 under the Morris Lapidus trademark. Of the projects they collaborated on there were three projects for Roots of Canada; Roots, at The Promenade Mall Toronto, Roots in Bloomfield, IL and Roots in New York, NY. Of the several Miami projects, the first was for the ornament for a Spanish-Italianate style mansion on Sunset Island II; next the totally modern design in the colorfully, upbeat restaurant Aura at 603 Lincoln Road, on Miami Beach at the Lincoln Road Mall which appeared in the first color issue of the New York Times, Dec 23, 1999. Very soon after there was a total resurgence in Lapidus. He began to give lectures, make appearances and to make gifts of his vast collection of memorabilia: 100–150 year old books were donated to the School of Architecture at Florida International University, Miami, Florida new SOA campus was designed by Bernard Tschumi, Dean of Columbia; The Wolfsonian Museum, Miami Beach received slides of his design for the Distillery Building at the 1939 World's Fair; The Bass Museum received his living room furniture set; and Columbia received more papers. At numerous Miami Beach functions, Lapidus was honored for his help in the 1994–1996 renovation of Lincoln Road by Ben Wood of Wood and Thompson. Lapidus did not live to see a Frank Gehry, Saha Hadid or Herzog and De Meuron building, or Ray Jungle's "jungle on the mall", but his expression regarding Lincoln Road fits: "Why be exotic in Private?".

Lapidus and Desilets appeared on CNN discussing a project for Ron Bloomberg on 21st Street; a very modern building that housed production staff for the Miami Beach Ballet (MBB), who had their new headquarters next to the Bloomberg site. The MBB Arquitectonica in their tropical modernism style. ( Of note is that Laurinda Spear interned with Lapidus in the 70's and later introduced Desilets' to Lapidus while at a critique of the University of Miami student work at ARQ's office. Desilets' worked at ARQ and established the computer lab and then became the Director of Marketing which she left to pursue her work with Lapidus.) Lapidus was also honored by the Society of Architectural Historians at a convention held at the Eden Roc hotel in 1998. Lapidus had a plaque erected in his honor on Lincoln Road at "The Clam" Bandshell at Euclid, quoting him "A car never bought anything." At a lecture at Harvard Dean Silvetti asked, "Who's Afraid of Lapidus? That for 50 years his architecture was not published in magazines ...". In 2000, the Smithsonian's Cooper-Hewitt National Design Museum honored Lapidus as an American Original for his lifetime of work, he was interviewed on Nov 14, 200 by Charlie Rose. During his last years he was accompanied and/or stood in for by Desilets' at lectures all over America; Cranbrook, Harvard, New York Architectural League, Corcoran Gallery, Columbia University, SOA Ruston, Austin, Texas, LA and others. Desilets continue this work to date.

After all this renewed interest, Lapidus was quoted saying, "I never thought I would live to see the day when, suddenly, magazines are writing about me, newspapers are writing about me!" And indeed the people—his client's client—were clapping for him at the Cooper-Hewitt party when Lapidus exclaimed; debunking the Bauhaus's "form follows function" with "feelings find form."

== Personal ==
Desilets" authored Rizzoli's "Morris Lapidus: The Architecture of Joy", released in October 2010. Prior to that, Assouline published with Desilets three books: "Morris Lapidus" 2004; "The Eden Roc 50th Anniversary" 2005; and "The DiLido" 2006.

His son, architect Alan Lapidus, who worked with his father for 18 years, said, "His theory was if you create the stage setting and it's grand, everyone who enters will play their part."

In 2001, Morris Lapidus died from heart failure at the age of 98 at his Miami Beach apartment. Morris Lapidus' wife of 63 years, Beatrice, had died in 1992.

== Critical reception ==
Lapidus designed 1,200 buildings, including 250 hotels worldwide. The American architectural establishment regarded Lapidus as an outsider, tried to ignore his work, then characterized it as gaudy kitsch. Ada Louise Huxtable, writing in the New York Times, said of the Americana, "The effect on arrival was like being hit by an exploding gilded eggplant." This abusive critical reception perhaps culminated in a 1963 American Institute of Architects (AIA) meeting held at the Americana, where a variety of well-known architects including Paul Rudolph, Robert Anshen and Wallace Harrison took Lapidus to task for what they described as vulgarity, cheapness, and incompetence.

A 1970 Architectural League exhibit in New York began the serious appraisal of his work. Lapidus tried to ignore the critical panning, but it had an effect on his career and reputation. He burned 50 years' worth of his drawings when he retired in 1984 and remained personally bitter about some aspects of his career. Several unbuilt Lapidus hotels were donated to Desilets' by Don Seidler, who was Lapidus's production man for more than thirty years. Lapidus's unbuilt projects are the focus of Desilets' new book, "Too Much To Be BUILT: Morris Lapidus". Lapidus was rediscovered in his autobiography Too Much is Never Enough, 1996, which is an answer to Ludwig Mies van der Rohe's dictum 'Less is more.' According to his German biographer Martina Duttmann, he has always been more highly regarded in Europe than in the U.S., where the comparable jet-set futurism is designated "Googie". Today, books published by the AIA such as Architect's Essentials of Starting a Design Firm 2003, refer positively to Morris Lapidus' works.

== Projects ==
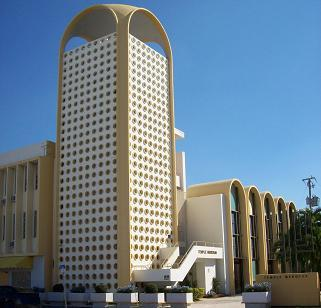
Temple Menorah in Miami Beach

List adapted from Works in Lapidus autobiography.

- Martin's Department Store, Brooklyn, New York 1944
- Bond Clothing Stores flagship store, 372 Fifth Avenue, New York, New York, 1948
- Grossinger's Catskill Resort Hotel, multiple buildings from 1949 (demolished)
- Hewlett-East Rockaway Jewish Centre, East Rockaway, New York, 1951
- Ainsley Building / Foremost Building / One Flager, Miami, Florida, 1952
- Fontainebleau Hotel, Miami Beach, Florida, 1954
- Ponce de Leon Shopping Center, St. Augustine, Florida, 1955
- Eden Roc Miami Beach Hotel, Miami Beach, Florida, 1955
- Aruba Hotel, now Hilton Aruba Caribbean Resort & Casino, Aruba, 1955
- Americana of Bal Harbour Hotel, Miami Beach, Florida, 1956, demolished 2007
- Deauville Resort, Miami Beach, Florida, 1950s
- Concord Resort Hotel, Catskills, New York, Imperial Room night club and multiple other projects from the mid-1950s (demolished)
- Golden Triangle Motor Hotel, Norfolk, Virginia 1959–60; interiors only
- Lincoln Road, Miami Beach, Florida, 1960
- Sheraton Motor Inn, now Chinese Consulate, New York, New York, 1959
- The Summit Hotel (later a DoubleTree Hotel and a dormitory), 569 Lexington Avenue, New York, New York, 1960
- Ponce de Leon Hotel, later Hilton San Jeronimo Hotel, now The Condado Plaza Hilton, San Juan, 1960
- Congregation Shaare Zion, Brooklyn, New York, 1960
- Richmond Motel, Richmond, Virginia, 1961
- The Americana of New York Hotel, now Sheraton New York Times Square Hotel, New York, New York, 1961
- The Americana of San Juan Hotel, now InterContinental San Juan, San Juan, 1961
- International Inn, now Washington Plaza Hotel, Washington, D.C., 1962
- Capitol Skyline Hotel, Washington, D.C., 1962 (demolished 2026)
- Temple Menorah, Miami Beach, Florida, 1962 (since remodeled)
- 1800 G Street NW, Washington, D.C., 1962
- Crystal House Condominium, 5055 Collins Avenue, Miami Beach, FL, 1962
- El Conquistador Resort, Fajardo, Puerto Rico, 1965
- Seacoast 5151, Miami Beach, Florida, 1966
- Oceanside Plaza, 5555 Collins Avenue, Miami Beach, Florida, 1967
- Temple Judea, 5500 Granada Boulevard, Coral Gables, Florida, 1966
- 1100 L Street NW, Washington, D.C., 1967
- Portman Square Hotel, London, England 1967
- Royal Embassy Condominium, 5750 Collins Avenue, Miami Beach, FL 1968
- Whitman (Co-op apartments) 75 Henry Street, Brooklyn, New York, 1968
- 1425 K Street NW, Washington, D.C., 1970 (since remodeled)
- Parker Plaza Estates, 2030 South Ocean Drive, Hallandale Beach, FL 33009
- Bonavida Condominium, 20100 West Country Club Drive, Aventura, FL, 1974
- TSS Mardi Gras, 1975
- TSS Carnivale, 1975
- Carnival Cruise Lines Terminal Building, Port of Miami, Miami, Florida, 1975
- 100 Bayview Drive, Sunny Isles Beach, 1975
- Lausanne Apartments, Naples, Florida, 1978
- Grandview at Emerald Hills, Hollywood, Florida, 1981
- The Tropicana, Sunny Isles Beach, Florida, 1984
- Magram's Fashion Shop, Burlington, VT, 1955
- 5600 Condominium, Collins Ave, Miami Beach, Florida, 1967
- 3 Island Avenue, Miami Beach, Florida, 1962
