= Capella Bangkok =

Hotel in Bangkok, Thailand

Capella Bangkok is a luxury hotel managed by Capella Hotels and Resorts in Bangkok, Thailand. It is situated on the Chao Phraya River in Yan Nawa subdistrict, Sathon district, sharing the same campus and ownership as the Four Seasons Hotel Bangkok.

The Capella Bangkok opened in 2020. In 2024, it was ranked first in The World's 50 Best Hotels list published by William Reed. The hotel has 101 rooms, and its riverside villas have private gardens and plunge pools.
