= West End (Washington, D.C.) =

Neighborhood in Washington, D.C., United States

- Neighborhood of Washington, D.C.
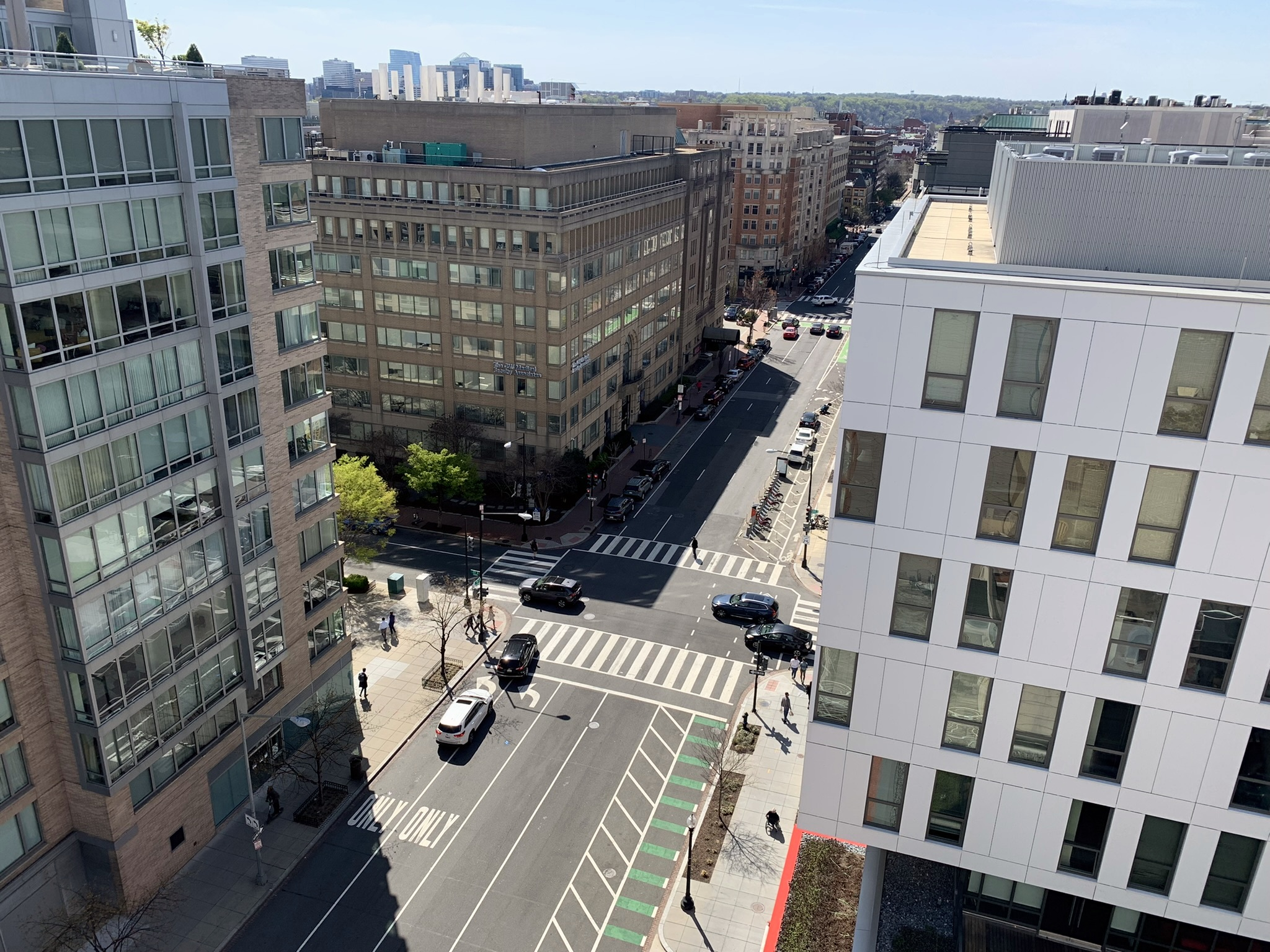
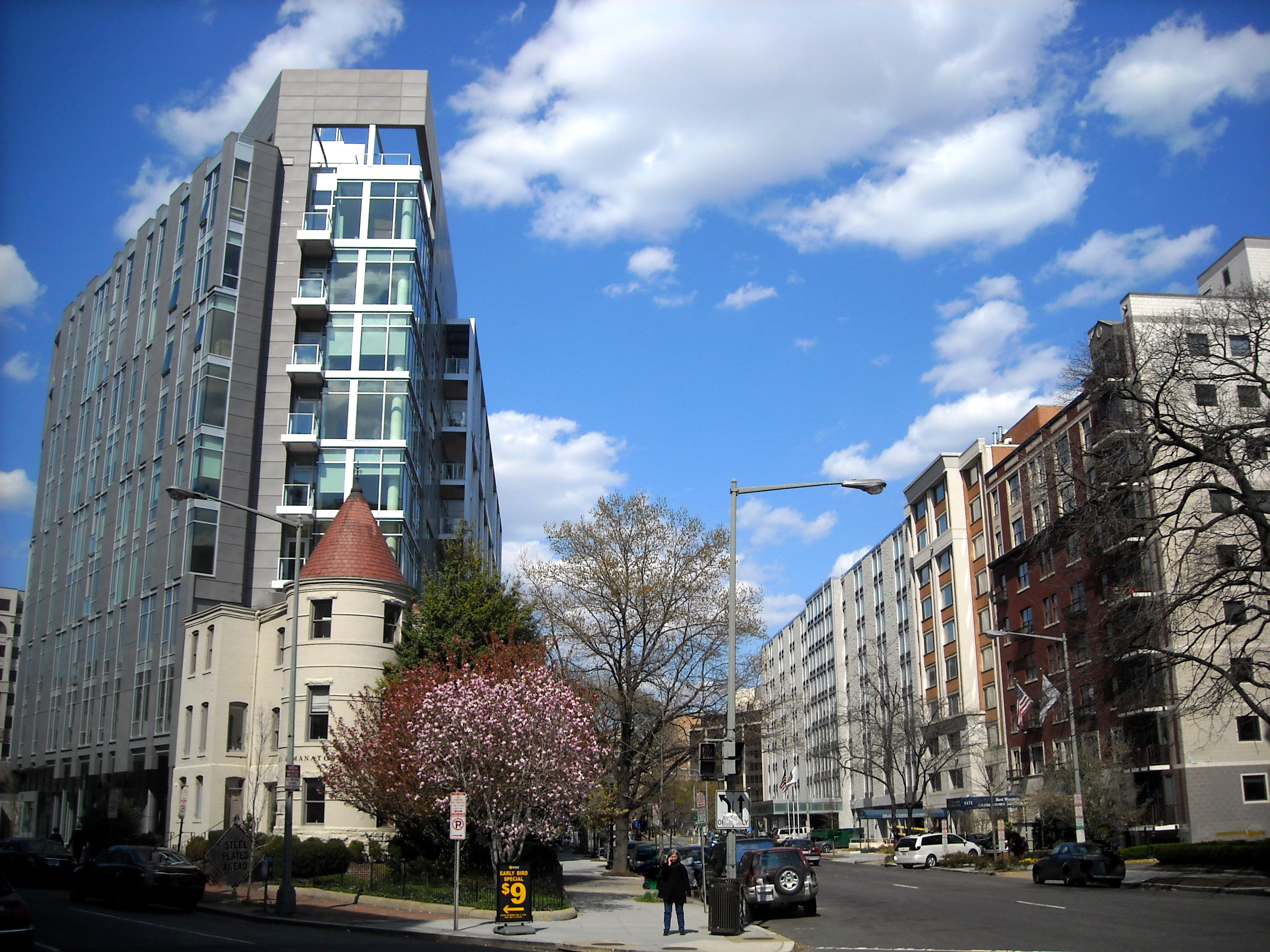
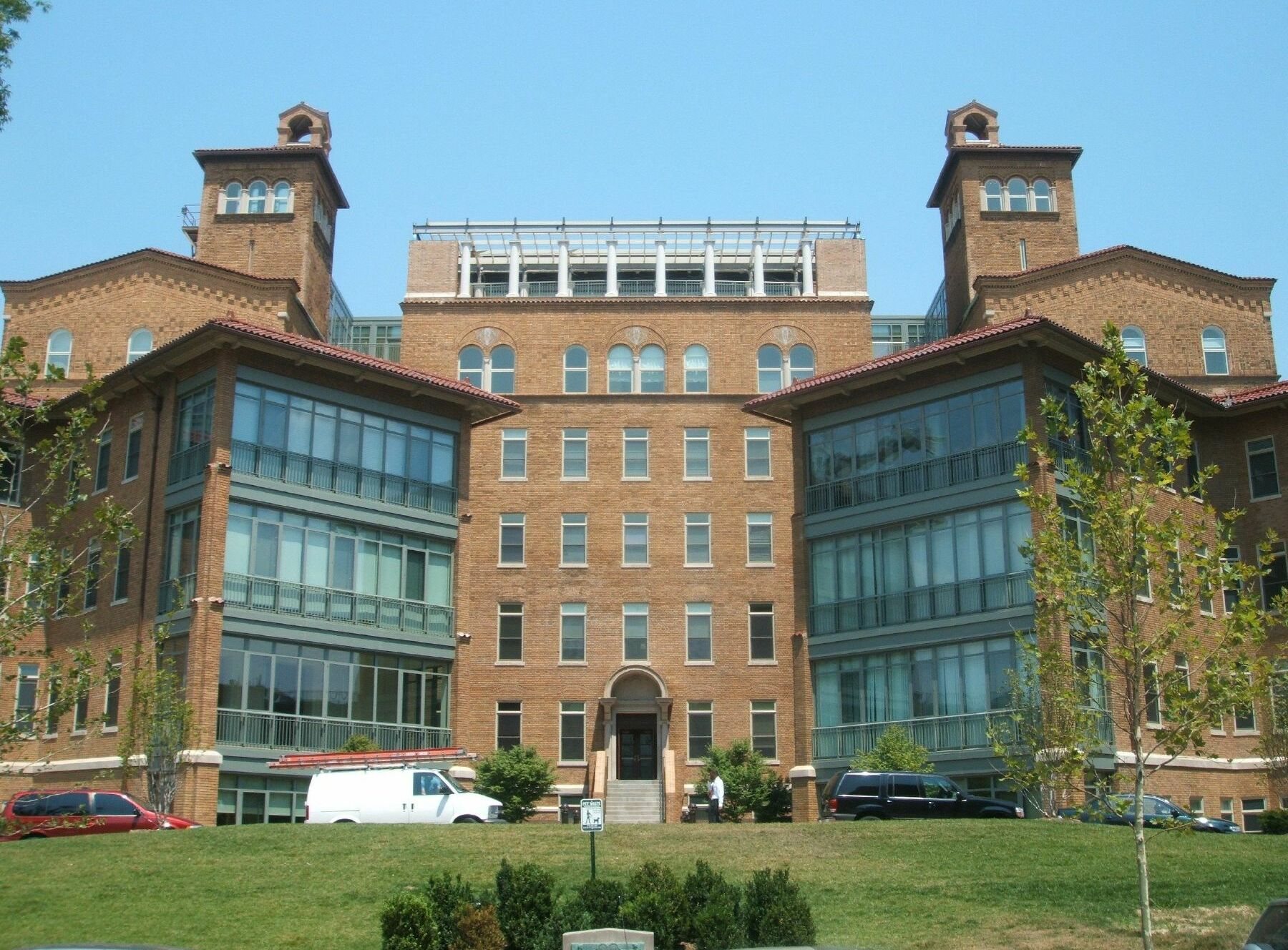
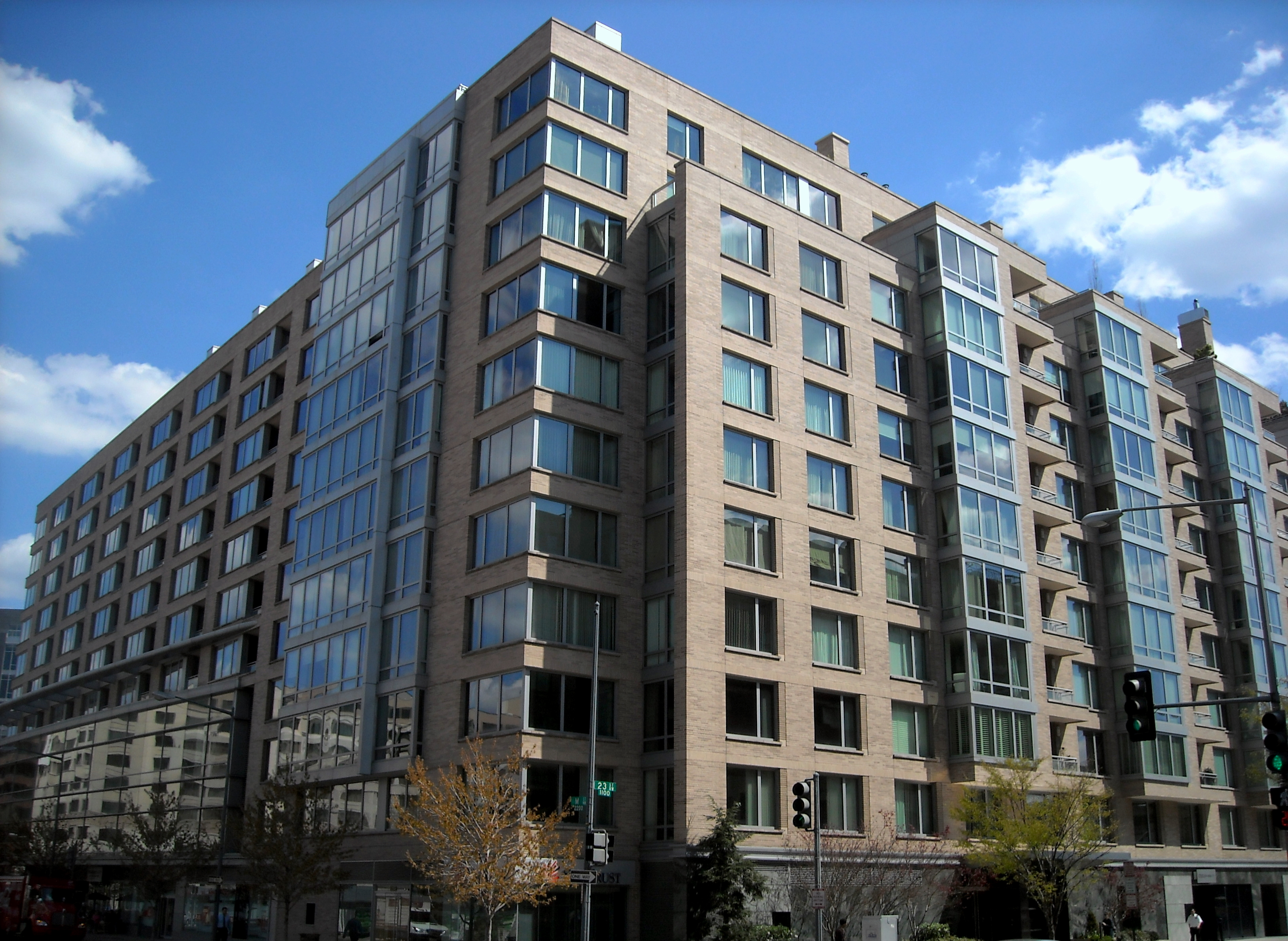
- Top: M Street (left) and New Hampshire Avenue (right); bottom: Columbia Hospital for Women (left) and The Ritz-Carlton, Washington, D.C. (right)

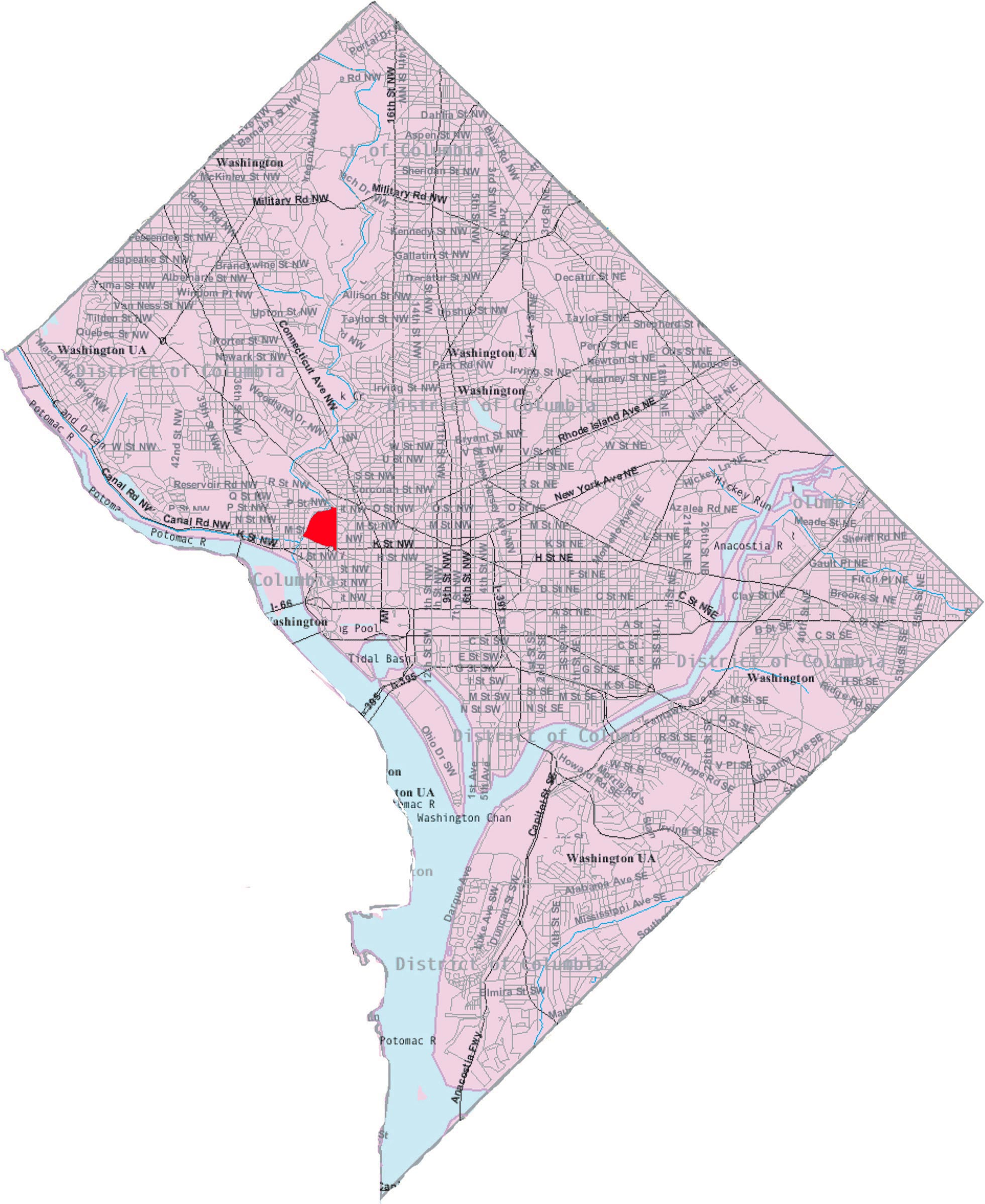
- Map of Washington, D.C., with West End highlighted in red
- Coordinates: 38.907056°N 77.049694°W
- Country: United States
- District: Washington, D.C.
- Quadrant: Northwest
- Ward: 2

Government
  - Councilmember: Brooke Pinto
- Postal code: ZIP code

The West End is a neighborhood in the Northwest quadrant of Washington, D.C., bounded by K Street NW to the south, Rock Creek Park to the west and north, and New Hampshire Avenue NW and 23rd Street NW to the east. The West End is so named because it was the westernmost part of the original L'Enfant Plan for the city of Washington, before the annexation of Georgetown. It is home to the embassies of Spain and Qatar as well as the Delegation of the European Union to the United States. The George Washington University and George Washington University Hospital are on the edge of the West End, at Washington Circle.

The West End is home to numerous luxury hotels, upscale condominiums, and fine dining restaurants. The neighborhood exists due in large part to a 1972 urban renewal plan prepared by the city's Office of Planning and Management, designed "to bring life to a declining part of the city." Titled "New Town for the West End," the aerial photograph on the cover of the study showed the area that was planned to become a "new intown community."

The neighborhood is adjacent to Georgetown, Foggy Bottom, Dupont Circle, and the city's traditional Downtown. Today, DC Planning Office considers the West End part of a more broadly-defined Downtown.

== History ==
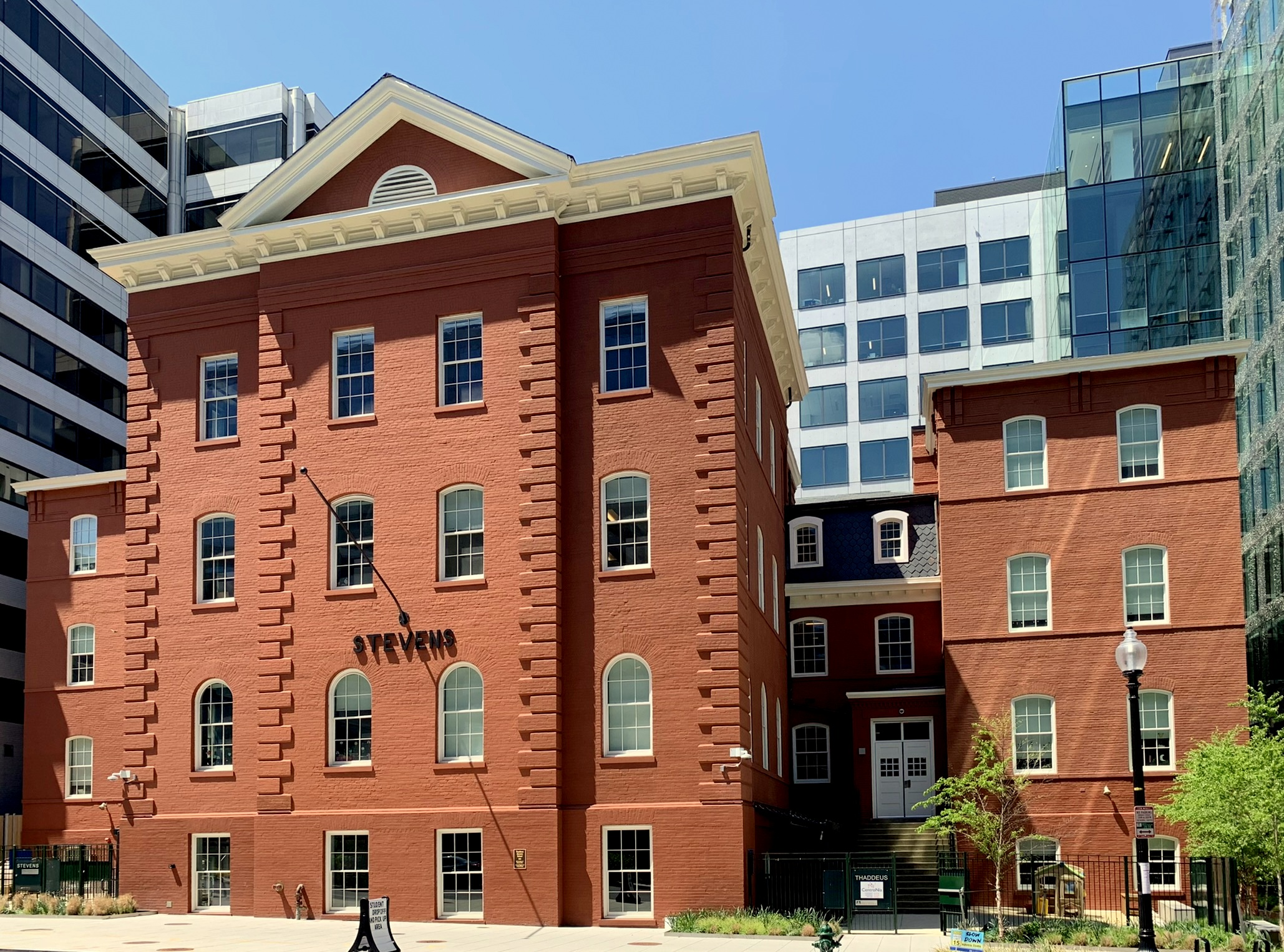
Thaddeus Stevens School

Historically, West End was a predominantly African American community with brick Victorian rowhouses and warehouses.

Jazz pianist and composer Duke Ellington was born in the neighborhood in 1899.

== Recent developments ==
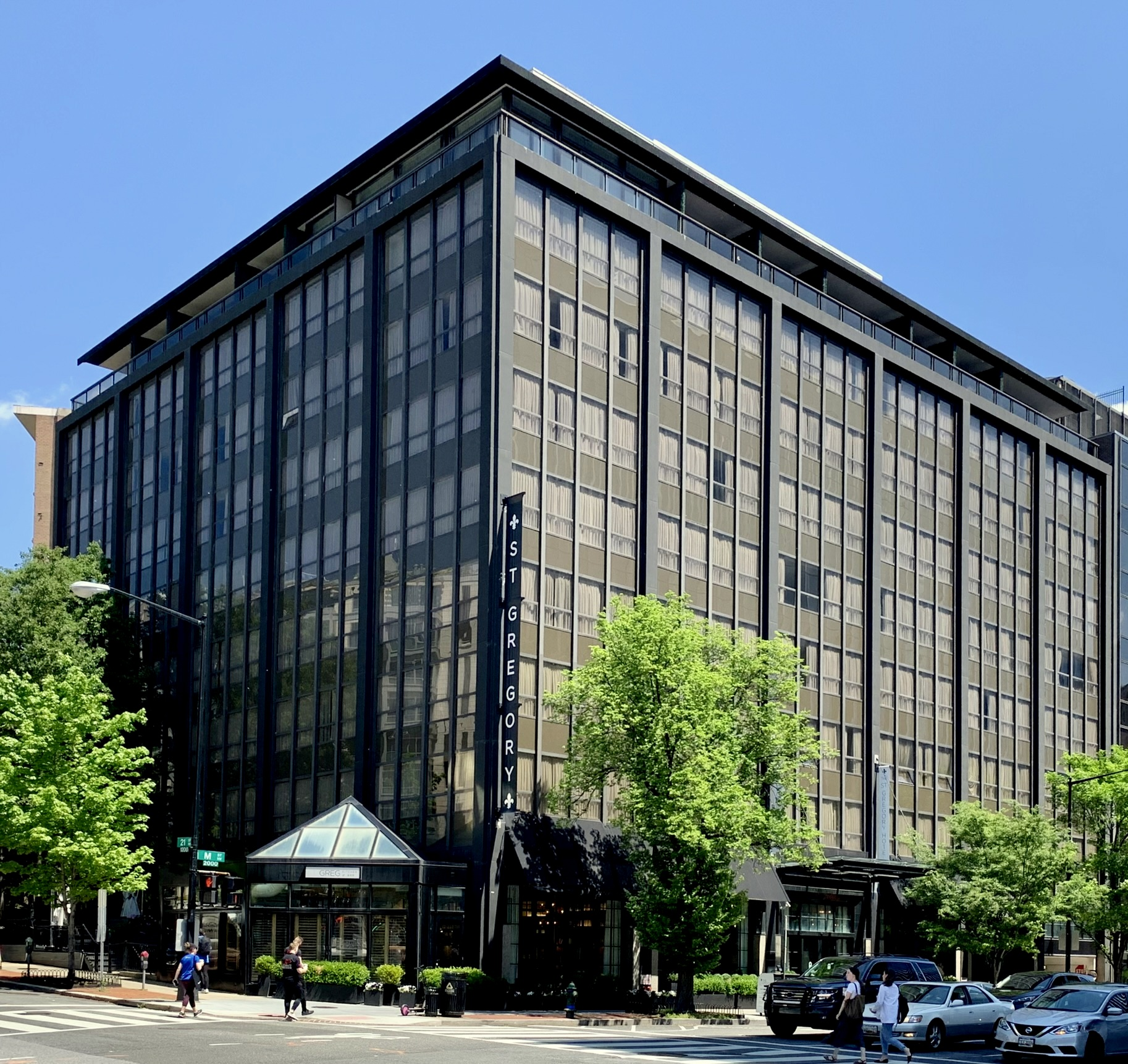
St. Gregory Hotel

The West End has been a hotbed of development, with hundreds of new luxury condominiums either under construction or in the planning phase.

In 2007, controversy began over the last remaining "underdeveloped" parcel of land, known as Square 37. Bordered by 23rd Street, 24th Street, L Street, and an alleyway, this anomaly, composed of low-rise buildings from the 1800s to the 1960s, stands out amid a sea of new luxury highrises. Square 37 was home to the Tiverton, the last remaining rent-controlled apartment building in the West End. The Tiverton tenants gained local media attention for successfully battling two upzoning attempts by developers in an effort to maintain the square as-is. Trader Joe's grocery store opened in the neighborhood in September 2006, next to the former Columbia Hospital for Women, now a luxury condominium.

The D.C. Council passed controversial emergency legislation in 2007 to sell the West End public library branch, the D.C. Special Operations Police Station (both on Square 37), and a firehouse (on neighboring Square 50) to the developer Eastbanc. A new West End Neighborhood Library opened in 2017.

== Education ==
District of Columbia Public Schools operates John Francis Education Campus at 2425 N Street.
