= Rosewood Washington, D.C. =

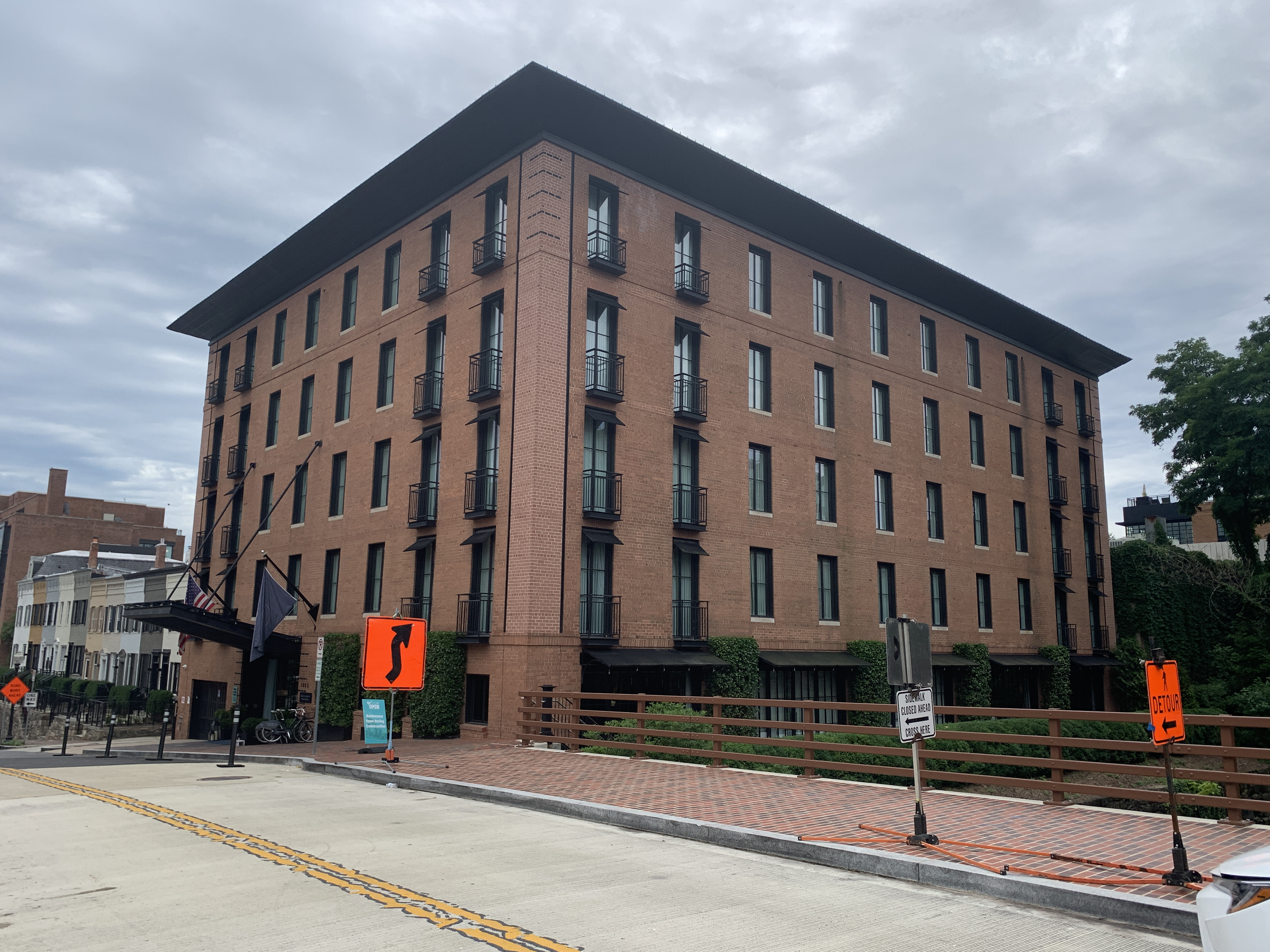
- Hotel chain: Rosewood Hotels & Resorts

General information
- Location: United States, 1050 31st Street NW, Washington, D.C.
- Coordinates: 38.904004°N 77.061473°W
- Opening: August 1963 (Canal Building); 2013 (Cappella Hotel); 2016 (Rosewood)
- Cost: $18.3 million (2008 building sale); $50 million (2012 renovation); $65 million (2016 sale)
- Owner: CTF Georgetown Hotel LLC
- Operator: Rosewood Hotels & Resorts

Technical details
- Floor count: 5

Design and construction
- Architects: Vlastimil Koubek (Canal Building); Winstanley Architects & Planners/Peter Silling & Associates (Capella Hotel)
- Developer: Henry Kaufman, Maury Young, Eugene Young, Jr., Robert Young (Canal Building); ICG Properties, Castleton Holdings, Point Ford Management (Cappella Hotel)

Other information
- Number of rooms: 37 (not including suites)
- Number of suites: 12
- Number of restaurants: 1
- Parking: 50

Website
- rosewoodhotels.com

Rosewood Washington, D.C. is a luxury boutique hotel located at 1050 31st Street NW in the Georgetown neighborhood of Washington, D.C., in the United States. Originally an office building known as the Canal Building, it was constructed in 1963, and was the first major new building constructed in Georgetown in 50 years. The structure was purchased by two local real estate development companies in 2008 and converted to a hotel. The renovation won multiple awards. The hotel, branded as and managed by Capella Hotels and Resorts, opened in 2013 as the Cappella Hotel. The developers sold the property to Rosewood Hotels & Resorts, which rebranded the hotel as the Rosewood Washington, D.C., in 2016.

The hotel has 55 accommodations in total, including 6 townhouses, 12 suites and 37 standard guest rooms. The hotel has about 42,000 square feet (3,900 m^{2}) of interior space.

== Construction of the building and early use ==
In 1961, D.C.-area advertising executive Henry Kaufman and local insurance company executives Maury Young, Eugene Young, Jr., and Dr. Robert Young purchased a vacant lot at 1050 31st Street NW in the Georgetown neighborhood of Washington, D.C. They hired local architect Vlastimil Koubek to design a five-story office building to house their businesses. Koubek initially proposed a Modernist building with an all-glass first floor and exposed stone upper floors. The District of Columbia Zoning Commission approved the design, but the United States Commission of Fine Arts—which had approval authority over construction in the area under authority granted to it by the Old Georgetown Act—rejected the design as too modern. By early summer 1962, Koubek had revised his design. The structure was now a spare, Federalist-style red brick building with small windows. The Commission of Fine Arts approved this design, but the Zoning Commission did not after arguing that Koubek's second effort was too far removed from the design they had originally approved. The zoning board also was unhappy with the way Koubek intended to conceal the mechanical and HVAC equipment on the roof.

Koubek eventually won approval from the zoning commission, and construction began in March 1963. The building was a "first" in several ways: It was the first non-Modernist structure Koubek ever designed, it was the first major new building constructed in Georgetown in the past 50 years, and it was the first new office building constructed in Georgetown in 100 years.

Named the Canal Building, the structure was erected by the George A. Fuller Company and had 36,000 square feet (3,300 m^{2}) of usable interior space. It also had three underground parking levels which could accommodate 50 vehicles. The structure, which was freestanding, had windows and views on all four sides, and about 4,400 square feet (410 m^{2}) of the lot in back of the building fronted on the Chesapeake & Ohio Canal.

The building was first occupied in August 1963. The Young & Simon, Inc. insurance firm occupied one floor, and the Henry J. Kaufman & Associates advertising agency occupied another floor (expanding to two floors in 1967).

In 1977, the Association of Trial Lawyers of America (ATLA) purchased the structure and moved its headquarters from Boston, Massachusetts, to Washington, D.C. The ATLA rededicated the building under the name "Leonard M. Ring Law Center". In 2007, the ATLA purchased a new building at 777 Sixth Street NW for $105 million, and vacated the building.

== Cappella Hotel ==
=== Acquisition and renovation ===
In January 2008, a local D.C. real estate development company, Castleton Holdings Inc., purchased the Canal Building for $18.3 million ($27,365,147 in 2025 dollars). About January 2009, another local real estate development firm, ICG Properties LLC, took a 50 percent equity investment in the property.

By April 2009, Castleton and ICG were in talks with a "high-end, boutique [hotel] operator" as a tenant in the building. In March 2010, the other party was revealed to be Capella Hotels and Resorts, the owner and operator of luxury boutique hotels in New York City, Japan, Mexico, Russia, and Thailand. The three companies tentatively announced they would renovate the building into a 48-room hotel beginning in 2011. The D.C. hotel would become the chain's flagship hotel. Obtaining financing during the Great Recession proved difficult. Castleton and ICG took on a third equal equity partner, the Indonesian investment firm Point Ford Management Ltd., which provided part of the $45 million ($64,404,586 in 2025 dollars) in financing needed for the renovation. (The deal was Point Ford's first American hotel investment.) The remainder of the financing came from PNC Financial Services.

The renovation plans drawn up by the architectural firms of Winstanley Architects & Planners and Peter Silling & Associates called for 12 suites and 27 standard guest rooms. Each guest room featured trayed ceilings, (Note: A trayed ceiling is a ceiling which resembles an inverted deep tray. They are usually used to hide recessed lighting.) cove lighting, millwork manufactured in Europe, hardwood parquet flooring from a demolished French château, and laser-cut marble sinks, tiles, and decorative work. Each suite also had a fireplace. Each guest room was unique, with its own color and design scheme and unique furnishings (designed by Silling & Associates). Furnishings in each room included one-of-a-kind artworks; silk curtains; custom, hand-upholstered furniture; and glass-enclosed rainfall showers. (Note: A rainfall shower is a type of shower where a large showerhead is placed in the ceiling directly above the bather. Water issues from the showerhead in imitation of rainfall—either by being pushed from the showerhead at moderate to low pressure, or by the effect of gravity.) Each guest room contained a television, but in suites these were mirror TVs. Anticipated hotel amenities included an indoor bar, rooftop cocktail lounge, fitness center, "signature" restaurant, outdoor dining area along the canal, spa, indoor and outdoor swimming pool, and wine cellar with attached wine bar. The lobby of the hotel could be accessed only by an electronic key. The lobby was designed to look like the living room of a wealthy home, with built-in bookshelves, chandelier, and floor-to-ceiling fireplace.

Initially, the hotel was due to deliver in the fall of 2012 in order to be available for the second inauguration of Barack Obama, but did not. In December 2012, the developers expected the hotel to open in February 2013, but missed this target date as well. The hotel's $50 million ($69,107,143 in 2025 dollars) renovation was finally completed in March 2013. (Note: The Washington Business Journal later pegged the cost of the renovation much lower, at just $32 million, in April 2016.) The Washington Business Journal cited the renovation as its "Best Deal: Rehab/Reuse" for 2013. The Washington Chapter of the American Institute of Architects gave the project its Award of Merit. The project also received the Award of Merit – Best Renovation/Adaptive Re-use from the Maryland/DC Chapter of the National Association of Industrial and Office Properties, the Award of Merit – Commercial/Residential Renovation (More Than $4 Million) from the Metro Washington Chapter of the American Building College, and the Excellence in Craftsmanship Award for Lighting Systems and the Star Award for Excellence in the Face of Adversity from the Washington Building Congress.

The property was assessed at about $31 million ($42,846,429 in 2025 dollars) after the renovation.

=== Operation ===
Room rates at the Capella Hotel were about $600 ($829 in 2025 dollars) a night in 2013.

The hotel won some early high praise. CNN called it one of 2013's hottest new hotels and Forbes Life magazine placed it in its list of the top 20 hotel properties in the United States.

However, the Capella Hotel struggled in its first year of operation. Unable to open by the 2013 presidential inauguration, the hotel missed an opportunity to introduce itself to many luxury travelers. Occupancy rates in the months following the hotel's opening averaged between 30 and 50 percent, although they later rose to 80 percent by May 2014. Management felt the hotel was still three months behind in meeting its targets as summer 2014 approached. The hotel also failed to generate much local buzz, and began opening its doors to the public for limited events (such as trunk shows and cocktail mixing classes) and giving the public access to its formerly-exclusive rooftop lounge. Without a ballroom or meeting space, the hotel also could not attract large numbers of travelers who might give the hotel excellent word-of-mouth.

The AAA gave Cappella Hotel four diamonds out of five in 2014. The hotel retained that rating in 2015. But Forbes Travel Guide (formerly known as the Mobil Guide) declined to give the hotel either four or five stars in 2015, and did not add it to its "recommended" list.

The hotel was asset managed by HVS between 2013 and 2016, prior to its record breaking sale.

== Rosewood ==
In March 2016, after three years in operation, Castleton Holdings and ICG Properties agreed to sell their interest in the hotel building to CTF Georgetown Hotel LLC, an affiliate of Hong Kong–based CTF Development Inc. The hotel sold for an "astounding" $65 million ($87,198,419 in 2025 dollars), or $1.3 million ($1,743,968 in 2025 dollars) per guest room. This was nearly three-and-a-half times the per-guest room price of The Ritz-Carlton, Georgetown (which sold in December 2015 for $32.5 million ($43,599,210 in 2025 dollars)), almost five-and-a-half times the per-guest room price of the Washington Marriott Georgetown (which sold in September 2015 for $113 million ($151,591,098 in 2025 dollars)), and more than two-and-three-quarters the per-guest room price of The St. Regis Washington, D.C. (which sold in July 2015 for $82 million ($110,004,160 in 2025 dollars)).

CTF Georgetown Hotel hired Rosewood Hotels & Resorts, a Hong Kong–based luxury hotel and resort company, to brand and manage the property. The Rosewood opened on April 21, 2016, making it the first Rosewood property in the Washington metropolitan area. Rosewood Hotels said it intended to make only cosmetic changes to the hotel.

== Bibliography ==
- Jefferis, Alan; Jefferis, Janice (2008). Residential Design, Drafting, and Detailing. Clifton Park, N.Y.: Thomson-Delmar Learning. ISBN 9781418012755.
- Rowan, Gerald; Sanford, Steve (2013). Compact Houses: 50 Creative Floor Plans for Efficient, Well-Designed Small Homes. North Adams, Mass.: Storey Publishing. ISBN 9781612121024.
- Washington, D.C. Economic Partnership (2011). D.C. Development Report: 2011/2012 Edition (PDF) (Report). Washington, D.C.: Washington, D.C. Economic Partnership.
