= Capella Hotels and Resorts =

Singaporean international luxury hotels chain

Capella Hotels & Resorts
- Industry: Hotels
- Founded: 31 October 2001; 24 years ago
- Headquarters: Singapore, Singapore
- Number of locations: 10 (2025)
- Area served: Worldwide
- Website: capellahotels.com

Capella Hotels & Resorts is a Singaporean hotel chain of luxury hotels and resorts based in Singapore, founded by Ritz-Carlton former head Horst Schulze in September 2001, with 9 properties worldwide. In 2017 Schulze sold Capella to the Kwee Family after Horst established Capella Ultra Luxury brand.

== Capella in media ==
Capella gained notability in 2018 when Capella Singapore became the venue for Donald Trump and Kim Jong Un.

In 2025 open-source intelligence efforts geo-located missing Slovak leader Robert Fico vacationing at Capella Hanoi.

== Notable properties ==
- Capella Bangkok
- Capella Singapore

== Former Properties ==
- Capella Washington D.C. Georgetown
