= El Conquistador Resort =

Resort in Fajardo, Puerto Rico

El Conquistador
- Interactive map of the El Conquistador area
- Former names: Las Vistas

General information
- Location: Fajardo, Puerto Rico, USA
- Coordinates: 18.3585045°N 65.6282546°W
- Opened: July 14, 1962
- Owner: Urbano Varro, LLC

Technical details
- Floor count: 5

Other information
- Number of rooms: 700

El Conquistador, known informally as El Con and formerly Las Vistas, is a vacation resort located on the outskirts of Fajardo, Puerto Rico. The resort was formerly part of the Waldorf Astoria Hotels & Resorts chain before being bought by Urbano Varro, LLC in 2019.

== History ==
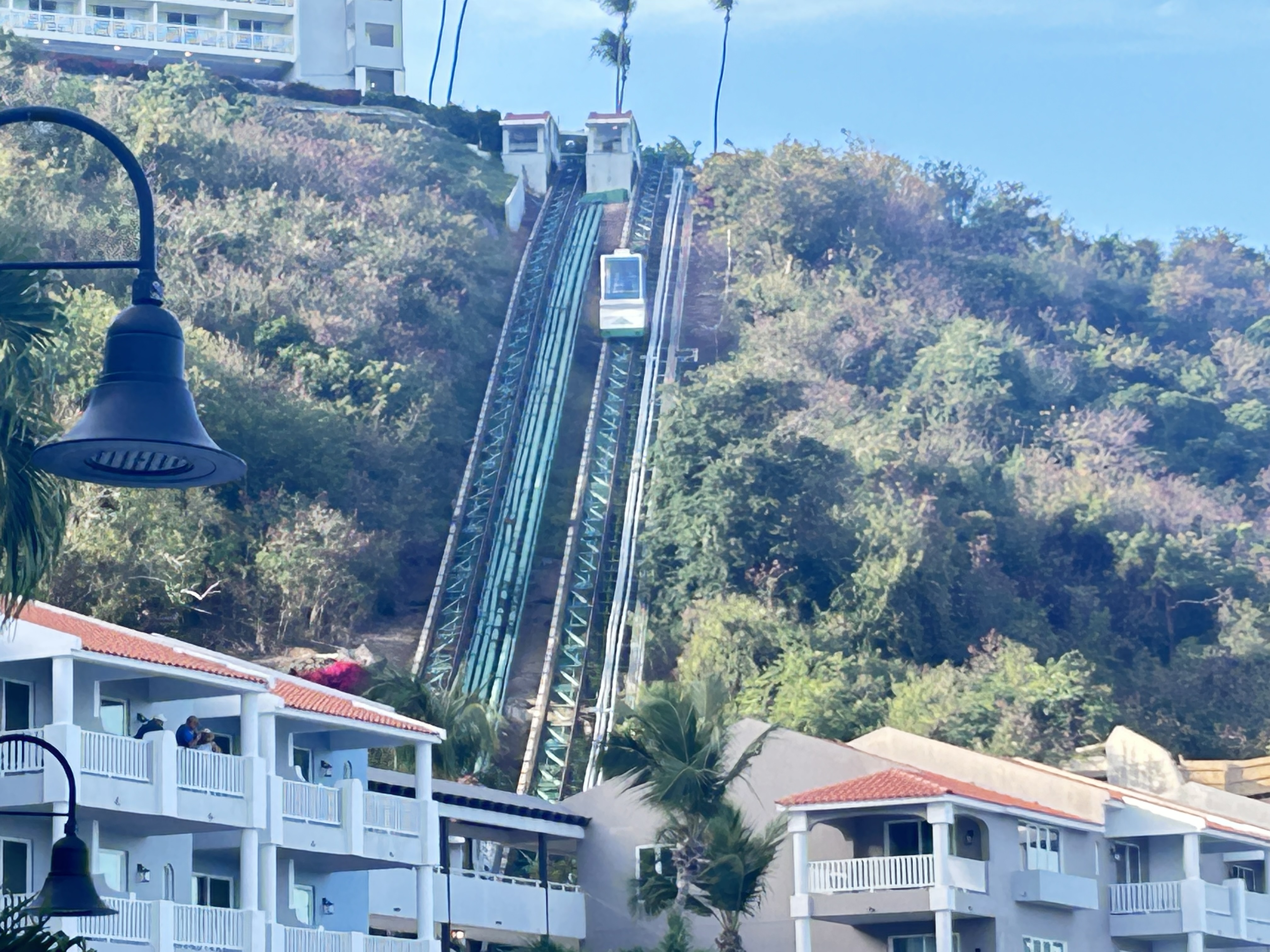
The funicular that connects two parts of the resort

Robert Aldersice oversaw the construction of the original hotel building, which had a total of 84 rooms covering four floors. Financial backers Richard Light and Ronald Evans also contributed to the resort's construction; architect Morris Lapidus designed the structures that would be located on the grounds of the resort. The resort opened its doors on July 14, 1962, being originally named "Las Vistas".

A large renovation took place on the site in 1968, which included the installation of a funicular that connected two separate parts of the resort. In 1993, a golf course designed by Arthur Hills was installed on resort grounds. In July 1996, the National Governors Association Conference was held at the resort.

=== Damage from Hurricane Maria ===
The resort was heavily damaged by Hurricane Maria in 2017, suspending travel reservations due to the damage. All staff on resort grounds at the time of Maria's landfall were safe. In November 2019, commercial real estate company Urbano Varro, LLC bought the property. The resort remained closed until March 2021 while significant repairs and renovations were made to the site. The resort remained partially reopened until 2022, when all 700 rooms were made available to the public. Renovations at the resort costed an estimated $220 million (2021 USD).

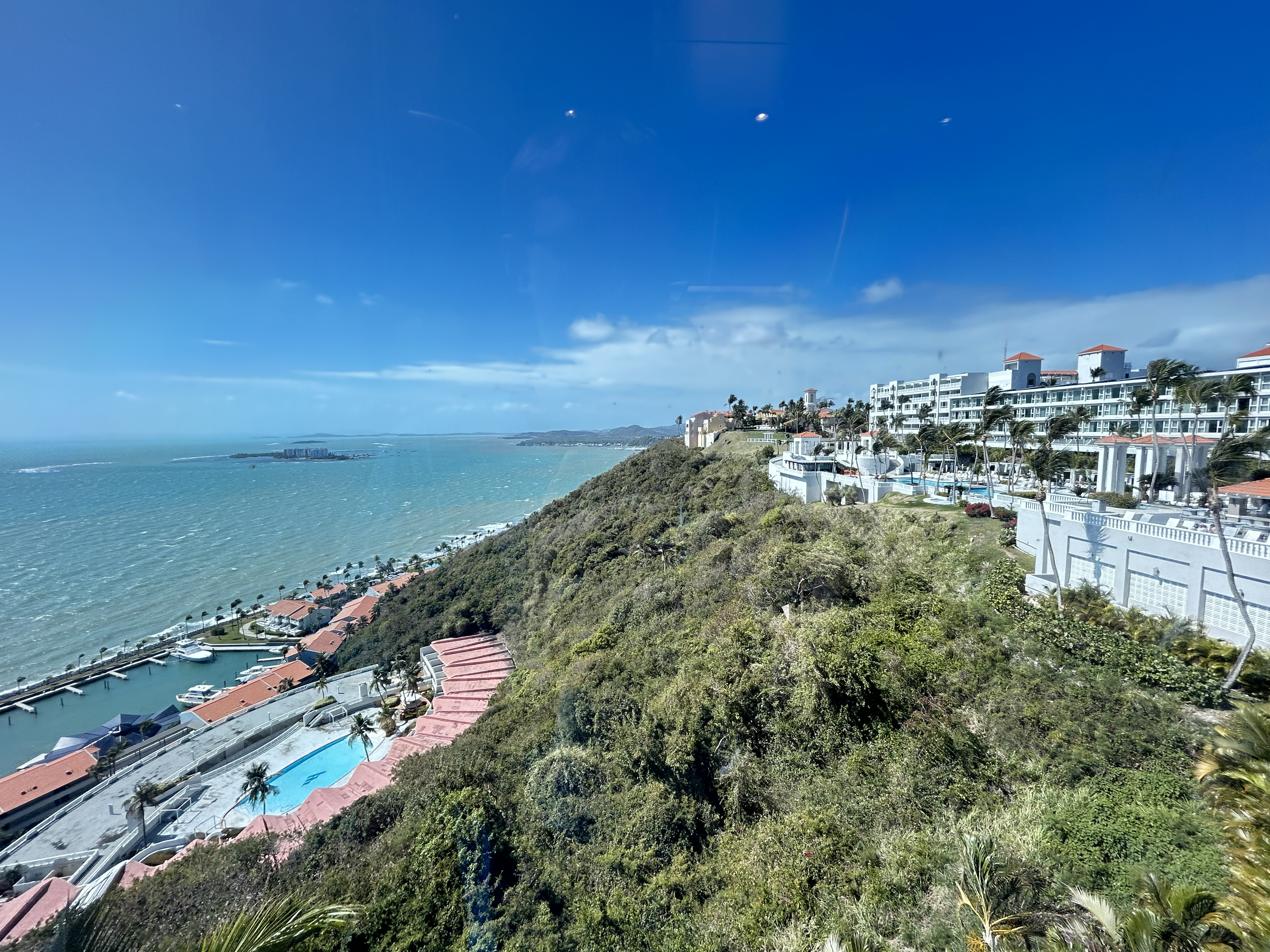
The main pool area and Ventanas restaurant (right)

== Facilities ==
Large portions of Palominos Island, located a short distance off-shore of the main resort grounds, have been rented out by the resort; guests take a 13-minute ferry to the island. Restaurants and cafes at the resort include El Cafecito, Café Bella Vista, Brisas Courtyard Café, Ballyhoo, Vinos & Tapas and Ventanas.

== Accolades ==
The resort won the World Travel Award's "Puerto Rico's Leading Resort" award in 2008, 2015, 2016, 2019, and 2024. In 2015, the Puerto Rico Hotel and Tourism Association named the resort the "Large Green Hotel of the Year".

== See also ==
- List of hotels in the United States
