= Embassy Suites by Hilton Washington DC Georgetown =

- Interactive map of the Embassy Suites by Hilton Washington DC Georgetown area

General information
- Location: United States, Washington, D.C.
- Coordinates: 38.906931°N 77.049438°W
- Opening: October 1987
- Cost: $43 million
- Owner: Hilton Hotels Corporation and Shuwa Investments Corp.
- Management: Embassy Suites Hotels

Height
- Height: 107 feet (33 m)

Technical details
- Floor count: 9

Design and construction
- Developer: Charles H. Shaw Co. and Holiday Corp.

Other information
- Number of suites: 318 (including executive suites)
- Number of restaurants: 1

Website
- embassysuites3.hilton.com

The Embassy Suites by Hilton Washington DC Georgetown is a Modernist hotel located at 1250 22nd Street NW in the West End neighborhood of Washington, D.C., in the United States. Part of the Embassy Suites Hotels chain of upscale hotels, the hotel is noted for its eight-story atrium, which contains tropical plants, a waterfall, and a lagoon.

== Description ==
By the 1960s, Washington, D.C.'s West End neighborhood was a decaying area of Victorian townhouses and abandoned light industrial sites. In 1974, the city significantly revised its zoning regulations. Among the changes, the city treated hotels the same as residential housing, which spurred a hotel construction boom.

In June 1986, the Oliver Carr Company sold a tract of land at 2200 N Street NW to the Chicago development firm of Charles H. Shaw Co. and Holiday Corp. (owner of the Holiday Inn chain) for $11.4 million. The 318-room, all-suite hotel opened in October 1987.

The centerpiece of the hotel was its skylit, eight-story atrium. The atrium was intended to mimic a tropical rain forest, and contained palm trees; a two-story, terraced waterfall; and a lagoon in which both ducks and red koi fish swam. At night, the atrium was lit by soft glowing paper lanterns in an Asian motif. All rooms in the hotel were suites, and all rooms overlooked either the hotel's atrium or city streets. The corner suites were much larger, and called "executive suites" by the hotel. Rooms on the eighth and ninth floors of the nine-story hotel had views of the nearby Georgetown neighborhood, and the hotel's amenities included a restaurant, bar, swimming pool with attached whirlpool, and sauna.

The Embassy Suites Washington, D.C. was unionized shortly after it opened. Although numerous hotels were built in Washington, D.C., over the next 20 years, the Embassy Suites was one of only two hotels to be unionized in the city. (The other was the Mandarin Oriental, Washington, D.C.)

In April 1988, a Japanese real estate investment company, Shuwa Investments Corp., bought 50 percent interest in the Embassy Suites for $21.5 million.

The Embassy Suites Washington, D.C. underwent a renovation to its guest rooms and public spaces beginning in November 2012. Among the amenities added were free Internet kiosks in the lobby.

== Ownership changes ==
In December 1989, Holiday Corp. spun off Embassy Suites and its other hotels as stand-alone Promus Companies. Promus Companies decided to split the gambling interests it owned from its tourist and business travel hotel chains, and in 1995 spun off Embassy Suites and its other hotel chains as the stand-alone Promus Hotel Corporation..

Promus Hotel Corporation was purchased by Hilton Hotels Corporation for $3.1 billion in September 1999.
