= Courtyard by Marriott Washington, DC Dupont Circle Hotel =

Hotel in Washington, D.C.

Coordinates: 38.9072°N 77.0396°W

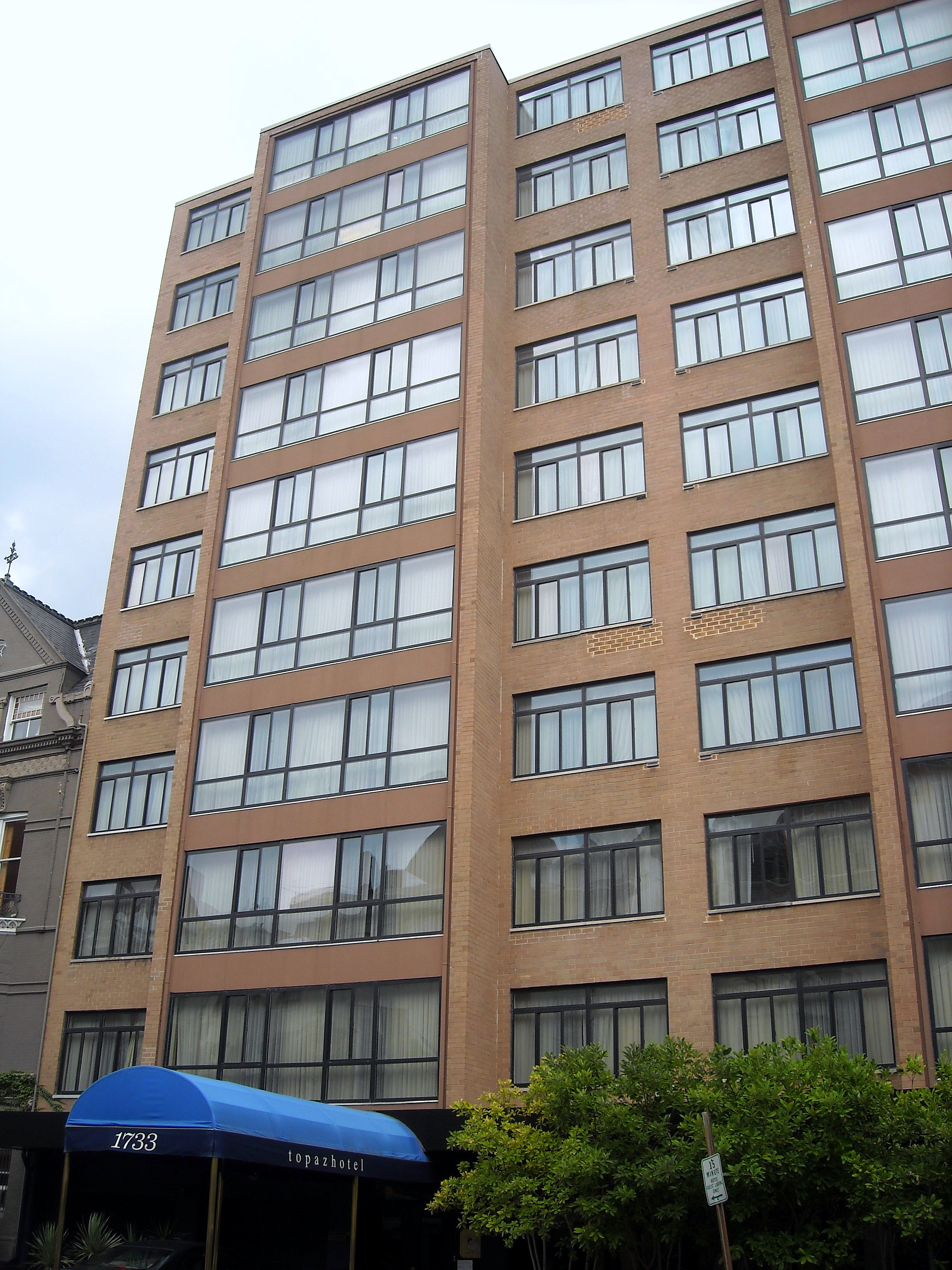
Courtyard by Marriott Washington, DC Dupont Circle

The Courtyard by Marriott Washington, DC Dupont Circle is a 143-room hotel, located at 1733 N Street Northwest, between Dupont Circle and Scott Circle in Washington, D.C.

== History ==
Constructed as an apartment building in 1964, the structure was converted to a hotel in 1979, opening as the Canterbury Hotel. It was purchased in March 2001 for $10.5 million by LaSalle Hotel Properties of Bethesda, Maryland. It reopened in October 2001 as the 99-room Kimpton Topaz Hotel, the first Kimpton-managed boutique hotel on the East Coast. The Kimpton Topaz Hotel closed on November 25, 2019, after being acquired by Douglas Development for $33.1 million. It reopened in November 2021 as the 143-room Courtyard Washington, DC Dupont Circle .
