= Capitol Skyline Hotel =

Former hotel in Washington, D.C., U.S.

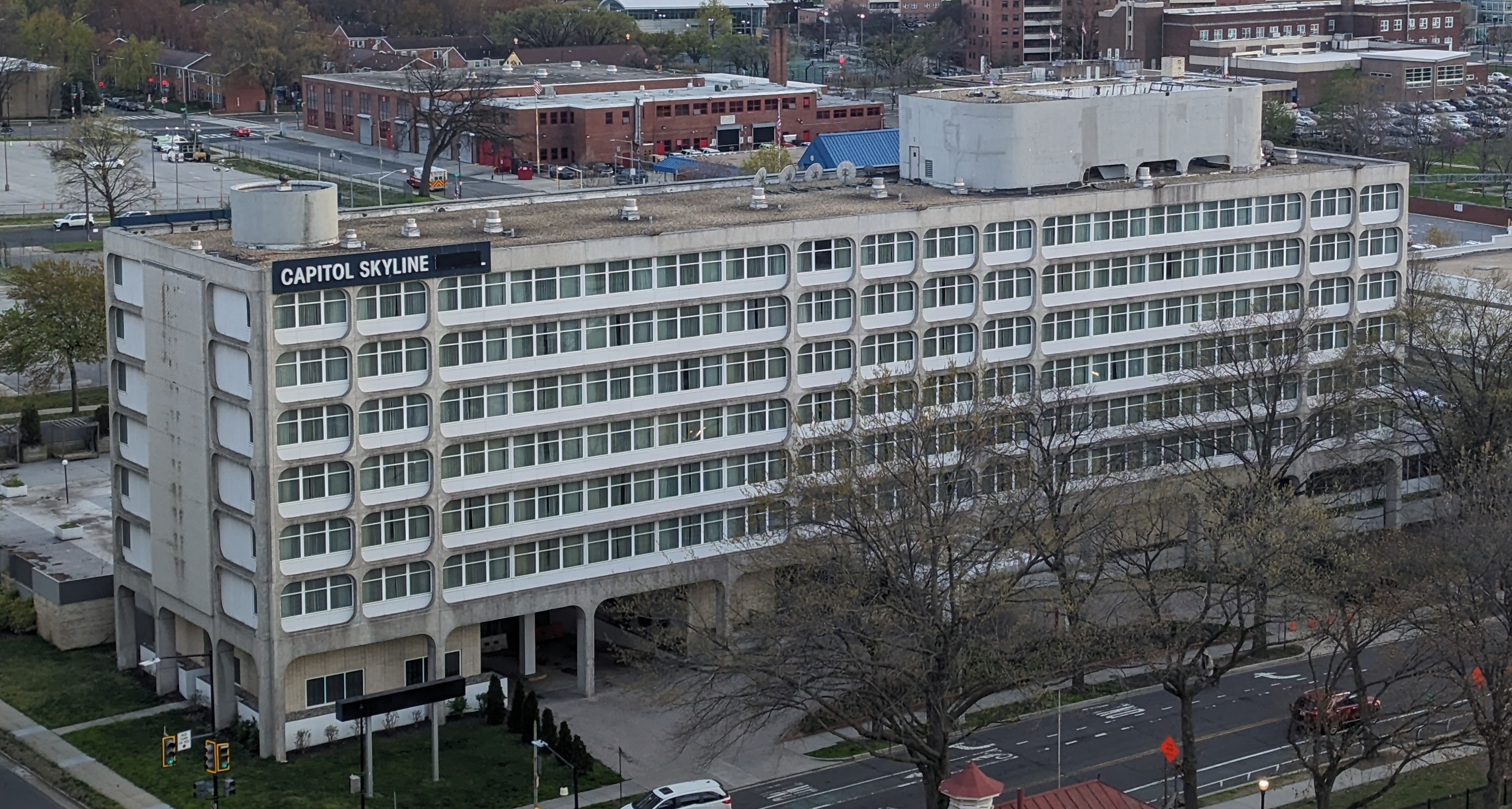
- Capitol Skyline Hotel in 2024
- Interactive map of the Capitol Skyline Hotel area

General information
- Location: Washington, D.C., United States, 10 I St SW
- Coordinates: 38°52′44″N 77°0′35″W
- Opening: November 1962; 63 years ago
- Closed: 2020
- Demolished: 2026

Technical details
- Floor count: 7

Design and construction
- Architect: Morris Lapidus

Other information
- Number of rooms: 203

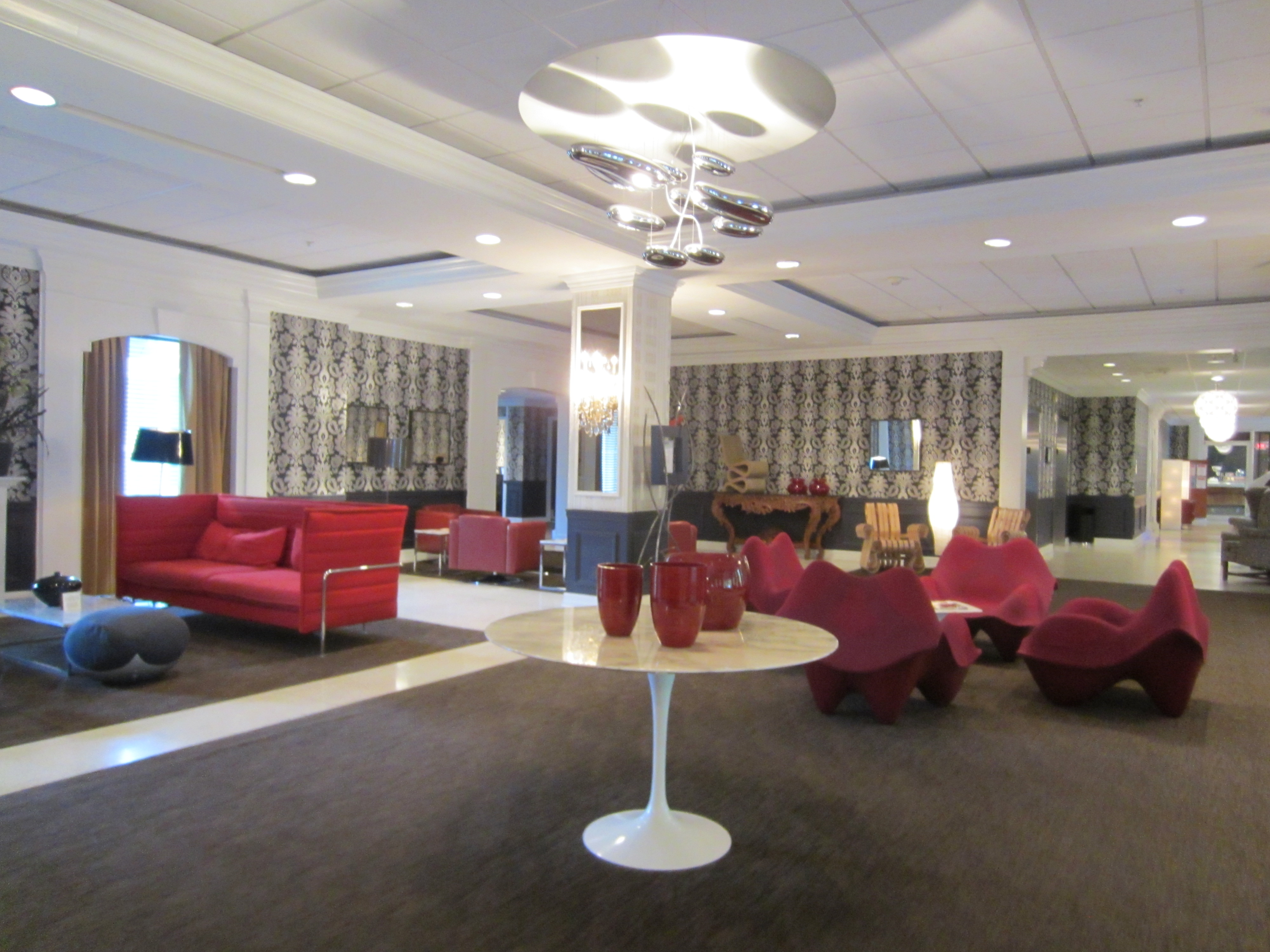
The hotel's lobby in 2013

The Capitol Skyline Hotel was a hotel located near the United States Capitol in Capitol Hill, Washington, D.C. Designed by Morris Lapidus, the hotel opened in November 1962 as the Skyline Inn, and was once part of the Best Western chain. The hotel closed during the COVID-19 pandemic and was used to shelter medically vulnerable residents.
