= Brickskeller =

Tavern located in Washington, D. C

Coordinates: 38.9103°N 77.0486°W

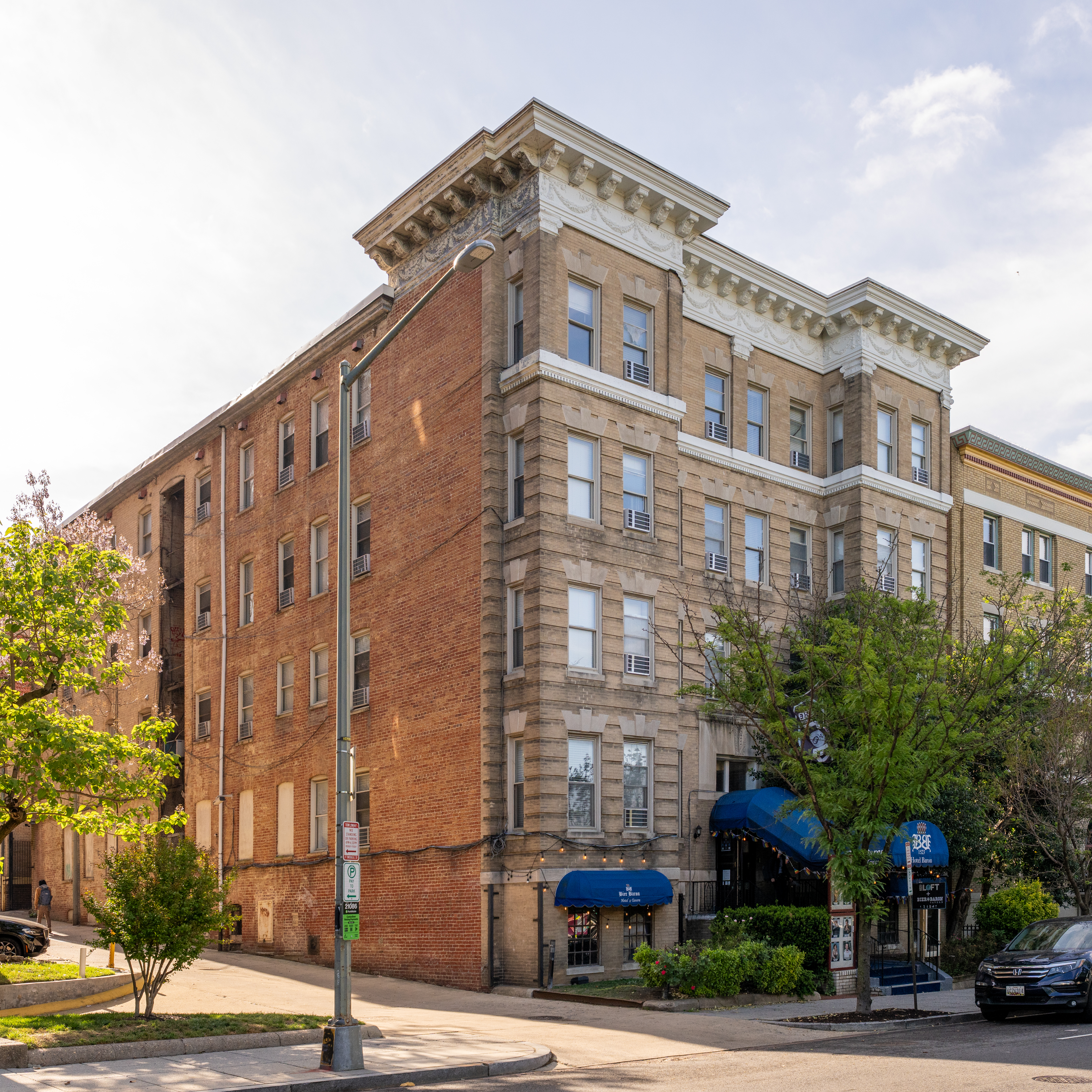
The Brickskeller, a tavern and hotel located in the Dupont Circle neighborhood of Washington, D.C.

The DC Comedy Loft and Bier Baron Tavern (formally The Brickskeller Dining House and Down Home Saloon) is a tavern in Washington, D.C., located near Dupont Circle across from Rock Creek Park and on the edge of Georgetown, in the Baron Hotel building. It was founded by Felix Coja and his wife, Marie.

Felix and Marie were originally from the French Mediterranean island of Corsica and immigrated to the United States after World War I. Coja, a Cordon Bleu-trained Master French chef, found work in Washington, D.C., at the Blackstone Hotel on 17th Street NW.

Following his time at the Blackstone, Felix and Marie acquired The Robert Peter Inn several blocks away near 22nd and P Street NW. They changed the name to The Marifex Hotel and established the Brickskeller restaurant in 1957, as a rathskeller-type eatery.

In the 1960s, their son Maurice and his wife June further developed the property. In 1982, their daughter Diane and her husband, former bartender Dave Alexander, took over the daily operations. On December 18, 2010, the Alexanders sold the building and business, which was renamed The Bier Baron Tavern.

The Brickskeller had over 1,200 choices of bottled and canned beer in the coolers, over a dozen keg beers, and real ale in casks. It was the first restaurant of its kind to offer customers a beer list with thousands of beers from around the world.

== The Brickskeller ==
=== Menu ===
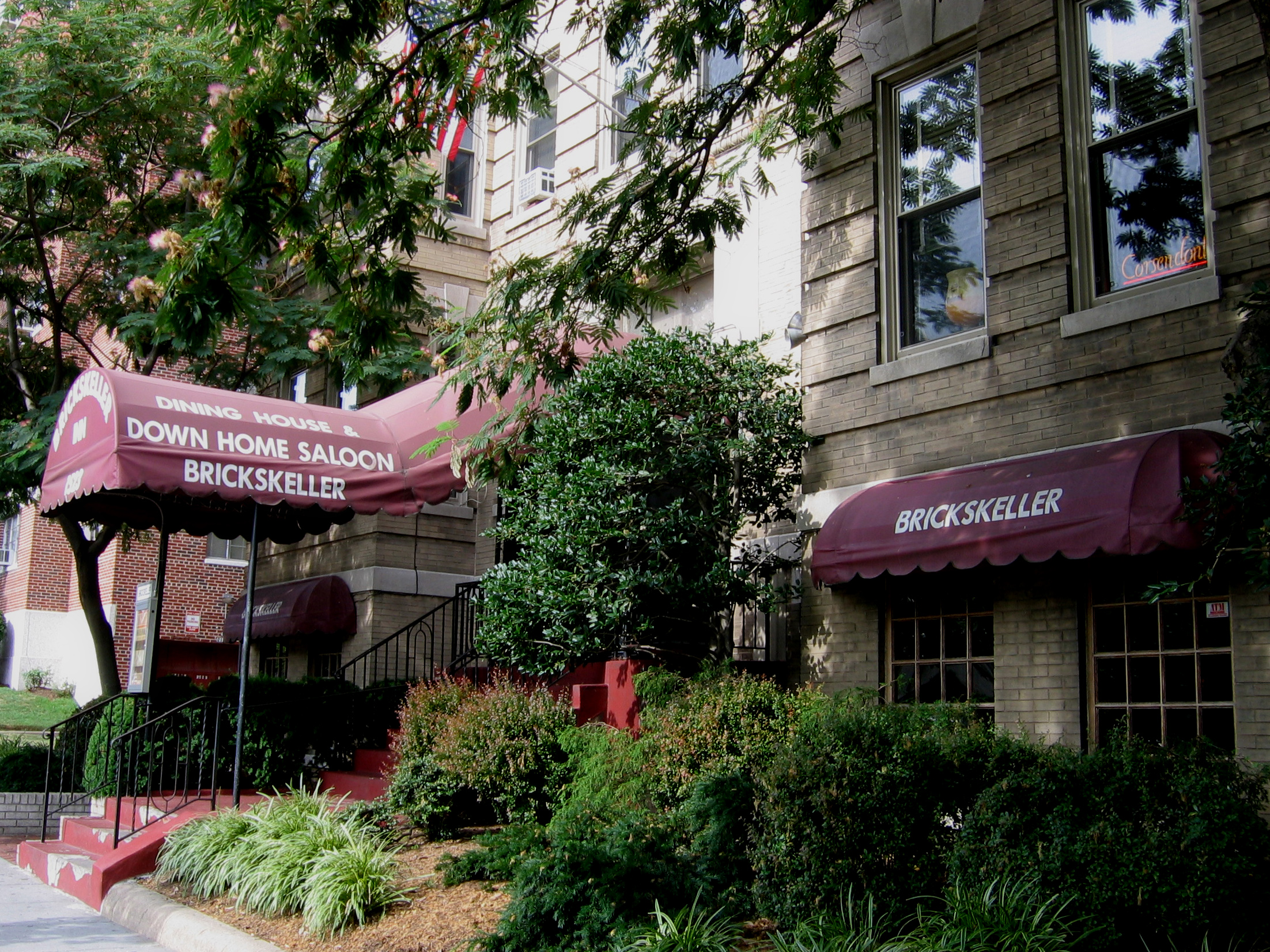
Entrance to The Brickskeller Dining House and Down Home Saloon

The Brickskeller featured beer from around the world and a large selection of domestic brews. The menu included several hundreds of Belgian beers, dozens of varieties of wheat beers like Paulaner, and witbiers such as Hoegaarden.

It also offered other European brews including Baltic porter Baltica 6 and the Herold microbrew from the Czech Republic. The beer list also included Bud Light, Miller, Old Style, Point, Rainier, Henry Weinhardt, Leinenkugel, Yeungling, Rolling Rock, Knickerbocker, Rhinelander, and Stony.

In 1957, the Brickskeller opened with over 50 beers, offering a beer list, beer tastings, and real ale in casks.

The Brickskeller also had more than 50 aged beers and four varieties of mead ("honey wine"). Its beer cocktail menu featured numerous beer cocktails, including "Maui Mouthwash", which contained Malibu Caribbean White Rum with Coconut, fruit juice, blue curacao, vodka and golden lager, and Smack & Tan.

In the 1970s, it became a gathering spot for beer can collectors. A customer could ask that the can be opened from the bottom, enhancing its value as a collector's item.

The Brickskeller served standard American pub food, including spicy chicken wings, mozzarella sticks, potato skins, chicken tenders, and burgers. In the 1980s, the Brickskeller introduced buffalo meat burgers and buffalo pizza.

Other menu items included spinach and artichoke dip, pierogies, spiced shrimp, salad, and sandwiches. The staff called the kitchen a "submarine kitchen", putting out an average of over 650 dinners a night. The Brickskeller was open for lunch on weekdays and opened at 6 p.m. on Saturdays and Sundays.

=== Atmosphere ===
The Brickskeller had a rustic saloon motif. On the lower level, old barrels were made into bar stools. Upstairs held beer tastings and could be reserved for special events. The Brickskeller added televisions upstairs in 2003 to show March Madness and other sports events. The Brickskeller could seat 450 guests on both floors.

The Brickskeller was close to Georgetown, George Washington University, and American University. Politicians, Capitol Hill aides, diplomats, local university students, DC residents, and tourists were regular customers. Over the years, celebrities like Quentin Tarantino, Jerry Seinfeld, members of Pink Floyd, Neil Young, Brooke Shields, and Jim Morrison visited.

It became known as a destination for beer aficionados from around the world. The spy Aldrich Ames met with his Soviet counterparts in a dark corner of the dining room.

=== Events ===
The Brickskeller frequently hosted beer tastings and sponsored other events, including many educational seminars at the National Geographic Society as well as Smithsonian seminars. These seminars drew top experts and speakers, including Bert Grant, Russ Scherer, Fritz Maytag, Ken Grossman, Tomme Arthur, Vinnie CilurO, Aram Avery, Larry Bell, Kim Jordan, Garrett Oliver from Brooklyn Brewery, and Dick Yuengling of D.G. Yuengling & Son.

The Bier Baron Tavern currently hosts stand-up comedy acts, educational lectures, and podcasts after adding the DC Comedy Loft showroom in 2018.

== R.F.D. Washington ==
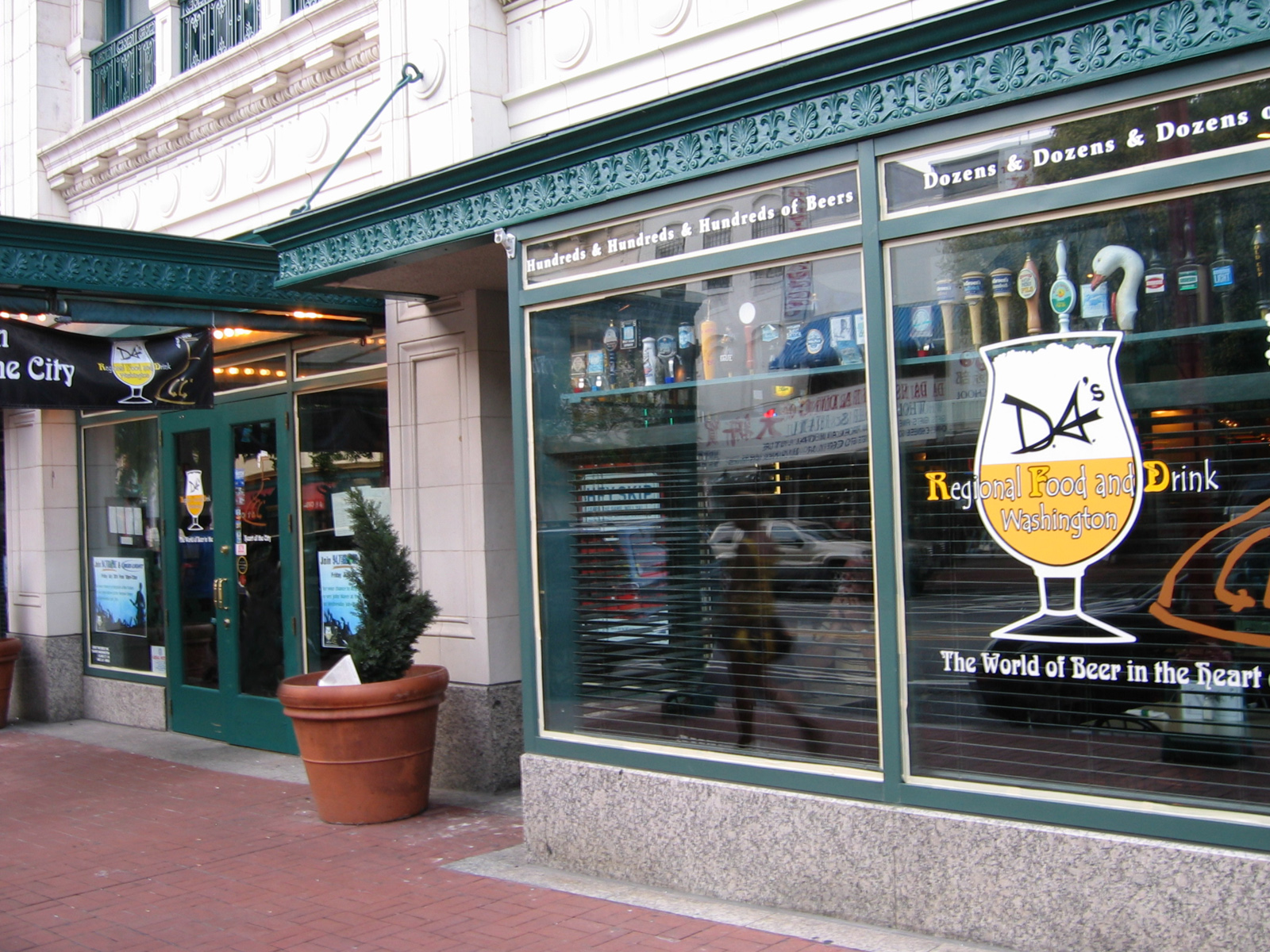
R.F.D. Washington in Chinatown

Dave and Diane Alexander opened a sister location called R.F.D. (Regional Food & Drink) in 2003 in Chinatown, near the Gallery Place Metro station, at the former Coco Loco site.

R.F.D. occupied a larger space than the Brickskeller did, allowing the owners to provide an even larger selection of draft beer. The front and back rooms had about 40 taps, which used a 75/25 gas blend. It was the city’s largest selection the Birch & Barley and ChurchKey opened in October 2009.

RFD closed in 2017.

== Brickskeller Inn ==
The building used for the Brickskeller was first occupied in 1912. Felix opened The Brickskeller Inn in 1957, replacing the former occupant, the Robert Peter Inn. As of 2002, the hotel remained open as a small European-style inn that offers single and double rooms.
