= The Ritz-Carlton, Washington, D.C. =

Hotel

The Ritz-Carlton Washington, D.C.
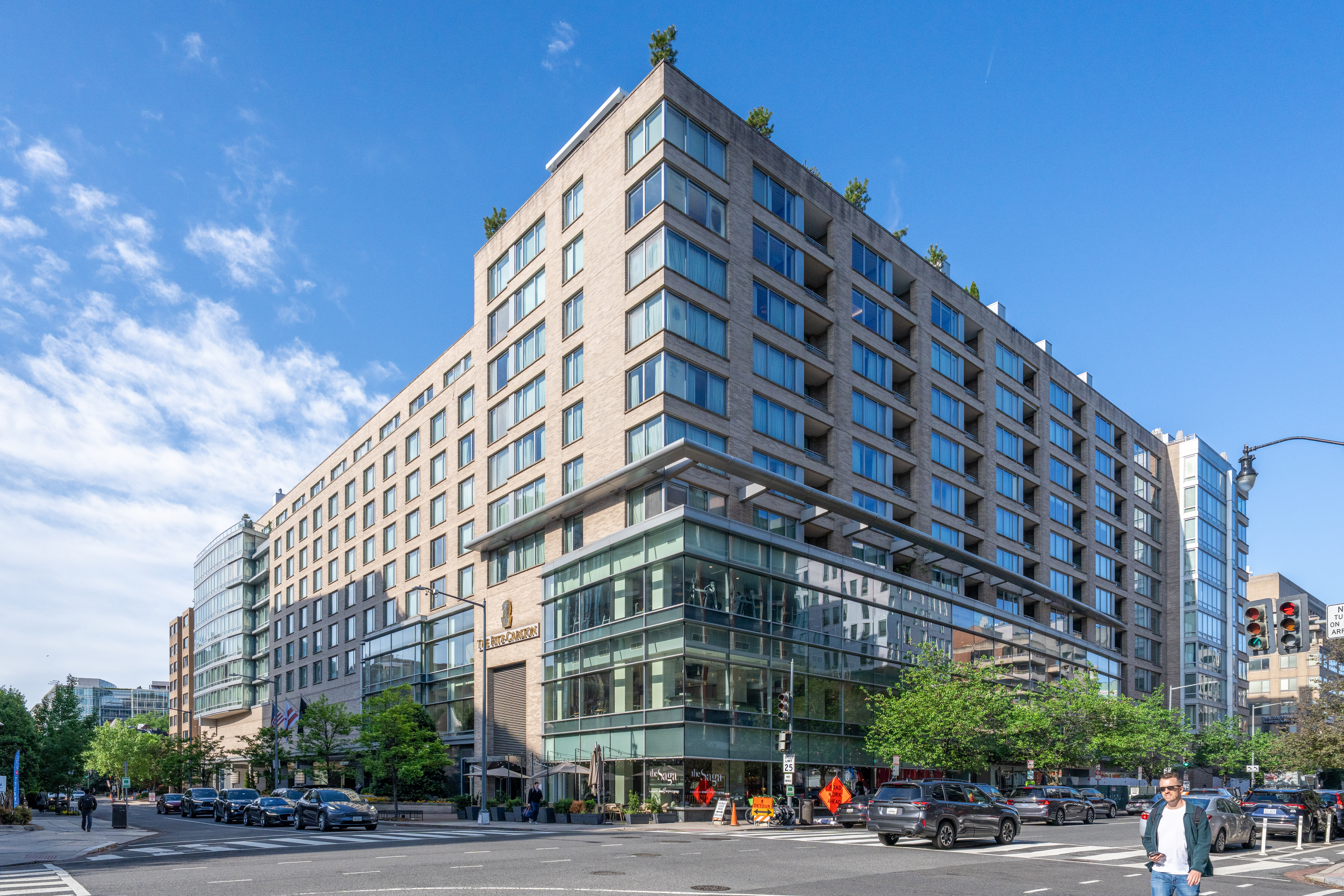

- Location within the District of Columbia

General information
- Location: 1150 22nd Street, Northwest Washington, D.C. 20037, United States
- Coordinates: 38°54′16″N 77°2′57″W
- Operator: Ritz-Carlton

Technical details
- Floor count: 11

Other information
- Number of rooms: 300
- Number of suites: 32
- Number of restaurants: 2

Website
- www.ritzcarlton.com

The Ritz-Carlton Washington, D.C. is a luxury hotel located at 1150 22nd Street NW in the West End neighborhood of Washington, D.C., in the United States. Managed by the Ritz-Carlton Hotel Company, the hotel has 300 guest rooms, including 267 deluxe rooms and 32 suites.

== About the hotel ==
The hotel underwent a $12 million renovation which was completed in 2008. The hotel has two restaurants, one of which (Westend Bistro) is led by executive chef Eric Ripert. The hotel also has an extensive 100,000-square-foot (9,300 m^{2}) sports facility called Equinox Sports Club, (formerly The Sports Club/LA), and first-floor retail space housing a CVS/pharmacy and a bank.

== Rating ==
In February 2016, the hotel had a four-star rating from Forbes Travel Guide, but a five-diamond rating from AAA.
