= St. Gregory Hotel =

Hotel in Washington, D.C., United States

The St. Gregory Hotel

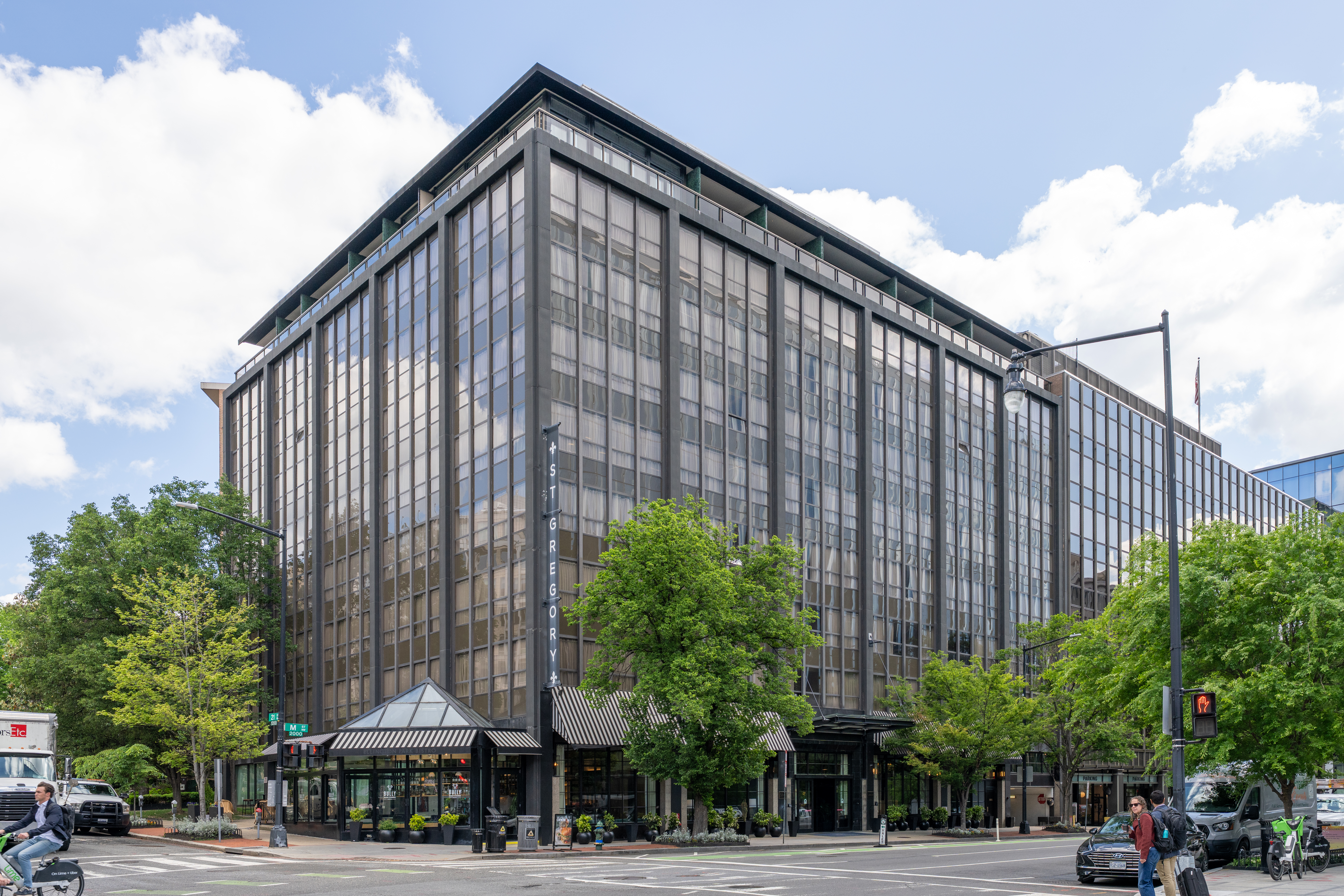
- St. Gregory Hotel in 2026
- Interactive map of the The St. Gregory Hotel area

General information
- Location: United States, 2033 M Street NW, Washington, D.C.
- Coordinates: 38.905896°N 77.046220°W
- Opened: June 2000
- Owner: Hersha Hotels and Resorts

Technical details
- Floor count: 9

Design and construction
- Developer: St. James Associates, a subsidiary of Capitol Hotels LLC

Other information
- Number of rooms: 155 rooms
- Number of suites: 116 suites
- Number of restaurants: 1

Website
- The St. Gregory Hotel

The St. Gregory Hotel is a boutique hotel located in downtown Washington, D.C., in the United States. Established in 2000, the nine-floor hotel has 155 rooms, which includes 54 deluxe rooms, 85 suites with kitchens, and 16 top-floor suites with balconies. The hotel, which changed hands in June 2015, has a life-size statue of Marilyn Monroe in the lobby.

== About the hotel ==
=== History ===
2033 M Street NW was originally an office building, constructed in 1965. Elements of the Federal Communications Commission (FCC) occupied the building from 1969 to 1999. The FCC vacated the building for a new headquarters in 1998. Local construction company executive Larry Lipnick formed Capital Hotels LLC, which purchased the building in May 1999 for $8.9 million. The structure was renovated into a hotel, which opened for business in June 2000. A life-size statue of Marilyn Monroe, depicting her in the famous "subway grate breeze" scene from the film The Seven Year Itch, decorated the lobby at the entrance to the lounge.

The hotel was given a $3 million renovation from 2006 to 2007, during which the Monroe statue was removed for three months. The hotel underwent renovations again in 2009, and in the fall of 2014.

In June 2015, Hersha Hotels and Resorts purchased the hotel for $57 million. Hersha partnered with the Zavino Hospitality Group of Philadelphia on renovating the hotel's bar, food service, patio, and restaurant. The renovation, which began in July 2016, included the creation of a new restaurant, the 30-seat Tredici—a restaurant concept developed by Zavino which features shared Mediterranean-style dishes, a charcuterie, and a raw bar. The restaurant was overseen by Executive Chef Carlos Aparicio. The lobby renovation (inspired by the Nomad Hotel in New York City, the Edition hotel in London, and the Hotel Bel-Air in Los Angeles) features new wood paneling, a natural gas-fired fire pit, and seating for 40 people. Each room now has a 49-inch (120 cm) flat screen television and luxury bath products. The price of the renovation was not disclosed, but Hersha raised at least $200,000 toward the cost.

=== Description of the hotel ===
The St. Gregory Hotel is located at 2033 M Street NW in downtown Washington, D.C., and has 155 total guest rooms. Of these, 15 are one-bedroom suites and another 85 are one-bedroom suites with kitchens. Another 16 one-bedroom "sky suites" occupy the hotel's top floor. These have balconies, and provide good views of downtown and nearby monuments. The remaining 39 rooms are "deluxe" hotel rooms.

The 30-seat hotel restaurant, named Tredici, opened in October 2016.
