= The Ritz-Carlton, Georgetown =

Hotel in Washington, D.C., United States

The Ritz-Carlton Georgetown, Washington, D.C.

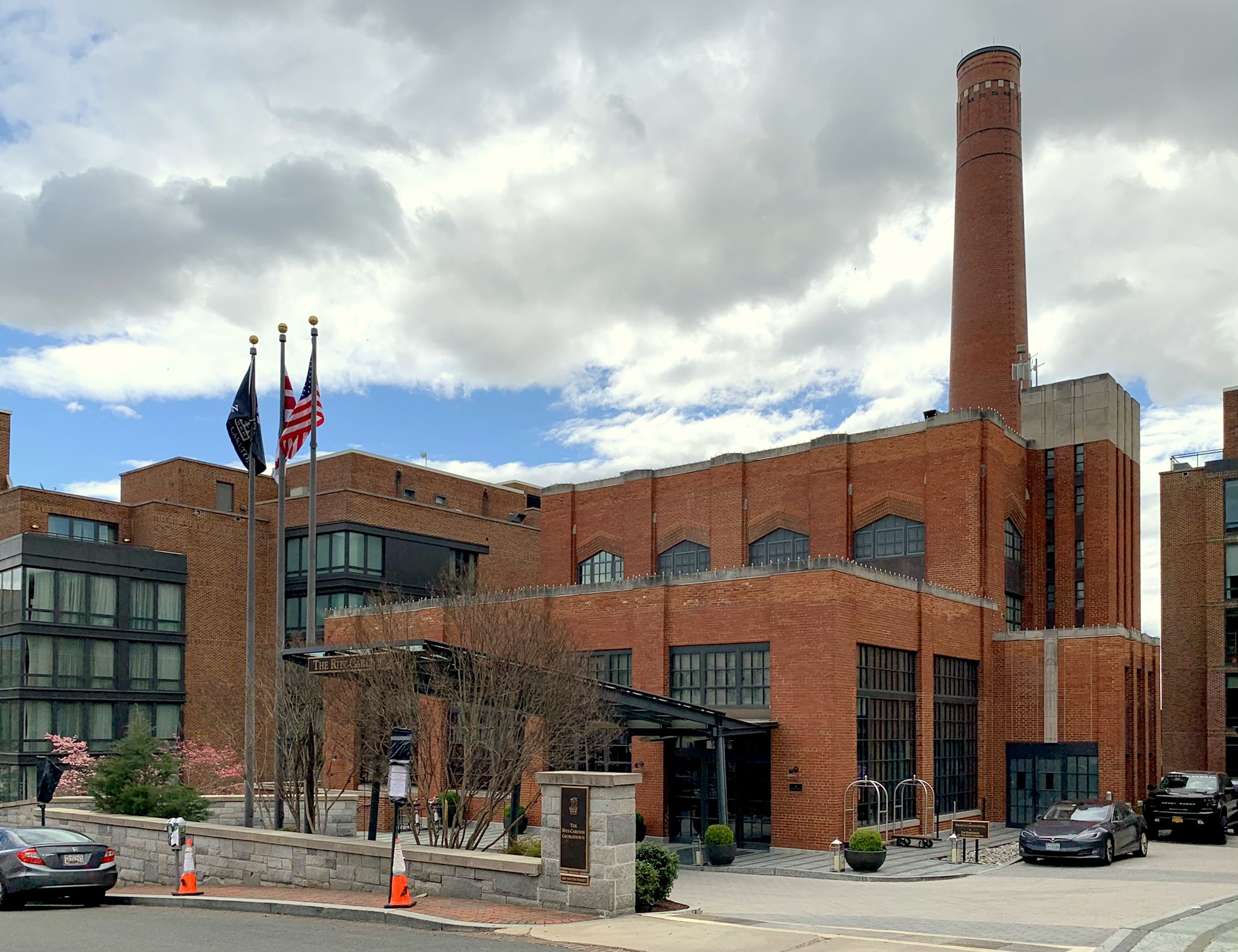
- Interactive map of the The Ritz-Carlton Georgetown, Washington, D.C. area

General information
- Location: Washington, D.C., U.S.
- Coordinates: 38.903099°N 77.061743°W
- Opening: April 2003
- Owner: Marriott International (The Ritz-Carlton Hotel Company)
- Operator: Hersha Hotels and Resorts

Design and construction
- Architect: Handel Architects

Other information
- Number of rooms: 86 rooms (exclusive of suites)
- Number of suites: 27 suites, 5 luxury suites
- Number of restaurants: 1

Website
- ritzcarlton.com

The Ritz-Carlton Georgetown, Washington, D.C., is a luxury hotel located in the Georgetown neighborhood of Washington, D.C. It is near The Kennedy Center and the Georgetown waterfront. It is an AAA 5-star luxury hotel, and has 86 rooms, 27 premier suites, and five luxury suites. All rooms and suites have a view of the Potomac River and historic Georgetown. It contains a 140 feet (43 m) smokestack which is a private eight-seat dining room. It is a small hotel and is known to be good for privacy. The hotel contains a restaurant, bar, and a fitness center with a newly refreshed spa after a $1.5 million renovation in 2016. The rooms are on average 450 square feet (42 m^{2}) in size and is located in a historic industrial building.

== About ==
The Ritz-Carlton Georgetown opened in 2003. The hotel was built as part of a $175 million complex financed by developer Millennium Partners that included the 86-room hotel, a 29-unit condominium, a 14-screen movie theater, and a 600-space parking garage. The building, a former incinerator, was renovated to appear as three distinct buildings from the outside. The hotel occupied the eastern and western "buildings", while the condominiums and the hotel's lobby, bar, and lounge occupied the central section. Millennium Partners began selling the condominiums at $2 million for 3,300 square feet (310 m^{2}) and $9 million for 6,500 square feet (600 m^{2}), and used the proceeds to cover debt service on the hotel.

Each wing of the hotel was designed to be physically isolated from the rest of the building, giving an entourage access to as many as 40 rooms at one time. The hotel's 34 suites, which initially rented for $5,000 a night, all had windows with bulletproof glass, to entice diplomatic guests. The Ritz-Carlton, Georgetown's main floor contained a 70-seat restaurant and bar with hardwood flooring, Oriental rugs, and glass tables with black-enamelled steel borders. The hotel's meeting space was located on the below-ground floor. Although limited in size (it would seat just 15 people), the room featured a customized, segmented glass table which could be configured for fifteen people or just two. A fitness center and spa were also built on the premises.

The hotel was initially owned by Millennium Partners and managed by Ritz-Carlton hotels, a chain of luxury hotels. It is located near John F. Kennedy Center for the Performing Arts and the Georgetown waterfront. It is an AAA 5-star luxury hotel, one of the four in Washington, D.C. The hotel as of 2017 includes 86 rooms, 27 premier suites, and 5 luxury suites. All rooms and suites have a view of the Potomac River and historic Georgetown. It contains a 140 feet (43 m) smokestack which is a private dining room.

It is located in the centre of Georgetown and is an "exclusively small" hotel in Georgetown. It is known to offer a high standard of privacy to all guests. The hotel contains a restaurant called "Degrees Bistro", bar, and a fitness center with a boutique spa. The restaurant serves contemporary American cuisine. The rooms are on average 450 square feet (42 m^{2}) and feature wood furniture. The hotel is a former historic industrial building; original brick and steel beams showcase in the lobby and restaurant. The hotel offers music, movie, and yoga events.

Hersha Hotels and Resorts purchased The Ritz-Carlton, Georgetown in December 2015 for $50 million.

== Rating ==
In February 2016, the hotel had a four-star rating from Forbes Travel Guide, but a five-diamond rating from AAA.
