= Bucksbaum =

Bucksbaum is a German surname meaning box tree. Notable people with the surname include:

- John Bucksbaum (born c. 1957), American businessman
- Martin Bucksbaum (c. 1920–1995), American businessman
- Matthew Bucksbaum (1926–2013), American businessman
- Melva Bucksbaum (1933–2015), American art collector, curator and patron of the arts
- Philip H. Bucksbaum (born 1953), American physicist

== See also ==
- Buxbaum
- Buchsbaum
