= Ann B. Friedman =

Philanthropist and museum founder

- Born: Ann L. Bucksbaum; April 13, 1954 (age 72); Marshalltown, Iowa, U.S.
- Education: Stanford University; London School of Economics; American University
- Known for: Founder, Planet Word
- Spouse: Thomas Friedman (m. 1978)
- Children: 2
- Relatives: Matthew Bucksbaum (father)

Ann B. Friedman (born 1954) is a former teacher and founder of Planet Word, a museum devoted to language arts that opened in Washington, D.C. in October 2020.

== Early life ==
Ann Louise Bucksbaum was born in Marshalltown, Iowa on April 13, 1954. Her parents were real estate developer Matthew Bucksbaum and Carolyn "Kay" Swartz. Matthew Bucksbaum co-founded the shopping mall giant General Growth Properties. The couple had two children, Ann and John Bucksbaum.

She graduated from Theodore Roosevelt High School in Des Moines in 1973. She graduated in 1975 from Stanford University with majors in economics and history. While there, she was inducted into Phi Beta Kappa. Friedman earned a master's degree in International Relations from the London School of Economics and Political Science in 1976. Friedman later earned a master's in teaching from American University in 1998.

== Career ==
Early in her career, Friedman worked for investment bankers in Chicago, New York, London and Beirut.

In 1988, Friedman, who with her family, moved to the Washington D. C. area, started teaching privately in “a course she devised on world cultures and geography.” According to one source, Friedman tutored illiterate adults in reading as well as English as a second language. Later she taught first and second graders. Friedman formerly taught reading at Bethesda, Maryland's Burning Tree Elementary School.

=== Planet Word ===
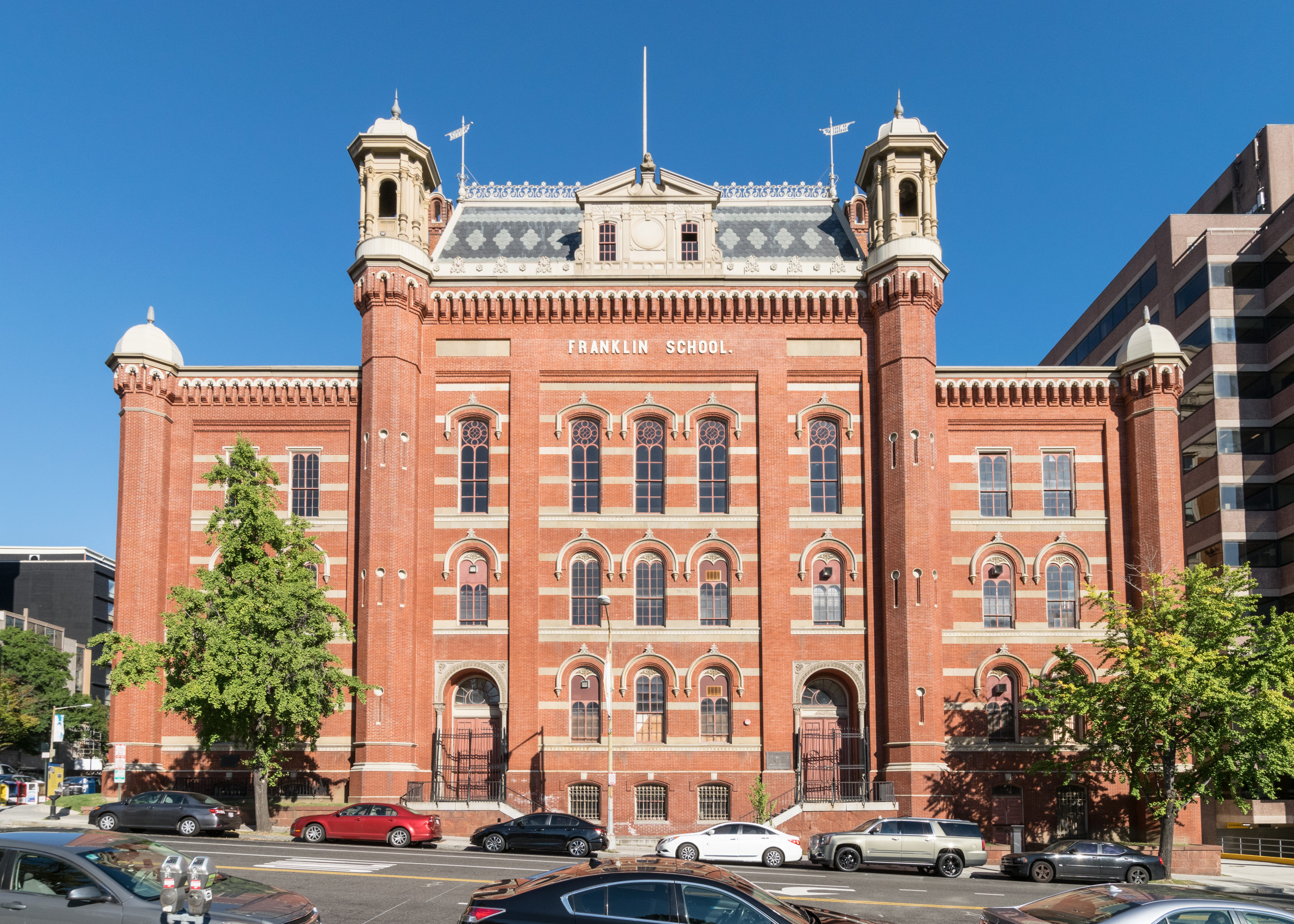
Franklin School, Washington, D.C

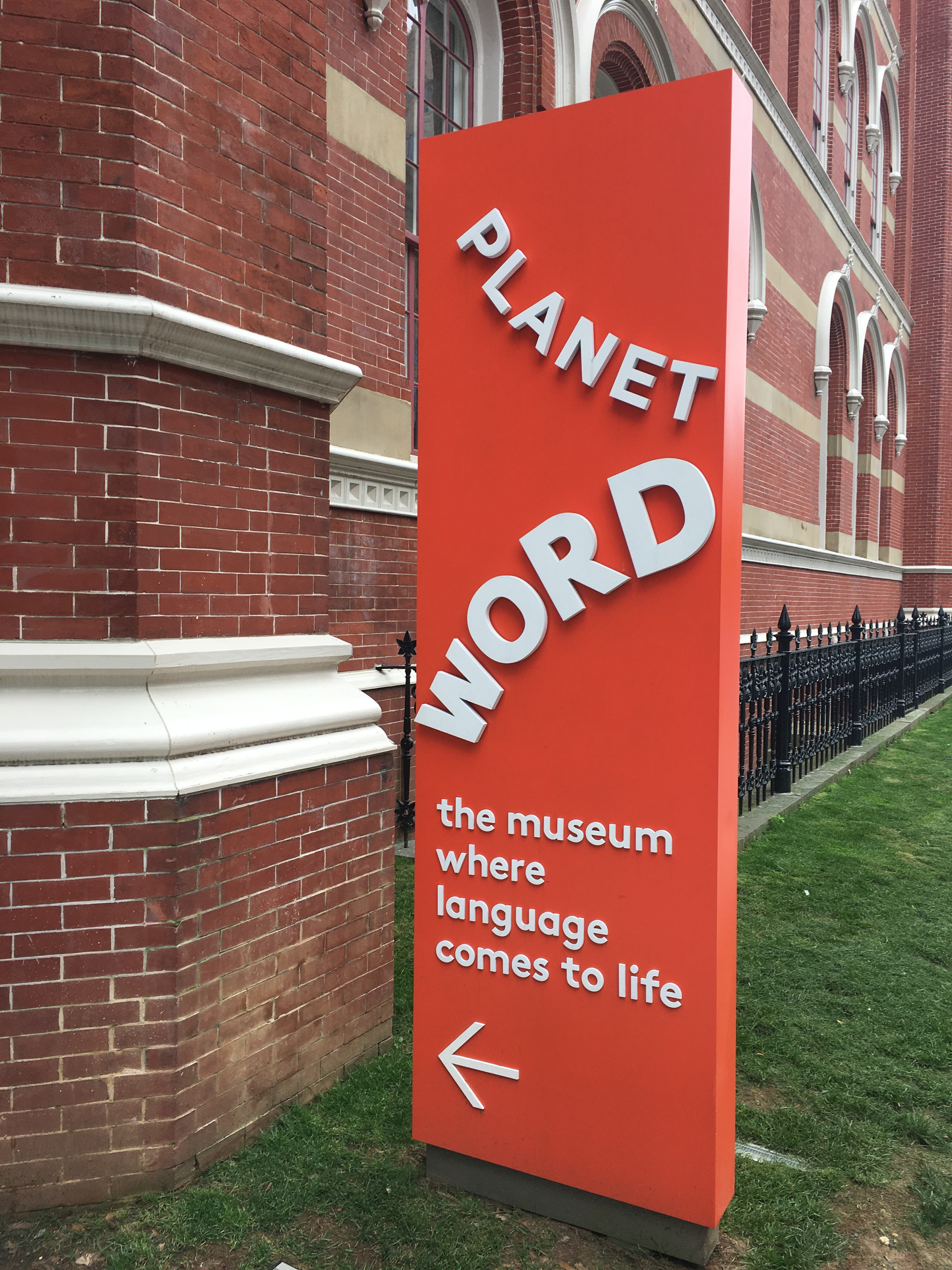
Planet Word Museum Entrance Washington DC

In 2017, Washington D.C. mayor Muriel E. Bowser selected Friedman and her team to restore the historic Franklin School building and repurpose the building into a new museum, Planet Word. The project was estimated to cost $50 million and Friedman committed $20 million of her own to the project.

The international architecture firm Beyer Blinder Belle was hired by Friedman to restore the Franklin School. The museum, 51,000-square-feet, features 10 galleries focused on interactive methods to teach museum patrons and visitors about language.

Friedman's idea for the museum was to create an entry-free museum using "technology to explore speech, literature, journalism and poetry."

Friedman said she was inspired to support and create the museum by her own teaching career and by the examples of the National Museum of Mathematics (New York City) founders and by Washington philanthropists David Rubenstein and the late Washington Wizards basketball team owner Abe Pollin.

Planet Word, which opened in October 2020 at a final cost of $60 million, will pay the city $10 a year on a 99-year lease.

=== Boards ===
Friedman is on the Board of the National Symphony Orchestra in Washington, D.C. as well as the SEED Foundation, which provides boarding school college-preparatory educational opportunities, and the Aspen Music Festival and School.

== Personal life ==
Friedman is married to author, reporter and columnist Thomas L. Friedman. The couple have two adult daughters.
