= Joan Busquets =

Spanish architect

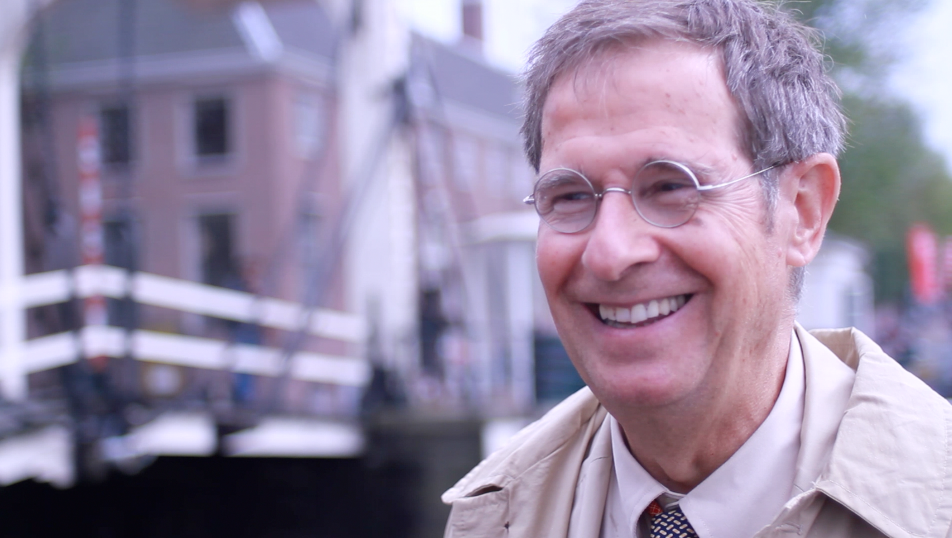
- Busquets in 2011.
- Born: Joan Busquets i Grau; July 26, 1946 (age 80); El Prat de Llobregat, Spain
- Education: Polytechnic University of Catalonia
- Occupation: Architect
- Awards: Erasmus Prize (2011)
- Practice: BAU Barcelona

Joan Busquets i Grau (born 26 July 1946 in El Prat de Llobregat) is a Spanish architect, urban planner, and educator. Busquets is the Martin Bucksbaum Professor in Practice of Urban Planning and Design at the Harvard University Graduate School of Design. He is founder of the architecture firm, BAU Barcelona. Busquets was awarded the 2011 Erasmus Prize, an annual award for exceptional contributions to European culture and society, "...in appreciation of his impressive and multifaceted oeuvre in the field of city planning."

== Career ==
Born in El Prat de Llobregat, a suburb of Barcelona, Busquets graduated from the Polytechnic University of Catalonia in 1969. He was Professor of Town Planning at the Polytechnic University of Catalonia from 1979 until 2002. Since 2002, he has been the first Martin Bucksbaum Professor in Practice of Urban Planning and Design at the Harvard University Graduate School of Design. He was a visiting professor at Harvard from 1989 to 1993 and in 1997.

Busquets headed the Planning Department of the Municipality of Barcelona from 1983 to 1989 and during the preparations for the 1992 Summer Olympics there.

== Awards ==
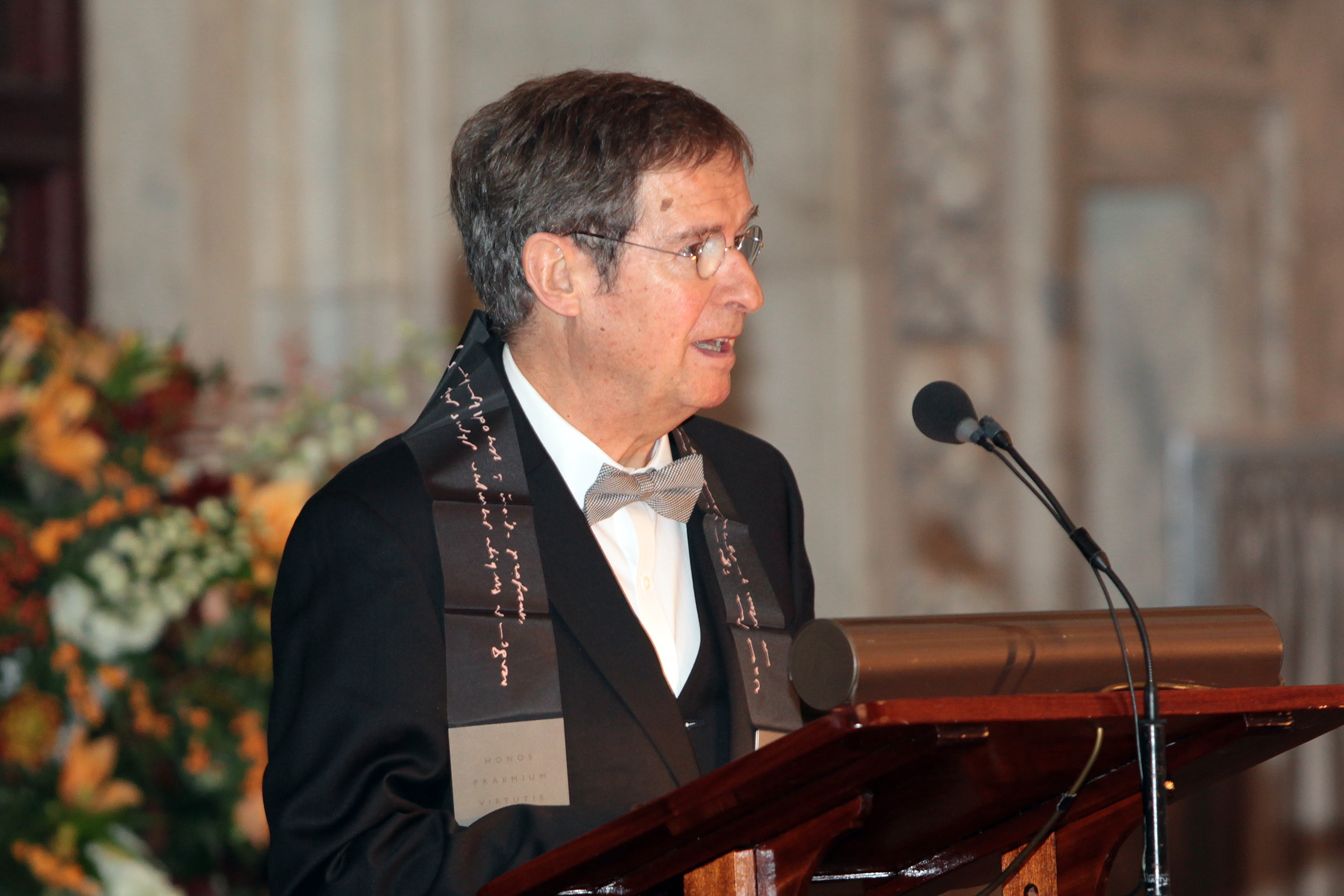
Busquets at the Erasmus Prize ceremony in 2011.

- Erasmus Prize (2011)
- Old seal of City of Trento, 2008
- The Catedra Lluis Barragán, TECM. Guadalajara Mexico, 2007
- ICSS Price for building the Chiado in Lisbon, 2001
- Premio Gubbio, European Prize, 2000
- National Award 1996 for the redevelopment plan for Toledo, 1996
- Spanish National Planning Award for a masterplan for Lerida, 1985
- Spanish National Planning Award for urban design for Sant Josep, Barcelona, 1981

== Works ==
- Toulouse City Center, Toulouse, France (2012-2017)
- A Coruña Masterplan, A Coruña, Spain (2008)
- Helmond City Center, Helmond, Netherlands (2005)
- Grotiusplaats, The Hague, Netherlands (1992–2005)
- Forum Viseu, Viseu, Portugal (2003–2005)
- Nesselande Community Center, Nesselande, Netherlands (2002)
- Maquinista Housing Complex, Barcelona, Spain (1998-2002)

== Bibliography ==
- Barcelona: Evolución urbanística de una ciudad compacta, 1992, ISBN 978-8476284582
- Barcelona, 1994, ISBN 978-8471005366
- La urbanización marginal, 1999, ISBN 978-8483013250
- Ciutat Vella de Barcelona: Un passat amb futur, 2004, ISBN 978-8476095669
- Urban Grids: Handbook for Regular City Design,2019, ISBN 978-1-940743-95-0
