= Buxbaum =

Buxbaum is a German surname meaning box tree. Notable people with the surname include:

- Franz Buxbaum (1900–1979), Austrian botanist
- Friedrich Buxbaum (1869–1948), Austrian cellist
- Helmuth Buxbaum (1939–2007), Prussian-born Canadian–American businessman, convict
- Johann Christian Buxbaum (1693–1730), German physician and botanist
- Joseph Buxbaum, American neuroscientist
- Josh Blake (born 1975), born Joshua Buxbaum, American actor
- Yitzhak Buxbaum (died 2020), American author and maggid

== See also ==
- Buchsbaum
- Bucksbaum
