= Planet Word =

Language arts museum in Washington DC, United States

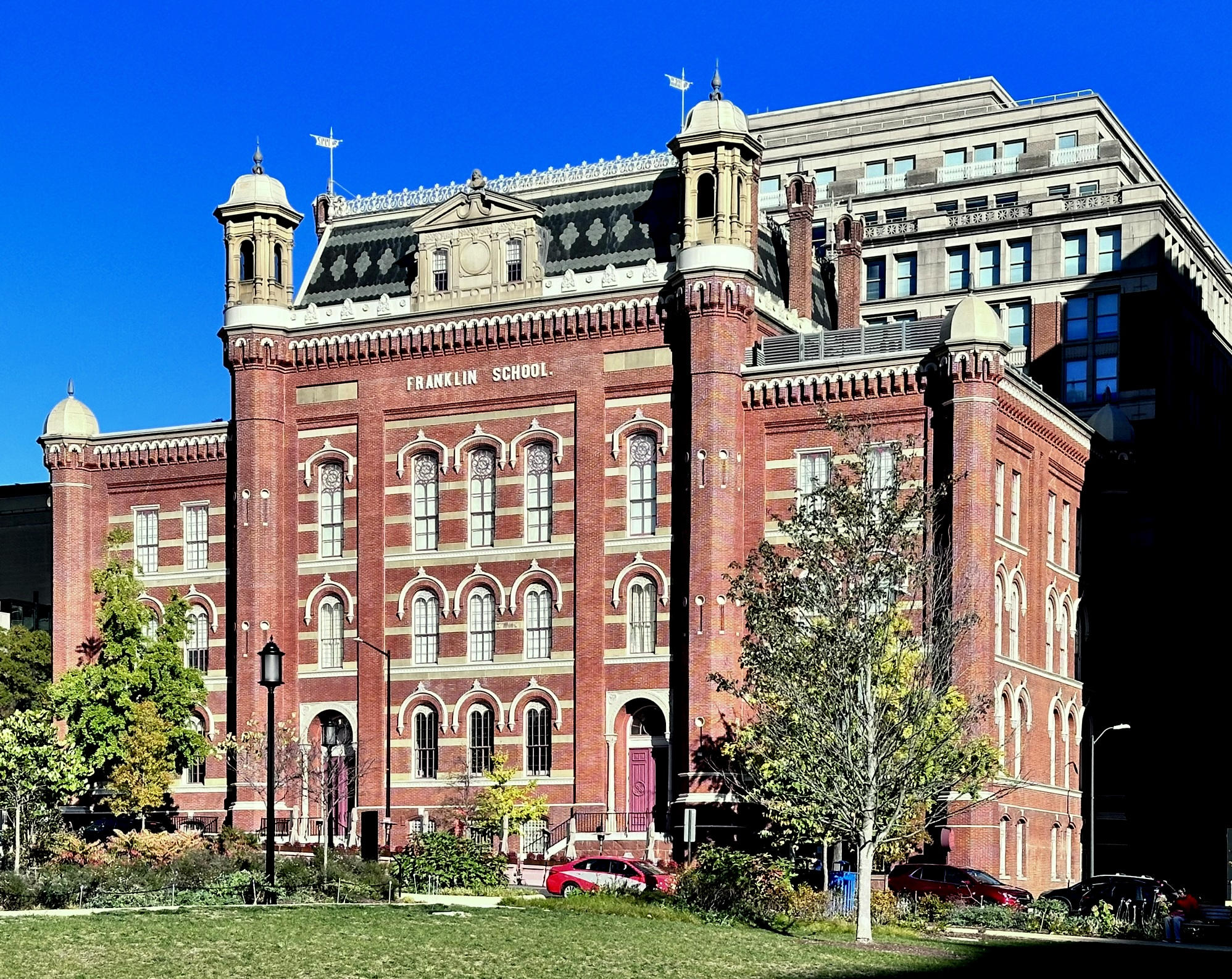
- Franklin School in 2023
- Established: October 21, 2020
- Location: 925 13th St, NW Washington, DC, US
- Coordinates: 38.90103°N 77.03001°W
- Type: Language museum
- Executive director: Nikki DeJesus Sertsu
- Website: https://planetwordmuseum.org/

Planet Word is a language arts museum that opened in Washington, DC, in October 2020. It is described as "the museum where language comes to life" and features interactive exhibits dedicated to topics such as the history of the English language, how children learn words, languages around the world, humor, poetry, and how music and advertising use words. It is located in the historic Franklin School building, designed by Adolf Cluss, located on Franklin Square at 13th and K Street.

The museum was created by Ann B. Friedman, a philanthropist and former reading teacher who is married to New York Times opinion columnist Thomas L. Friedman.

Initial building renovation began in 2017, and in 2018, work on the project was stopped after it was discovered that DC and US federal preservation rules were violated in the demolition of the building's interior. A "minimal" fine was paid, work on the project continued, and the museum opened on October 22, 2020.

Each exhibit focuses on a different aspect of spoken and/or signed language, with an emphasis on allowing visitors to speak or sign, manipulate, and interact with concepts. This ranges from an elaborate interactive room-sized globe to playful poetry written on bathroom walls.

Speaking Willow, an interactive, motion-detecting tree sculpture, is an exhibit created by Rafael Lozano-Hemmer that whispers to visitors in hundreds of different languages as they enter the museum. This interactive sculpture was delivered by Public Art Fund in collaboration with art foundry UAP.

Other notable exhibits within the museum include First Words, Where Do Words Come From?, and The Spoken Word. In March 2022, Planet Word opened Lexicon Lane, a permanent exhibit where visitors can solve language-related “cases”. Located on the third floor of the museum, the exhibit is set up to look like a small village, within which visitors have an hour to solve a mystery by figuring out the answers to language-related puzzles and riddles.

Cintas Corporation selected Planet Word as a finalist for the 2021 America’s Best Restroom Contest.

Since 2022, the North American School Scrabble Championship has been held at Planet Word. Walden Giezentanner, a seventh grader, and sixth grader Nathaniel Campos were winners at its first hosting.

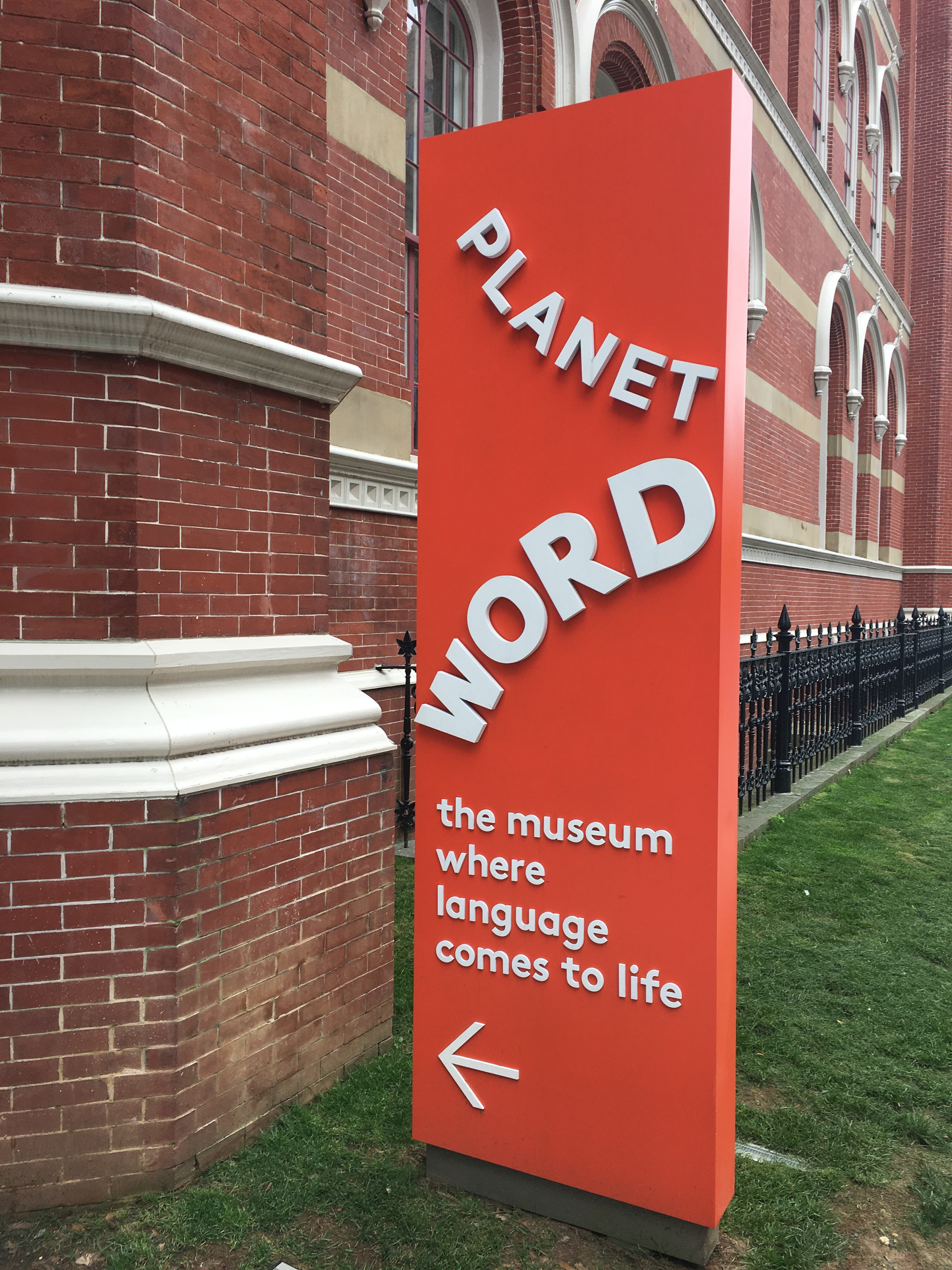
Sign at entrance

== See also ==
- Logology (linguistics)
