= Melva Bucksbaum =

American art collector

- Born: Melva Venezky; April 5, 1933; Washington, D.C., U.S.
- Died: August 16, 2015 (aged 82); Aspen, Colorado, U.S.
- Education: University of Maryland
- Occupations: Philanthropist, patron of the arts
- Spouse(s): Martin Bucksbaum; Robert I. Goldman; Raymond J. Learsy
- Children: 2 sons, 1 daughter
- Relatives: Matthew Bucksbaum (brother-in-law)

Melva Jane Bucksbaum (née Venezky; April 5, 1933 – August 16, 2015) was an American art collector, curator, and patron of the arts.

== Early life ==
Bucksbaum was born in Washington, D.C., on April 5, 1933, to William Venezky and Millie Ruth Venezky (née Bronstein), two Russian Jewish immigrants to the United States. Bucksbaum attended the University of Maryland.

== Philanthropy and art collection ==
Bucksbaum served as the president of the Des Moines Art Center board. In 1996, Bucksbaum and her family endowed the Martin Bucksbaum Professorship in Urban Planning and Design at the Graduate School of Design at Harvard University in memory of her late husband. Additionally, she established the Martin Bucksbaum Distinguished Lecture Series in Des Moines, Iowa at Drake University.

Bucksbaum began serving on the Whitney Museum of American Art's board of trustees in 1996 and eventually became its vice chairwoman. In 2000 she and her family inaugurated the Melva Bucksbaum Prize with an award of $100,000 to an individual contemporary artist and an exhibition of the artist's work at the Whitney.

Bucksbaum served on additional boards such as the International Council of the Museum of Modern Art in New York, the Woodrow Wilson International Center for Scholars in Washington, the Hirshorn Museum and Sculpture Garden in Washington, D.C., the American Friends of the Israel Museum in Jerusalem, the Aspen Institute, the Drawing Center in New York, the Jewish Museum in New York, and the International Committee of the Tate Gallery in London.

Bucksbaum collected over four hundred contemporary, impressionist, modernist and post-impressionist works, including pieces by Vanessa Beecroft, Gregory Crewdson, Nan Goldin, Robert Mapplethorpe, David Salle, Richard Serra, Terry Winters, Henri Matisse, Su-en Wong, and works by Peter Paul Rubens. In 2004–2005 Francesco Clemente painted a portrait of the couple.

== Personal life and death ==
Bucksbaum married Martin Bucksbaum in 1967. They had two sons, Gene and Glenn, and a daughter, Mary. He predeceased her in 1995, and she married Robert I. Goldman in 1998. In 2001 she married a third time to fellow Whitney trustee, Raymond J. Learsy.

Bucksbaum died at her home in Aspen, Colorado, from bladder cancer on August 16, 2015, at the age of 82. She is survived by her third husband as well as her sons, Gene and Glenn Bucksbaum; her daughter, Mary Bucksbaum Scanlan; her stepchildren, Bill and Peter Lese and Olexa Mandelbaum; seven grandchildren; and six step-grandchildren.
