= Franklin School (Washington, D.C.) =

- U.S. National Register of Historic Places
- U.S. National Historic Landmark
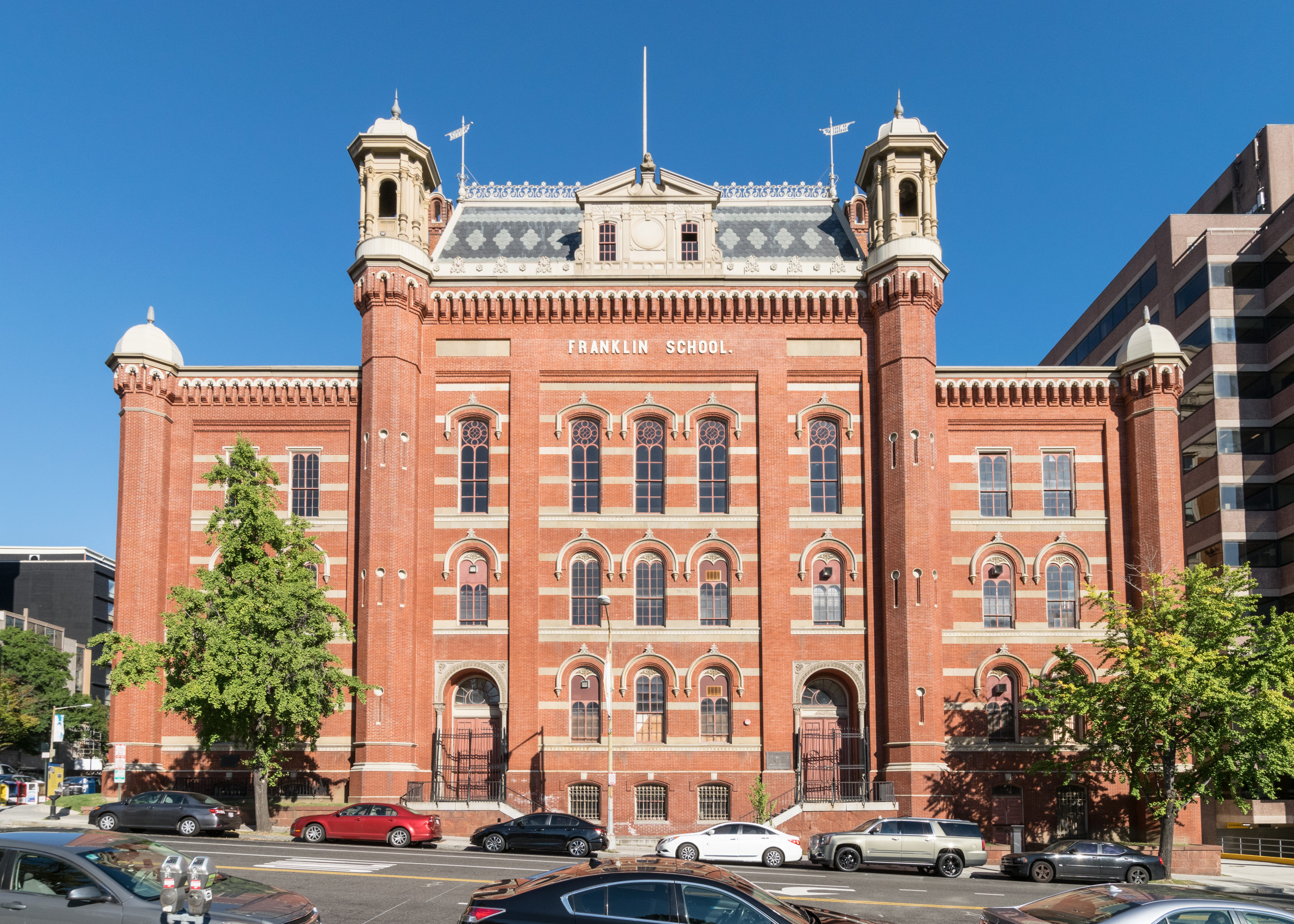

- Location within Central Washington, D.C. Location within the District of Columbia Location within the United States
- Location: 13th and K Sts., NW. Washington, D.C., U.S.
- Coordinates: 38°54′8″N 77°1′47″W
- Built: 1865
- Architect: Adolf Cluss
- NRHP reference No.: 73002085

Significant dates
- Added to NRHP: April 11, 1973
- Designated NHL: June 19, 1996

The Franklin School is a building designed by Adolf Cluss in the German round-arch style, located on Franklin Square at 13th and K Streets in Washington, D.C. It was constructed in 1869 and initially served as a flagship school building. It later took on various other educational roles, and became a homeless shelter in the 2000s. In 2020, it became the location of the Planet Word museum after its interior was largely gutted.

== History ==
Built in 1869, the Franklin School was the flagship building of eight modern urban public school buildings constructed in Washington, D.C., between 1862 and 1875 to house, for the first time, a comprehensive system of universal public education.

In addition to being an admired educational facility, a small plaque on its exterior describes the building's place in the history of telecommunications, noting Alexander Graham Bell's first wireless communication in 1880, where a beam of light was used to transmit a voice message using his newly invented Photophone. Bell's laboratory was nearby on L Street, and his work was a pioneering step in optical communications, the forerunner of fiber-optic communication systems that now carry most of the world's telecommunications traffic. Bell was also a well-known educator who taught at a special day school for deaf children, who trained teachers of the deaf, and who additionally created an institution for the study of deafness (also in Washington, D.C.).

The prominence Franklin School enjoyed was highlighted in the 1870s, when studied in international expositions held in Vienna, Paris, and Philadelphia. It was declared a National Historic Landmark in 1996.

In 2002, the building was used as a homeless shelter, which controversially closed in September 2008. It was briefly occupied by protesters associated with the Occupy movement on November 19, 2011 In February 2015, Mayor Muriel Bowser cancelled the planned conversion of the school to a public facility for art exhibitions, lectures and educational activities by the Institute for Contemporary Expression. Approved by Bowser's predecessor, Vincent Gray, the project involved a privately funded conversion of the school and had its first event planned for September 2015. As of October 2015, proposals were still being considered.

On January 25, 2017, it was announced that the building would host a museum of linguistics called Planet Word, led by Ann B. Friedman, philanthropist and wife of The New York Times columnist Tom Friedman. In 2018, work on the project was stopped after it was discovered that D.C. and U.S. federal preservation rules were violated in the destruction of the building's interior. A "minimal" fine was paid, work on the project continued and the museum opened "under a significant cloud" on October 22, 2020.

== Design ==
Cluss described its architecture as "modern Renaissance", but its origins are in the German rounded arch style, known as Rundbogenstil. A bust of Benjamin Franklin adorns the building's facade. The building's Great Hall was designed to seat 1,000 people and was a resource for community concerts, exhibitions, and public meetings. Franklin is one of thirteen buildings in Washington, D.C. to receive "interior landmark protection."

The location of the school in a prominent neighborhood was intended to bring attention to age-graded, separate but equal classrooms for boys and girls. Offices for the Superintendent and the Board of Education were also housed in the Franklin School allowing administrators to see the benefits of the new educational system. The building also used big windows for light, roomy and airy spaces to enhance the learning environment.

== See also ==
- List of National Historic Landmarks in Washington, D.C.
- National Register of Historic Places listings in central Washington, D.C.
