= Downtown (Washington, D.C.) =

Coordinates: 38°54′9″N 77°1′58.3″W

- Downtown Historic District
- U.S. National Register of Historic Places
- U.S. Historic district
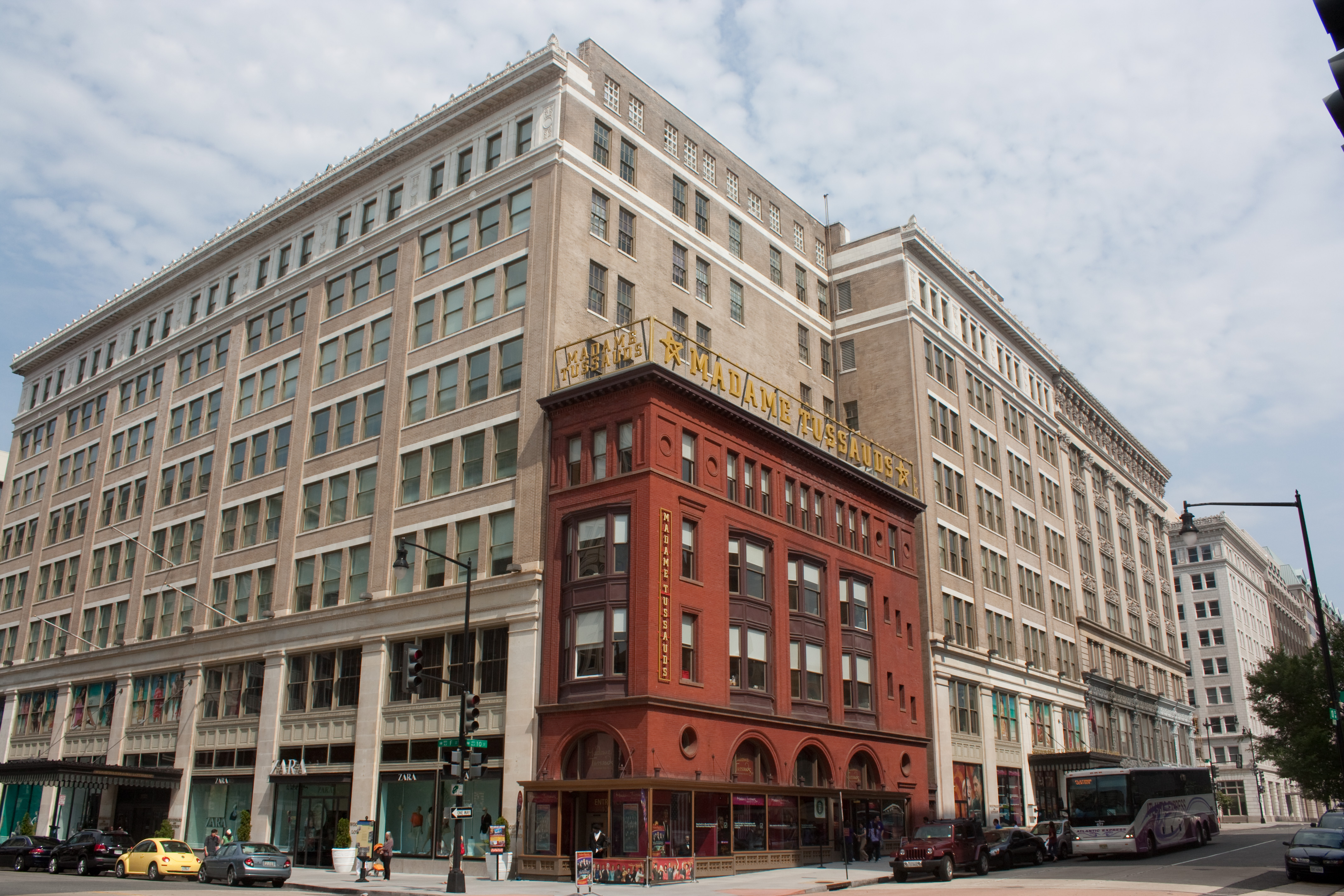

- Location within the District of Columbia Location within the United States

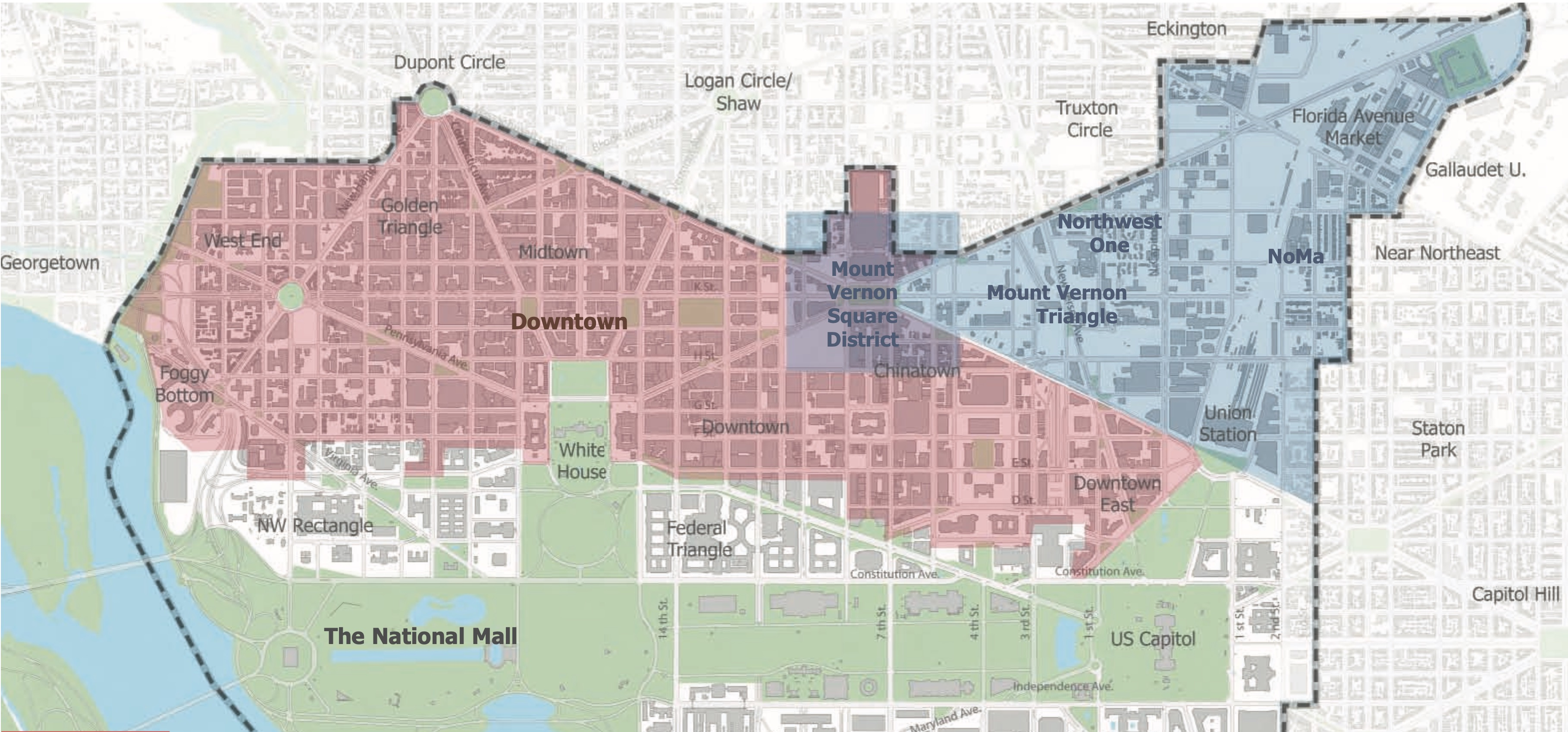
- Pink area was designated in 2008 as "existing Downtown areas of Washington, D.C.; blue indicated then-emerging areas of Center City Washington.
- Location: Roughly, 7th St. from Pennsylvania Avenue to Mt. Vernon Sq., and F St. between 11th and 7th Sts., NW, Washington, D.C.
- Area: 50 acres (20 ha)
- Architect: Multiple
- Architectural style: Late 19th And 20th Century Revivals, Late Victorian
- NRHP reference No.: 84003901
- Added to NRHP: September 22, 2001

Downtown is the central business district of Washington, D.C., located in Northwest D.C. It is the third largest central business district in the United States. The "Traditional Downtown" has been defined as an area roughly between Union Station in the east and 16th Street NW in the west, and between the National Mall on the south and Massachusetts Avenue on the north, including Penn Quarter. However, nowadays, Downtown D.C. can often refer to a larger area, as the DC Office of Planning states:

…most residents, workers, and visitors think of Downtown in a broader sense — including areas as far north as Dupont Circle, as far west as Foggy Bottom, and as far east as Capitol Hill. Only about half of the central city workforce is located within the city’s traditional Downtown.

A small portion of this area is known as the Downtown Historic District and was listed on the NRHP in 2001.

== Geography and subdistricts ==
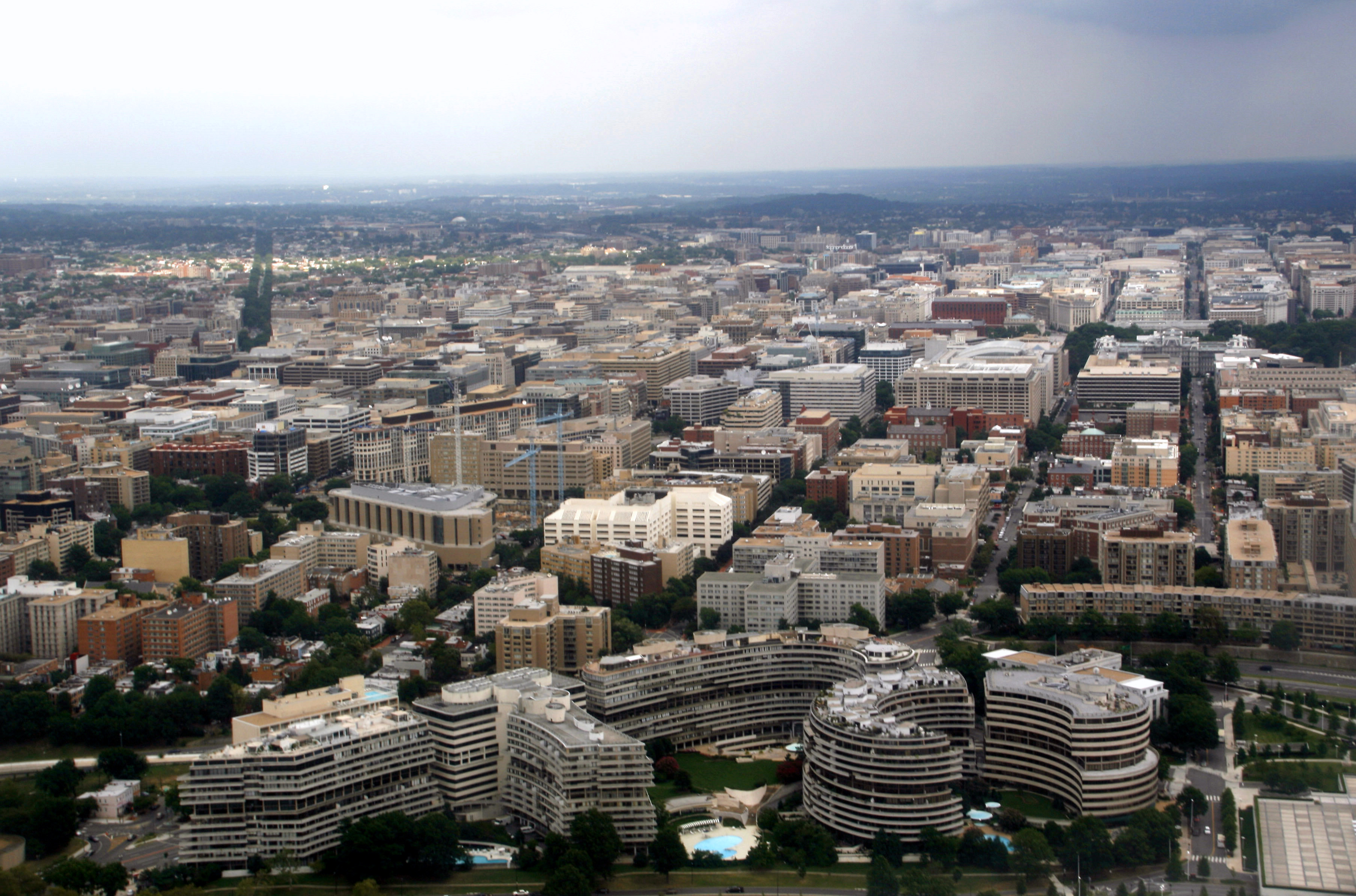
Aerial view of Foggy Bottom, which the Washington D.C. Planning Department includes in its broader definition of Downtown Washington, D.C.

The Washington, D.C. government does not officially define neighborhoods or neighborhood boundaries, so there are varying definitions of which areas constitute Downtown D.C. or the central business district of D.C.

In a 2008 map, the city's planning department showed as existing Downtown areas a broad swath of everything between Georgetown on the west and Union Station on the east, with a northern boundary of and Massachusetts Avenue, and a southern boundary, roughly, of E Street, thus including the West End, Foggy Bottom, Golden Triangle, Traditional Downtown, Chinatown, Mount Vernon Square, and Downtown East.

This diamond-shaped area stretches from Union Station in the east, south to the National Mall, northwest past the White House to Washington Circle in Foggy Bottom and northeast to DuPont Circle. It includes not only the Traditional Downtown and the Golden Triangle (which is the southern part of DuPont Circle neighborhood), but also West End and Foggy Bottom.

=== Traditional Downtown ===
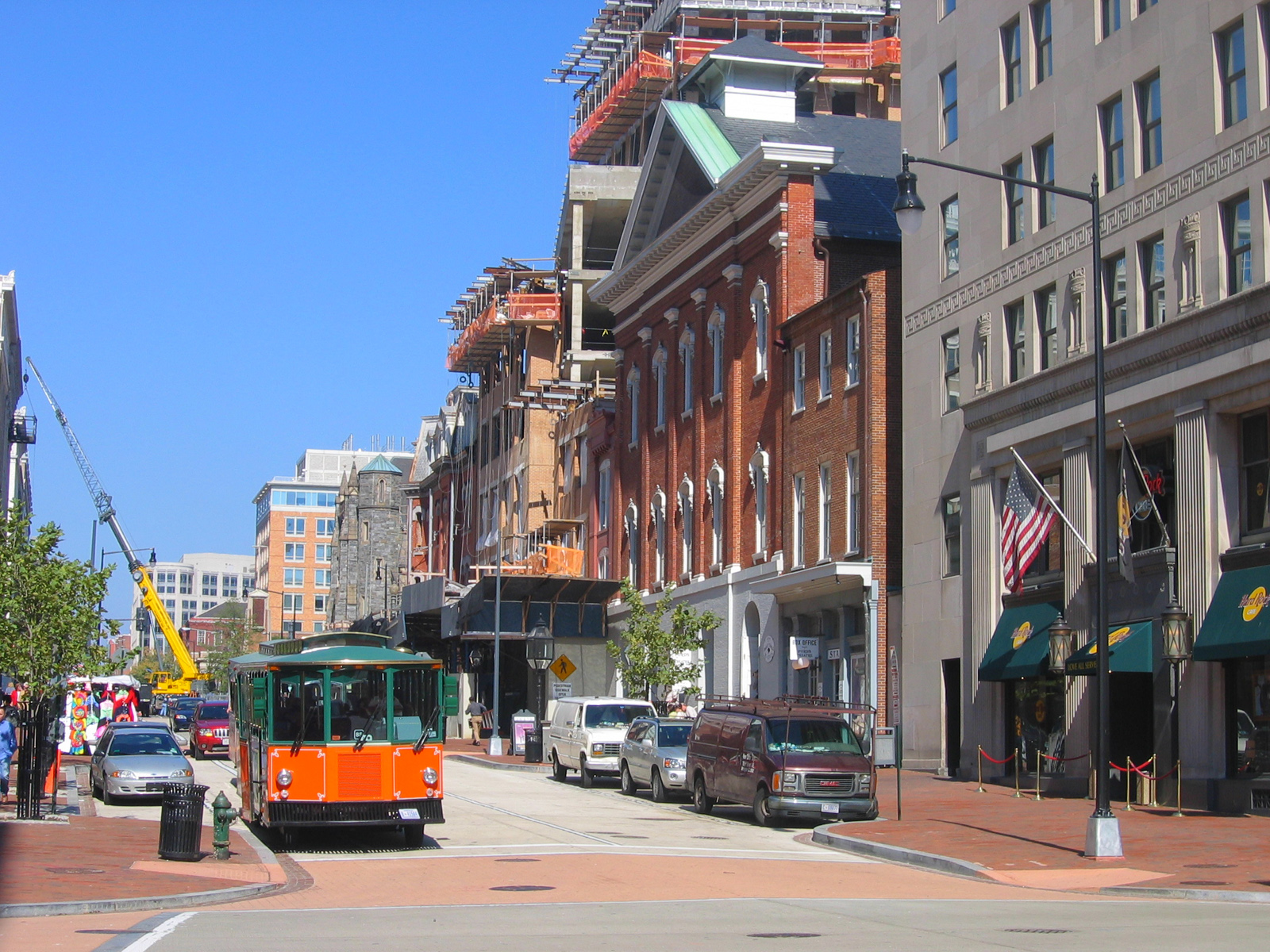
Ford's Theatre on 10th St. NW, part of the traditional Downtown

The Downtown BID boundaries roughly conform with the more traditional definitions of Downtown and those of the Downtown Urban Renewal Action Area and are:

- North-northeast: Massachusetts Avenue, N.W. and the Mount Vernon Triangle, Mount Vernon Square, Shaw, and Logan Circle neighborhoods,
- East: North Capitol Street, N.W. and Louisiana Avenue, N.W. (roughly Union Station), and the Capitol Hill neighborhood,
- South: east of 6th Street, N.W., by Constitution Avenue, N.W. and the National Mall, and west of 6th Street, N.W., by Pennsylvania Avenue, N.W. and Federal Triangle
- West: 15th and 16th streets, N.W. (roughly, the White House grounds) – to the west of the White House is the Golden Triangle BID –

The Downtown BID thus encompasses Penn Quarter, Chinatown, CityCenterDC, and the F Street shopping district.

=== Golden Triangle ===
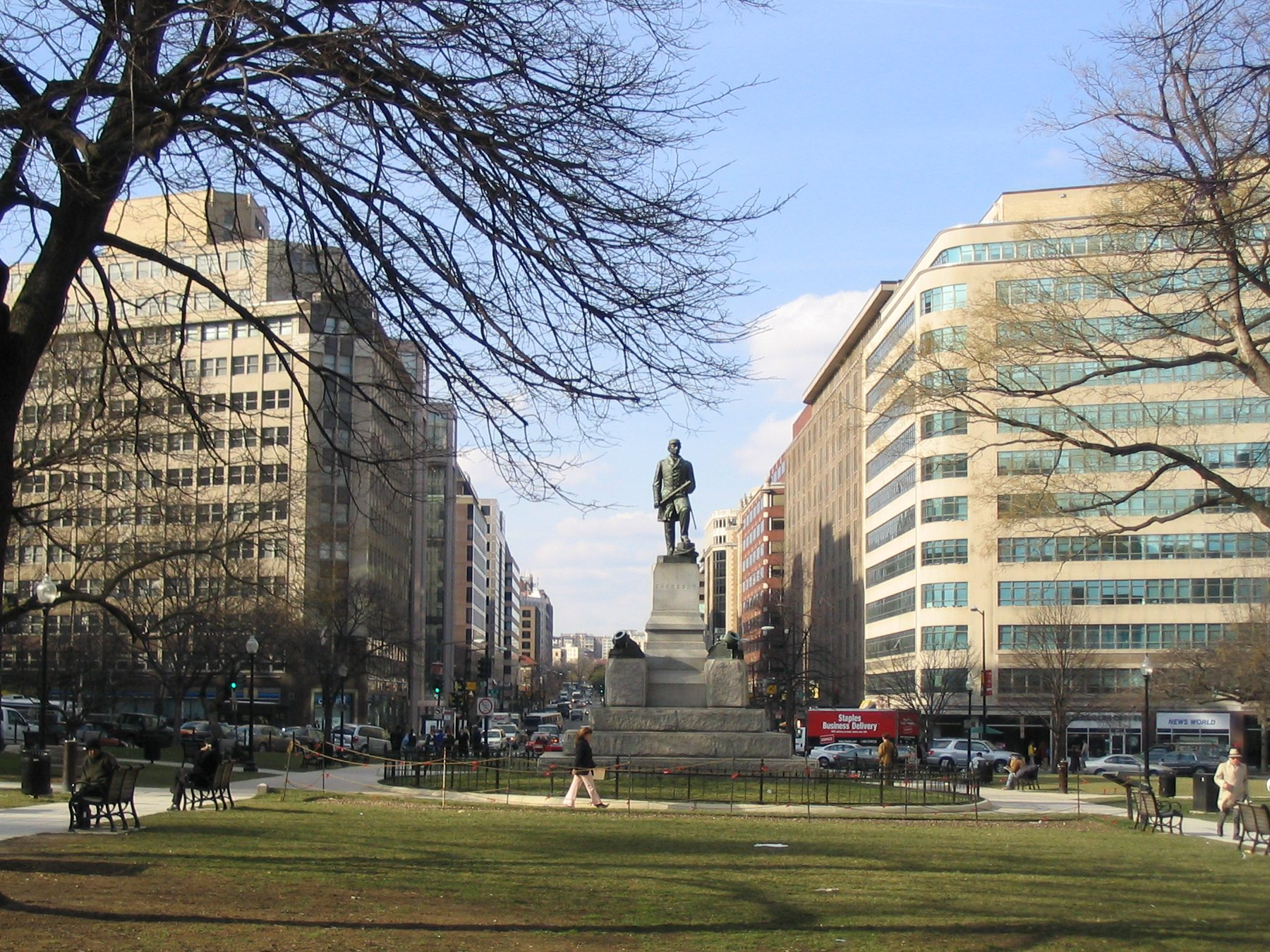
Farragut Square Park, in the Golden Triangle

The Golden Triangle is an area defined by the Golden Triangle Business Improvement District (BID). It is part of a larger Downtown area according to The Washington Post and DC Department of Planning. The Golden Triangle boundaries are, very roughly:

- Northwest: New Hampshire Ave., N.W., and the DuPont Circle neighborhood,
- Northeast: Massachusetts Ave., N.W., and the DuPont Circle neighborhood,
- East: 16th Street, N.W. and the DowntownDC BID,
- Southwest: Pennsylvania Avenue, N.W. and the Foggy Bottom neighborhood,
- West: 21st Street, N.W., and the Foggy Bottom and the West End neighborhoods.

== Character, attractions, and services ==
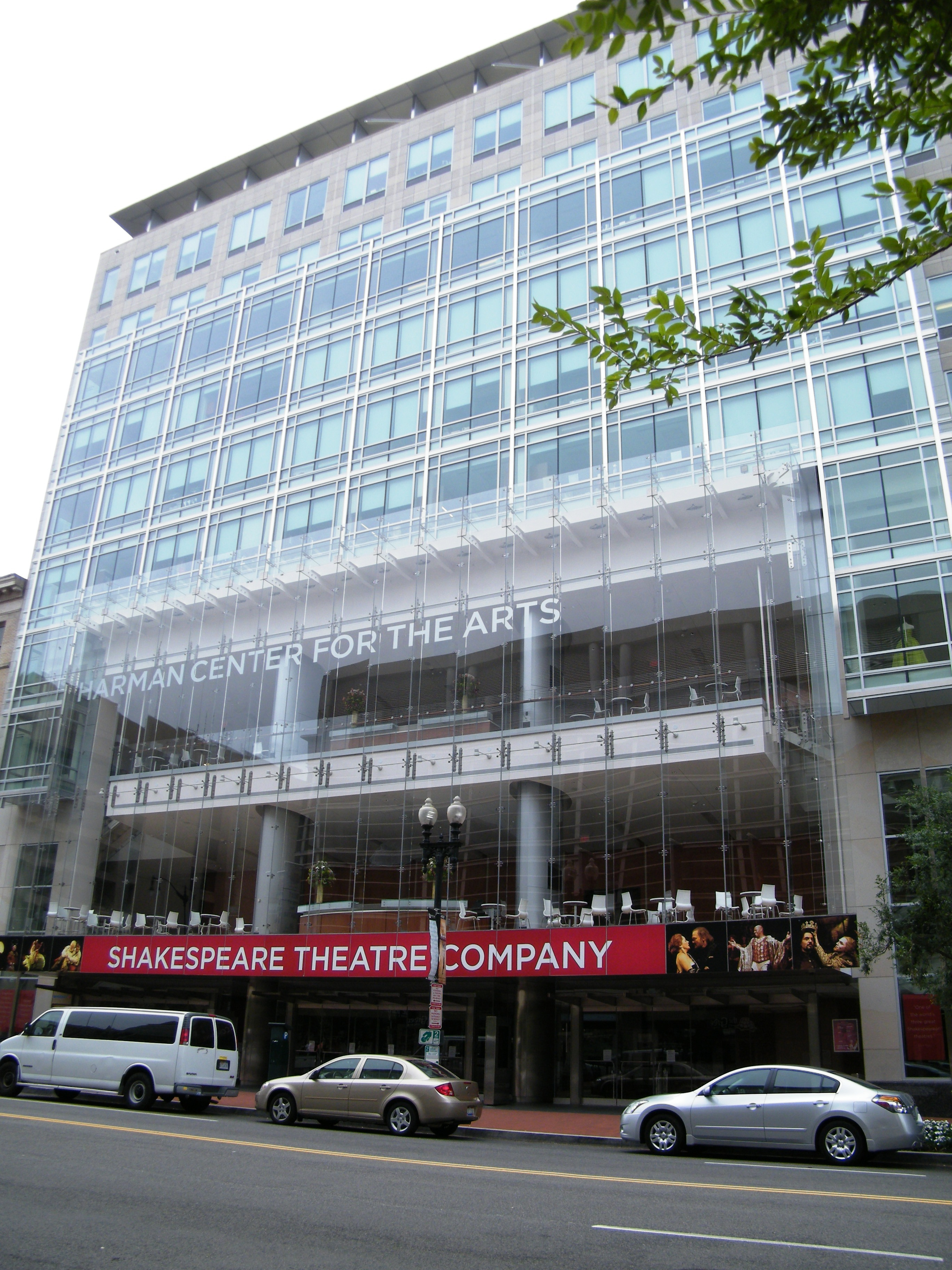
The Shakespeare Theatre Company has a theatre located in Penn Quarter.

By the 1990s and continuing into the 2010s, the core of the downtown district was almost exclusively commercial, and its primary commercial use was as office buildings. The area also featured a number of attractions, including museums (such as the International Spy Museum, National Aquarium, National Archives, National Building Museum, National Museum of Women in the Arts, National Portrait Gallery, Newseum, and Smithsonian American Art Museum) and theaters (such as Ford's Theatre, National Theatre, Shakespeare Theatre, Warner Theatre, and Woolly Mammoth Theatre). The Penn Quarter and Chinatown areas in particular are home to many bars and restaurants, and the observation deck in the tower of the Old Post Office Pavilion is known for its views of the city. 7th Street NW between H and F Streets NW—a short commercial strip known as "Gallery Place"—has become a major hub of bars, restaurants, theaters, and upscale retail shops.

However, even as late as 2010, most of the core area tended to be empty of pedestrian foot traffic at night, except for streets immediately around theaters and restaurants. Downtown D.C. has been adding residents, however, and pedestrian traffic at night is increasing. In 1990, the area had about 4,000 residents, but this had increased to 8,449 by 2010. Such increases appear small, but are more significant than they seem because the city's height restrictions limit population density. The completion of the $950 million CityCenterDC project in late 2013 is estimated to add another 1,000 or more residents. One exception to the low nighttime foot traffic is Gallery Place, where large crowds gather day and night, especially after sporting events at the Capital One Arena. Crime and street brawls increased in the area and its adjacent Gallery Place Metro station between 2008 and 2010, primarily due to the large groups of teenagers from across the metropolitan area gathering there.

Notable downtown restaurants include Fogo de Chão, Loeb's NY Deli, Old Ebbitt Grill, and Wok 'n' Roll (located in the Mary E. Surratt Boarding House). Many restaurants are concentrated in the relatively small areas of Chinatown and Gallery Place.

Capital One Arena (originally MCI Center, later Verizon Center), a major basketball, hockey, and events venue, opened on Mount Vernon Square in 1997. It proved to be a major attraction, drawing more than 20 million visitors in its first decade of operation.

Union Station anchors downtown on the east and besides serving as a hub for Amtrak, VRE and MARC suburban rail, Metro rail and buses, was also an important shopping and dining destination from 1988 until 2020, the COVID-19 pandemic in Washington, D.C. forced most tenants to close. As of 2022, authorities are considering plans for renovation and new construction over the railyards behind the station connecting it to the burgeoning NoMa neighborhood.

=== Cityscape ===
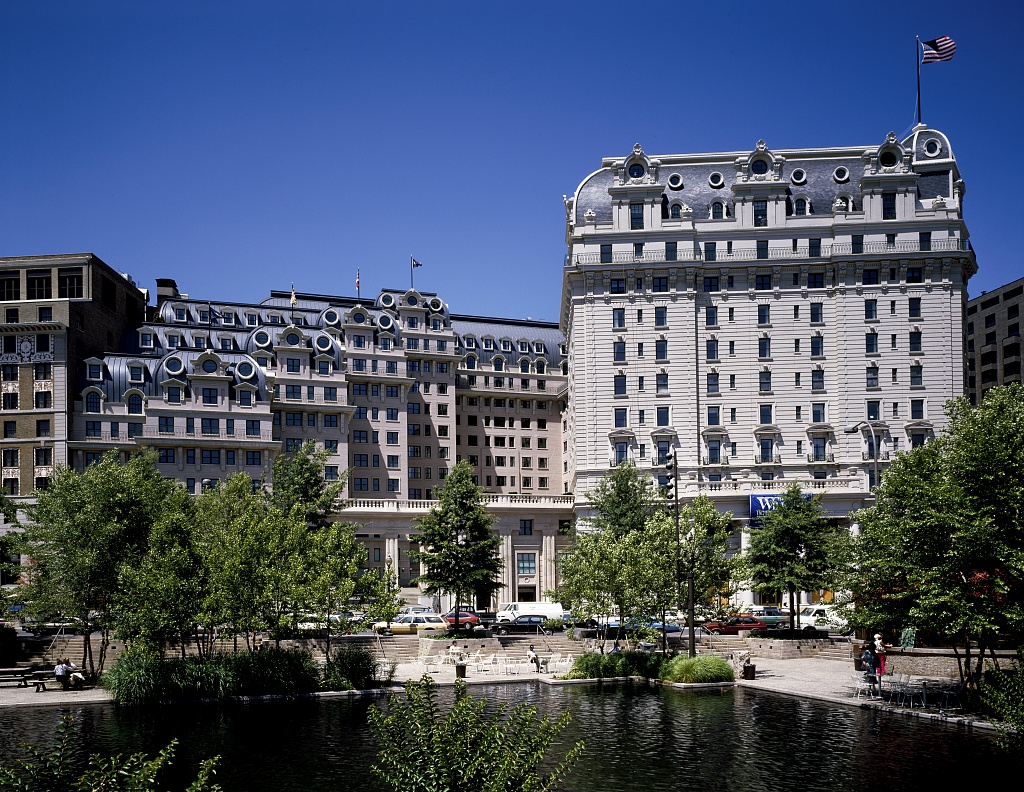
The Willard Hotel was designed in the Beaux-Arts style.

The majority of downtown Washington is composed of office buildings of varying architectural styles. The oldest tend to be of the Federal school, as are the White House, the Treasury Building, Blair House, and the rowhouses that line Lafayette Square. Others run the gamut from Neoclassical (such as the buildings at Federal Triangle) to Second Empire-style (the Eisenhower Executive Office Building) to postmodern (One Farragut Square South and Franklin Tower at 1401 I Street NW). The historic Willard Hotel was built in the Beaux-Arts style.

==== Height restriction ====
This 2007 aerial view of Downtown D.C. shows the low height of buildings due to the city's height restrictions.

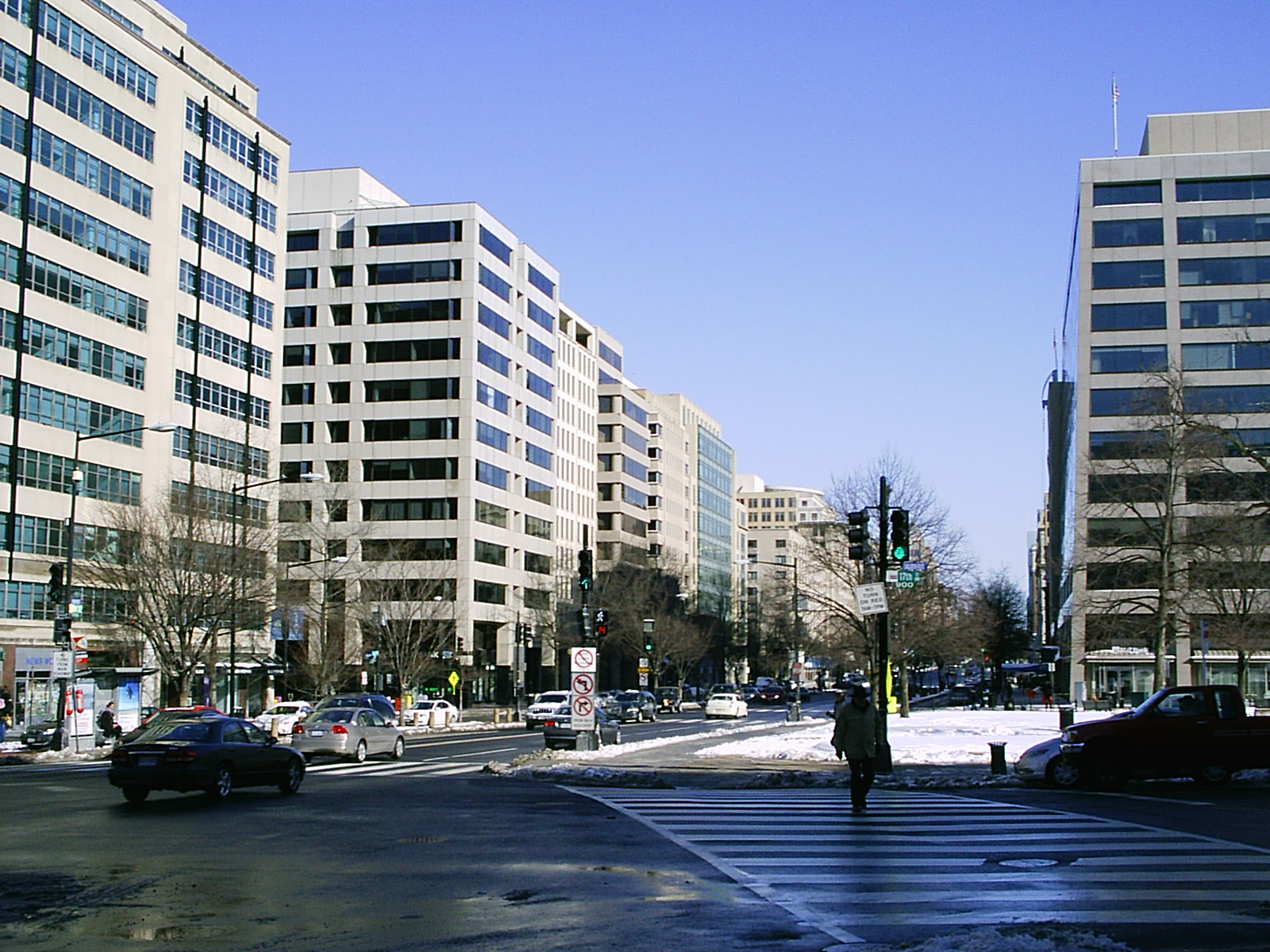
The intersection of K and 17th streets in Downtown Washington

Unlike other large cities in the U.S., Washington's downtown has a low skyline. With the advent of the skyscraper and the construction of the Cairo Hotel, residents were concerned that the city's European feel might be dwarfed by high-rise buildings. Congress therefore passed the Heights of Buildings Act in 1899, limiting any new building in Washington to a height of 110 feet (34 m). The act was amended in 1910 to allow buildings 20 feet (6.1 m) higher than the width of the adjacent street.

As of 2006, the tallest building in downtown Washington—excluding the Washington Monument, U.S. Capitol, Washington National Cathedral, and the Basilica of the National Shrine of the Immaculate Conception, all of which are outside of the downtown district—is the Old Post Office Pavilion, whose 315-foot (96 m) tall clock tower looms far above other nearby structures. The tallest commercial building is One Franklin Square, at 210 feet (64 m).

=== Parks and public squares ===
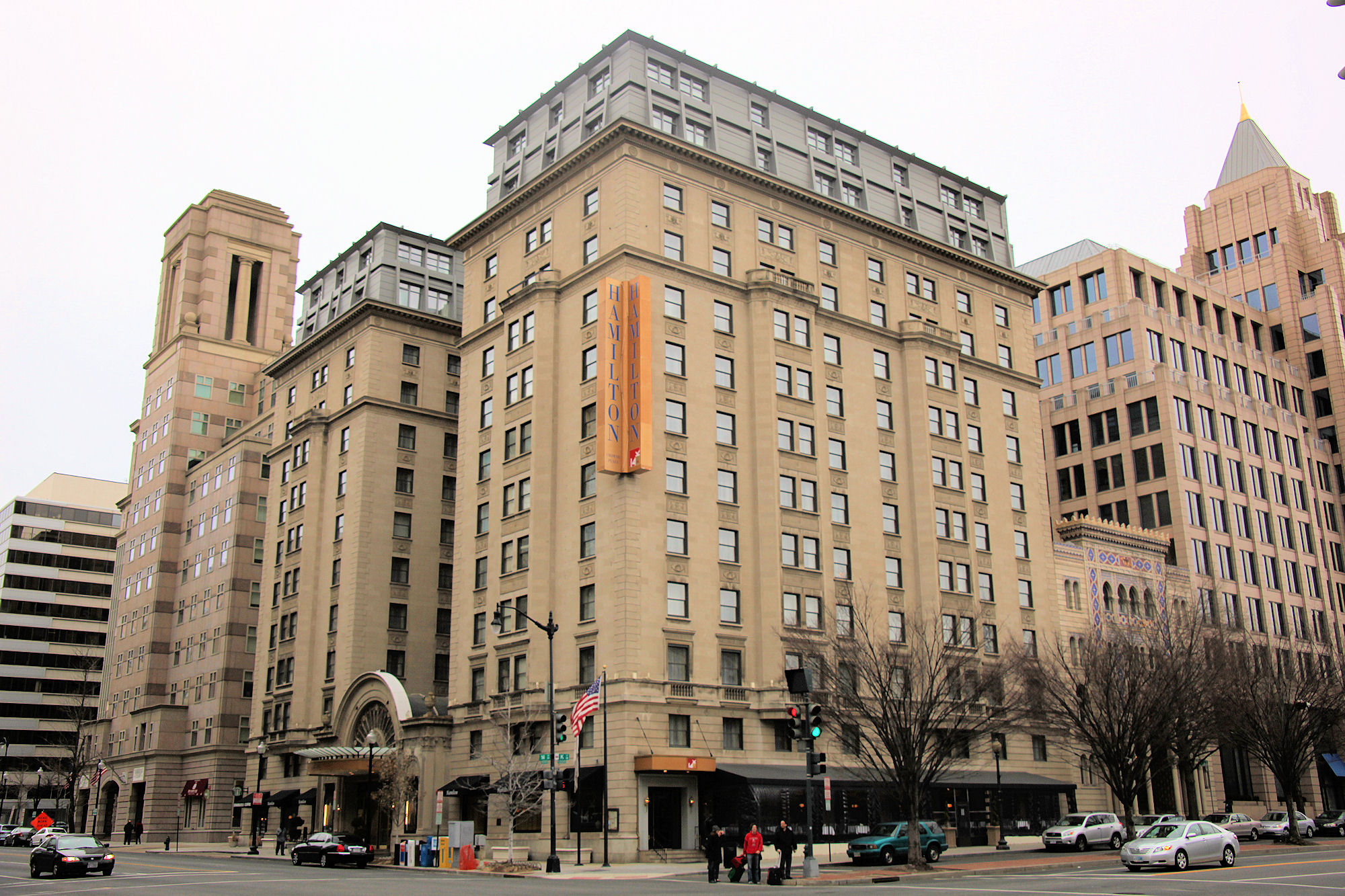
The Hamilton Hotel located off Franklin Square in Downtown Washington

A number of public urban parks exist in the downtown area. Among the more prominent are: Farragut Square, Franklin Square, Judiciary Square, Lafayette Square (the portion of President's Park north of the White House), McPherson Square, Mount Vernon Square, the National World War I Memorial (formerly Pershing Park), Scott Circle, Thomas Circle, and Washington Circle.

The largest paved square in the city, Freedom Plaza, is located on Pennsylvania Avenue NW between 13th and 14th Streets NW. The city pedestrianized a two-block-long stretch of 16th Street NW closest to the White House as Black Lives Matter Plaza and pedestrianized it in 2020, during the series of George Floyd protests taking place in the city.

== Governance ==
Two business improvement districts cover the downtown D.C. area. The Downtown DC Business Improvement District (Downtown DC BID) is bounded by 16th Street NW, Massachusetts Avenue NW, and Constitution Avenue NW, and is funded by a voluntary tax provided by 825 businesses in the area. The Golden Triangle Business Improvement District (Golden Triangle BID) is bounded by 16th Street NW, Massachusetts Avenue NW, 21st Street NW, and Pennsylvania Avenue NW. Both BIDs work to enhance the diversity of business in their respective jurisdictions as well as the quality of life by providing directions for tourists, improving street and sidewalk cleanliness, and advising police about potential or existing problems.

Various federal (Federal Protective Service, Federal Bureau of Investigation, Secret Service, United States Mint Police, United States Park Police, etc.), city (Metropolitan Police Department of the District of Columbia, District of Columbia Housing Authority Office of Public Safety), and regional (Metro Transit Police Department) law enforcement agencies have concurrent, overlapping jurisdiction in Downtown D.C. Both BIDs in the area also provide semi-uniformed unsworn police forces, which help to maintain order and provide street intelligence by communicating via cell phone with the Metropolitan Police Department and Metro Transit Police. D.C. Housing Authority Police do not have jurisdiction outside public housing, but do patrol Gallery Place to pick up and provide intelligence on the activities of youth congregating there who live in city-provided housing units.

== Education ==
=== Higher education ===
The George Washington University, Foggy Bottom Campus.

== See also ==
- Architecture of Washington, D.C.

== Bibliography ==
- Bednar, Michael J. L' Enfant's Legacy: Public Open Spaces in Washington, D.C. Baltimore, Md.: Johns Hopkins University Press, 2006.
- Dempsey, John S. and Forst, Linda S. An Introduction to Policing. Clifton Park, N.Y.: Delmar Cengage Learning, 2012.
- Dickey, Jeff. The Rough Guide to Washington, D.C. New York: Penguin, 2011.
- Ford, Elise Hartment. Frommer's Washington, D.C., from $80 a Day. Hoboken, N.J.: Frommer's, 2004.
- Gutheim, Frederick A. and Lee, Antointte J. Worthy of the Nation: Washington, D.C., From L'Enfant to the National Capital Planning Commission. Baltimore, Md.: Johns Hopkins University Press, 2006.
- Jabado, Salwa. Fodor's 2010 Washington, D.C. New York: Fodor's, 2010.
- Manning, Peter K. "The United States of America." In Plural Policing: A Comparative Perspective. Trevor Jones and Tim Newburn, eds. New York: Psychology Press, 2006.
- McGregor, James H. Washington From the Ground Up, Cambridge, Mass.: Belknap Press of Harvard University Press, 2007.
- Minetor, Randi and Minetor, Nic. Washington, D.C.: A Guided Tour Through History. Guilford, Conn.: GPP Travel, 2009.
- Smith, Bruce R.; Pistolesi, Andrea; and Kelly, Michael T. Art and History of Washington D.C. Florence, Italy: Bonechi, 2007.
