= Hamilton Hotel (Washington, D.C.) =

- U.S. National Register of Historic Places
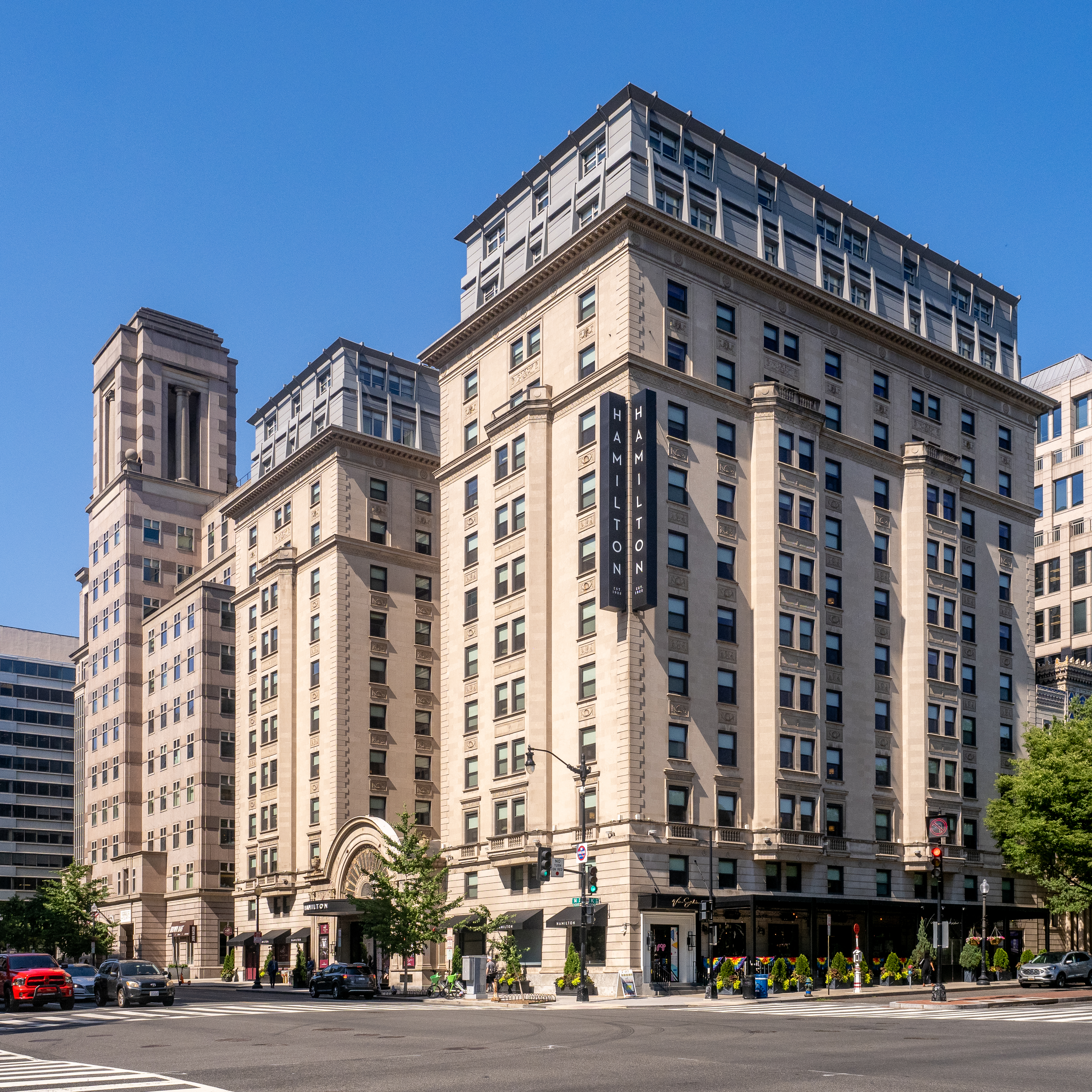
- Hamilton Hotel in 2024

- Location within Washington, D.C.
- Location: 1001 14th Street, N.W., Washington, D.C.
- Coordinates: 38°54′10″N 77°1′53″W
- Built: 1922
- Architect: Jules Henri de Sibour
- Architectural style: Beaux-Arts
- NRHP reference No.: 12001194
- Added to NRHP: April 17, 2013

The Hamilton Hotel is a AAA 4-diamond hotel in downtown Washington, D.C., United States, located at 1001 14th Street, N.W., just to the north of Franklin Square. It is a member of Historic Hotels of America, the official program of the National Trust for Historic Preservation.

== History ==
=== First Hamilton Hotel ===
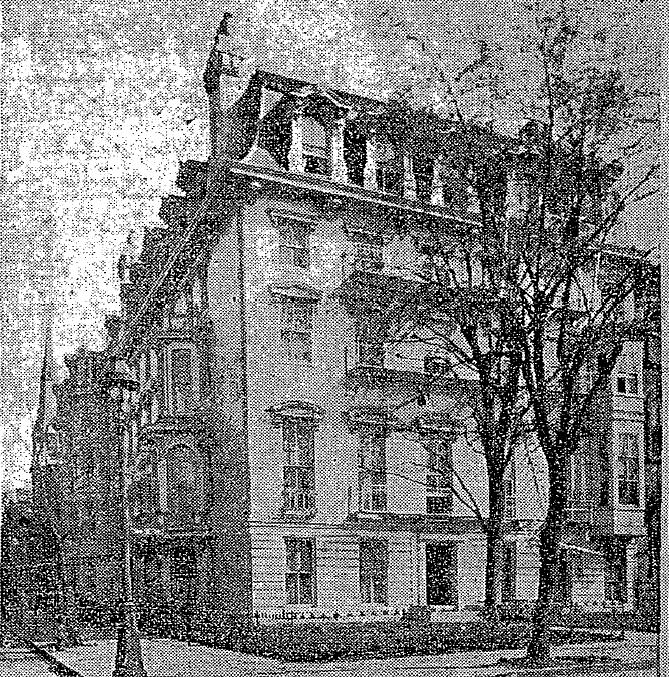
Hamilton Hotel, 1911

The first Hamilton Hotel building was constructed in 1851 as the Rugby Academy, a private school. By 1862, the structure had been converted to a hotel, Rugby House. In the late 1860s, it was purchased by naval officer Horatio Bridge and his wife, who lived at the hotel. They renamed it Hamilton House, in honor of Mrs. Bridge's late friend Eliza Hamilton Holly, the daughter of founding father Alexander Hamilton. The hotel was leased for ten years each to Mrs. M.J. Colley in 1872 and then in 1882 to William M. Gibson, owner of the nearly Ebbitt House Hotel. Owner Charlotte Bridge expanded the property in 1895 by purchasing an adjacent plot. On her death in 1907, the Hamilton Hotel was sold to William Little. The hotel was sold again a month later to Irving O. Ball.

=== Modern Hamilton Hotel ===
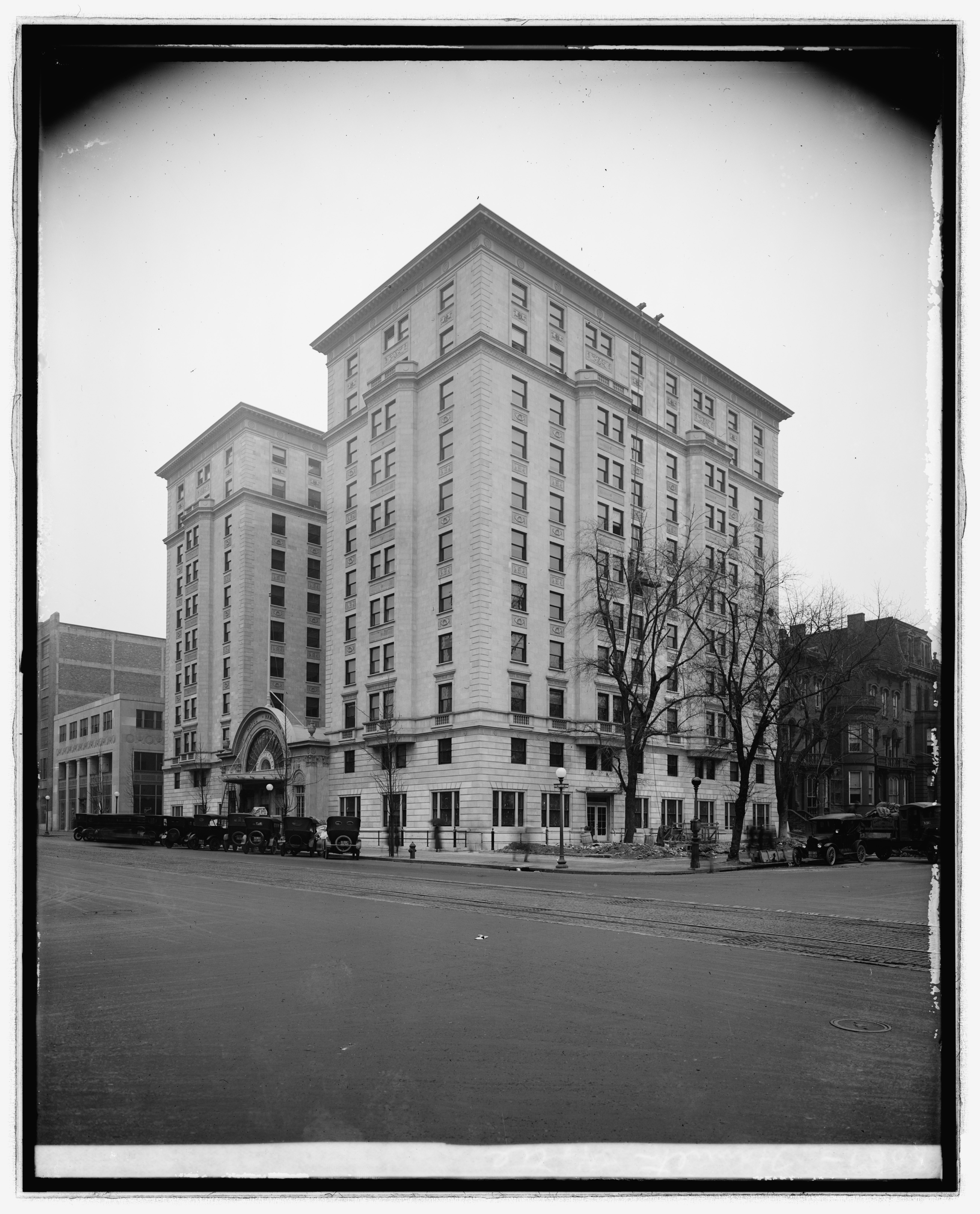
Hotel Hamilton, 1922

The hotel was sold to Felix Lake in June 1921, for $450,000. He announced plans to demolish it and construct an office building, only to sell the property again the following month to a group of businessmen who had formed the Hamilton Hotel Corporation. They demolished the original hotel and constructed a modern replacement, designed by local architect Jules Henri de Sibour in the Beaux-Arts style.

The new Hotel Hamilton opened on November 29, 1922. A 1924 senate investigation revealed that Felix Lake had acted as part of a criminal enterprise, along with the F.H. Smith Company and the Hamilton Hotel Company, to inflate the property's value. The scandal widened in the early 1930s, and numerous politicians and businessmen were implicated, with multiple officers of the F.H. Smith Company sentenced to prison.

The scandal forced the Hamilton Hotel Corporation to sell the property soon after it opened to the Chesapeake Hotel Corporation. They, in turn, sold the hotel to Maddux, Marshall, Moss & Mallory in May 1927, for $3 million. The new owners placed the hotel in their 4-M Hotels chain, but then sold the hotel again in December 1927 to a group of New York and Chicago businessmen.

The hotel was sold by Tishman Realty & Construction Company to Manger Hotels in March 1950 and became the Manger Hamilton Hotel. With demand for hotel rooms in downtown Washington enormously decreased after the 1968 Washington, D.C. riots, Manger Hotels sold the hotel to the Hamilton Leasing Corporation in 1969, for $1,072,906. They operated it as the Hamilton Hotel until October 1972, when they closed the hotel and sold it for $1.2 million to the Salvation Army, which reopened it in 1974 as a women's hotel, the Evangeline Hotel for Women. The hotel closed again on May 29, 1977.

The property was sold to Hamilton Associates, Ltd in 1978 and converted at a cost of $5 million to an office building. The office building was a financial failure. It was sold to Mohamed Hadid in the 1980s, but in the aftermath of the Savings and loan crisis, the $22 million mortgage ended up in the hands of the federal government's Resolution Trust Corporation, which sold the loan to Bernstein Companies in 1993 for $3.4 million.

In June 1994, French hotel developer Albert Cohen's Home Plaza bought the vacant Hamilton and an adjacent office building. He restored them at a cost of $20 million. The hotel building was rebuilt with an additional two stories on top. The office building was converted into additional rooms and meeting space for the hotel. The Hamilton Crowne Plaza opened in June 1996. Cohen sold the hotel to the Massachusetts Mutual Life Insurance Company in 1997 for $45 million.

The hotel was listed on the National Register of Historic Places on April 17, 2013. In September 2017, Massachusetts Mutual Life sold the hotel to EOS DCH Owner LLC, for $106.5 million. The hotel left the Crowne Plaza brand and became the Hamilton Hotel, an independent property. In June 2019, the Hamilton Hotel completed a mult-million dollar renovation project with a new lobby design, a new restaurant, Via Sophia, and a new cocktail bar, Society.

== Location ==
The 320-room Hamilton Hotel is located in downtown Washington, D.C., and features a 1920s art deco look. It is an AAA 4-diamond luxury hotel. The hotel is located five blocks away from the White House and one block from the McPherson Square WMATA metro station. It is within walking distance of the Smithsonian Institution museum, the National Mall and the Corcoran Gallery of Art.

== Features ==
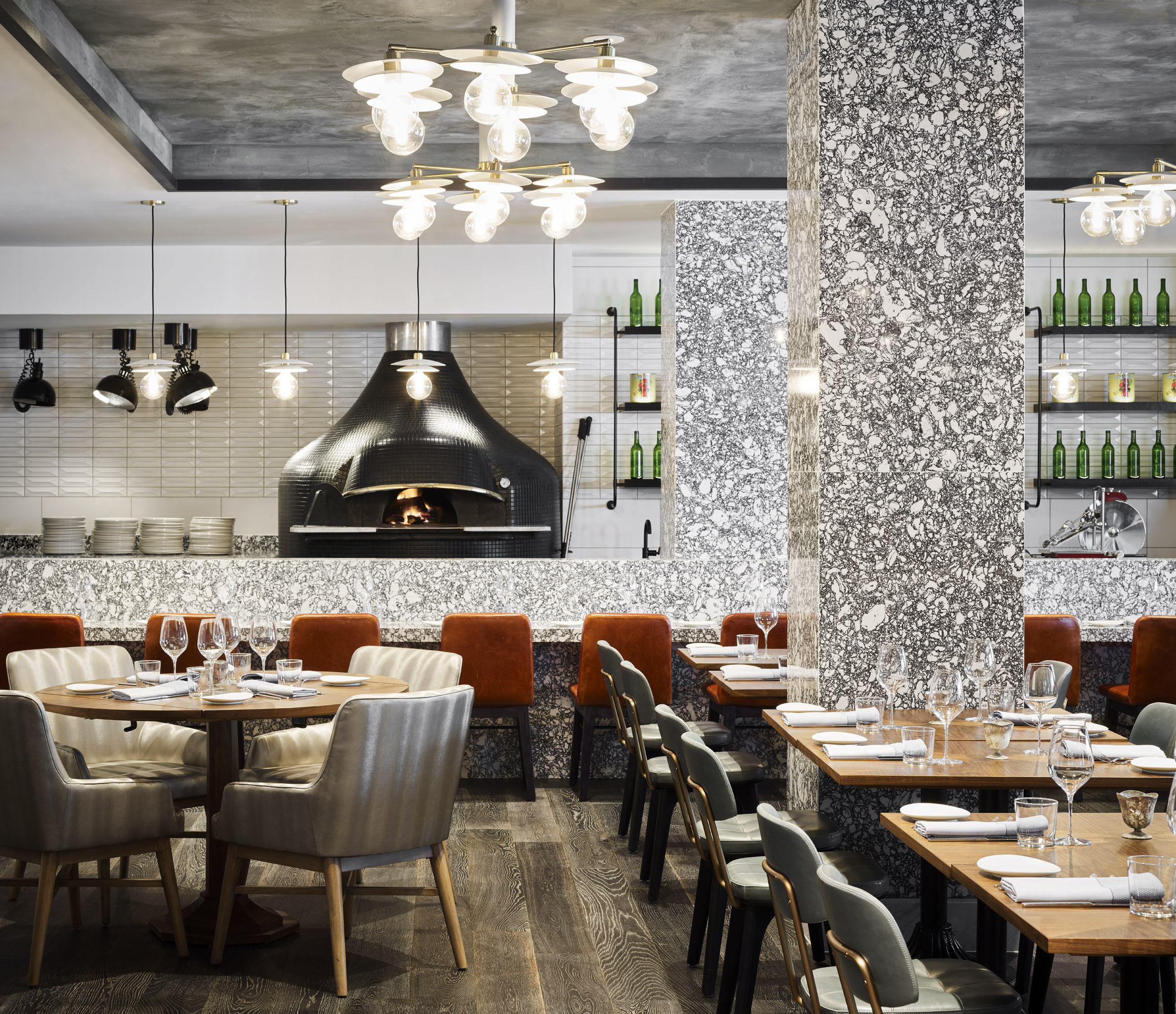
Via Sophia, located in the lobby of Hamilton Hotel.

In June, 2019 Hamilton Hotel opened Via Sophia, an Italian restaurant in the lobby, and Society, a new speakeasy-style cocktail bar.

The Hamilton Hotel provides 17,500 square feet (1,630 m^{2}) to 18,000 square feet (1,700 m^{2}) of space for events and meetings. In the hotel there are 17 suites, 207 single rooms, 111 double rooms, 318 non-smoking rooms and 17 accessible rooms. There also are executive floors and rooms. In total there are 14 floors.

== See also ==
- National Register of Historic Places listings in central Washington, D.C.
- Architecture of Washington, D.C.
