= Buchsbaum =

Buchsbaum is a German surname meaning box tree. Notable people with the surname include:

- David Buchsbaum (1929–2021), American mathematician
- Jason Buchsbaum, American politician
- Otto Buchsbaum (1920–2000), Austrian-born Brazilian writer and ecological activist
- Ralph Buchsbaum (1907–2002), American biologist and author
- Monte Buchsbaum (born 1940), American neuroscientist and pioneer of functional neuroimaging
- Solomon J. Buchsbaum (1930–1993), American physicist and Presidential adviser

== See also ==
- Buxbaum
- Bucksbaum
