= John Bucksbaum =

American business executive

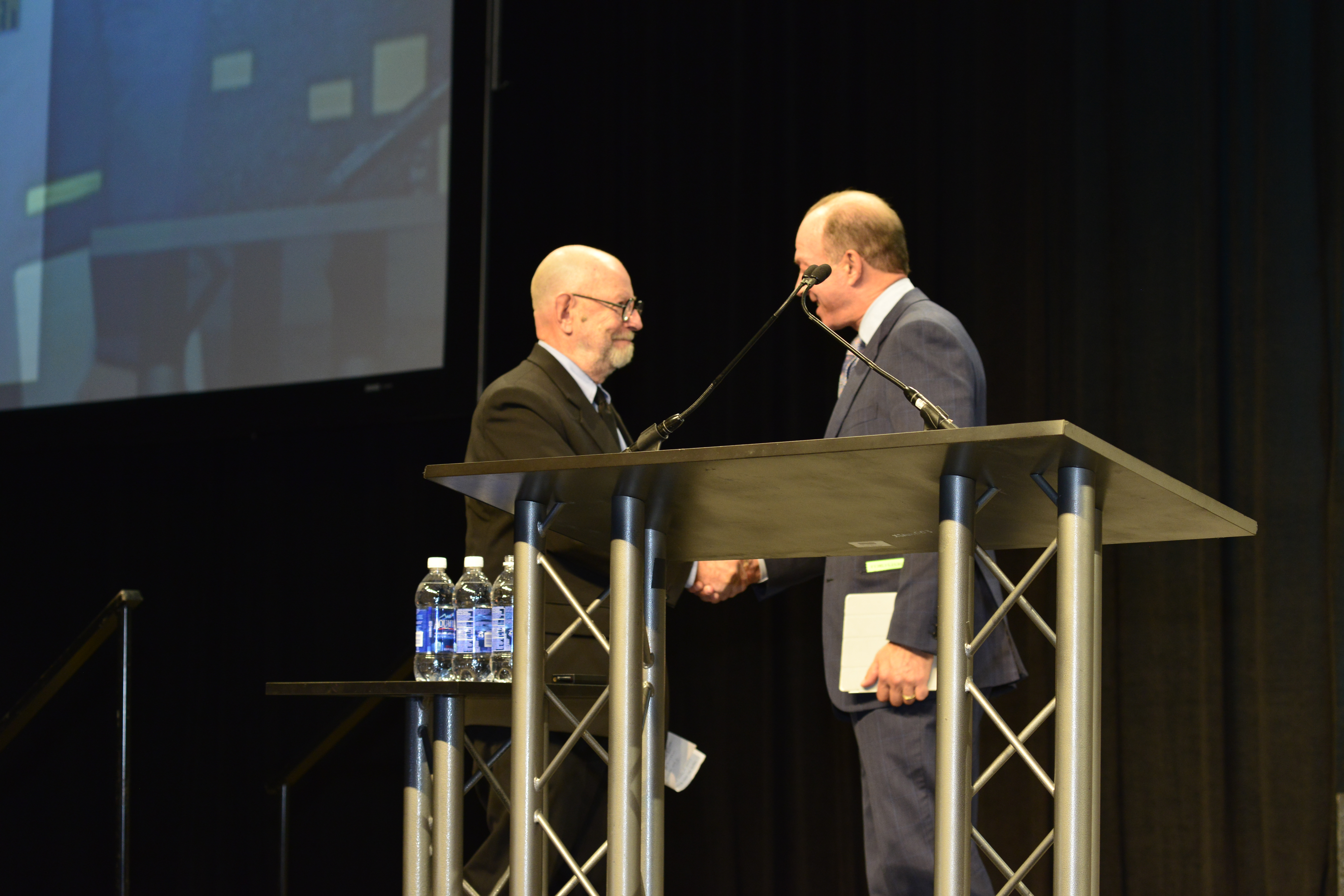
- John Bucksbaum, Jury Chair and Founder – Bucksbaum Retail Properties Chicago, IL introduces Peter Walker 2012 Laureate of the ULI J.C. Nichols Prize for Visionaries in Urban Development at the ULI 2012 Fall Meeting in Denver, CO.
- Born: 1957 (age 68–69)
- Education: University of Denver
- Occupation: Businessman
- Known for: Former CEO of GGP
- Spouse: Jackie Bucksbaum
- Parent(s): Matthew Bucksbaum; Carolyn Swartz
- Relatives: Martin Bucksbaum (uncle); Ann B. Friedman (sister)

John Bucksbaum (born 1957) is the founder and chairman of Bucksbaum Retail Properties, LLC. He was formerly chairman and chief executive officer of GGP Inc., which was a publicly traded real estate investment trust that invested in shopping centers.

== Early life and education ==
Bucksbaum was born circa 1957. His father, Matthew Bucksbaum, and two uncles, Martin Bucksbaum and Maurice Bucksbaum, co-founded General Growth Properties, later known as GGP Inc.

Bucksbaum graduated from the University of Denver.

== Career ==
Bucksbaum worked only for his father's company and started out sweeping the mall floors and cutting the grass as a kid.

In 1999, Bucksbaum succeeded his father as the chairman and chief executive officer of GGP. He served as CEO until 2008, when he was asked to resign as the company was facing bankruptcy. At that time, GGP owned 200 malls in 44 states. Bucksbaum remained chairman until 2010.

In April 2012, Bucksbaum founded Bucksbaum Retail Properties, a real estate development company. By 2014, the company was developing 4 properties in Chicago, including New City. With Steiner + Associates, he developed Liberty Center, a mall in Cincinnati, Ohio.

== Personal life ==
Bucksbaum is married to Jacolyn (Jackie) Bucksbaum. They reside in Lincoln Park, Chicago and have 2 sons. They founded the Jacolyn and John Bucksbaum Foundation, which focuses on early childhood development, Jewish education, sports, and arts and civic organizations in Aspen and Chicago.

Bucksbaum is on the board of the Field Museum and the Chicago International Film Festival.
