= Franklin Square (Washington, D.C.) =

Square in Washington, D.C.

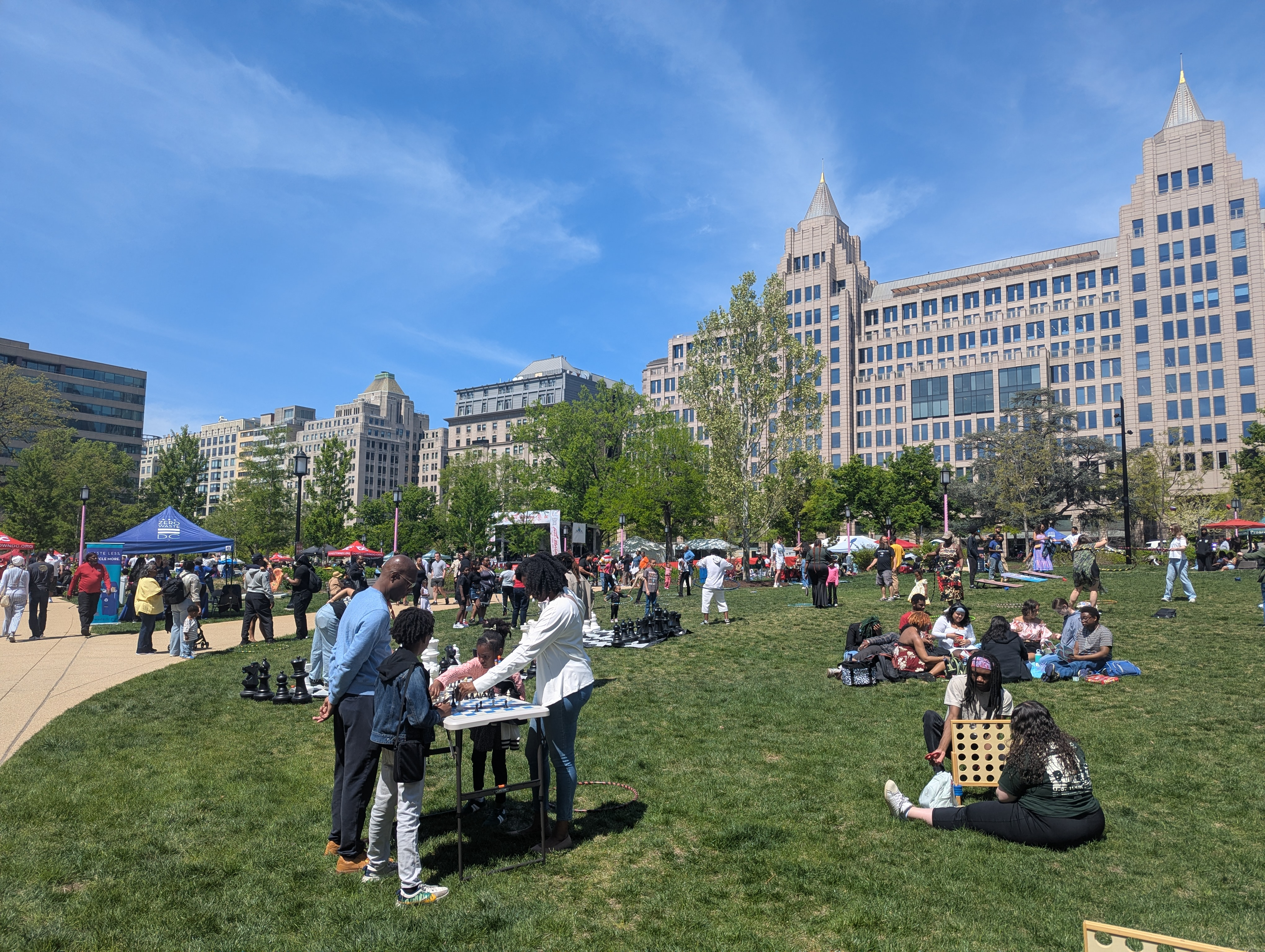
- Franklin Square in 2026
- Interactive map of Franklin Square
- Coordinates: 38°54′07″N 77°01′51″W
- Created: 1832
- Public transit: McPherson Square
- Website: downtowndc.org/franklinpark/

Franklin Square, or Franklin Park, is a square in downtown Washington, D.C. Purportedly named after Benjamin Franklin, it is bounded by K Street NW to the north, 13th Street NW on the east, I Street NW on the south, and 14th Street NW on the west. It is served by the McPherson Square station of the Washington Metro, which is located just southwest of the park.

== Features ==
The park is partially terraced, and slopes uphill from I Street to K Street. There are many large trees, a significant quantity of grass, many benches, and a fountain in the center of the park. Commodore John Barry, a 1914 statue by John Boyle honoring the American Revolutionary War Continental Navy hero John Barry, is on the west side of the park.

== History ==
According to the D.C. Preservation League, Franklin Square was originally the site of several natural springs. The 1791 L'Enfant Plan did not single out the square now occupied by Franklin Park for any special use and it wasn't until 1832 that the government purchased the square and it was turned into a park. There is no definitive proof that the park was named for Benjamin Franklin, as is often assumed.

During the Civil War, the park served as an encampment for soldiers. Men "gathered about the park's famous old springs; here could be heard bugle-calls and sentry orders, and also presently the moans of passing wounded soldiers."

The park remained largely unimproved until the 1870s. Landscaping, benches, and paths were added at that time, and in the 1800s. The park's last major renovation came in 1935, when the Public Works Administration gave the city $75,000 to improve Franklin Square. The fountain, a flagstone plaza, a geometric system of concrete pathways, and new trees were planted. Although a major refurbishment of the paths, fountain, and plaza occurred in 1976 as part of the United States Bicentennial, the park in 2013 looked as it did in 1935.

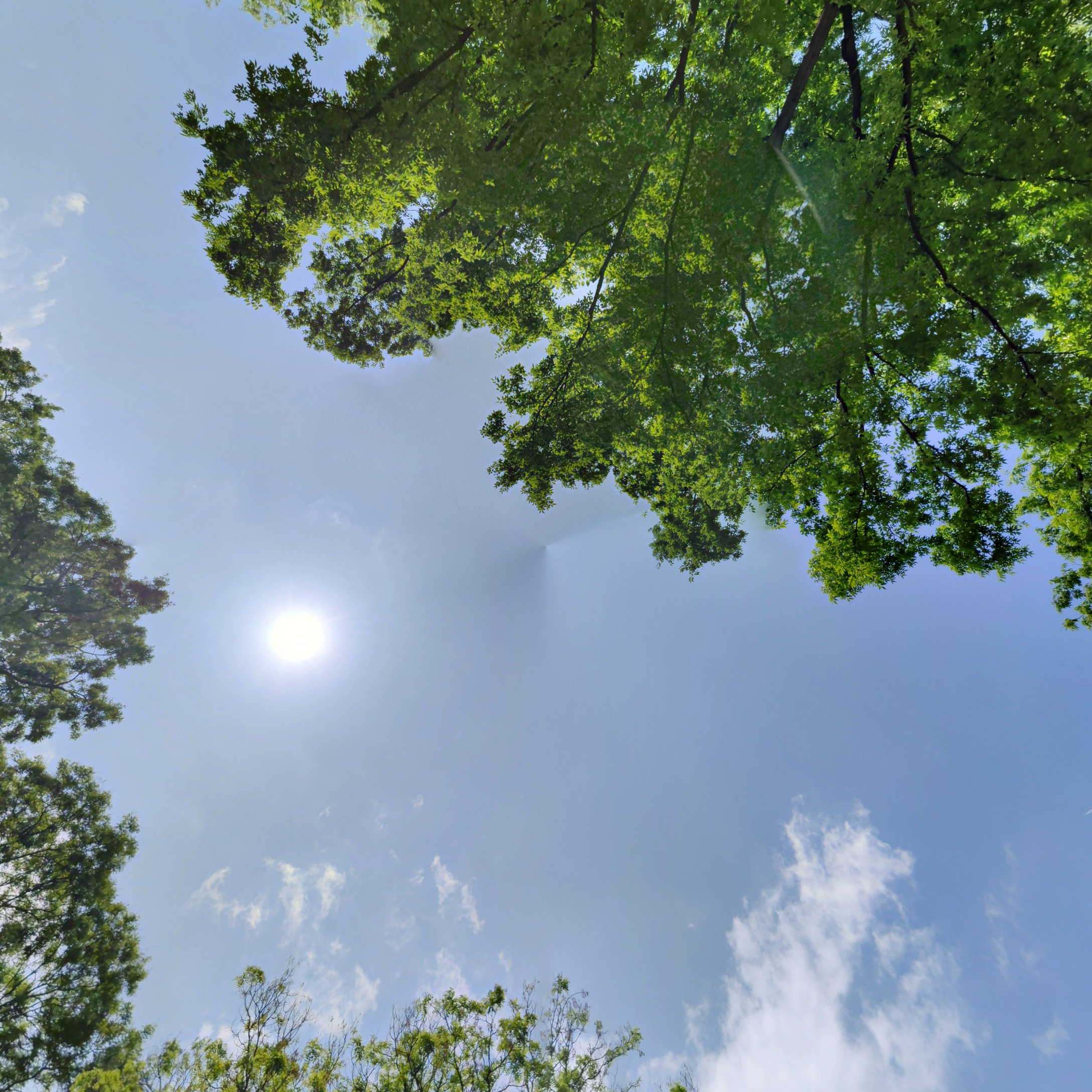
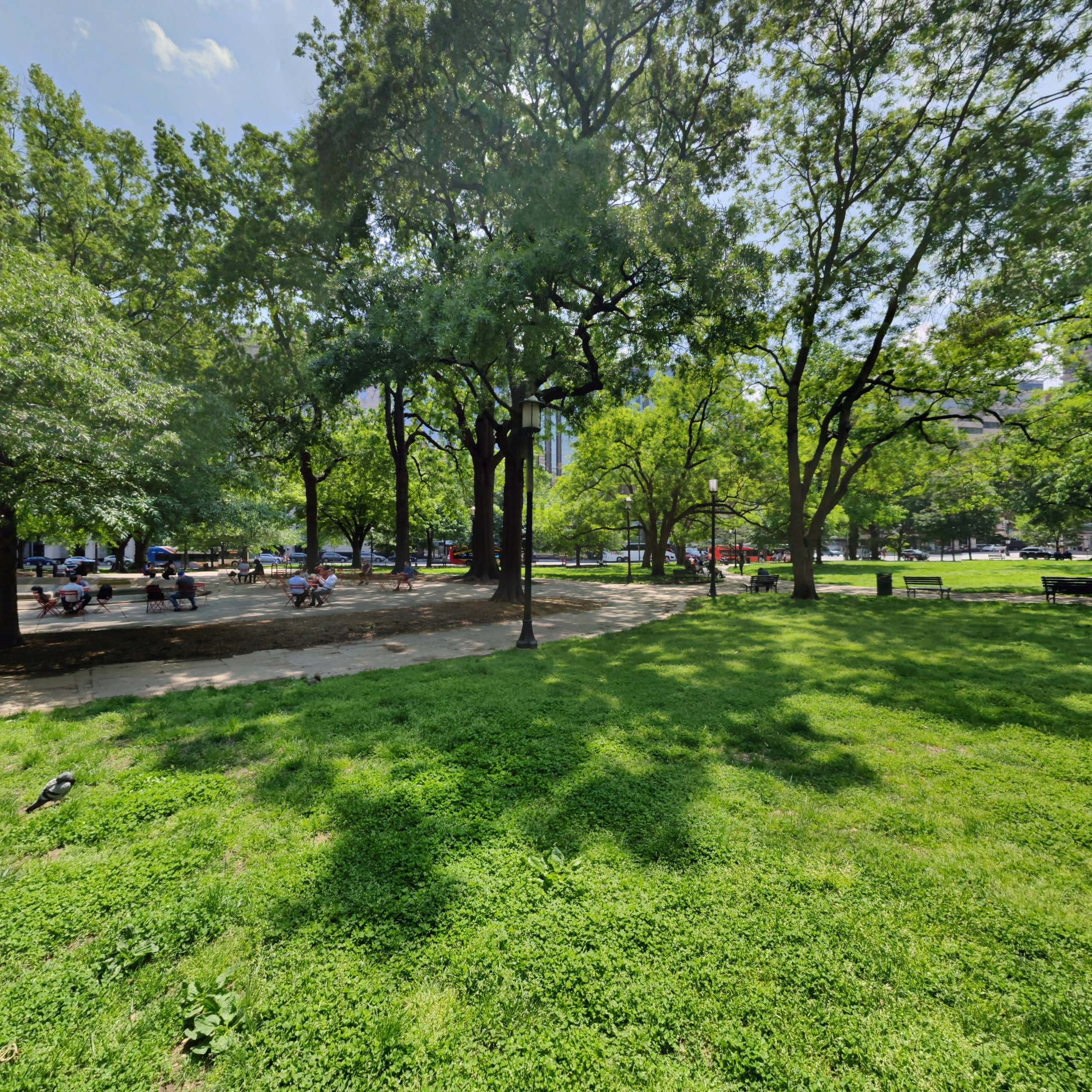
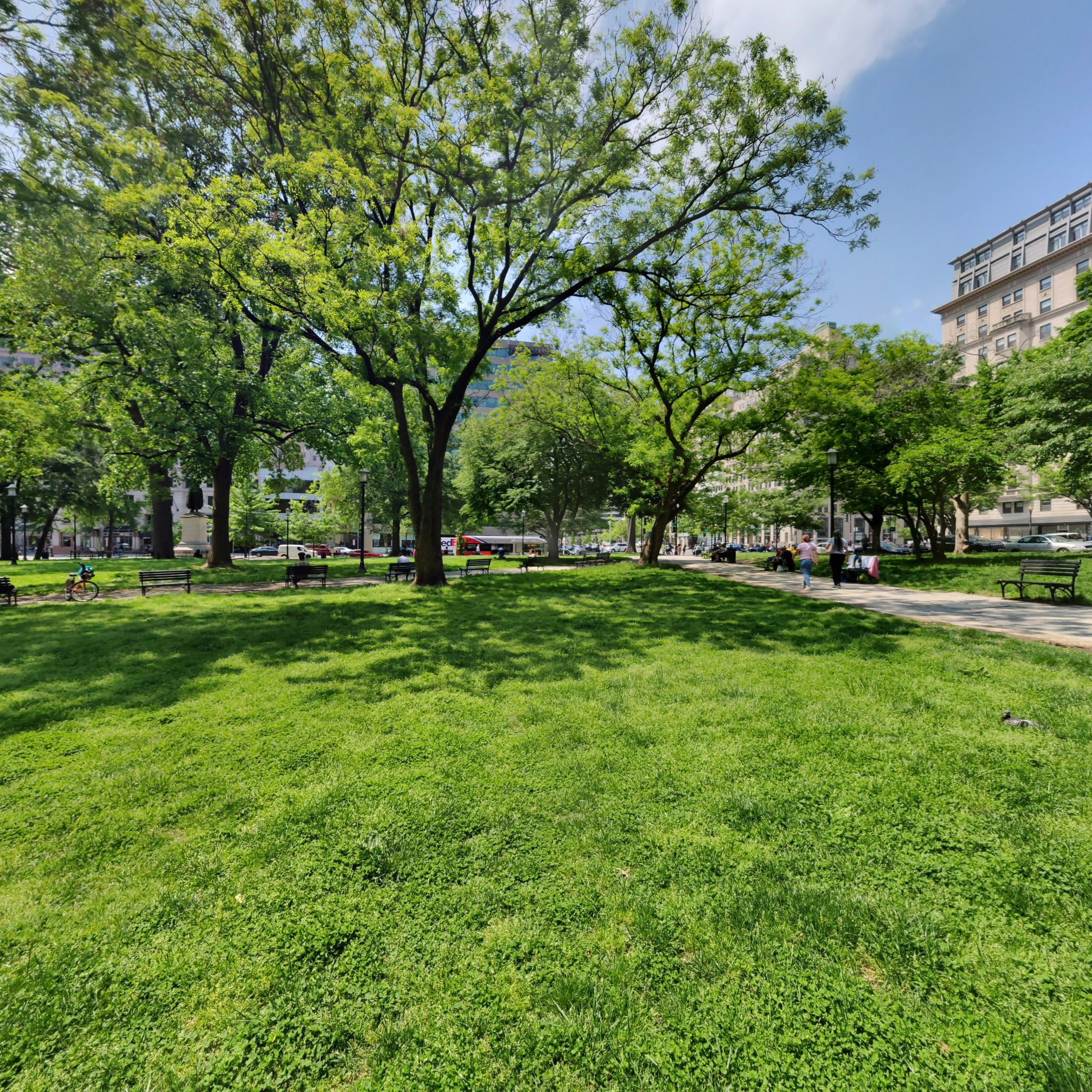
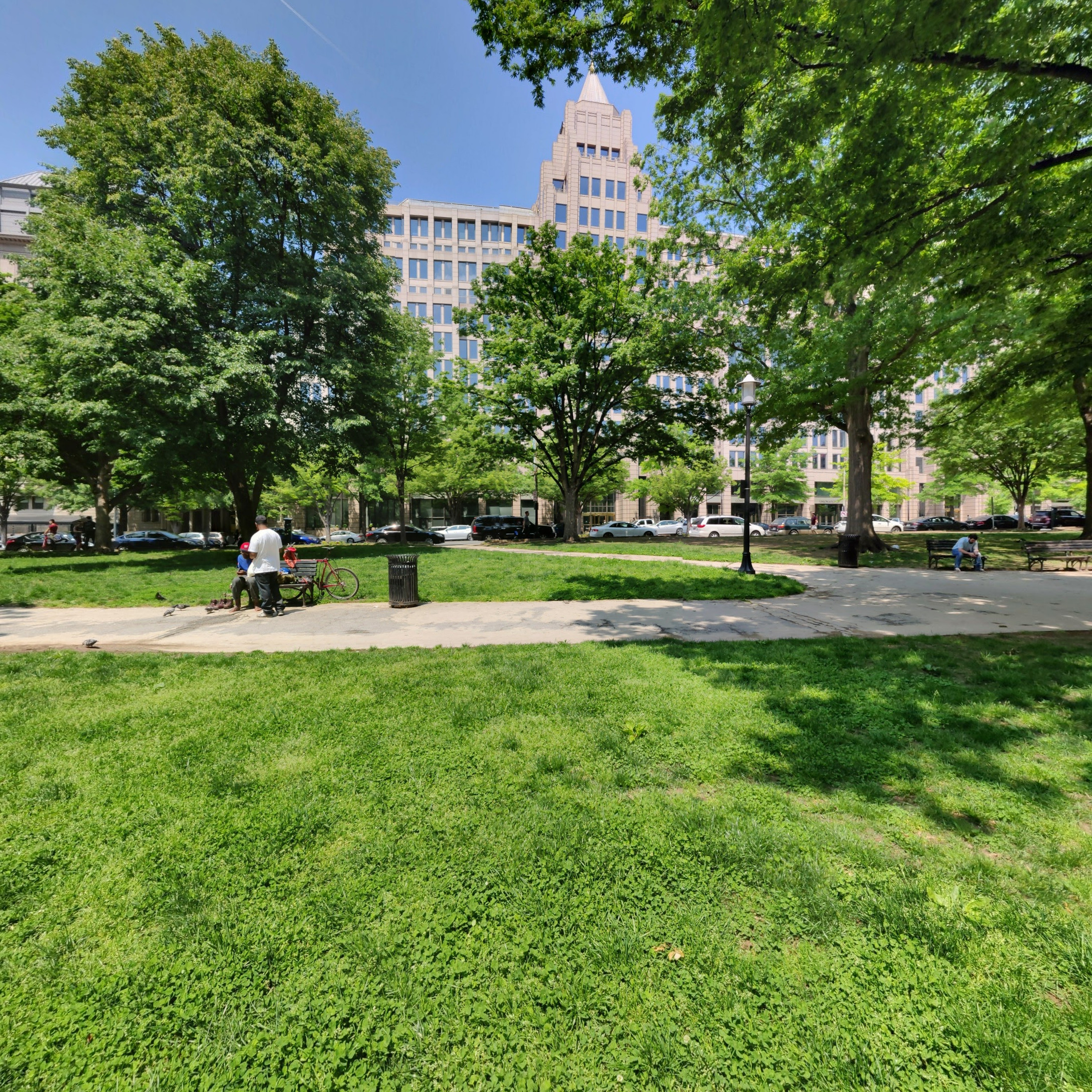
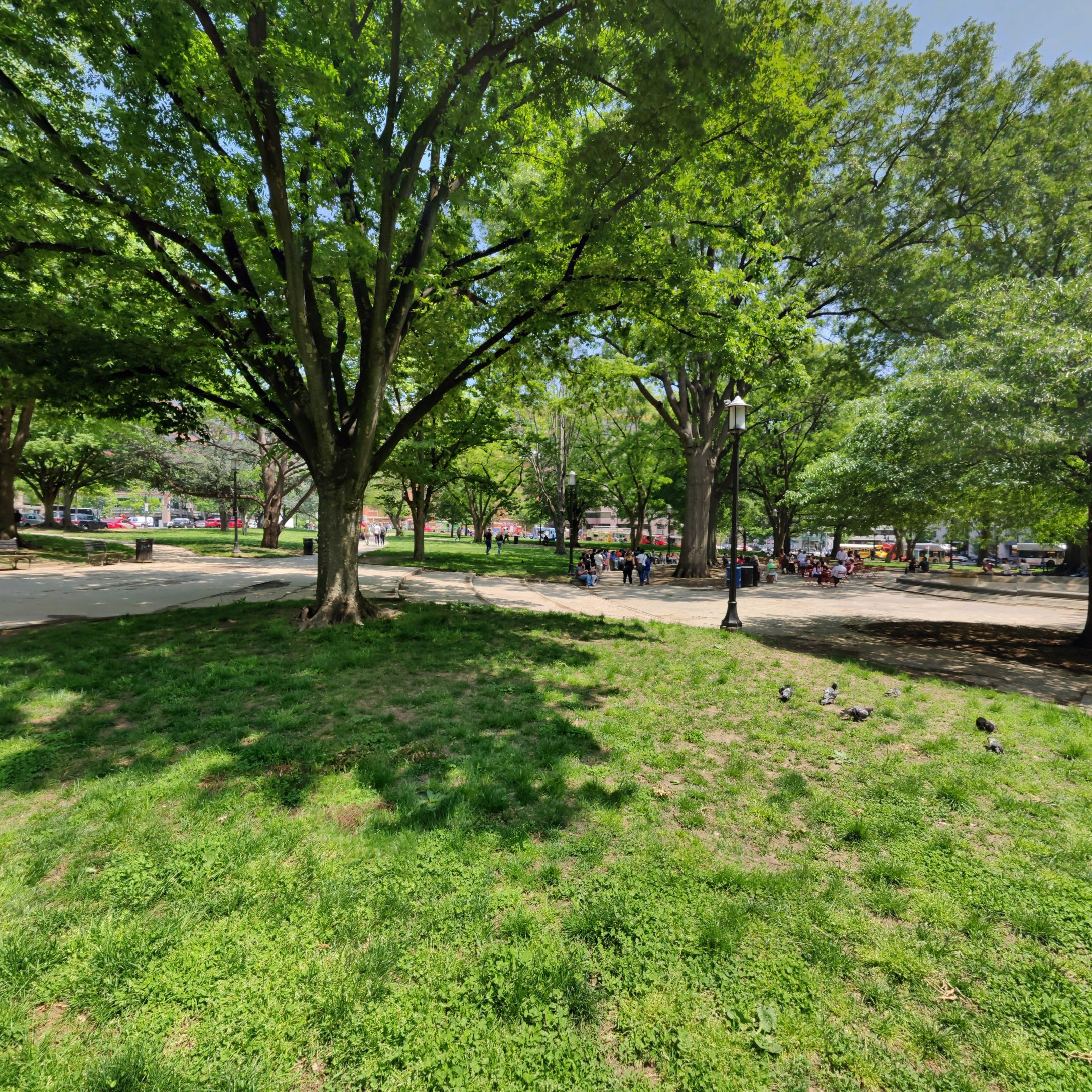
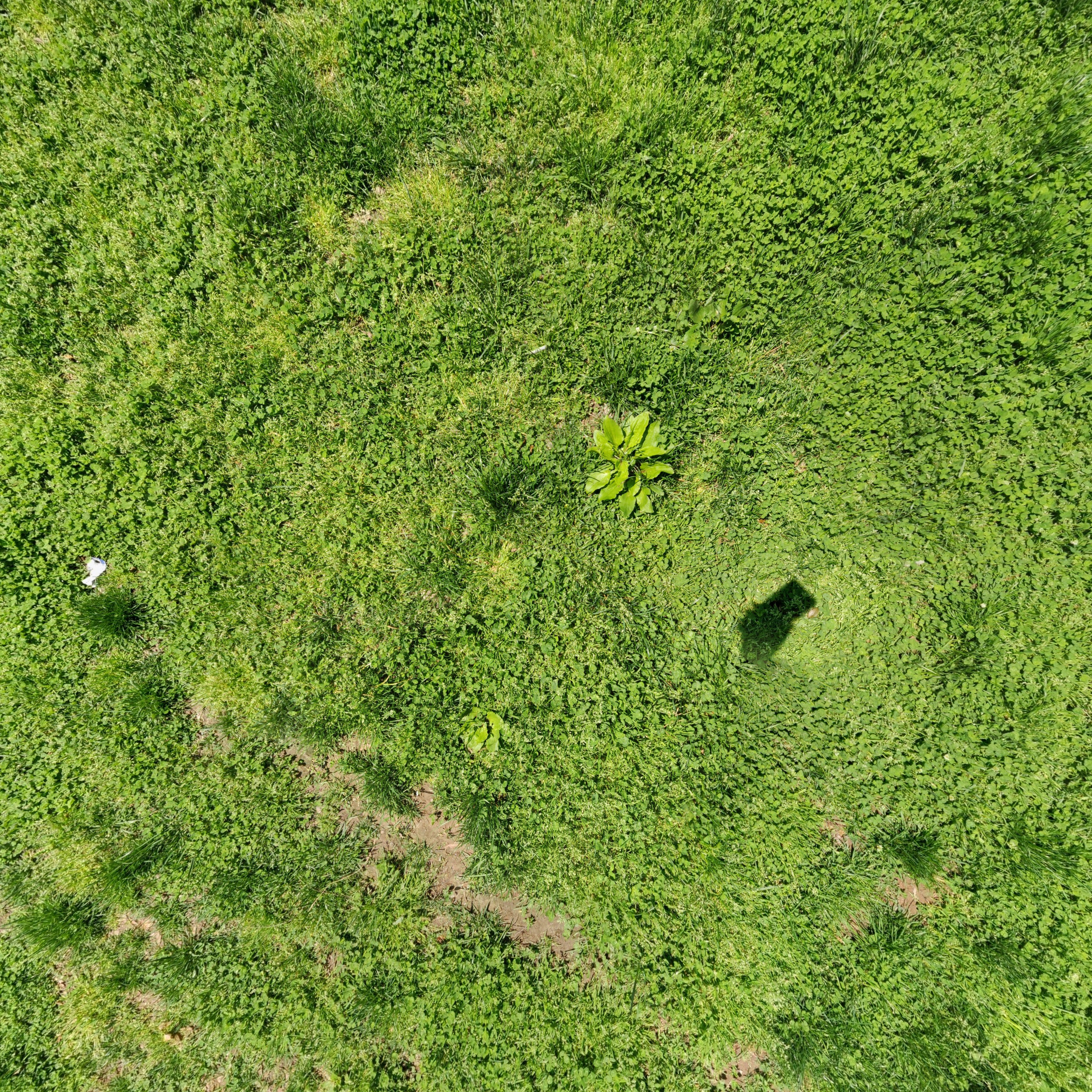
Franklin Square in summer 2019, before the renovation

The 4.79 acres (19,400 m^{2}) that comprise Franklin Square are managed by the National Park Service. By 2012, the square was in significant need of repair. The pathways were broken, workers in nearby buildings had worn paths through the grass to cut across the square more efficiently, and large numbers of homeless individuals camped there. In March 2013, the D.C. government issued a request for proposals (RFP) to redesign Franklin Square so that it could accommodate multiple recreational activities. The RFP requested that any redesign include flexible (rather than fixed) seating, food kiosks, public restrooms, and an enhanced landscape design (especially on the borders of the park). The city set aside $300,000 for the design work.

In September 2021, Franklin Square reopened after a year-long, $21 million renovation. During the renovation, 63 trees were replaced, and new landscaping, a children's play garden, flexible seating, and art exhibit spaces were added. A new cafe building with public restrooms was also added to the southern end of the park.

== Historic buildings bordering Franklin Square ==
Across 13th Street on the east side of the square is the historic Franklin School, which was a model of advanced design in its day and the scene of Alexander Graham Bell's first wireless message. On June 3, 1880, Bell sent a message over a beam of light to a window in a building at 1325 L Street, NW. The building is now home to Planet Word, a language arts museum that opened in October, 2020.

Clara Barton, founder of the American Red Cross, maintained a residence adjacent to the park at 1326 I Street, where she held the first official meeting of the relief organization in May 1881.

One Franklin Square at 1301 K St. NW, directly north of the square, became home to The Washington Post in late 2015. It is the tallest commercial building in Washington, DC.

To the north also stands The Hamilton Hotel at 1001 14th Street, which is a member of the Historic Hotels of America. Built in 1921, it was renovated in 2013.

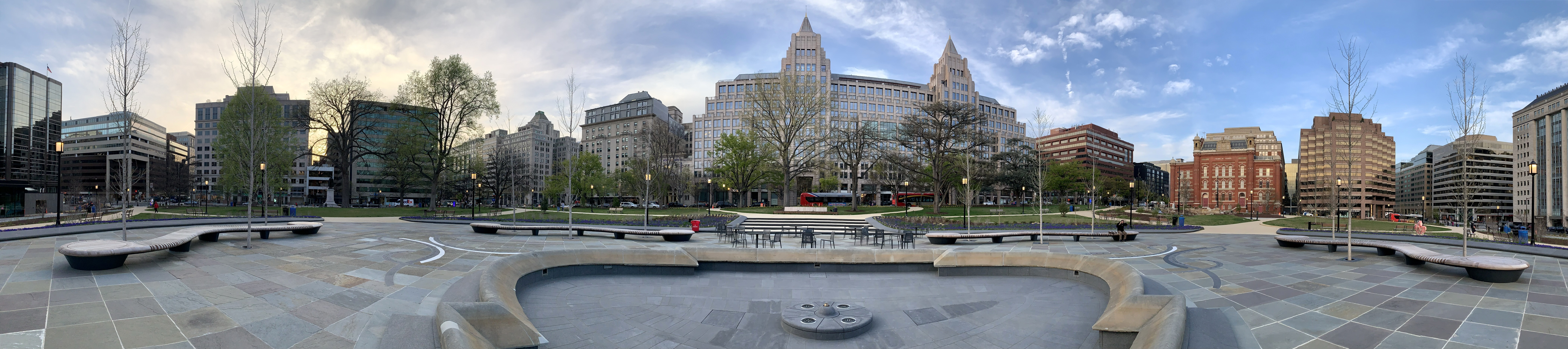
Panoramic of the renovated Franklin Square with views of the Hamilton Hotel, One Franklin Square, and the Franklin School (April 2022)

== In popular culture ==
- Nobel Laureate Charles Townes has said that he conceived the theory behind the laser/maser principle while sitting on a bench in the square.
- The square figures prominently in Dan Brown's 2009 thriller The Lost Symbol.
- In 1993 served as the filming location for several scenes from James Cameron's film True Lies starring Arnold Schwarzenegger.
- The Washington DC Snowball Fight Association organized a snowball fight in the square on January 20, 2024.
