= Yitzhak Buxbaum =

American author and maggid

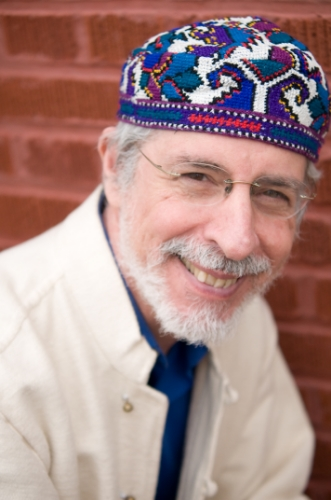
Yitzhak Buxbaum

Yitzhak Buxbaum was an American author and maggid (preacher/storyteller). He died on 23 December 2020.

== Published work ==
Most of Buxbaum's books and articles relate to Hasidism, especially its storytelling tradition, and Neo-Hasidism. He has authored the following books.

- Jewish Spiritual Practices Jason Aronson, 1991 ISBN 978-1-56821-206-7
- Storytelling and Spirituality in Judaism Jason Aronson, 1994 ISBN 978-1-56821-173-2
- Real Davvening: Jewish Prayer as a Spiritual Practice and a Form of Meditation for Beginning and Experienced Davveners |Jewish Spirit Booklet Series, 1996 ISBN 978-1-5114-3313-6
- An Open Heart: The Mystic Path of Loving People. Jewish Spirit Booklet Series, 1997 ISBN 978-0-9657-1122-7
- A Tu BeShvat Seder: The Feast of Fruits from the Tree of Life Jewish Spirit Booklet Series, 1998 ISBN 978-0-9657-1123-4
- The Life and Teachings of Hillel 376 pp. Jason Aronson, 2000 ISBN 978-1-56821-049-0 According to WorldCat, the book is held in 168 libraries
- A Person is Like a Tree: A Sourcebook for Tu BeShvat Jason Aronson, 2000 ISBN 978-0-7657-6128-6
- Storytelling and Spirituality in Judaism Jason Aronson, 2001 ISBN 978-0-7657-6166-8
- Jewish Tales of Mystic Joy Jossey-Bass, 2002 ISBN 978-0-7879-6272-2
- Jewish Tales of Holy Women Jossey-Bass, 2002 ISBN 978-1-118-10443-9
- The Light and Fire of the Baal Shem Tov Continuum, 2005 ISBN 978-0-8264-1772-5
- Serach at the Seder: A Haggadah Supplement, illustrations by Shoshannah Brombacher Jewish Spirit, 2012

Reviews of Buxbaum's work have appeared in Jewish publications with a variety of perspectives, including The Algemeiner Journal, Hadassah Magazine, The Jewish Chronicle, and Tikkun. His books have been reviewed for broader audiences in the journal Parabola and the website Spirituality and Practice.

Manuscripts and drafts of The Light and Fire of the Baal Shem Tov are archived at Cornell University Library.

== Storytelling ==
Buxbaum told stories "in Jewish and non-Jewish settings to Jewish and non-Jewish audiences", with a focus on "the spiritual nature of storytelling." He was grouped among "the most active tellers in the Jewish world."

== Maggid training program ==
Building on his ordination as a maggid by Shlomo Carlebach, Buxbaum established a program to train women and men as maggidim (plural of maggid). Graduates include Shoshana Litman, described as Canada's first ordained female Jewish storyteller, and Tamir Zaltsman, who states that he is the first ordained Russian-speaking maggid. Some graduates are themselves training maggidim.

== Background and personal life ==
Buxbaum graduated from Cornell University (class of 1964).

He told interviewers that as a young man, he identified as an atheist and felt disconnected from his Jewish roots. But a time of intense soul-searching, and encounters with Rabbi Shlomo Carlebach, led him to devote his life to Jewish spirituality.

In 2007, Buxbaum was one of six spiritual leaders from different faiths who opened the memorial celebration for Sri Chinmoy at the United Nations.

Buxbaum lived in Brooklyn. He was married to actor and storyteller Carole Forman.
