= Martin Bucksbaum =

American business executive

- Born: July 31, 1920
- Died: July 7, 1995 (aged 74); Des Moines, Iowa, U.S.
- Occupation: Businessman
- Spouse: Melva Bucksbaum
- Children: 3
- Relatives: Matthew Bucksbaum (brother)

Martin Bucksbaum (July 31, 1920 – July 7, 1995) was an American businessman. He was the chairman and chief executive officer of GGP Inc., a publicly traded real estate investment trust that invests in shopping centers.

== Early life ==
Bucksbaum was born July 31, 1920. His father, Louis Bucksbaum, owned three grocery stores in Marshalltown, Iowa. He had two brothers, Matthew and Maurice. Bucksbaum served in the United States Army during World War II.

== Career ==
With his brothers Matthew and Maurice, Bucksbaum took a $1.2 million loan to develop Town & Country in Cedar Rapids, Iowa in 1953. At the time, it was one of the first malls in the United States. In 1954, the three brothers co-founded General Growth Properties, now known as GGP Inc. Bucksbaum was its chairman and chief executive officer. By 1995, the company owned 21 malls in the US. In Iowa, the malls that Bucksbaum helped develop were located in small towns like Waterloo, Bettendorf, Council Bluffs, Davenport, Sioux City, Cedar Falls, Keokuk, West Burlington, Muscatine as well as cities like Ames and Des Moines.

Bucksbaum wason the board of directors of the Offitbank. He was a member of the International Council of Shopping Centers and a governor of the National Association of Real Estate Investment Trusts.

== Personal life, death and legacy ==
Bucksbaum married Melva Venezky. They had two sons, Gene and Glenn, and a daughter, Mary. They resided in Des Moines, Iowa. Bucksbaum was on the board of governors of Drake University as well as the national committee of the Whitney Museum of American Art. He was a member of the Marshalltown Masonic Lodge.

Bucksbaum died of a heart attack on July 7, 1995, in Des Moines, Iowa, at 74. His funeral was held at Temple B'Nai Jeshurun, and he was buried in the Jewish Glendale Cemetery.

Shortly after his death, Bucksbaum was succeeded as chairman and CEO of GPP by his brother Matthew Bucksbaum.
