= Matthew Bucksbaum =

American businessman and philanthropist

- Born: February 20, 1926; Marshalltown, Iowa, U.S.
- Died: November 24, 2013 (aged 87); Chicago, U.S.
- Education: University of Iowa (BA)
- Occupation: Real estate developer
- Known for: Co-founder of General Growth Properties
- Spouse: Carolyn "Kay" Swartz
- Children: 2
- Military career
- Allegiance: United States
- Branch: United States Army Air Forces
- Service years: World War II
- Units: Fifth Air Forces; Cryptographer
- Conflicts: Southwest Pacific Area; New Guinea campaign

Matthew Bucksbaum (February 20, 1926 – November 24, 2013) was an American businessman and philanthropist. Matthew and his brothers Martin and Maurice co-founded General Growth Properties.

== Early life ==
Bucksbaum was born to a Jewish family in Marshalltown, Iowa, to Ida (Gervich) and Louis Bucksbaum. During World War II, he served in the Army Air Forces in the Southwest Pacific Theatre as a cryptographer based in New Guinea. He graduated from the University of Iowa cum laude with a Bachelor of Arts in Economics in 1949, where he was a member of Phi Beta Kappa society and the Order of Artus. His family owned a chain of three grocery stores.

== Career ==
In 1954, Bucksbaum and his brother Martin borrowed $1.2 million and built the first shopping center in Cedar Rapids, Iowa, anchored by a fourth family grocery store. They expanded into enclosed malls which mirrored the continued movement to the suburbs seen in the 1960s. By 1964, their company - then named General Management - owned five malls anchored by the Younkers department store. In 1972, the company became publicly traded on the New York Stock Exchange under the name General Growth Properties (NYSE: GGP) and became the second-largest owner, developer, and manager of regional shopping malls in the country. Bucksbaum was its chairman and chief executive officer, and under his tenure he formed two real estate investment trusts and expanded the company's portfolio of malls and shopping centers via more than $36 billion in acquisitions. In 1984, General Growth sold 19 malls for $800 million to Equitable Real Estate, which was deemed the "nation's largest single asset real estate transaction" to date. In 1995, his brother Martin died and he re-located the company to Chicago. In 2004, General Growth purchased The Rouse Company for $14.2 billion. By 2007, General Growth was the second-largest REIT owning 194 malls with over 200 million square feet in 44 states. In 2008, General Growth filed for Chapter 11 bankruptcy protection after the collapse of the stock market.

== Philanthropy ==
Bucksbaum sat on the board of trustees of the Aspen Music Festival and School, the Chicago Symphony Orchestra and the Lyric Opera of Chicago. He was a president of the Temple B'nai Jeshurun and the Polk County Mental Health Association, and a director of the Iowa Natural Heritage Foundation, all in Des Moines, Iowa. He donated $42 million to the University of Chicago for the creation of the Bucksbaum Institute for Clinical Excellence.

== Personal life ==
Bucksbaum was married to Carolyn "Kay" (Swartz) Bucksbaum, who was also Jewish. They resided in Chicago, and had two children. Their son, John Bucksbaum, was CEO of General Growth Properties from 1999 to 2008, and chairman from 2007 to 2010. Their daughter Ann Louise Bucksbaum is married to journalist Thomas Friedman. As of March 2011, he was worth an estimated US$1.2 billion.

== Death ==
Bucksbaum died in Chicago of complications from Alzheimer's disease on November 24, 2013.
