= Capitalist peace theory =

International relations theory

The capitalist or commercial peace theory posits that market openness contributes to more peaceful behavior among states, and that developed market-oriented economies are less likely to engage in conflict with one another. Along with the democratic peace theory and institutionalist arguments for peace, the commercial peace forms part of the Kantian tripod for peace. Prominent mechanisms for the commercial peace revolve around how capitalism, trade interdependence, and capital interdependence raise the costs of warfare, incentivize groups to lobby against war, make it harder for leaders to go to war, and reduce the economic benefits of conquest.

Scholars have debated the empirical and theoretical validity of the commercial peace thesis, as well as the mechanisms behind the theory. According to one review of existing research, the evidence on the relationship between economic interdependence and conflict is inconclusive.

== History ==
The philosophical roots of the commercial peace, closely related to the concept of doux commerce, can be traced back to Montesquieu, David Hume, Richard Cobden, Immanuel Kant, Joseph Schumpeter, Norman Angell, and classical economic theory. In the 19th century, many of the proponents of the commercial peace were on the political left, seeing free trade as essential to a peaceful and prosperous world order.

In his 1795 essay Perpetual Peace, Immanuel Kant argued, among other things, that "the spirit of commerce . . . sooner or later takes hold of every nation, and is incompatible with war." In the early twentieth century Norman Angell reasoned that trade interdependence in modern economies makes war unprofitable. Later, Joseph Schumpeter offered the observation that with the advancement of capitalism people form "an unwarlike disposition." Karl Polanyi argues in The Great Transformation that the emergence of international finance was the main contributor to peace in Europe between the end of the Napoleonic Wars and World War I.

== Theory ==
=== Trade interdependence ===
The interdependent trade theory for the capitalist peace is built on the foundations of classical economic theory. This idea, which can be traced back to Kant, became the original theoretical explanation for the capitalist peace. In 1996, Erich Weede tied trade and free markets to development and peace, proposing that trade interdependence caused peace between nations. Weede followed this up with what he called the "capitalist peace". However, the empirical findings of the link between trade and development have been drawn into question, as one study found that the proportion of GDP to foreign trade is only 0.08, measured by logged GDP per capita. Stephen Gent and Mark Crescenzi have argued that economic interdependence has reduced interstate conflict over market power.

Katherine Barbieri has pushed back on the commercial peace thesis, finding only limited empirical support for the thesis. A 2021 study in International Security by Mariya Grinberg found that states frequently engage in trade even while they are conducting war against each other, which raises questions about the preventive power of trade interdependence. Some scholars argue that asymmetric dependence and relative gains may spur conflict. Henry Farrell and Abraham Newman argue that interdependence may spur conflict by provoking competition for important nodes in global economic networks.

According to Dale Copeland, trade can have a pacifying effect on interstate relations, but only if states believe that they will reap the rewards of trade into the future. Barry Buzan has argued, "Liberal and mercantilist structures each have both positive and negative impacts on the use of force, but these impacts become important only when they are complemented by noneconomic factors governing the use of force."

The outbreak of World War I during a period of unprecedented globalization and economic interdependence has often been cited as an example of how economic interdependence fails to prevent war or even contributes to it. Other scholars dispute that World War I was a failure for liberal theory. Eric Gartzke and Yonatan Lupu argue that there was a lack of trade interdependence between the states that ignited WWI. Patrick McDonald and Kevin McSweeney argue that globalization in the period prior to WWI revolved around reductions in transportation costs, not due to trade liberalization, which means that the pre-WWI period is not a great case for testing the capitalist peace thesis.

A 2021 PNAS study found that trade openness considerably reduces the risks of conflict over strategic locations close to maritime choke points.

=== Economic norms theory ===
Michael Mousseau has advocated for what he calls "economic norms theory", which entails that leaders of states with advanced market-oriented economies have a strong interest in guarding the principle of self-determination for all states in order to safeguard a robust global marketplace. Leaders of states with weak internal markets have little regard for protecting the global marketplace.

Economic norms theory links the economic conditions of clientelism, which prevail in many lower income societies, and a contract-intensive economy, which prevails in many higher income societies, with divergent political interests and habits.

Economic norms theory arose as an alternative explanation to the democratic peace, because it identified the causal relationship between democracy and peace as spurious. Michael Mousseau identified contract-intensive economies as a possible cause of both democracy and peace. He defines contract-intensive economies as those that have high life insurance contracting rates. The explanation is based on two aspects widely accepted in social science: (1) bounded rationality; and (2) divergent hierarchies between clientelism and contract-intensive economies. In contract-intensive societies, individuals have a loyalty towards the state that enforces the contracts between strangers. As a consequence, individuals in these societies expect that their states enforce contracts reliably and impartially, protect individual rights, and make efforts to enhance the general welfare. Moreover, with the assumption of bounded rationality, individuals routinely dependent on trusting strangers in contracts will develop the habits of trusting strangers and preferring universal rights, impartial law, and liberal democratic government. In contrast, individuals in contract-poor societies will develop the habits of abiding by the commands of group leaders, and distrusting those from out-groups.

According to economic norms theory, the people in contract-rich nations enjoy a permanent and positive peace. As long as their states accede to popular demands and remain reliably impartial, individuals in nations with contract intensive economies have an interest in everyone's rights and material welfare, within and outside the nation. Consequently, contract-intensive nations not only avoid war with each other but engage in intense levels of mutual cooperation specifically aimed at promoting each other's material welfare. Leaders of nations with contract-poor economies, in contrast, pursue the interests of their dominant groups and have no interest in the security or welfare of members of out-groups, whether they are internal or external to the nation. In a 2019 analysis, Mosseau argued that voting patterns at the United Nations General Assembly support economic norms theory.

One concern with Mousseau's theoretical explanation is that he suggests that contracting in life insurance "indicates a highly institutionalized norm of contracting in a society because… to contract in life insurance requires a great deal of trust…"; "In contract-intensive societies ... making contracts with strangers promotes loyalty ... to a state that enforces these contracts with... equal application of the rule of law,"; And "What distinguishes marketplace societies from others is that property confiscations are carried out with impartiality and in accordance with the rule of law." However, the source that Mousseau references for the life insurance data (Beck and Webb) report that "... the rule of law or corruption cannot explain variation of Life Insurance Density across countries." In contrast, they report that "income per capita, inflation, and banking sector development are the most robust predictors of life insurance consumption across countries and over time." Thus, it is questionable as to whether life insurance truly "indicates a highly institutionalized norm of contracting in a society..."

Another concern with Mousseau's explanation of capitalist peace theory is his omission of almost every Latin American intervention between 1816 and 1992, a fact that allows the author to conclude that "joint highly democratic dyads are about 3 times more likely … to resolve their militarized conflicts with mutual concessions’ (Mousseau, 1998, p. 210; see also Bremer, 1993)."

=== Costly signaling ===
Some scholars argue that nations that have greater trade flows and capital flows are less likely to end up in conflict because they are able to engage in costly signaling. When those countries issue explicit threats, their threats are taken seriously because the issuing of the threat leads investors and traders to pull investments and trade from the country. This reduces the likelihood that crises inadvertently escalate into war.

=== Capital and finance ===
Stephen G. Brooks has argued in a number of studies that the globalization of finance and the rise of multinational companies have contributed to a more peaceful international system. In a 2005 study, he argues that conquest for economic purposes is pointless and counterproductive in an international system with extensive mobility of capital and elaborate global supply chains. In a 2013 study, he argued, "there are no longer any economic actors who will be favorable toward war and who will lobby the government with this preference... the current structure of the global economy now makes it feasible for foreign direct investment to serve as an effective substitute for conquest in a way that was not possible in previous eras."

=== Size of government ===
Patrick J. McDonald has argued that smaller governments are more dependent than larger or socialist governments on raising taxes for fighting wars. This makes the commitments of nations with smaller governments more credible than those with larger ones, allowing for nations with smaller governments, and thus "capitalist" economies, to be better positioned for avoiding conflicts.

=== Ruling others by force ===
This theory adduces that if men want to oppose war, it is statism that they must oppose. So long as they hold the tribal notion that the individual is sacrificial fodder for the collective, that some men have the right to rule others by force, and that some (any) alleged "good" can justify it—there can be no peace within a nation and no peace among nations.

=== Lower economic benefits from conquest ===
According to Richard Rosecrance, states can accumulate power and enhance their security through trade and foreign direct investment in an economically open international system, whereas in previous era, states accumulated power through conquest of land. Peter Lieberman has rebutted Rosecrance, arguing that states have reaped benefits from conquest in the 20th century.

== Golden arches theory ==
In Thomas L. Friedman's 1999 book The Lexus and the Olive Tree, the following statement was presented: "No two countries that both had McDonald's had fought a war against each other since each got its McDonald's". He supported his belief, as a theory, by stating that when a country has reached an economic development where it has a middle class strong enough to support a McDonald's network, it would become a "McDonald's country", and will not be interested in fighting wars anymore.

=== Criticism ===
Shortly after the book was published, NATO bombed Yugoslavia. On the first day of the bombing, McDonald's restaurants in Belgrade were demolished by angry protesters and were rebuilt only after the bombing ended. In the 2000 edition of the book, Friedman argued that this exception proved the rule: the war ended quickly, he argued, partly because the Serbian population did not want to lose their place in a global system "symbolised by McDonald's" (Friedman 2000: 252–253).

In 2022, the rule was violated again with the 2022 Russian invasion of Ukraine. Both Ukraine and Russia had a substantial amount of McDonald's locations in both countries before the invasion. McDonald's later sold all the locations in Russia to a Siberian licensee.

In 2023, in response to Israel attacking Lebanon (Note: Both Israel and Lebanon have McDonald's restaurants.) as a part of the Israel–Hezbollah conflict (2023–present), Professor Paul Musgrave of University of Massachusetts Amherst stated that “We’re in a post-‘Golden Arches Theory of Conflict Prevention’ world now for sure.”

== Dell theory ==
The Dell Theory of Conflict Prevention, or Dell theory, was presented by Thomas Friedman in his book, The World Is Flat. It is an updated version of his previous golden arches theory.

"The Dell Theory stipulates: No two countries that are both part of a major global supply chain, like Dell’s, will ever fight a war against each other as long as they are both part of the same global supply chain."

=== Criticism ===
The Dell theory failed when Russia invaded Ukraine in February 2014, seizing Crimea and cutting off Russia from essential military and civil components, including jet turbines for helicopters and aircraft, which were manufactured in Ukraine. The restricted supply of these items has negatively impacted Russia's later continuation of its war against Ukraine.

== See also ==
- American Peace Award, 1924 contest
- Big Mac Index
- Doux commerce
- The World Is Flat
- Democratic peace
- Economic liberalization
- Immanuel Kant
- Merchants of death, idea that financiers & munitions industry started World War I
- Liberal International relations theory
- Ultra-imperialism
- Wandel durch Handel
