= Thank You for Being Late =

2016 nonfiction book by Thomas Friedman

Thank you for Being Late: an Optimist's Guide to Thriving in the Age of Accelerations
- First edition
- Author: Thomas Friedman
- Cover artist: Rodrigo Corral
- Publisher: Farrar, Straus and Giroux
- Publication date: 2016
- Publication place: New York
- Pages: 486
- ISBN: 978-0241301449

Thank you for Being Late: an Optimist's Guide to Thriving in the Age of Accelerations is a non-fiction book written by New York Times columnist Thomas Friedman.

== Contents ==
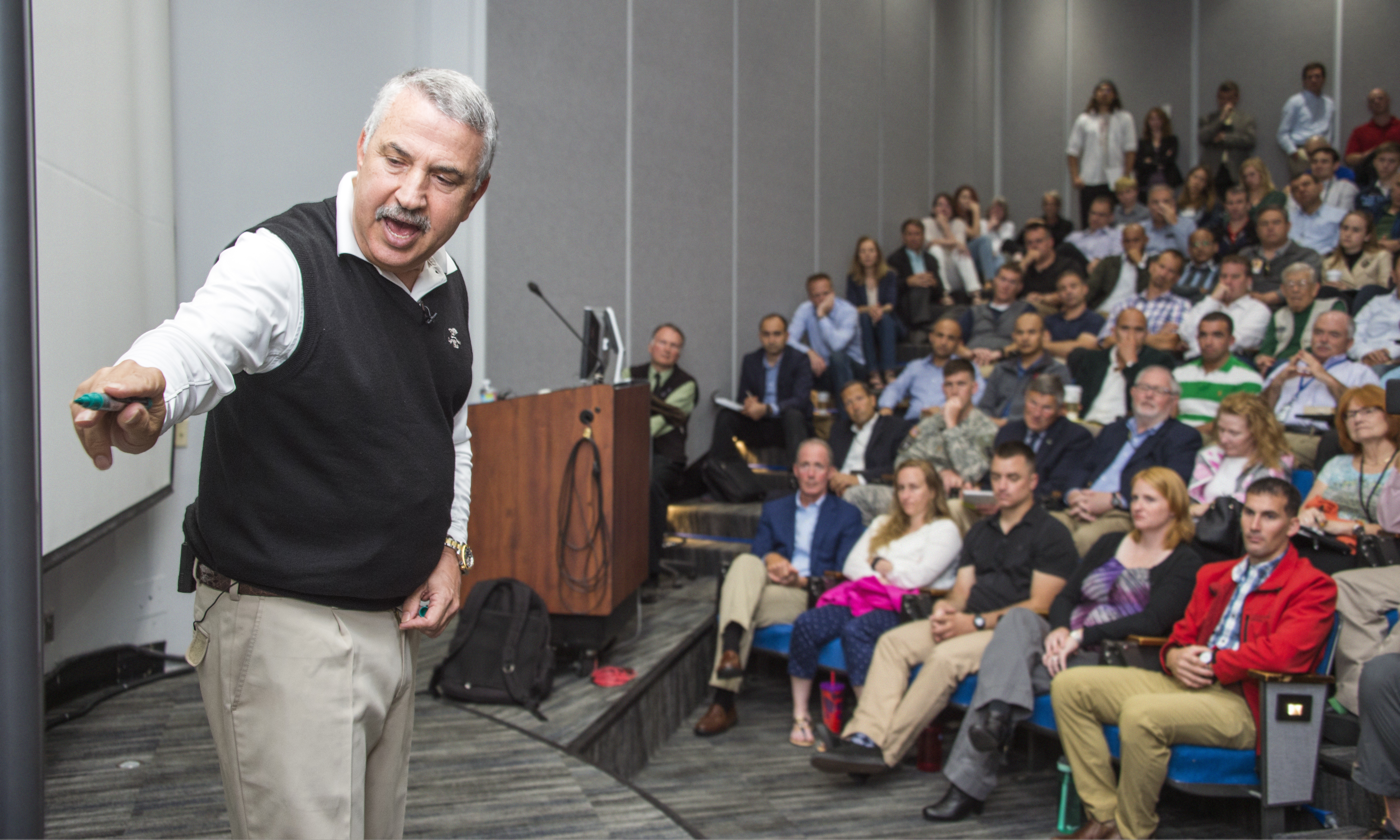
Author Thomas Friedman speaking on the book at the Naval Postgraduate School in 2016

The book is divided into four parts - Reflecting, Accelerating, Innovating and Anchoring. When a friend arrived late for lunch, Friedman said, "Thank You for Being Late", as it gave him time to reflect, to listen to what was taking place around him and to slow down the pace. He begins by sharing a conversation with a fellow blogger, who also happened to be working as a parking attendant. The unlikely pair ended up spending time together as Friedman helped the blogger refine his process. This led to his own deeper reflection on defining his conceptual framework that underpinned his writing. He took a year's sabbatical to research and produce this book encapsulating what he discovered.

== Reviews ==
John Micklethwait, editor-in-chief of Bloomberg News, who reviewed Thank you for Being Late for The New York Times, wrote that this is Friedman's "most ambitious book — part personal odyssey, part common-sense manifesto". Friedman is a "self-confessed 'explanatory journalist' — whose goal is to be a 'translator from English to English' and this book is "a master class in explaining."

== See also ==
- That Used to Be Us
- The World Is Flat
- Hot, Flat, and Crowded
- Radical center politics
