= The World Is Curved =

2009 book by David M. Smick

The World Is Curved: Hidden Dangers to the Global Economy
- First edition cover
- Author: David M. Smick
- Language: English
- Subject: Globalization
- Publisher: Portfolio
- Publication date: 2009-08-31
- Publication place: United States
- Media type: Print (Hardcover and Paperback)
- ISBN: 978-1591842187

The World Is Curved: Hidden Dangers to the Global Economy is a book written by David M. Smick, a financial market consultant, non-fiction author, and Chairman and CEO in the consultancy company of Johnson Smick International (JSI). This book opposes the views of Thomas Friedman's The World Is Flat: A Brief History of the Twenty-First Century. Smick considers the potential negative ramifications of a constantly fluctuating global economy and analyzes possible solutions to these challenges.

== Reviews ==
Publishers Weekly reviewer Greg Alexander wrote: "Smick brings expertise and lucidity to many difficult subjects, and while his book's appeal will likely be limited to those with some background in the field, it will undoubtedly stir interest and debate amongst investors, policymakers and strategists alike."

In Foreign Affairs, Richard N. Cooper said that "This book is a rambling and anecdotal but enjoyable account by a participant-observer of the vital role the financial system has played in the huge growth in global prosperity over the past 25 years. Smick is unambiguous in holding private-sector players responsible for the emerging debacle."

Book review website Kirkus Reviews opined: "A supremely useful book for portfolio planning, though not the thing to give someone who's inclined to worry about the state of the world."

Forbes contributor Bret Swanson expressed disappointment that Smick lays little responsibility at the feet of the inflationary weak-dollar policy of the Federal Reserve. but he said that Smick ably identifies most of the crucial protectionist policy curves that threaten global prosperity.

Washington Post columnist David Ignatius said, "Economist David Smick had it right in The Post this week when he said the administration had a three-pronged strategy: delay, delay and delay." in 2009.

Columnist Michael Gerson of the Washington Post mentioned that "‘It's not smart to say this economy can’t recover,’ says economist and author David Smick. If the pipeline of credit is somehow unclogged, the Federal Reserve has provided plenty of money for there to be a quick recovery. Americans will eventually need to buy houses or cars again."

The New York Times Joe Nocera mentioned the book, noting that "In indignant tones, he talked to me about the sophisticated off-balance-sheet vehicles the banks used to hide risk and game the system, and the ‘mortgage-backed securities they were shoving out the door.’ He concluded, ‘I find their behavior just appalling.’ But words like ‘off-balance-sheet vehicles’ and ‘mortgage-backed securities’ don't have much meaning for most of us. What we understand is greed—which, ultimately, is what Mr. Smick was talking about as well."

Pete du Pont in the Wall Street Journal, posted that the book "shows that during the past quarter-century we have had a global ‘golden age of wealth creation and poverty reduction never before seen in the history of mankind.’ The global free market ‘experienced an unprecedented doubling of its labor force from 2.7 billion to 6 billion’; the U.S. had 40 million new jobs created; ‘the Dow Jones Industrial Average climbed from 800 to over 12,000’ (it is back under 9000 now); and, according to the Federal Reserve, U.S. households saw their net worth increase from $11 trillion in 1982 to more than $56 trillion today."
