= Ghemawat =

Ghemawat (Hindi: घेमावत) is an Indian surname.

Notable people with this surname include:

- Pankaj Ghemawat (born 1959), Indian-American economist
- Sanjay Ghemawat (born 1966), Indian-American computer scientist
