= David Smick =

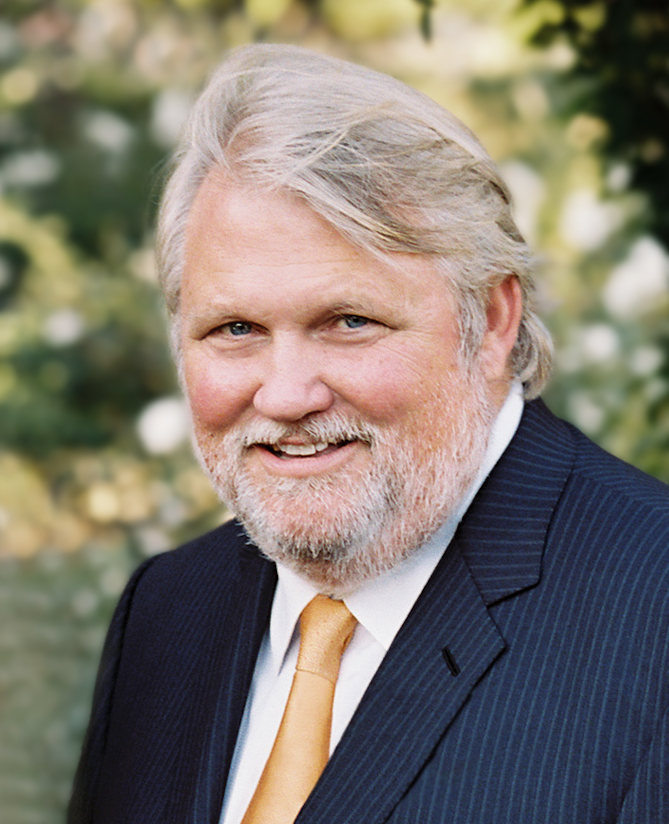
David M. Smick

David M. Smick, Sr. is an American global macroeconomic strategist, magazine publisher, best-selling author, and documentary filmmaker. He is the chairman and CEO of Johnson Smick International, a global strategic advisory firm in Washington, D.C., where he is in partnership with former Federal Reserve Vice Chairman Manuel H. Johnson. (The firm was originally known as Smick Medley International, Inc.)

The firm has provided strategic advice to some of the world's most successful investors, including Goldman Sachs, JPMorgan, Nomura Securities, Tiger Management, Duquesne Capital, and Moore Capital Management. Smick's first client was George Soros. Smick was closely involved with Soros Fund Management's role in the Black Wednesday 1992 sterling crisis.

Smick first registered to vote as a Democrat, switched to Republican during the Carter Administration, and is now a registered independent. He has worked on tax reform and on dollar policy solutions with legislators from both political parties.

== Career ==
In 1975, Smick arrived in Washington, D.C., to work as a staff member of the United States Senate. Beginning in 1978, at the age of 26, he served for five years as chief of staff to a member of the leadership of the United States House of Representatives.

In 1985, as a private consultant, Smick co-organized a series of prominent global monetary "summits", sponsored by both the U.S. Senate and House leadership, involving the industrialized world's finance ministers, central bankers, and foreign exchange experts. The first summit set the stage for the official 1985 Plaza Accord, the G5 agreement among the major industrialized nations to bring down the value of the dollar during heightened trade tensions. Washington Post correspondent Hobart Rowen wrote that the conference served as the “final nail in the coffin of the pure floating exchange rate system.”

Senator Bill Bradley (D-NJ), a prime co-sponsor of the summits, at a second event in Zurich, floated the idea of developing-world debt restructuring which, within several years, led to the issuance of the popular Brady Bonds. Those bonds helped lead to developing world economic renewal.

Smick is often referred to as a policy entrepreneur. In his 2018 op-ed in the Wall Street Journal, Smick was the first to introduce the idea of child investment accounts set up by the federal government to educate American youth on the concepts of saving and investment and the miracle of financial compounding. He argued that capitalism doesn’t need to be replaced but reimagined to allow for eventual greater blue-collar ownership. In 2000, Senator Cory Booker (D-NY) ran for president on the idea which he also called “Baby Bonds.” In 2027, Treasury Secretary Scott Bessent, a former Smick client, announced the proposal for “Trump accounts” based on the same concept.

In the 1980s, while chief of staff to Congressional leader Jack Kemp (R-NY) (who later became the vice presidential nominee), Smick spearheaded the introduction of a concept called “enterprise zones”— generous inner-city tax incentives to encourage business investment in blighted urban areas. The bipartisan proposal was enacted under President Ronald Reagan. Later President Barack Obama embraced the concept and changed the name to “Promise Zones.”

David Smick is the co-founder (1987), publisher, and editor of the distinguished quarterly magazine The International Economy, which the president of the European Central Bank Jean-Claude Trichet called ″both agenda-setting and inspiring.″

David Smick has written op-ed pieces for The New York Times, The Wall Street Journal, The Washington Post, and USA Today. He has appeared as a commentator on a variety of news outlets including CNN, CNBC, The Charlie Rose Show, Bloomberg News, Fox Business, and Morning Joe.

In 2020 (with help from Academy Award-winning director Barry Levinson who served as executive producer), Smick wrote and directed Stars and Strife, a full-length documentary that predicted a coming tidal wave of political, social, and economic division in America and throughout the industrialized world. Tom Friedman of the New York Times described the film as ″an incredible work.″ Stars and Strife was acquired by Lionsgate and premiered on Starz on September 21, 2020.

Smick's 2024 documentary America's Burning had its world premiere at the 2024 Tribeca Film Festival and was shown nationwide on Regal Cinemas. The film describes the economic reasons for America′s division including the weakening of the middle class and decline of the American Dream. Its bipartisan cast includes James Carville, Leon Panetta, James Baker, Katherine Gehl, Larry Summers, Stan Druckenmiller, Arthur C. Brooks, Rahm Emanuel, Ken Langone, Ian Bremmer, Hawk Newsome of Black Lives Matter of Greater New York, and many others. The film is executive produced by Academy Award-winners Michael Douglas and Barry Levinson, and narrated by Michael Douglas. David Ignatius of the Washington Post called the film ″incredibly powerful.″ Whoopi Goldberg on The View (talk show) labeled the film ″imperative.″ In 2025, Smick executive-produced the documentary Bucks County, USA, directed by Levinson. The film premiered at the 2025 Sundance Film Festival.

Smick′s first bestseller, The World Is Curved (2008), has been published in 32 languages and was described by David Brooks of The New York Times as "astonishingly prescient." The book discussed the financial perils of globalization and questioned whether the Wall Street banks were in full understanding of the values of the assets on their balance sheets. The book arrived during the 2008 financial crisis. President Bill Clinton called it "one of the three best books on the financial crisis." Smick's second bestseller, The Great Equalizer: How Main Street Capitalism Can Create an Economy for Everyone, argues that a ruthless corporate elite with deep political connections is rigging American capitalism, making it less dynamic and fair, producing a dangerous decline in social mobility and the loss of the American Dream.

== Personal life ==
Smick is married and has three children and six grandchildren.

== Books ==
- The Great Equalizer: How Main Street Capitalism Can Create an Economy for Everyone. New York: PublicAffairs. 2017. ISBN 978-1-61039-784-1.
- The World Is Curved: Hidden Dangers to the Global Economy. New York, N.Y: Penguin Portfolio. 2008. ISBN 978-1-59184-218-7.
