= Flat Classroom Project =

Flat Classroom Project is a global collaborative project for students in Grades 3 -12, inspired by Thomas Friedman's book, The World Is Flat, and leverages Web 2.0 tools to foster communication and interaction between students and teachers from classrooms around the world.

== About ==
The Flat Classroom Project was co-founded in 2006 by educators Vicki Davis (U.S.) and Julie Lindsay (Australia). It is a global collaborative project designed for students, typically in Grades 3 - 12, using Web 2.0 tools to support communication and collaboration between students and teachers from classrooms around the world. The project was inspired by Thomas Friedman's book The World Is Flat: A Brief History of the Twenty-First Century, and was featured in the 2007 update "Release 3.0" of that book. Currently, the project runs three times a year.

The project has gained recognition from the International Society of Technology Educators (ISTE), Taking IT Global, World Innovation Summit for Education, and Edublog Awards. It has fostered four similar projects, Digiteen, Eracism, NetGenEd, and A Week in the Life, based on the same holistic and constructivist educational approach.

The first spin-off of the NetGenEd Project (originally called the Horizon Project), examines the book Growing Up Digital by Don Tapscott, in conjunction with the New Media Consortium's annual Horizon Report.

Another spin-off effort is the Flat Classroom Conference which brings together geographically distant students that have participated in affiliated projects for a face-to-face meeting. At the conference, students share ideas and take part in theme-based workshops. The workshops are designed to explore global social issues and inspire unity and action, while advancing continued student-to-student and educator-to-educator connections.

=== Pedagogical approach ===
The goal of the Flat Classroom Project is to create global collaborative projects and maintain workspaces for students and educators around the world. The aim is to provide a bridge between students, educators, trainee teachers, and post-secondary education institutions.

By "flattening" the walls of the traditional classroom, participating classes are combined into a virtual classroom co-taught by participating teachers, via the Internet and a combination of synchronous and asynchronous communication tools. The project is designed to:

- develop cultural understanding;
- further skills with Web 2.0 and other software tools;
- provide experience in global collaboration and online learning;
- raise awareness of what it means to live and work in a globalized world; and
- encourage research and discussion around the ideas developed in Friedman's core text.

The core pedagogical approach includes the development of two primary products. The first product involves groups of students working collaboratively to compose a wiki web page based on topic research, and using Wikipedia as a model. The second product involves individual students creating a multimedia artifact including a portion requested by a student in another region, again based on topic research. Student work is assessed with common criteria-based rubrics and reviewed by a panel of international judges.

It is designed to be a multi-modal, interdisciplinary learning experience that highlights digital citizenship. Additionally, participating students are encouraged to develop Personal Learning Environments and Networks using Internet tools while conducting their research.

== A Week in the Life.... Project ==
With the success of the other projects, the Flat Classroom experience grew in popularity among elementary school teachers. During October 2010 to February 2011, eight international schools joined to plan and initiate the A Week in the Life.... project.

Schools Involved

- The Phoenix School - Salem, Massachusetts
- International School of Bombay - Mumbai, India
- Yew Chung International School of Beijing - China
- International School of Prague - Czech Republic
- Denton Avenue School - New York
- Falcon School for Girls - London, England
- Yarmouth Elementary School - Yarmouth, Maine
- Mill Creek School - Illinois

Five different categories: Food and Celebrations, Clothing, Transportation, School Life, and Housing, were chosen for the students to investigate and compare to those of other students in the project. Within each category, teams were created with members from each school with a teacher in charge. Synchronous and asynchronous methods were used to allow for collaboration among the students. Each team combined their information together into one artefact for their category, sharing their lives from around the world. The pilot project was developed into a regular project under the Flat Classroom umbrella.
