= The Lexus and the Olive Tree =

1999 book by Thomas Friedman

The Lexus and the Olive Tree: Understanding Globalization
- Author: Thomas L. Friedman
- Language: English
- Subject: International economic relations Free trade Capitalism–Social aspects Technological innovations–Economic aspects Technological innovations–Social aspects Intercultural communication Globalization; United States–Foreign economic relations
- Publisher: Farrar, Straus and Giroux
- Publication date: 1999
- Publication place: United States
- Media type: Hardcover
- Pages: 394
- ISBN: 0-374-19203-0
- OCLC: 40609510
- Dewey Decimal: 337 21
- LC Class: HF1359 .F74 1999
- Preceded by: From Beirut to Jerusalem
- Followed by: Longitudes and Attitudes

The Lexus and the Olive Tree: Understanding Globalization is a 1999 book by Thomas L. Friedman that posits that the world is currently undergoing two struggles: the drive for prosperity and development, symbolized by the Lexus LS, and the desire to retain identity and traditions, symbolized by the olive tree.

== Narrative ==
Friedman explains "globalization" by recounting stories of his actual experiences in interfacing with many of the global movers and shakers. He proposes that "globalization is not simply a trend or fad but is, rather, an international system. It is the system that has replaced the old Cold War system, and, like that Cold War System, globalization has its own rules and logic that today directly or indirectly influence the politics, environment, geopolitics and economics of virtually every country in the world."

The "Big Idea" in The Lexus and the Olive Tree is found on page 223 where Friedman explains that: "if you can't see the world, and you can't see the interactions that are shaping the world, you surely cannot strategize about the world." He states that "you need a strategy for how to choose prosperity for your country or company."

== Golden Arches theory ==
The book puts forward a capitalist peace theory, first published as an opinion piece in The New York Times in December 1996, called the Golden Arches Theory of Conflict Prevention; although slightly tongue-in-cheek, it states:

No two countries that both have a McDonald's have ever fought a war against each other.

He supported that observation, as a theory, by stating that when a country has reached an economic development where it has a middle class strong enough to support a McDonald's network, it would become a "McDonald's country", and will not be interested in fighting wars anymore.

Friedman's point is that due to globalization, countries that have made strong economic ties with one another have too much to lose to ever go to war with one another. Regardless of whether the statement is true, the conclusions to be drawn are unclear.

Shortly after the book was published, NATO bombed Yugoslavia. On the first day of the bombing, McDonald's restaurants in Belgrade were demolished by the Serbian people and were rebuilt only after the bombing ended. In the 2000 edition of the book, Friedman argued that this exception proved the rule: the war ended quickly, he argued, partly because the Serbian population did not want to lose their place in a global system "symbolized by McDonald's".

Critics have pointed to other conflicts as counterexamples, depending on what one considers "a war":

- The 1989 United States invasion of Panama
- In 1999, India and Pakistan fought a war over Kashmir, known as the Kargil War. Both countries had (and continue to have) McDonald's restaurants. Although the war was not fought in all possible theatres (such as the Rajasthan and Punjab borders), both countries mobilised their military all along their common borders and both countries made threats involving their nuclear capabilities.
- The 2006 war between Israel and Lebanon, following hostilities ongoing since 1973, with South Lebanon occupied until May 2000. (McDonald's franchises were established in Israel and Lebanon in 1993 and 1998, respectively.) However, the Lebanese Armed Forces were not a party to the fighting, the Israel Defense Forces action being taken instead against the paramilitary group Hezbollah.
- The 2008 Russo-Georgian War. Both countries had McDonald's at the time (restaurants began in the two countries in 1990 and 1999, respectively).
- The 2014 annexation of Crimea and War in Donbas between Russia and Ukraine. Both countries had McDonald's at the time. McDonald's closed its restaurants in the Crimean peninsula following the annexation.
- In 2022, Russia launched an invasion of Ukraine, bombing several major cities, including its capital city, Kyiv. At the time, Russia had 847 McDonald's outlets while Ukraine had 108. McDonald's suspended operations in Russia on March 8, 2022. The war later prompted McDonald's to announce, on May 16, 2022, that it would permanently leave Russia. McDonald's Russia was later sold and rebranded as Vkusno i tochka.
- In 2023, as part of the Middle Eastern crisis, an escalation of tensions has erupted with Israeli Defence Forces and Hezbollah of Lebanon started regular bombing campaigns against each other both with the presence of McDonald's outlets.
- In 2025, India launched a missile strike against Pakistan. Both countries still maintained their McDonald's restaurants.
- The Israeli bombing of Qatar as spillover to Gaza War. McDonald's is present in both Israel and Qatar.

Friedman also explains how globalization can cause "Brazilification" — the loss of the middle class and increase in income gap—of countries impacted by the trend. Brazilification is a neologism included in Douglas Coupland's 1991 book Generation X: Tales for an Accelerated Culture. The expression was used in a similar way by the American writer Michael Lind as "Brazilianisation of America" in his book The Next American Nation and by the German sociologist Ulrich Beck as "Brasilianisierung des Westens" in his book Schöne neue Arbeitswelt (transl. Brave new world of work).

In 2005, Friedman said that he framed this theory in terms of McDonald's Golden Arches "with tongue slightly in cheek". In his 2005 book The World Is Flat he offered an updated theory he labelled the Dell Theory of Conflict Prevention.

== See also ==
- Olympic Truce
- Islam and modernity
- List of countries with McDonald's franchises
- Technocapitalism

=== Books of the time with competing theories ===
- Benjamin Barber, Jihad vs. McWorld (1995)
- Francis Fukuyama, The End of History and the Last Man (1992)
- Thomas Friedman, The World Is Flat
- Samuel P. Huntington, Clash of Civilizations
