= From Beirut to Jerusalem =

1989 book by Thomas Friedman

- First edition
- Author: Thomas L. Friedman
- Language: English
- Subject: Lebanon, Israel, Palestine
- Genre: Current affairs, memoir
- Publisher: Farrar, Straus & Giroux; Anchor Books (1990)
- Publication date: 1989; August 1990 (first paperback, expanded)
- Publication place: United States
- Media type: Print
- Pages: 541 (1990)
- ISBN: 0-385-41372-6 (1990)
- Followed by: The Lexus and the Olive Tree

From Beirut to Jerusalem (1989) is a book by American journalist Thomas L. Friedman chronicling his days as a reporter in Beirut during the Lebanese Civil War and in Jerusalem through the first year of the Intifada.

Friedman wrote a 17-page epilogue for the first paperback edition (Anchor Books, 1990) concerning the potential for peaceful resolution in Israel and Palestine.

== Reception ==
It received the 1989 National Book Award for Nonfiction and also the Cornelius Ryan Award. In a book review for The Village Voice, Edward Said criticized what he saw as a naïve, arrogant, and orientalist account of the Israel–Palestine conflict.
