= Le Mondain =

1736 philosophical poem by Voltaire

- by Voltaire
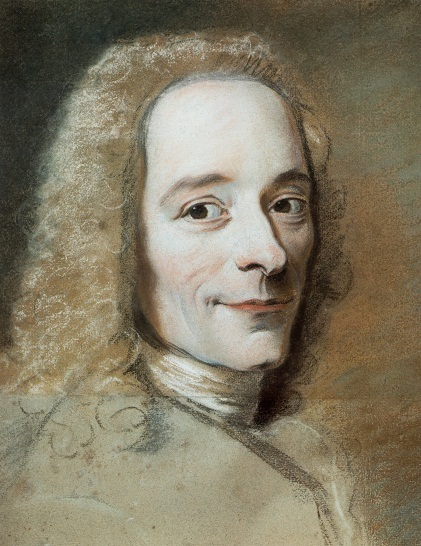
- Portrait of Voltaire from 1735, by Maurice Quentin de La Tour
- Written: 1736
- First published in: 1736
- Country: France
- Language: French
- Subject(s): philosophy, paradise

"Le Mondain" ("The Worldling" or "The Man of the World") is a philosophical poem written by French enlightenment writer and philosopher Voltaire in 1736. It satirises Christian imagery, including the story of Adam and Eve, to defend a way of life focused on worldly pleasure rather than the promised pleasure of a religion's afterlife. It opposes religious morality and especially the teaching of original sin. Its points echo Voltaire's prose works Lettres philosophiques and Remarques sur Pascal. Voltaire noted a trend against using poetic forms to make philosophical arguments, and wrote "Le Mondain" in deliberate opposition to this trend.

== Content ==
The poem is set in the Garden of Eden but, contrary to the teaching of original sin, Eden is not portrayed as a paradise from which man would be expelled, but a state of barbarity. Adam's nails are described as long and dirty since no one has yet invented a tool to trim or clean them. The implication is that the world we experience is hence not a prison into which we have been thrown as punishment. Instead, the poem's closing line says, "Le paradis terrestre est où je suis" ("The earthly paradise is where I am").

== Reaction ==
Line 22 of the poem, "Le superflu, chose très-nécessaire" ("The superfluous, a very necessary thing"), became a common catch-phrase.

Responding to hostile reactions in 1737, Voltaire wrote a poem in the same style, Défense du Mondain ou l'apologie du luxe ("Defense of the Worldling or an Apology for Luxury"). The themes of the two are somewhat different; "Le Mondain" focusing on the personal benefits of worldly pleasure, while the Défense talks about the social benefits of seeking pleasure.

The French dramatist Alexis Piron wrote a poem in response, L'Antimondain, in 1738.

The poem's publication caused a scandal which led to Voltaire fleeing in 1738 from the Château de Cirey in France to Brussels, where he spent three months before returning.

The poem has been described as embracing the doux commerce philosophy.

== Published editions ==
- "Le Mondain" – Critical edition by Haydn T. Mason, in Œuvres complètes de Voltaire, Volume 16 (Voltaire Foundation, Oxford) ISBN 0729407942
