= Michael Mandelbaum =

American foreign policy expert (born 1946)

- Education: Yale University; King's College, Cambridge; Harvard University
- Occupation: Foreign policy expert
- Awards: Christian A. Herter

Michael Mandelbaum (born 1946) is a professor and director of the American Foreign Policy program at the Johns Hopkins University, School of Advanced International Studies. He has written a number of books on American foreign policy and edited a dozen more.

== Education ==
Mandelbaum was educated at Yale University and King's College, Cambridge, where he was a Marshall Scholar and earned a BA in history in 1970. He later earned a PhD in political science from Harvard University.

== Career ==
Mandelbaum was named one of the top 100 Global Thinkers by Foreign Policy magazine "for teaching America how to be a hegemon on the cheap." He is on the board of directors of the Washington Institute for Near East Policy.

Mandelbaum worked on security issues at the US Department of State from 1982 to 1983 on a Council on Foreign Relations International Affairs Fellowship in the office of Undersecretary of State Lawrence Eagleburger. He later served as an adviser to Bill Clinton.

Speaking on behalf of the United States Information Agency for more than two decades, Mandelbaum has explained American foreign policy to groups throughout Europe, East Asia, Australia, New Zealand, India, and the Middle East.

From 1986 to 2003, he was a senior fellow at the Council on Foreign Relations in New York, where he was also the director of its Project on East-West Relations. Mandelbaum was then a Carnegie Scholar (2004–2005) of the Carnegie Corporation of New York. From 1984 to 2005, he was the associate director of the Aspen Institute's Congressional Program on Relations with the Former Communist World.

He has taught at Harvard University, Columbia University, and the US Naval Academy. He also taught business executives at the Wharton Advanced Management Program in the Aresty Institute of Executive Education at the Wharton School of Business at the University of Pennsylvania.

Mandelbaum is a frequent commentator on American foreign policy. From 1985 to 2005, he wrote a regular foreign affairs analysis column for Newsday. His writing has also appeared in The New York Times, The Wall Street Journal, The Washington Post, Time, and the Los Angeles Times. He has appeared as a guest on The Daily Show with Jon Stewart, Charlie Rose, Nightline, and PBS NewsHour.

== Writing ==
External videos
- Booknotes interview with Mandelbaum on The Ideas That Conquered the World, October 20, 2002, C-SPAN
- Presentation by Mandelbaum on The Ideas That Conquered the World, January 31, 2003, C-SPAN
- After Words interview with Mandelbaum on The Case for Goliath, April 1, 2006, C-SPAN
- Discussion with Mandelbaum on The Frugal Superpower, October 7, 2010, C-SPAN
- Presentation by Mandelbaum and Thomas Friedman on That Used to Be Us, September 27, 2011, C-SPAN
- Washington Journal interview with Mandelbaum and Friedman on That Used to Be Us, September 28, 2011, C-SPAN
- Interview with Mandelbaum and Friedman on That Used to Be Us, September 22, 2012, C-SPAN
- Washington Journal interview with Mandelbaum on The Road to Global Prosperity, April 17, 2014, C-SPAN
- Presentation by Mandelbaum on The Road to Global Prosperity, May 27, 2014, C-SPAN
- Presentation by Mandelbaum on Mission Failure, September 16, 2016, C-SPAN
- Presentation by Mandelbaum on The Rise and Fall of Peace on Earth, March 27, 2019, C-SPAN

His first book, The Nuclear Question: The United States and Nuclear Weapons, was published in 1979. The Economist called it "an excellent history of American nuclear policy... a clear, readable book."

In 1988, he published The Fate of Nations: The Search for National Security in the 19th and 20th Centuries. Publishers Weekly said, "Mandelbaum's book is brilliant and enjoyable...[he] charts how nations find ways of acting together in diplomatically organized groups for defensive purposes, and he analyses certain countries' specific roles and histories. His knowledge of philosophy, politics, history and economics results in a stunning delineation of centuries of military actions, political maneuverings and cultural uprisings." In 1996, he wrote The Dawn of Peace in Europe. Walter Russell Mead in The New York Times Book Review, called it a "brilliant book that combines the most lucid exposition yet of the post-cold-war order in Europe with a devastating critique of the Clinton Administration's foreign policy."

In 2002, he published The Ideas That Conquered the World: Peace, Democracy and Free Markets in the Twenty-first Century. The New York Times Book Review said, "A formidable and thought-provoking tour d'horizon. Best of all, it gives readers something to argue about." In 2006, he wrote The Case for Goliath: How America Acts as the World's Government in the Twenty-First Century, in which he argued that US dominance in global affairs is better than the alternatives.

In 2010, he wrote The Frugal Superpower: America's Global Leadership in a Cash-Strapped Era, in which he argued that the 2008 financial crisis and economic obligations will redraw the boundaries of US foreign policy. Published in 2011, That Used to Be Us addresses four major problems faced by America: globalization, the revolution in information technology, US chronic deficits, and its pattern of energy consumption.

== Bibliography ==
Books

- The Nuclear Question: the United States and Nuclear Weapons, 1946–1976. Cambridge University Press. 1979.
- The Nuclear Revolution: International Politics Before and After Hiroshima (1981)
- The Nuclear Future (1983)
- Reagan and Gorbachev (Co-written with Strobe Talbott 1987)
- The Global Rivals: The Soviet American Contest for Supremacy (Co-written with Seweryn Bialer 1988)
- The Fate of Nations: The Search for National Security in the 19th and 20th Centuries (Cambridge University Press, 1988) ISBN 9780521355278, OCLC 247933640
- The Dawn of Peace in Europe (1996)
- The Ideas That Conquered the World: Peace, Democracy and Free Markets in the Twenty-First Century (2002)
- The Meaning of Sports: Why Americans Watch Baseball, Basketball and Football and What They See When They Do (2005)
- The Case for Goliath: How America Acts As the World's Government in the Twenty-First Century (Public Affairs, 2006) ISBN 9781586484583, OCLC 870414060
- Democracy’s Good Name: The Rise and Risks of the World's Most Popular Form of Government (Public Affairs, 2007) ISBN 9781586486648, OCLC 209638111
- The Frugal Superpower: America's Global Leadership in a Cash-Strapped Era (2010) ISBN 9781610390545, OCLC 720831376
- That Used to Be Us: How America Fell Behind in the World It Invented and How We Can Come Back (Co-written with Thomas Friedman 2011)
- The Road to Global Prosperity (2014) ISBN 9781476750019. OCLC 907454893
- Mission Failure: America and the World in the Post-Cold War Era (Oxford University Press, 2016) ISBN 9781504755634, OCLC 962743515
- The Rise and Fall of Peace on Earth (Oxford University Press, 2019) ISBN 9780190935931, OCLC 1044864332
- The Four Ages of American Foreign Policy: Weak Power, Great Power, Superpower, Hyperpower (Oxford University Press, 2022), ISBN 9780197621790, OCLC 1298714782
- The Titans of the Twentieth Century: How They Made History and the History They Made (Oxford University Press, 2024), ISBN 9780197782477, OCLC 1434746191

Critical studies and reviews of Mandelbaum's work Mission failure

- Tangredi, Sam J. (Summer 2018). "Failures and successes". Book Reviews. Naval War College Review. 71 (3): 146–148.
