= Ed Miracle =

American painter

- Education: Self taught
- Known for: Painting and sculpture
- Patrons: Khalid Al Qassimi, Frank Sinatra, George C. Scott

Ed Miracle is a self-taught American artist who creates paintings and sculptures as well as other works. He is a Navy veteran. Legal issues involving one of his paintings being used for the book cover of The World Is Flat were settled quietly in March 2006. He has a residence in Longboat Key, Florida.

== See also ==
- Riverwalk (Fort Lauderdale)
