= Curiosity quotient =

Term conceived by Thomas L. Friedman

Curiosity quotient is a term put forth by author and journalist Thomas L. Friedman as part of an illustrative formula to explain how individuals can be powerfully motivated to learn about a personally interesting subject, whether or not they possess a particularly high intelligence quotient (IQ). The non-mathematical and fictitious formula is CQ + PQ > IQ; where CQ is "curiosity quotient" and PQ is "passion quotient." Thomas Friedman states that when curiosity is paired with passion in the exploration of a subject of interest, an individual may be able to acquire an amount of knowledge comparable to that of a person who is exceptionally intelligent, because of the vast amount of information resources available through the Internet. This formula is not meant to be taken in a literal sense, nor is it a measurement tool for assessing or predicting the intelligence, productivity or success of a student, employee or individual.

== Proposed formula ==
Thomas Friedman's formula for CQ

Friedman's claim is that Curiosity quotient plus Passion quotient is greater than Intelligence Quotient.

There is no evidence that this inequality is true. Friedman may believe that curiosity and passion are 'greater' than intelligence, but there is no evidence to suggest that the sum of a person's curiosity and passion quotients will always exceed their IQ. Indeed, given the ordinal nature of psychometric quotients, it is not clear whether it makes sense to add the curiosity and passion quotients or even if they can have numerical values attributed to them.

According to Friedman, curiosity and passion are key components for education in a world where information is readily available to everyone and where global markets reward those who have learned how to learn and are self-motivated to learn.

Friedman states, "Give me the kid with a passion to learn and a curiosity to discover and I will take him or her over the less passionate kid with a huge IQ every day of the week." IQ "still matters, but CQ and PQ ... matter even more." Friedman further states that "it is more important to be passionate and curious than to be merely smart."
