= That Used to Be Us =

2011 book by Michael Mandelbaum and Thomas Friedman

That Used to be Us: How America Fell Behind in the World It Invented and How We Can Come Back
- Author: Thomas Friedman and Michael Mandelbaum
- Publisher: Picador

That Used to be Us: How America Fell Behind in the World It Invented and How We Can Come Back is a nonfiction book written by Thomas Friedman, a Pulitzer Prize-winning New York Times columnist and author, with Michael Mandelbaum, a writer and foreign policy professor at Johns Hopkins University. They published the book on September 5, 2011, in the United States. It addresses what the authors see as the four major problems America faces today, and possible solutions. These problems are defined as: globalization, the revolution in information technology, the nation's chronic deficits, and its pattern of energy consumption.

Praise appeared in The Christian Science Monitor as well as Friedman's home paper, The New York Times, while criticism appeared in The Wall Street Journal.

== Contents ==
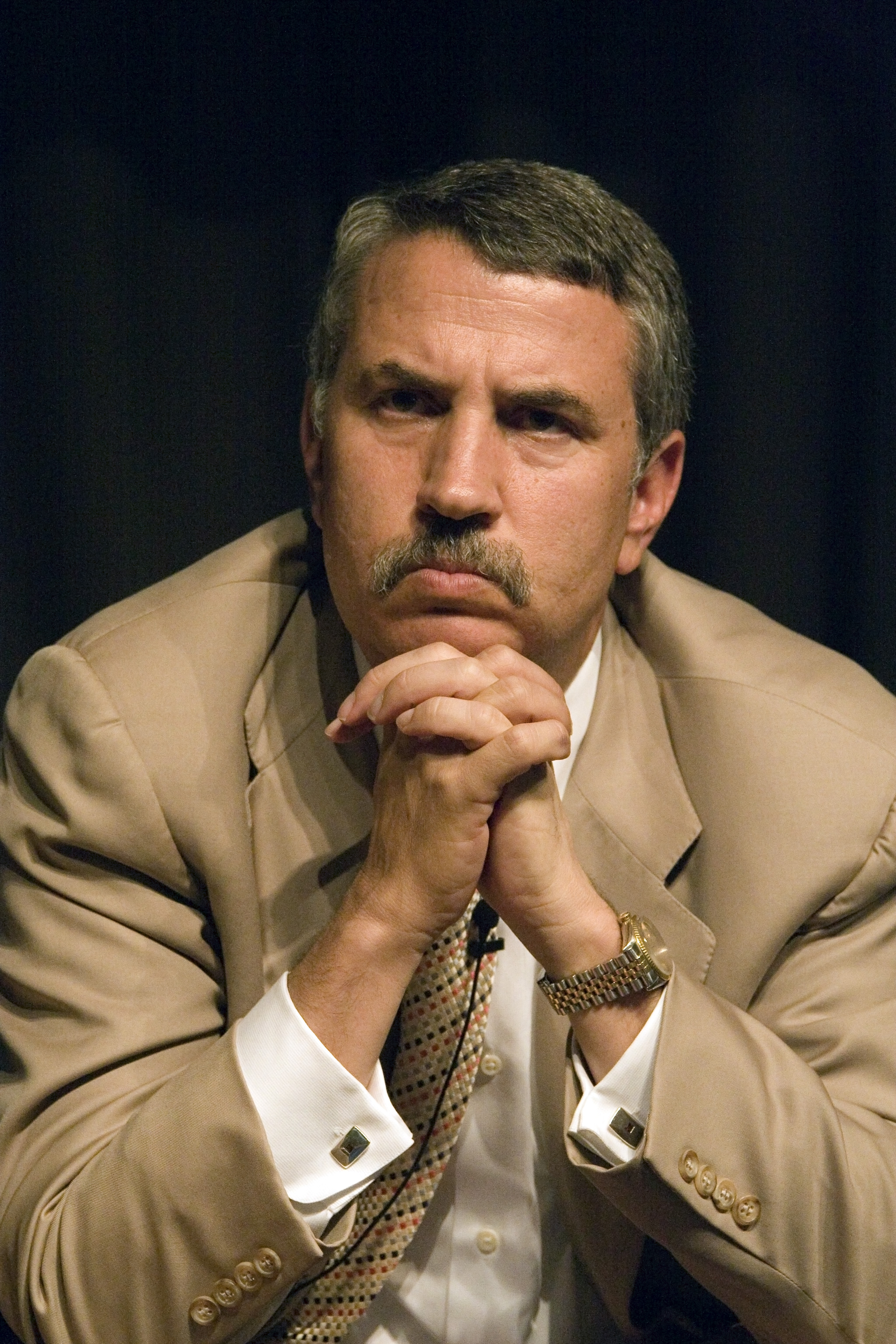
Co-author Thomas Friedman pictured in May 2005.

The authors write in support of what they view as the 'radical center'. They describe picking out ideas from both the left and right parts of the modern American political spectrum. They state, "Americans will have to save more, consume less, study longer, and work harder than they have become accustomed to doing in recent decades".

In terms of details, they advocate a variety of measures that may prove unpopular such as carefully planned tax increases. In general, they write that Americans must "invest in education, infrastructure, and research and development, as well as open our society more widely to talented immigrants and fix the regulations that govern our economy" given that "[i]mmigration, education, and sensible regulation are traditional ingredients of the American formula for greatness."

The authors state that America needs to implement changes and the only way that this is going to have a long-term impact is with a major wake-up call that gets people's attention: "Our big challenges today require the kind of national responses that wars have evoked, but without a major ongoing conflict it will be difficult to mobilize the American people to make the difficult policy choices needed to meet them." There is a call for true investment in this statement.

== Reviews ==
The Wall Street Journal ran a mixed to negative review by author and journalist Andrew Ferguson. Ferguson remarked that "Friedman can turn a phrase into cliché faster than any Madison Avenue jingle writer", specifically criticizing the repetition of the metaphor 'War on X', and he also stated that "the authors' frustration is unoriginal and ill-defined" since complaints about underfunded American infrastructure such as "potholes and schools have been favorites of declinists for generations." However, Ferguson lauded the sense of optimism in the book "about the American future", which Ferguson views as "always the safest bet.

Journalist Gregory M. Lamb wrote in praise of the book for The Christian Science Monitor. He stated that the authors "do a masterly job of explaining just what's wrong and why our nation is on the brink of tragedy." He argued as well, "They employ lively examples and telling statistics to make their points, and buttress them with incisive quotes from those inside America’s political system."

Walter Russell Mead, a professor at Bard College and the editor-at-large of The American Interest, wrote for Friedman's home paper The New York Times that he found the book "compelling, engaging and enlightening." However, Mead criticized that, in his opinion, people with differing views than the authors "are denigrated rather than engaged"; he specifically describes ignored examples of the limitations of government power such as how "energy regulations contribute to the gridlock that is driving California’s economy down" and how "lobbyists and private interests distorted Fannie Mae mortgage programs in ways that worsened the housing bubble". Yet he still remarked, "The authors provide a thoughtful and balanced corrective to critics on the left who believe that our present economic troubles demonstrate the fundamental failure of the liberal democratic capitalist ideas on which American society is built, and the critics on the right who believe that only a return to 19th-century small government policies can save us."

== See also ==
- The World Is Flat
- Hot, Flat, and Crowded
- Radical center politics
