= America's Burning =

2024 documentary film

- Film poster
- Directed by: David Smick
- Produced by: Ian Michaels
- Narrated by: Michael Douglas
- Cinematography: Robert Brinkmann; Ben Hardwicke; Ray Wongchinda
- Edited by: Ron Vignone
- Distributed by: Abramorama
- Release date: June 9, 2024 (Tribeca Festival)
- Running time: 83 minutes
- Country: United States

America's Burning is a 2024 American documentary film directed by David Smick. It premiered at the 2024 Tribeca Festival and was released in theaters on July 12, 2024. Michael Douglas is an executive producer and the narrator.

== Synopsis ==
According to the film's poster, it is "about the American Dream".
