= Pankaj Ghemawat =

Indian-American economist (born 1959)

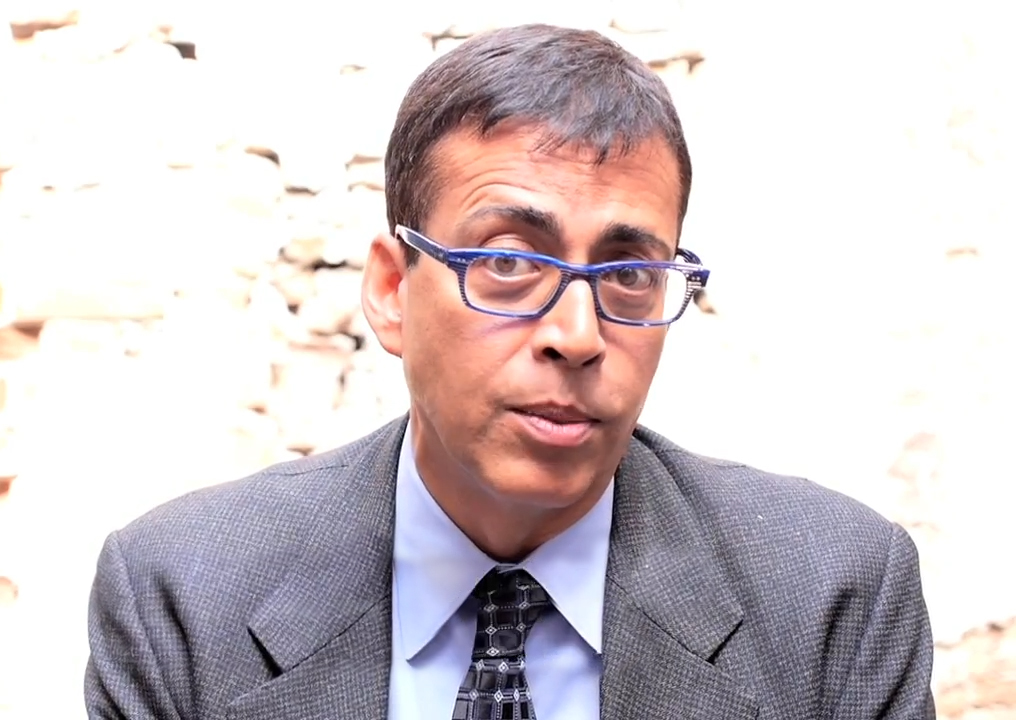
- Born: 30 September 1959 (age 66); Jodhpur, India
- Education: Harvard University (BS, PhD)
- Occupations: Economist, strategist, author

Pankaj Ghemawat (born 30 September 1959) is an Indian-American economist, professor, global strategist, speaker and author known for his work in the study of globalization. He created the DHL Global Connectedness Index and the CAGE Distance Framework.

He is the global professor of management and strategy and director of the Center for the Globalization of Education and Management at the Stern School of Business at New York University, and the Anselmo Rubiralta Professor of Global Strategy at IESE Business School. Ghemawat previously served on the faculty of Harvard Business School, where he was the youngest person ever appointed a full professorship.

== Early life and education ==
Born in India, Ghemawat spent parts of his childhood in India and in Indiana, where the family lived while his father pursued a PhD at Purdue University. Sanjay Ghemawat is his younger brother.

Ghemawat received his bachelor's degree in Applied Mathematics and his Ph.D. in business economics from Harvard University. Entering Harvard College at the age of 16, he was accepted to Harvard Business School's Ph.D. in Business Economics program at 19, graduating three years later.

After a two-year stint at McKinsey & Company in London, he spent 25 years on the full-time faculty at Harvard Business School. Since 2006, Ghemawat has been the Anselmo Rubiralta Professor of Global Strategy at IESE Business School in Barcelona. In 2013, he was appointed as distinguished visiting professor of global management at Stern School of Business, New York University.

== Career and research ==
Ghemawat has devoted much of his career to studying globalization and its effects on national economies. In 2011 he introduced the DHL Global Connectedness Index, which emphasizes analysis of hard data to measure the global connectedness of countries around the world.

Key ideas of his work include:

- While globalization is expanding after a steep drop during the world financial crisis, it is less widespread and is growing more slowly than widely believed.
- Countries with greater global connectedness tend to grow faster than those with less connectedness.

Much of Ghemawat's work serves as a counterpoint to journalist Thomas Friedman’s contention in his book The World is Flat that globalization is a fast-growing and dominant force in the 21st century economy. In 2009 Ghemawat published the article Why the World Isn’t Flat in Foreign Policy. In 2012 Ghemawat gave a TED talk entitled Actually, the World Isn’t Flat. In these and other works, Ghemawat cited the measures of global connectedness compiled in his research to show that globalization is less widespread than generally thought. He has revived the term "globaloney", coined in the 1940s by Clare Boothe Luce, to refer to these misconceptions.

Beginning in 2016 Ghemawat has turned his attention to the effects of isolationist and nationalist movements such as the United Kingdom's Brexit vote and the policies of President Donald Trump on trade, globalization, and economic growth.

Pankaj Ghemawat's books include Commitment (Free Press, 1991), Games Businesses Play (MIT Press, 1998), Strategy and the Business Landscape (Pearson Prentice Hall, 3rd edition, 2009), the award-winning Redefining Global Strategy (Harvard Business School Press, 2007), and World 3.0 Global Prosperity And How To Achieve It (Harvard Business Press, 2011), which continues to receive international acclaim.

Ghemawat is also a prolific case writer and have featured among the top 40 case authors consistently, since the list was first published in 2016 by The Case Centre. He ranked 24th In 2018/19, 25th in 2017/18, 14th in 2016/17 and 15th in 2015/16.

== Honours, awards, and memberships ==
2008

- Irwin Award for the Educator of the Year from the Business Policy and Strategy Division of the Academy of Management
- IESE-Fundación BBVA Economics for Management Prize
- Elected fellow of the Strategic Management Society

2006–2007

- McKinsey Award for best article published in Harvard Business Review
- Elected fellow of the Academy of International Business

== Publications ==
=== Books ===
- The New Global Road Map: Enduring Strategies for Turbulent Times, Harvard Business Review Press, Boston, 2018.
- The Laws of Globalization and Business Applications, Cambridge University Press, New York, 2016.
- World 3.0: Global Prosperity and How to Achieve it, Harvard Business Press Books, Boston, 2011.
- Strategy and the Business Landscape (3rd edition), Pearson Prentice Hall, 2009.
- Redefining Global Strategy, Harvard Business School Press, Boston, 2007.
- Games Businesses Play, MIT Press, Cambridge, 1998.
- Commitment, Free Press, 1991.

=== Articles ===
- Is America Enriching the World at its Own Expense? That’s Globaloney, (with Steven Altman), Washington Post, 3 February 2017.
- Even In a Digital World, Globalization is Not Inevitable, Harvard Business Review, 1 February 2017.
- If Trump Abandons the TPP, China Will Be the Biggest Winner, Harvard Business Review, 12 December 2016.
- Trump, Globalization, and Trade’s Uncertain Future, Harvard Business Review, 11 November 2016.
- People Are Angry About Globalization. Here's What to Do About It, Harvard Business Review, 6 November 2016.
- How Global Is Your C-Suite? (with Herman Vantrappen), MIT Sloan Management Review, 16 June 2015.
- Why the World Isn't Flat, 14 October 2009, Foreign Policy.
