= Doux commerce =

Enlightenment theory linking trade to peaceful behavior

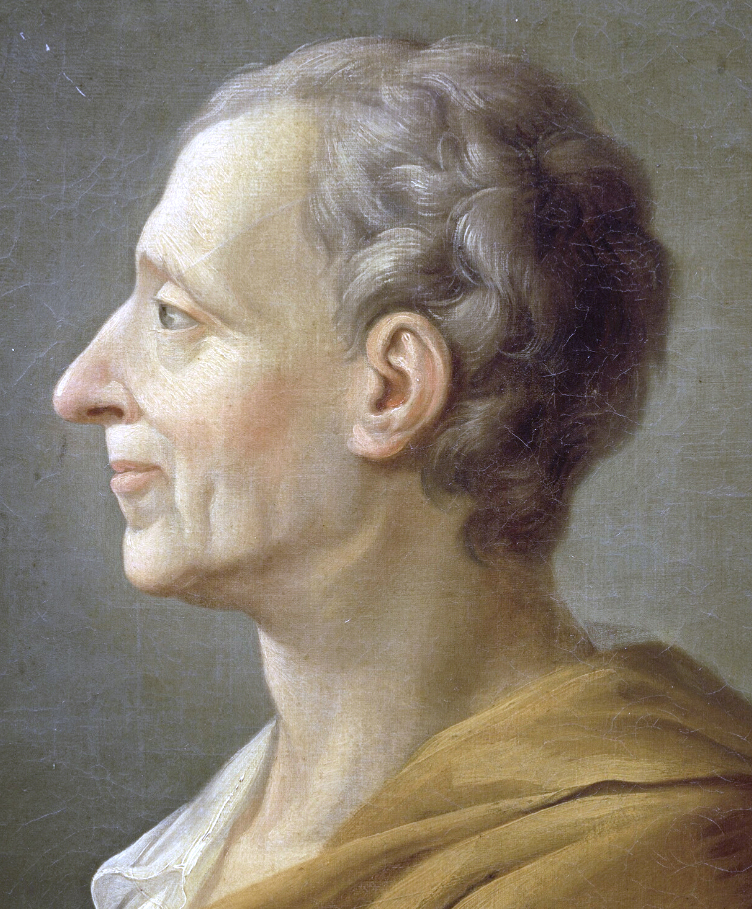
French Enlightenment philosopher Montesquieu has been credited as one of the chief proponents of the doux commerce theory.

Doux commerce (lit. sweet commerce) is a concept originating from the Age of Enlightenment stating that commerce tends to civilize people, making them less likely to resort to violent or irrational behaviors. This theory has also been referred to as commercial republicanism.

== Origin and meaning ==
Proponents of the doux commerce theory argued that the spread of trade and commerce will decrease violence, including open warfare. Montesquieu wrote, for example, that "wherever the ways of man are gentle, there is commerce; and wherever there is commerce, there the ways of men are gentle" and "The natural effect of commerce is to lead to peace". Thomas Paine argued that "If commerce were permitted to act to the universal extent it is capable, it would extirpate the system of war". Engaging in trade has been described as "civilizing" people, which has been related to virtues such as being "reasonable and prudent; less given to political and, especially, religious enthusiasm; more reliable, honest, thrifty, and industrious". In the greater scheme of things, trade was seen as responsible for ensuring stability, tolerance, reciprocity and fairness.

It is not clear when this term was coined. Writings of Jacques Savary, a 17th-century French merchant, have been suggested as one possible origin but similar use has been traced earlier, for example to a Renaissance-era 16th century work by Michel de Montaigne. The basic idea that trade lessens the chance for conflict between nations can be traced as far as writings of Ancient Greece. It became popular in the 17th century writings of some scholars from the Age of Enlightenment, and has been endorsed by thinkers like Montesquieu, Voltaire, Smith, and Hume, as well as Immanuel Kant. It has been discussed in their essays and literary works; for example Voltaire's poem Le Mondain (1736) has been described as endorsing the doux commerce theory. Out of those, Montesquieu has been argued to be the writer most responsible for the spread of this idea in his influential Spirit of Law (1748), and the theory is sometimes described as "Montesquieu's doux commerce." (although Montesquieu did not use the term itself).

In modern scholarship, the term has been analyzed by the German economist Albert Hirschman in his 1977 work The Passions and the Interests: Political Arguments For Capitalism Before Its Triumph. Hirschman is credited with summarizing the doux commerce argument for the modern readers and popularizing the term in modern discourse.

== Critique ==
At the same time, even Montesquieu and other proponents of trade from the Enlightenment era cautioned that some social effects of commerce may be negative, for example commodification, conspicuous consumption, or erosion of interest in non-commercial affairs. Edmund Burke offered the following critique of the doux commerce idea: that it is not commerce that civilizes humans, it is that humans are civilized through culture, which enables them to engage in commerce.

This theory led to trade becoming associated with peaceful and inoffensive activities representative of the "civilized" West European nations; which has however been criticized by later scholars as omitting the facts that much of the said "gentle" trade and resulting prosperity was built on activities like the slave trade and colonial exploitation. Trade, however civilized its origins, can give rise to trade wars and to hot wars.

== Empirical evidence ==
The doux commerce theory continues to be debated in the modern times. The question of whether commerce's impact on the society is net positive or net negative has no conclusive answer. Mark Movsesian noted that "as Hirschman once suggested, the doux commerce thesis is right and wrong at the same time: the market both promotes and corrupts good morals."

However, a growing body of empirical research provides support for the doux commerce hypothesis using historical analysis, cross-cultural experiments, and field studies. Posch and Raz (2025) analyze historical U.S. data from 1850–1920 and find that increased market integration fostered cultural traits that supports cooperation with strangers and shifted cooperation away from kin-based toward broader and more generalized forms. Henrich et al. (2010) show in diverse societies that market reliance is associated with fairer behavior. Enke (2022) uses folklore data across many societies to demonstrate that market exposure is linked to more impartial moral norms. Rustagi (2024) finds a positive relationship between market proximity and civic values in 52 villages in Ethiopia. Focusing on small villages in Greenland, Agneman and Chervort-Bianco (2023) find correlation with honesty. Other studies find that market participation influences political attitudes, ethnic relationships, and trust.

== See also ==
- Capitalist peace
- Classic liberalism
- Economic liberalism
- Economic liberalization
- Gains from trade
- Mercantilism
- Moral progress
- Peace economics
- Wandel durch Handel
