= Seweryn Bialer =

German-born American academic (1926–2019)

Seweryn Bialer (November 3, 1926 in Berlin – February 8, 2019 in New York City) was a German-born American academic. He was emeritus professor of political science at Columbia University and an expert on the Communist parties of the Soviet Union and Poland. He was the Director of Columbia's Research Institute on International Change.

== Biography ==
Born in Berlin, Germany, Bialer joined the underground anti-fascist movement in Lodz, Poland in 1942. Between February 1944 and May 1945 he was a prisoner in the Auschwitz concentration camp.

From May 1945 to June 1951 he was member of the Polish communist police force (the Milicja Obywatelska). He also held various positions in the Polish Communist Party (PZPR). He was a political officer of the State Police in Warsaw and a member of the Central Committee of the Polish Worker's Party. Subsequently, beginning in June 1951, he became a Professor at the Institute of Sociology and political editor of the newspaper Trybuna Ludu. He was also a researcher in economics at the Polish Academy of Sciences. During this time he authored several political science textbooks.

In January, 1956, Bialer defected to West Berlin and conducted almost one-year-long interview sessions for Radio Free Europe/Radio Liberty in New York, which was broadcast to Poland during that year.

He moved to New York, eventually receiving a Ph.D. in political science from Columbia. He was appointed Robert and Renee Belfer Professor of Political Science. In 1983 he was awarded a prestigious MacArthur Fellowship. He was elected a Fellow of the American Academy of Arts and Sciences in 1984.

He died in February 2019 at the age of 92.

== Harassment allegations ==
In 1986, an anonymous female graduate student at Columbia filed a formal grievance against Bialer for sexual harassment. The grievance alleged that less than two weeks after beginning to work with the student, Bialer rescheduled a meeting to take place at his apartment, during which he offered alcohol and removed his trousers. The harassment reportedly continued for another three semesters until the student began working with a different professor in a different specialty. Bialer received only a warning from the department and continued his position at Columbia.

== Selected works ==
=== Books ===
- The Domestic Context of Soviet Foreign Policy. Westview Press. 1981. ISBN 9780891588917. Editor.
- Stalin's Successors: Leadership, Stability and Change in the Soviet Union. Cambridge University Press. 1982. ISBN 9780521289061.
- Stalin and His Generals: Soviet Military Memoirs of World War II. Pegasus. 1983. ISBN 978-0672535970. Editor.
- Soviet Paradox: External Expansion, Internal Decline. I.B. Tauris. 1986. ISBN 9781850430308.
- Gorbachev's Russia and American Foreign Policy. Westview Press. 1988. ISBN 9780813307480. Edited with Michael Mandelbaum.

=== Essay ===
- Dallin, Alexander; Lapidus, Gail W., eds. (1995). "Domestic and International Factors in the Formation of Gorbachev's Reforms'". The Soviet System. From Crisis to Collapse (2nd revised ed.). Westview Press. ISBN 9780813318769.
