= CAGE Distance Framework =

International corporate strategy

The CAGE Distance Framework identifies Cultural, Administrative, Geographic and Economic differences or distances between countries that companies should address when crafting international strategies. It may also be used to understand patterns of trade, capital, information, and people flows. The framework was developed by Pankaj Ghemawat, a professor at the University of Navarra - IESE Business School in Barcelona, Spain.

The impacts of CAGE distances and differences have been demonstrated quantitatively via gravity models. Such models "resemble Newton's law of gravitation in linking interactions between countries to the product of their sizes (usually their gross domestic products) divided by some composite measure of distance."

== Components ==
The table shown below provides more detail on each of the CAGE categories, and how they can manifest themselves depending on whether one is comparing a pair of countries or looking at one in isolation. One of the distinctions between the CAGE Framework and other country analysis frameworks is its inclusion of bilateral as well as unilateral factors.

	Cultural Distance	Administrative Distance	Geographic Distance	Economic Distance
Country Pairs (Bilateral)	Different languages; Different ethnicities; lack of connective ethnic or social networks; Different religions; Lack of trust; Different values, norms, and dispositions	Lack of colonial ties; Lack of shared regional trading bloc; Lack of common currency; Political hostility	Physical distance; Lack of land border; Differences in time zones; Differences in climates / disease environments	Rich/poor differences; Other differences in cost or quality of natural resources, financial resources, human resources, infrastructure, information or knowledge
Countries (Unilateral / Multilateral)	Insularity; Traditionalism	Nonmarket/closed economy (home bias vs. foreign bias); Lack of membership in international organizations; Weak institutions, corruption	Landlockedness; Lack of internal navigability; Geographic size; Geographic remoteness; Weak transportation or communication links	Economic size; Low per capita income

== Practical Use ==
Ghemawat offers some advice on how the CAGE Framework can help managers considering international strategies:

- It makes distance visible for managers.
- It helps to pinpoint the differences across countries that might handicap multinational companies relative to local competitors.
- It can shed light on the relative position of multinationals from different countries. For example, it can help explain the strength of Spanish firms in many industries across Latin America.
- It can be used to compare markets from the perspective of a particular company. One method to conduct quantitative analysis of this type is to discount (specifically, divide) raw measures of market size or potential with measures of distance, broadly defined.

Ghemawat emphasizes that different types of distance matter to different extents depending on the industry. Because geographic distance, for instance, affects the costs of transportation, it is of particular importance to companies dealing in heavy or bulky products. Cultural distance, on the other hand, affects consumers’ product preferences. It should be a crucial consideration for a consumer goods or media company, but it is much less important for a cement or steel business.

To facilitate quantitative analysis based on the CAGE framework, Prof. Ghemawat has developed an online tool called the CAGE Comparator. The CAGE Comparator covers 163 home countries and 65 industries, and allows users to customize the impacts of 16 types of CAGE distance.

Professor Ghemawat recommends using the CAGE framework together with the ADDING Value Scorecard and the AAA Strategies.
