= Wandel durch Handel =

German political and economic term

Wandel durch Handel (WdH, German for "change through trade"), also known as Wandel durch Annäherung, is a political and economic notion, mostly associated with German foreign policy, of increasing trade with authoritarian regimes in an effort to induce political change. Although most strongly associated with Germany, similar policies have been pursued by several Western countries.

After being a central tenet in German, and European Union, politics since the 1970s, the policy came under intense scrutiny following the 2022 Russian invasion of Ukraine. In April 2022, European Commissioner for Economy Paolo Gentiloni stated that "[t]he notion of 'Wandel durch Handel', of bringing about change through trade, has shown its limitations", saying that "[w]e need to rethink our relations with autocratic regimes and strengthen our ties with like-minded partners". Similarly, European Trade Commissioner Valdis Dombrovskis stated four days into the Russian invasion that "[t]he weaponization of trade shows no signs of abating. We have no choice but to face up to this reality, and adapt."

== Background ==
A perceived connection between trade and conflict-avoidance has been noted a long time, with some tracing it back to writing from Ancient Greece. Enlightenment philosopher Montesquieu is often credited with creating the concept of doux commerce, theorizing that trade had a tendency to civilize. The idea is that with trade will come dialogue, and that interdependence makes conflict less likely. Montesquieu wrote "wherever the ways of man are gentle, there is commerce; and wherever there is commerce, there the ways of men are gentle" and that "[t]he natural effect of commerce is to lead to peace".

Despite the connection to Montesquieu, the idea has been traced to earlier workings, like those of Michel de Montaigne. The idea was prevalent among some Enlightenment philosophers, like Thomas Paine, who argued that "[i]f commerce were permitted to act to the universal extent it is capable, it would extirpate the system of war". Other associated philosophers are Voltaire, Smith, and Hume, as well as Immanuel Kant. Despite not using the term himself, Montesquieu remains most associated with the doux commerce philosophy.

== History ==
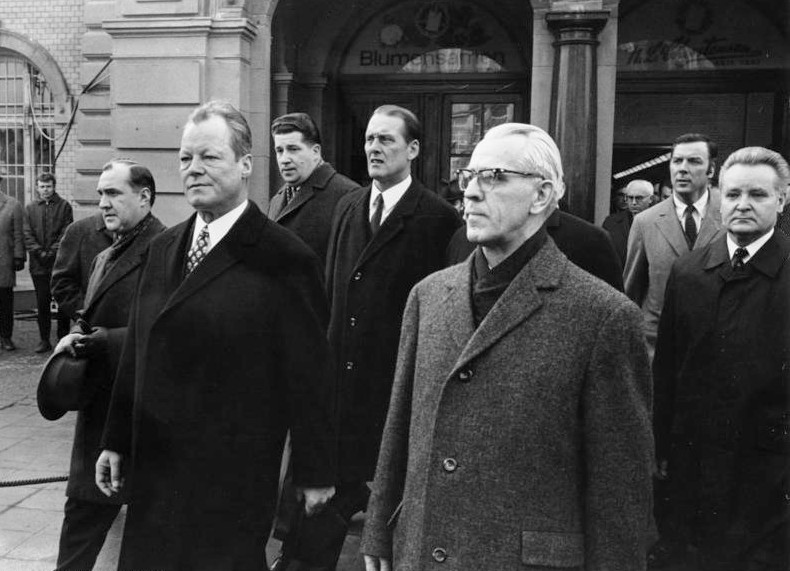
Willy Brandt (left) and Willi Stoph in Erfurt 1970, the first encounter of a Federal Chancellor with his East German counterpart, an early step in the de-escalation of the Cold War

The policy of Wandel durch Annäherung (English: "change through rapprochement") was first formulated in 1963 in a speech by Egon Bahr before the Evangelischen Akademie Tutzing.

The policy started in the early 1970s, directed towards the German Democratic Republic and the other communist dictatorships of Eastern Europe, as part of Ostpolitik. Started under the first Social Democratic chancellor of postwar West Germany, Willy Brandt, WdH became a "defining pillar" of successive Social Democratic administrations, culminating under the 1998-2005 reign of Chancellor Gerhard Schröder. The WdH philosophy was embraced by a succession of chancellors and politicians, as well as and supported or lobbied for by industry leaders, labor unions and journalists.

In 2007, then-Minister of Foreign Affairs Frank-Walter Steinmeier published a long article explaining his rationale on EU being such a exceptional role model on international cooperation that Russia will unavoidably get "like us" by merely "intertwining of interests" (Verflechtung), and also that "a pan-European peace order and a lasting solution to important security problems (…) can only be achieved with Russia, not without it or even against it". Steinmeier helped in 2011 to admit Russia into the WTO.

According to Steven Blockmans of the Centre for European Policy Studies, WdH was a viable policy after the fall of the Berlin Wall, when the European Union had both the economic and soft power to aid democratization. According to Blockmans, however, this came to an end with the 2008 financial crisis, making WdH a "fig leaf" to maintain commercial relations with authoritarian states.

Angela Merkel, Gerhard Schröder's successor as chancellor, and her governments have been closely associated with the WdH policy; in fact she resurrected the career of Foreign Minister Steinmeier from 2013 to 2017, whereupon he left for the presidency. She came under criticism of putting business interests above speaking out against China's human rights abuses.

By 2020 several critics like Andreas Fulda, Senior Fellow at the University of Nottingham, believed WdH had run its course. Despite this, German Minister of Finance Peter Altmaier stated "I have always been convinced and I still believe that change can be achieved through trade". The criticism however grew exponentially after the 2022 Russian invasion of Ukraine.

=== Russian invasion of Ukraine ===
The concept came under renewed scrutiny in the wake of the Russian invasion of Ukraine. Due to decades of pursuing close economic ties with Russia, and deepening dependence on gas, coal and oil, Germany and other states struggled to break economic ties to prevent indirectly financing the war. Due to German energy dependence on Russia, Germany was the last EU country to oppose strong economic sanctions on Russia in the wake of invasion.

In a speech following the invasion, German Chancellor Olaf Scholz declared a break with past policies, calling it a Zeitenwende. Due to the Russian invasion, German politicians have abandoned the policy of WdH. Former Bundeswehr general Hans-Lothar Domröse called WdH "refuted". Wolfgang Kubicki stated that "50 years of my political agenda have vanished into thin air". Rolf Mützenich, SPD parliamentary leader, stated that "Europe urgently needs to define a common economic foreign policy ... with the war in Ukraine and the aftermath, it will probably no longer be about change through trade [Wandel durch Handel]. It's probably all about stability through trade [Stabilität durch Handel]".

The Russian invasion caused shockwaves in German politics, leading to large introspection of former policies. Although all parties came under criticism, the SPD came under especially pronounced criticism for its perceived naivete. Die Welt described Merkel's "trade-based diplomacy" as an "error", writing "what Germany and Europe have experienced over the last days is nothing short of a reversal of Merkel's policies of guaranteeing peace and freedom through treaties with despots". According to Thomas Kleine-Brockhoff, vice-president of the German Marshall Fund, "Germany believed that trade would be a peacemaker, that interconnectedness would prevent us from going to war with each other [...] There was a belief that trading with Russia – notably with what it does best, namely oil and gas – was a strategy for peace. But that strategy has failed."

Internationally, the policy also came under strong criticism. In an article on those "most to blame for Germany’s misguided approach", Politico wrote that "[r]arely has a country’s confidence about itself and its place in the world been so thoroughly pulverized overnight", holding the entire country complicit in selling its "soul" to Russia. Since the war, politicians like Angela Merkel's policies have come under scrutiny both domestically and abroad, particularly the green-lighting of Nord Stream 2 even after the 2014 annexation of Crimea and the start of the war in Donbas. Similarly, those of President Frank-Walter Steinmeier and former Chancellor Gerhard Schröder, as well as other German business leaders and administration officials, have come under strong criticism. Steinmeier had, according to Christoph Heusgen, Angela Merkel's chief foreign policy advisor until 2017, been the main supporter in the Merkel government of Schröder's Nord Stream 2 push, together with Sigmar Gabriel. On 12 April 2022, Steinmeier was denied a visit to the Ukrainian government in Kyiv, based on his former policies and ties with Schröder. Joe Kaeser, of Siemens, described as the one pushing hardest for deepening ties by Politico, also apologized for previous remarks, stating "I was among those who believed in the principle of Wandel durch Handel". In May 2022 Steinmeier described his past policy towards Russia as "failure on many points", caused in part by long-term culture of ignoring warnings from Eastern European countries, especially after 2014.

In a criticism of the WdH policy, British Foreign Secretary Liz Truss stated that instead of bringing about democratization in Russia, Putin "took the money from oil and gas and used it to consolidate power and gain leverage abroad", stating also that "Wandel durch Handel – the assumption that economic integration drives political change – didn't work". According to Vasyl Cherepanyn of the Visual Culture Research Center in Kyiv, WdH "has simply been a maskirovka, a deception that has allowed German corporations to maintain ties with their Russian oligarch counterparts all this time". Similarly, philanthropist and economist George Soros strongly criticized the policies of former Chancellor Merkel at the 2022 World Economic Forum, blaming her "special deals" with Moscow for making Europe dependent on Russian gas, as well as criticizing her for making "China Germany's largest export market".

On 7 June 2022, Merkel made her first public interview since leaving office the preceding year. Merkel claimed she had "at no time given in to illusions" that the WdH policy would lead to actual change in Putin's authoritarian behavior, stating she "was not naive" in her policies. She also claimed she had repeatedly warned allies that Putin wanted "to destroy the EU because he sees it as a precursor to NATO". She gave no explanation as to her misunderstanding of the directionality of time nor how she saw this being compatible with deepening dependence on Russian gas, only saying she considered it proper to have "at least some trade relations".

On 25 October 2022 Steinmeier was allowed to visit Kyiv where he had a rapprochement with Zelenskyy. Polish professor of international affairs Sławomir Dębski stated that WdH policy "did not change Russia, but it did change Germany" but mainstreaming the "business model based on the interconnections of business, politics, secret services and the criminal world".

== See also ==
- Putinversteher
