= Hot, Flat, and Crowded =

2008 English-language book by Thomas Friedman

- 2008 hardcover version cover
- Author: Thomas Friedman
- Language: English
- Subject: Global warming, sustainable energy
- Genre: Non-fiction
- Publisher: Farrar, Straus and Giroux
- Publication date: September 8, 2008
- Publication place: United States
- Media type: Print, e-book
- Pages: 448 pp.
- ISBN: 978-0312428921
- Preceded by: The World Is Flat
- Followed by: That Used To Be Us

Hot, Flat, and Crowded: Why We Need a Green Revolution—And How It Can Renew America is a book by New York Times Foreign Affairs columnist Thomas Friedman, proposing that the solutions to global warming and the best method to regain the United States' economic and political stature in the world are to embrace the sustainable energy and green technology industries. The title derives from the convergence of Hot (global warming), Flat (globalization, as discussed in Friedman's book The World Is Flat) and Crowded (population growth).

The book was released on September 8, 2008, by Farrar, Straus and Giroux. The audiobook was released simultaneously by Macmillan Audio. The cover art is taken from Hieronymus Bosch's The Garden of Earthly Delights.

A second edition of the book was published in November 2009.

== Summary ==
In the book, Friedman addresses what he sees as America's loss of focus and national purpose since 9/11 and the global environmental crisis. He advocates that global warming, rapidly growing populations, and the expansion of the global middle class are leading to a convergence of hot, flat, and crowded. He argues that the solution to the environmental threat and the best way for America to renew its purpose are linked: take the lead in a worldwide effort to replace wasteful, inefficient energy practices with a strategy for sustainable energy, energy efficiency, and conservation. This means that the big economic opportunities have shifted from IT (Information Technology) in recent decades to ET (renewable Environmental Technologies). Friedman frequently uses 2050 as a marker for when it will be too late for our world to reverse the harmful effects of climate change.

Friedman writes that the needed green revolution of the title would be more ambitious than any project so far undertaken: It will be the biggest innovation project in American history; and it will change everything from transportation to the utilities industry. This project is described in terms of nation-building.

The book alleges we've gone from the "Cold War Era" to the "Energy-Climate Era", marked by five major problems: growing demand for scarcer supplies, massive transfer of wealth to dictators, disruptive climate change, the lower class falling behind, and an accelerating loss of biodiversity. He argues that a green strategy is not simply about generating electric power, it is a new way of generating national power.

Many of the primary points of the book were built out of Friedman's New York Times Magazine essay, "The Power of Green", and the Foreign Policy article, "The First Law of Petropolitics".

The book has been criticized for ignoring overpopulation as the root cause of the problems it analyzes, as Friedman writes extensively about resource scarcity, but does not address excessive demand.

== Editions ==
- 1st edition, Farrar, Straus and Giroux, 2008, ISBN 978-0-374-16685-4
- Unabridged Audio book, Macmillan Audio, 2008, ISBN 978-1-4272-0458-5
- Abridged Audio book, Macmillan Audio, 2008, ISBN 978-1-4272-0460-8
- Release 2.0 Updated and Expanded November 2009.

== See also ==
- An Inconvenient Truth
- Collapse
- Green New Deal
- Merchants of Doubt
- Requiem for a Species
- Storms of my Grandchildren
- What's the Worst That Could Happen?: A Rational Response to the Climate Change Debate
- Why We Disagree About Climate Change
