= Michael Mousseau =

Michael James Mousseau (born 1964) is a political scientist whose research and teaching is focused on international relations and comparative politics, in particular the link between economic conditions, institutions, and conflict. He is the creator of economic norms theory, which identifies how sustained and equal opportunity in a market can create popular interests in liberal democracy, and peace within and between nations. He advocates that wealthy countries make aggressive efforts towards bringing widespread economic opportunity to lesser developed countries, which he argues would result in a just and permanent global peace.

== Biography ==
Michael Mousseau received his Ph.D. from Binghamton University in 1998, after years of ethnographic research in many regions that included the Middle East (1984), Central America (1985 and 1987), the Soviet Union (1991), East Africa (1991), the Indian sub-continent (1992), and China (1992). He joined Koç University in 1998, where he remained for fifteen years at the rank of full professor. He has been a Research Fellow at the Belfer Center International Security Program, Harvard University (2005–2006), and the United Nations Studies Program, Yale University (2003). He currently teaches at the University of Central Florida.

== Economic norms theory ==
Economic norms theory links the economic conditions of clientelism, which prevail in many lower income societies, and contract-intensive economy, which prevails in many higher income societies, with divergent political interests and habits. A contract-intensive economy is one where goods, services, and labor are highly commodified: most individuals obtain livable incomes, goods and services through interacting with strangers in a market where the state makes an active effort to ensure widespread availability of opportunities. In contract-poor societies, on the other hand, most individuals are economically dependent for their needs on social ties such as family, clans and religious/ethnic groups. The prevalent mode of transaction is reciprocal exchange where favors are returned (or withheld) in the light of prior interactions, usually among small in-groups. Thus, individuals have little need for reliably impartial states but have a strong interest in the welfare of their in-groups.

Economic norms theory identifies a number of divergent interests that emerge from these divergent economic conditions. In contract-intensive societies individuals have an interest in all strangers having freedom of choice and being protected by reliably-impartial states – features that are essential for the proper functioning of an impersonal market. As a consequence, individuals in these societies prefer that their states enforce contracts reliably and impartially, protect individual rights, and make efforts to enhance the general welfare. Moreover, with the assumption of bounded rationality, individuals routinely dependent on trusting strangers in contract will develop the habits of trusting strangers and preferring universal rights, impartial law, and liberal democratic government. In contrast, individuals in contract-poor societies will develop the habits of abiding by the commands of group leaders, and distrusting those from out-groups. To the extent that control of the state can affect the welfare of groups, groups have an interest in seeking control of the state in order to distribute state rents in ways that favor themselves and help to maintain power. As a consequence, contract-poor societies often lack stable and liberal democracy, and are often plagued with extensive rent seeking, corruption, and weak rule of law.

According to economic norms theory, the people in contract-rich nations enjoy a permanent and positive peace. As long as their states accede to popular demands and remain reliably impartial, individuals in nations with contract intensive economies have an interest in everyone’s rights and material welfare, within and outside the nation. Consequently, contract-intensive nations not only avoid war with each other but engage in intense levels of mutual cooperation specifically aimed at promoting each other's material welfare. Leaders of nations with contract-poor economies, in contrast, pursue the interests of their dominant groups and have no interest in the security or welfare of members of out-groups, whether they are internal or external to the nation.

A policy implication of the economic norms theory is that contract-intensive democracies should enact policies that will promote full employment across the globe. If the vast majority of individuals in contract-poor societies could find jobs on the market they would opt out of their dependence on group leaders. They would then have interests in reliably impartial government and in the rights and welfare of strangers, making peace within and between all nations possible.

== Selected bibliography ==
- "The End of War: How a Robust Marketplace and Liberal Hegemony Are Leading to Perpetual World Peace," International Security, Vol. 44, No. 1 (Summer 2019), 160-196
- "The Social Market Roots of Democratic Peace," International Security, Vol. 33, No. 4 (Spring 2009), 52-86
- "The Contracting Roots of Human Rights," (with Demet Yalcin Mousseau) Journal of Peace Research, Vol. 45, No. 3 (May 2008), 327-344
- "The Nexus of Market Society, Liberal Preferences and Democratic Peace: Interdisciplinary Theory and Evidence," International Studies Quarterly, Vol. 47, No. 4 (December 2003), 483-510
- "Market Civilization and its Clash with Terror," International Security, Vol. 27, No. 3 (Winter 2002-2003), 5-29

== Sources ==
- Michael Mousseau's official homepage at the University of Central Florida
