= The World Is Flat =

2005 English-language book by Thomas Friedman

The World Is Flat: A Brief History of the Twenty-first Century
- Original 1st edition cover
- Author: Thomas Friedman
- Cover artist: I Told You So, by E.D. Miracle; 1976.
- Language: English
- Subject: Globalization
- Publisher: Farrar, Straus and Giroux
- Publication date: April 5, 2005
- Publication place: United States
- Media type: Print (hardcover and paperback) and audio-CD
- Pages: 488
- ISBN: 0-374-29288-4
- OCLC: 57202171
- Dewey Decimal: 330.90511 22
- LC Class: HM846 .F74 2005
- Preceded by: Longitudes and Attitudes
- Followed by: Hot, Flat, and Crowded

The World Is Flat: A Brief History of the Twenty-First Century is a 2005 book by American political commentator Thomas L. Friedman. It analyzes globalization in the early 21st century, suggesting that the world has a level playing field where countries, companies, and individuals need to remain competitive in a global market. It won the inaugural Financial Times and Goldman Sachs Business Book of the Year Award in 2005.

== Summary ==
In The World Is Flat, Friedman recounts a journey to Bangalore, India, when he realized that globalization had changed core economic concepts. In his opinion, this flattening is a product of the convergence of the personal computer with fiber optic microcables and the rise of workflow software. Friedman termed the period Globalization 3.0, thereby differentiating it from the previous, Globalization 1.0, during which countries and governments were the main protagonists, and Globalization 2.0, during which multinational companies led the way in driving global integration.

Friedman recounts examples of companies based in India and China that "according to him," by providing labor ranging from that of typists and call center operators to accountants and computer programmers, have become integral parts of complex global supply chains; such companies include Dell, AOL, and Microsoft. Friedman's capitalist peace theory called Dell Theory of Conflict Prevention is discussed in the book's penultimate chapter.

=== Ten flatteners ===
Friedman defines ten "flatteners" which he sees as leveling the global playing field:

1. Collapse of the Berlin Wall – 11/9/89: Friedman called the flattener "When the walls came down, and the windows came up". The event not only symbolized the end of the Cold War but also allowed people from the other side of the wall to join the economic mainstream. "11/9/89" is a discussion about the Berlin Wall's coming down, the "fall" of communism, and the impact that Windows-powered PCs (personal computers) had on the ability of individuals to create their own content and connect to one another. At that point, the basic platform for the revolution to follow was created: the IBM PC, Windows, a graphical interface for word processing, dial-up modems, a standardized tool for communication, and a global phone network.
2. Netscape – 8/9/95: Netscape went public at the price of $28. Netscape and the Web broadened the audience for the Internet from its roots as a communications medium used primarily by "early adopters and geeks" to something that made the Internet accessible to everyone from five-year-olds to ninety-five-year-olds. The digitization that took place meant that everyday occurrences such as words, files, films, music, and pictures could be accessed and manipulated on a computer screen by all people across the world.
3. Workflow software: This is Friedman's catch-all for the standards and technologies that allowed work to flow. It is the ability of machines to talk to other machines with no humans involved. Friedman believes the first three forces have become a "crude foundation of a whole new global platform for collaboration". This is complemented by the emergence of software protocols (SMTP – simple mail transfer protocol, and HTML – the language that enabled anyone to design and publish documents that could be transmitted to and read on any computer anywhere). The emergence of such software is the "Genesis moment of the flat world" and means "that people can work with other people on more stuff than ever before". This created a global platform for multiple forms of collaboration, on which the next six flatteners depend.
4. Uploading: Uploading involves communities that upload and collaborate on online projects. Examples are open source software, blogs, and Wikipedia. Friedman considers the phenomenon "the most disruptive force of all" and also talks about how this gives individuals the possibility to replace news and the traditional music industry, because of individuals possibility of blogging and podcasting.
5. Outsourcing: Friedman argues that outsourcing has enabled companies to split service and manufacturing activities into components that can be subcontracted and performed in the most efficient, most cost-effective way. This process became easier with the mass distribution of fiber-optic cable during the introduction of the World Wide Web.
6. Offshoring: This is the internal relocation of a company's manufacturing or other processes to a foreign land to take advantage of less costly operations there. China's entrance into the World Trade Organization allowed for greater competition on the playing field. Now such countries as Malaysia, Mexico, and Brazil must compete against China and one another to have businesses offshore to them.
7. Supply-chaining: Friedman compares the modern retail supply chain to a river and describes Wal-Mart as the best example of a company that uses technology to streamline item sales, distribution, and shipping.
8. Insourcing: Friedman uses UPS as a prime example for insourcing, whereby the company's employees perform services – beyond shipping – for another company. For example, UPS repairs Toshiba computers on behalf of Toshiba. The work is done at the UPS hub by UPS employees.
9. Informing: Google and other search engines and Wikipedia are the prime examples. "Never before in the history of the planet have so many people – on their own – had the ability to find so much information about so many things and about so many other people", writes Friedman. He states that the growth of search engines is tremendous; for example, Friedman states, Google is "now processing roughly one billion searches per day, up from 150 million just three years ago".
10. "The Steroids": The steroids are wireless, Voice over IP (VoIP), and file sharing, and are used on personal digital devices like mobile phones, iPods, and personal digital assistants; on instant messaging; and on VoIP phones. Digital, mobile, personal, and virtual as well as all analog content and processes (from entertainment to photography, to word processing) can be digitized and therefore shaped, manipulated, and transmitted; and these processes can be done at high speed with total ease; mobile can be done anywhere and anytime by anyone, and can be done to anyone.

=== Proposed remedies ===
Friedman believes that to fight the quiet crisis of a flattening world, the US workforce should keep updating its work skills. Making the workforce more adaptable, Friedman argues, will keep it more employable. He also suggests that the government make it easier for people to switch jobs by making retirement benefits and health insurance less dependent on one's employer and by providing insurance that would partly cover a possible drop in income when changing jobs. Friedman also believes there should be more inspiration for youth to become scientists, engineers, and mathematicians because of a decrease in the percentage of those professionals who are American.

=== Dell Theory of Conflict Prevention ===
The Dell Theory of Conflict Prevention, also known as simply the Dell Theory, is a capitalist peace theory and an updated version of Friedman's previous "Golden Arches Theory of Conflict Prevention". According to Friedman:

The Dell Theory stipulates: No two countries that are both part of a major global supply chain, like Dell's, will ever fight a war against each other as long as they are both part of the same global supply chain.

That is, as long as corporations have major supply chain operations in countries other than that corporation's home country, those countries will never engage in armed conflicts. This is because of the economic interdependence between nations that arises when a large corporation (such as Dell) has supply chain operations in multiple global locations and when developing nations (in which supply chain operations commonly take place) are reluctant to give up their newfound wealth.

In his previous book The Lexus and the Olive Tree, Friedman argued that no two nations with a McDonald's franchise had ever gone to war with one another; this was known as the Golden Arches theory. Later, Friedman upgraded that theory into the "Dell Theory of Conflict Prevention" by saying that people or nations do not just want to have a better standard of living as symbolized by a McDonald's franchise in their downtown but also want to have that lump of the labor sector that is created by globalization. That is, developing nations do not want to risk the trust of the multinational companies that venture into their markets and include them in the global supply chain.

Thomas Friedman also warns that the Dell theory should not be interpreted as a guarantee that nations that are deeply involved in global supply chains will not go to war with each other. It means, rather, that the governments of those nations and their citizens will have very heavy economic costs to consider as they contemplate the possibility of war. Such costs include long-term loss of the country's profitable participation in the global supply chain.

This theory relates with how conflict prevention occurred between India and Pakistan in their 2001–2002 nuclear standoff, wherein India was at risk of losing its global partners. The relationship between the People's Republic of China and Taiwan was also cited as an example of that theory: both countries have strong supply relations with each other.

== Critical reception ==
The World Is Flat received generally favorable reviews.The Washington Post called the book an "engrossing tour" and an "enthralling read".

An opposing viewpoint was found in a 2007 Foreign Policy magazine article in which economist Pankaj Ghemawat argued that 90% of the world's phone calls, Web traffic, and investments are local, suggesting that Friedman has grossly exaggerated the significance of the trends he describes: "Despite talk of a new, wired world where information, ideas, money, and people can move around the planet faster than ever before, just a fraction of what we consider globalization actually exists."

Some critics have pointed out that the book is written from an American perspective. Friedman's work history has been mostly with The New York Times, and that may have influenced the way the book was written – some would have preferred a book written in a more "inclusive voice".

Nobel Prize-winning economist Joseph Stiglitz has been critical of Friedman's book:

Friedman is right that there have been dramatic changes in the global economy, in the global landscape; in some directions, the world is much flatter than it has ever been, with those in various parts of the world being more connected than they have ever been, but the world is not flat ... Not only is the world not flat: in many ways, it has been getting less flat.

— Joseph E. Stiglitz (2007): Making Globalization Work. pp. 56–57

Richard Florida expresses similar views in his 2005 Atlantic article "The World Is Spiky".

John Gray, formerly a School Professor of European Thought at the London School of Economics and Political Science, wrote another critical review of Friedman's book called "The World Is Round". In it, Gray confirms Friedman's assertion that globalization is making the world more interconnected and, in some parts, richer but disputes the notion that globalization makes the world more peaceful or freer. Gray also declares, "least of all does it make it flat".

Geographers on the whole have been particularly critical of Friedman's writings, views influenced by the large body of work within their field demonstrating the uneven nature of globalization, the strong influence place still has on people's lives, and the dependent relationships that have been established between the have and have-not regions in the current world-system. Geographer Harm de Blij detailed those arguments for the general public in Why Geography Matters: Three Challenges Facing America (2005), The Power of Place: Geography, Destiny, and Globalization's Rough Landscape (2008), and Why Geography Matters More Than Ever (2012).

== Editions ==
- The World is Flat (1st ed.). Farrar, Straus and Giroux. 2005. ISBN 0-374-29288-4.. The original jacket illustration, reproducing the painting I Told You So by Ed Miracle, depicting a sailing ship falling off the edge of the world, was changed during the print run due to copyright issues. These issues were settled in March 2006.
- The World is Flat (Audiobook ed.). Audio Renaissance. 2005. ISBN 1-59397-668-2.
- The World is Flat: Updated and Expanded (Release 2.0) (2nd ed.). Farrar, Straus and Giroux. 2006. ISBN 0-374-29279-5.
- The World is Flat: Further Updated and Expanded (Release 3.0) (2nd revised and expanded ed.). Farrar, Straus and Giroux. 2007. ISBN 978-0-374-29278-2.

== See also ==
- Flat Classroom Project
- The World Is Curved
