= Longitudes and Attitudes =

2002 English-language book by Thomas Friedman

- First edition
- Author: Thomas Friedman
- Language: English
- Genre: Non-fiction
- Publisher: Farrar Straus & Giroux
- Publication date: 2002
- Publication place: United States
- Pages: 400

Longitudes and Attitudes: Exploring the World After September 11 (reprinted as Longitudes and Attitudes: The World in the Age of Terrorism in 2003) is the third book by New York Times columnist Thomas Friedman. Firstly published in September 2002, it consists of articles relating to 9/11 and a brief journal of Friedman's experience around that time.
