= Thomas L. Friedman =

American journalist and author (born 1953)

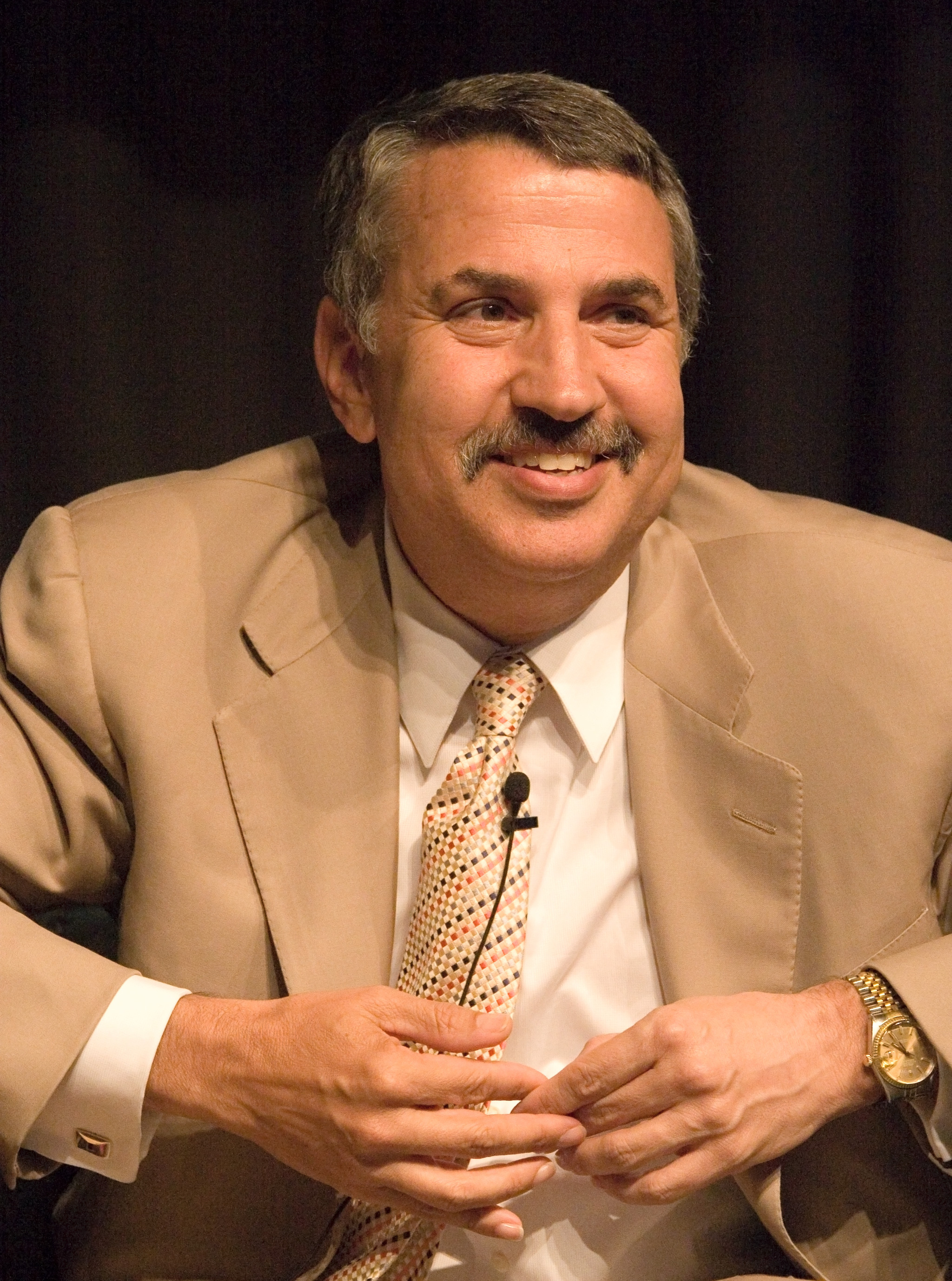
- Friedman in 2005
- Born: Thomas Loren Friedman; July 20, 1953 (age 73); Minneapolis, Minnesota, U.S.
- Education: Brandeis University (BA); St Antony's College, Oxford (MPhil)
- Occupations: Author, columnist
- Spouse: Ann Bucksbaum
- Children: 2
- Relatives: Matthew Bucksbaum (father-in-law)
- Website: www.thomaslfriedman.com

Thomas Loren Friedman (/ˈfriːdmən/ FREED-mən; born July 20, 1953) is an American political commentator and author. He is a three-time Pulitzer Prize winner and a weekly columnist for The New York Times. He has written extensively on foreign affairs, global trade, the Middle East, globalization, and environmental issues.

Friedman began his career as a reporter and won two Pulitzer Prizes in the 1980s for his coverage on conflict in Lebanon and politics in Israel, followed by a further prize in 2002 for commentary on the war on terror.

== Early life and education ==
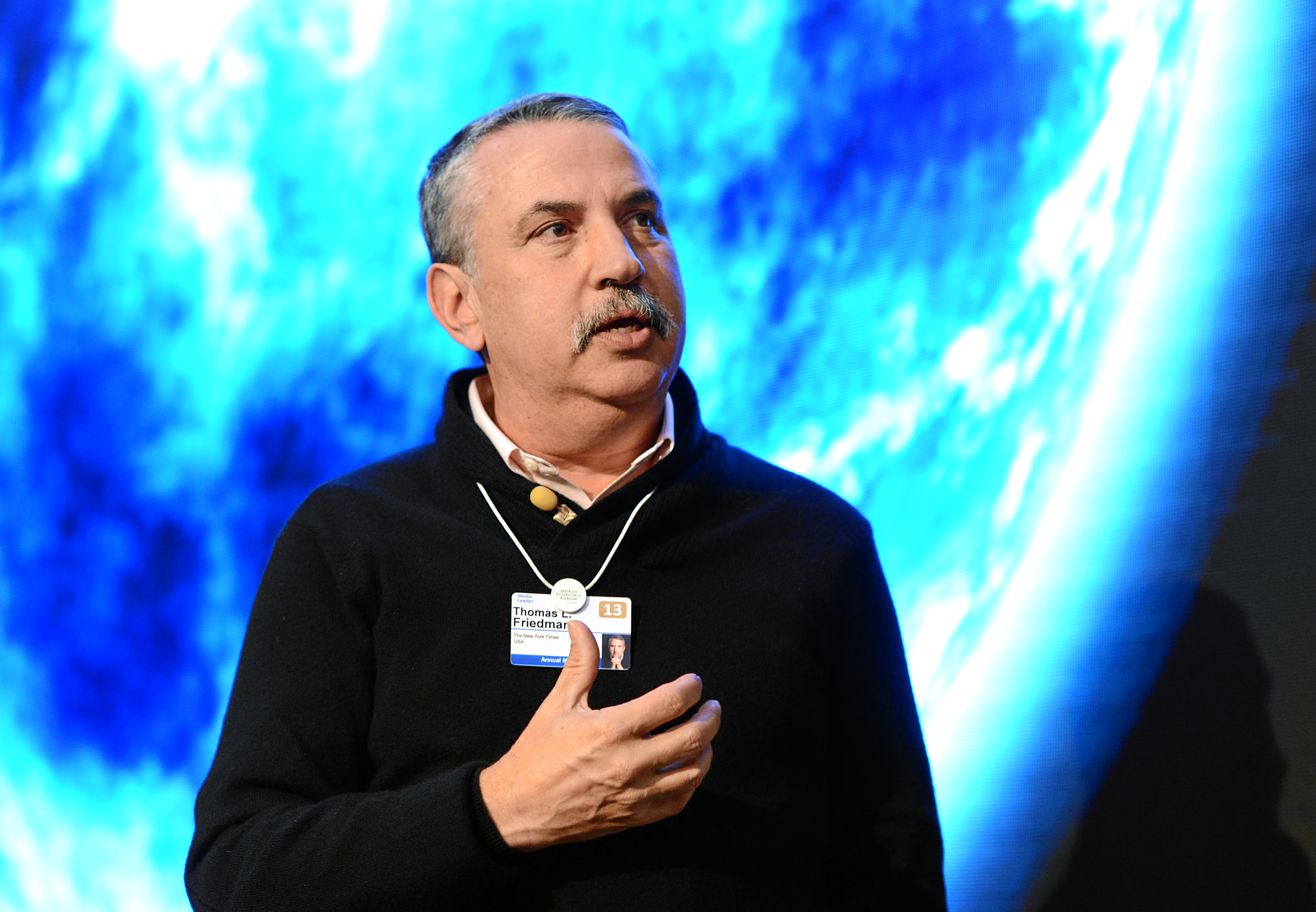
Friedman during the WEF 2013

Friedman was born on July 20, 1953, in Minneapolis, Minnesota, the son of Margaret and Harold Friedman. Harold, who was vice president of a ball bearing company, United Bearing, died of a heart attack in 1973 when Tom was nineteen years old. Margaret, who served in the United States Navy during World War II and studied Home Economics at the University of Wisconsin, was a homemaker and a part-time bookkeeper. Margaret was also a Silver Life Master duplicate bridge player, who died in 2008. Friedman has two older sisters, Shelley and Jane. From an early age, Friedman, whose father often took him to the golf course for a round after work, wanted to be a professional golfer. He played a lot of sports, and became serious about tennis and golf. He caddied at a local country club and in 1970 caddied for professional golfer Chi Chi Rodriguez when the US Open came to town.

Friedman is Jewish. He attended Hebrew school five days a week until his Bar Mitzvah, then St. Louis Park High School, where he wrote articles for his school's newspaper. He became enamored with Israel after a visit there in December 1968, and he spent all three of his high school summers living on Kibbutz HaHotrim, near Haifa. He has characterized his high school years as "one big celebration of Israel's victory in the Six-Day War".

Friedman attended the University of Minnesota for two years before transferring to Brandeis University and graduated summa cum laude in 1975 with a degree in Mediterranean studies. Friedman also pursued Arabic studies at The American University in Cairo, where he graduated in 1974 from its Arabic language unit (ALU). After graduating from Brandeis, he attended St Antony's College at the University of Oxford as a Marshall Scholar, earning an M.Phil. in Middle Eastern studies.

== Journalism career ==
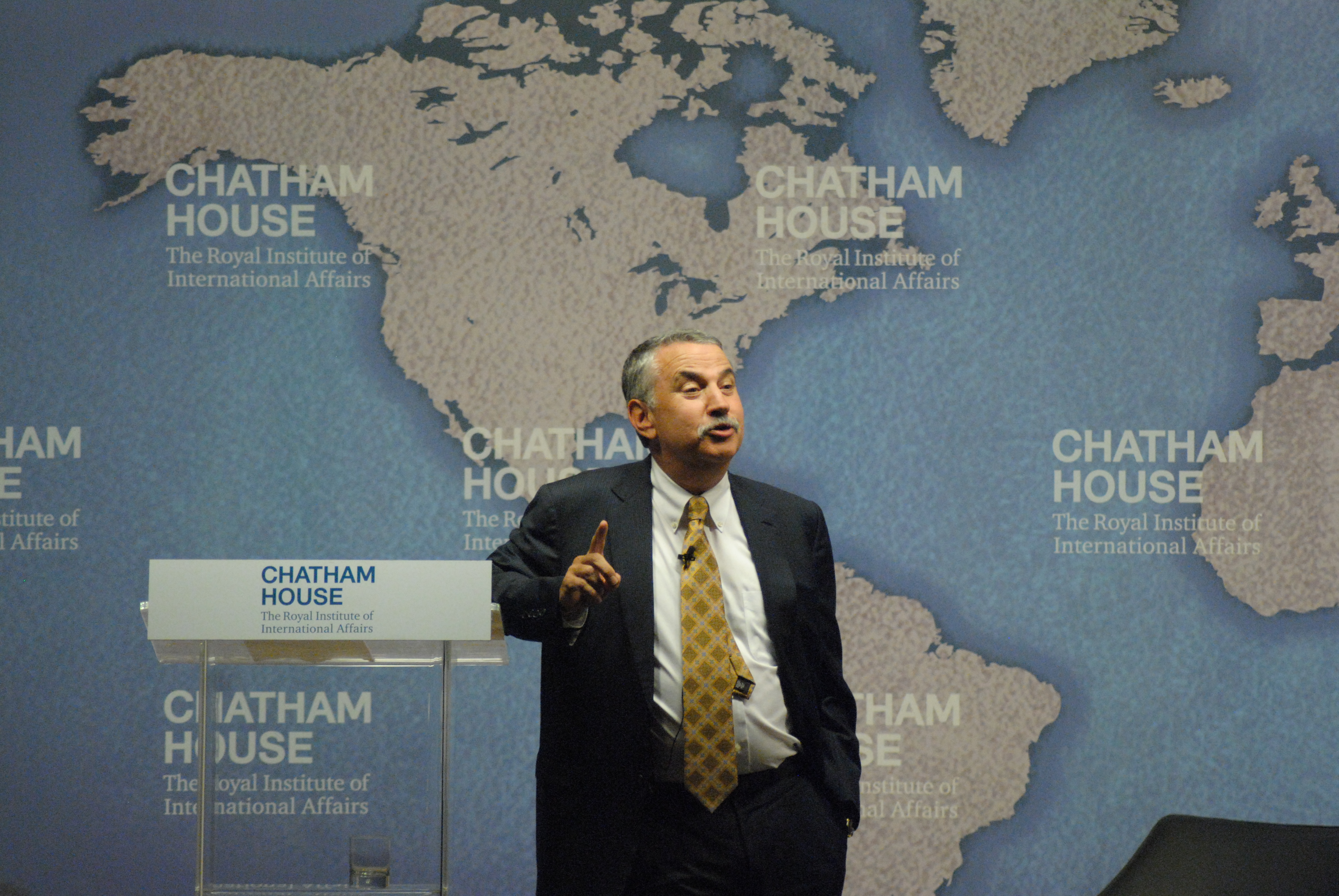
Friedman speaking at Chatham House in London in September 2014

Friedman joined the London bureau of United Press International after completing his master's degree. He was dispatched a year later to Beirut, where he lived from June 1979 to May 1981 while covering the Lebanon Civil War. He was hired by The New York Times as a reporter in 1981 and re-dispatched to Beirut at the start of the 1982 Israeli invasion of Lebanon. His coverage of the war, particularly the Sabra and Shatila massacre, won him the Pulitzer Prize for International Reporting (shared with Loren Jenkins of The Washington Post). Alongside David K. Shipler, he also won the George Polk Award for foreign reporting.

In June 1984, Friedman was transferred to Jerusalem, where he served as the New York Times Jerusalem Bureau Chief until February 1988. That year he received a second Pulitzer Prize for International Reporting, which cited his coverage of the First Palestinian Intifada. He wrote a book, From Beirut to Jerusalem, describing his experiences in the Middle East, which won the 1989 U.S. National Book Award for Nonfiction.

Friedman covered Secretary of State James Baker during the administration of President George H. W. Bush. Following the election of Bill Clinton in 1992, Friedman became the White House correspondent for The New York Times. In 1994, he began to write more about foreign policy and economics and moved to the op-ed page of The New York Times the following year as a foreign affairs columnist. In 2002, Friedman won the Pulitzer Prize for Commentary for his "clarity of vision, based on extensive reporting, in commenting on the worldwide impact of the terrorist threat".

In February 2002, Friedman met Saudi Crown Prince Abdullah and encouraged him to make a comprehensive attempt to end the Arab–Israeli conflict by normalizing Arab relations with Israel in exchange for the return of refugees alongside an end to the Israel territorial occupations. Abdullah proposed the Arab Peace Initiative at the Beirut Summit that March, which Friedman has since strongly supported.

Friedman received the 2004 Overseas Press Club Award for lifetime achievement and the same year was named to the Order of the British Empire by Queen Elizabeth II. In May 2011, The New York Times reported that President Barack Obama "has sounded out" Friedman concerning Middle East issues.

== Views ==
External videos
- In Depth interview with Friedman, May 1, 2005, C-SPAN

Friedman has been criticized for his staunch advocacy of the Iraq War, as well as unregulated trade, and his early support of Saudi Royal Prince Mohammed bin Salman.

=== Aadhaar ===
Friedman has publicly expressed his support for the biometrics based Unique Identification program of India. When asked about the privacy concerns raised by the UID program in India he said:

I am a huge enthusiast of the UID platform. I feel that is going to be a platform for innovation. Societies require these platforms where people are integrated with a trusted ID. I think concerns about privacy are bogus. The platform doesn't store anything about you except your biometrics. It's not tracking you. Facebook is tracking you much more today. If you are worried about privacy, then you shouldn't be using Google, Facebook, Twitter, any of these things. They are tracking you so much more than the Indian government is tracking you. What's worse is that they are selling it [information about you] for profit. So, I think the privacy concern [around Aadhaar] is bogus.

=== Globalization ===
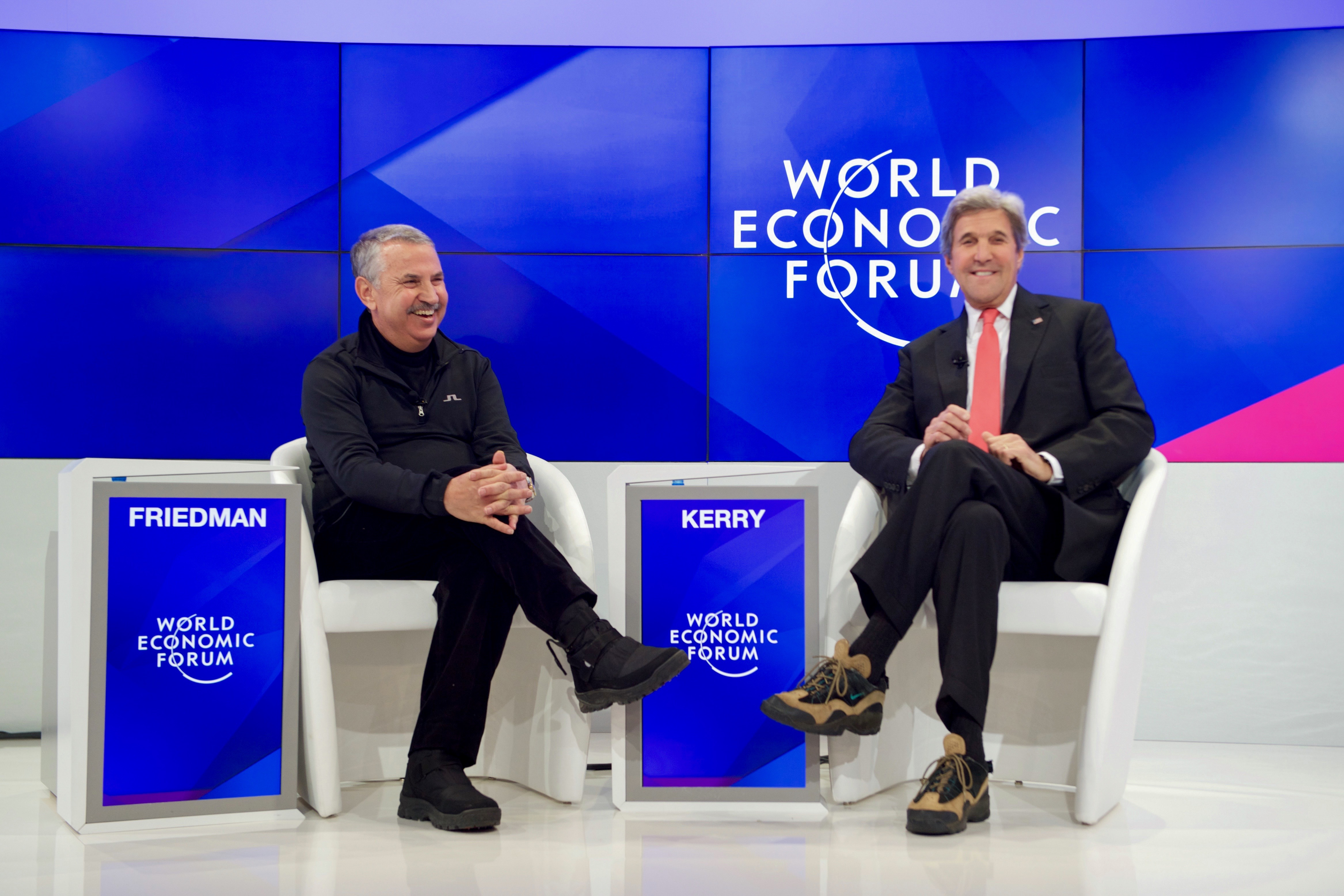
Friedman and U.S. Secretary of State John Kerry at the World Economic Forum in Davos, January 17, 2017

Friedman first discussed his views on globalization in the book The Lexus and the Olive Tree (1999). In 2004, visits to Bangalore, India, and Dalian, China, led Friedman to write a follow-up analysis, The World Is Flat (2005). Friedman believes that individual countries must sacrifice some degree of economic sovereignty to global institutions (such as capital markets and multinational corporations), a situation he has termed the "golden straitjacket".

In 2000, Friedman championed free trade with The People's Republic of China, making the prediction that free trade would make China more democratic. He has also expressed concern about the United States' lack of energy independence. He has stated, "First rule of oil—addicts never tell the truth to their pushers. We are the addicts, the oil producers are the pushers—we've never had an honest conversation with the Saudis."

In 2007, Friedman viewed American immigration laws as too restrictive and damaging to U.S. economic output: "It is pure idiocy that Congress will not open our borders—as wide as possible—to attract and keep the world's first-round intellectual draft choices in an age when everyone increasingly has the same innovation tools and the key differentiator is human talent."

After visiting the San Ysidro Port of Entry in San Diego, California, in early April 2019, Friedman wrote, "The whole day left me more certain than ever that we have a real immigration crisis and that the solution is a high wall with a big gate—but a smart gate."

=== Terrorism ===
After the September 11 attacks in 2001, Friedman's writing focused more on the threat of terrorism and the Middle East. He was awarded the 2002 Pulitzer Prize for Commentary "for his clarity of vision, based on extensive reporting, in commenting on the worldwide impact of the terrorist threat". These columns were collected and published in the book Longitudes and Attitudes. For a while, his reporting on post-9/11 topics led him to diverge from his prior interests in technological advances and globalization, until he began to research The World Is Flat.

After the 7/7 London bombings, Friedman called for the U.S. State Department to "shine a spotlight on hate speech wherever it appears", and to create a quarterly "War of Ideas Report, which would focus on those religious leaders and writers who are inciting violence against others". Friedman said the governmental speech-monitoring should go beyond those who actually advocate violence, and include also those whom former State Department spokesperson Jamie Rubin calls "excuse makers". In his July 22 column, Friedman wrote against the "excuses" made by terrorists or apologists who blame their actions on third-party influences or pressures. "After every major terrorist incident, the excuse makers come out to tell us ... why the terrorists acted. These excuse makers are just one notch less despicable than the terrorists and also deserve to be exposed. When you live in an open society like London, where anyone with a grievance can publish an article, run for office or start a political movement, the notion that blowing up a busload of innocent civilians in response to Iraq is somehow "understandable" is outrageous. "It erases the distinction between legitimate dissent and terrorism" Mr. Rubin said, "and an open society needs to maintain a clear wall between them." As part of their response to this column, the editors at FAIR encouraged their readers to contact Friedman and inform him that "opponents of the Iraq War do not deserve to be on a government blacklist-even if they oppose the war because they believe it encourages terrorism".

=== Kosovo War ===
During the 1999 NATO bombing of Yugoslavia, Friedman wrote the following in The New York Times: "It should be lights out in Belgrade: every power grid, water pipe, bridge, road and war-related factory has to be targeted. Like it or not, we are at war with the Serbian nation (the Serbs certainly think so), and the stakes have to be very clear: Every week you ravage Kosovo is another decade we will set your country back by pulverizing you. You want 1950? We can do 1950. You want 1389? We can do 1389 too." Later in the column, Friedman urged the U.S. to "[g]ive war a chance."

Fairness and Accuracy in Reporting (FAIR) labeled Friedman's remarks "war-mongering" and "crude race-hatred and war-crime agitation". Steve Chapman, critical of the response taken by NATO, referred to Friedman as "the most fervent supporter of the air war" and ironically asked in the Chicago Tribune: "Why stop at 1389? Why not revive the idea, proposed but never adopted in Vietnam, of bombing the enemy all the way back to the Stone Age?" Norman Solomon asserted in 2007 that "a tone of sadism could be discerned" in Friedman's article.

=== Iraq ===
Friedman supported the 2003 invasion of Iraq, writing that the establishment of a democratic state in the Middle East would force other countries in the region to liberalize and modernize. In his February 9, 2003, column for The Wall Street Journal, Friedman also pointed to the lack of compliance with the United Nations Security Council Resolution regarding Iraq's weapons of mass destruction:

The French position is utterly incoherent. The inspections have not worked yet, says Mr. de Villepin, because Saddam has not fully cooperated, and, therefore, we should triple the number of inspectors. But the inspections have failed not because of a shortage of inspectors. They have failed because of a shortage of compliance on Saddam's part, as the French know. The way you get that compliance out of a thug like Saddam is not by tripling the inspectors, but by tripling the threat that if he does not comply he will be faced with a U.N.-approved war.

Nevertheless, he found the incoherence of the American position to be an asset, arguing that "the axis-of-evil idea isn't thought through – but that's what I like about it. [...] There is a lot about the Bush team's foreign policy I don't like, but their willingness to restore our deterrence, and to be as crazy as some of our enemies, is one thing they have right. It is the only way we're going to get our turkey back."

After the invasion, Friedman expressed alarm over the post-invasion conduct of the war by the George W. Bush administration. Nevertheless, until his piece dated August 4, 2006 (see below), his columns remained hopeful for the possibility of a positive conclusion to the Iraq conflict (although his optimism appeared to steadily diminish as the conflict continued). Friedman chided George W. Bush and Tony Blair for "hyping" the evidence, and stated plainly that converting Iraq to democracy "would be a huge undertaking, though, and maybe impossible, given Iraq's fractious history". In January 2004, he participated in a forum on Slate called "Liberal Hawks Reconsider the Iraq War", in which he dismisses the justification for war based on Iraq's lack of compliance with the U.N. Resolutions:

The right reason for this war ... was to oust Saddam's regime and partner with the Iraqi people to try to implement the Arab Human Development report's prescriptions in the heart of the Arab world. That report said the Arab world is falling off the globe because of a lack of freedom, women's empowerment, and modern education. The right reason for this war was to partner with Arab moderates in a long-term strategy of dehumiliation and redignification.

In his September 29, 2005, column in The New York Times, Friedman entertained the idea of supporting the Kurds and Shias in a civil war against the Sunnis: "If they [the Sunnis] won't come around, we should arm the Shiites and Kurds and leave the Sunnis of Iraq to reap the wind."

Critics of Friedman's position on the Iraq War have noted his recurrent assertion that "the next six months" will prove critical in determining the outcome of the conflict. A study by Fairness and Accuracy in Reporting published in May 2006 cited 14 examples, spanning the previous two and a half years, of Friedman's declaring the next "few months" or "six months" as a decisive or critical period, beginning in November 2003. They described it as "a long series of similar do-or-die dates that never seem to get any closer". The blogger Atrios coined the neologism "Friedman Unit" to refer to this unit of time in relation to Iraq, noting its use as a supposedly critical window of opportunity.

In a live television interview aired June 11, 2006, on CNN, Howard Kurtz asked Friedman about the concept: "Now, I want to understand how a columnist's mind works when you take positions, because you were chided recently for writing several times in different occasions 'the next six months are crucial in Iraq.'" Friedman responded: "The fact is that the outcome there is unclear, and I reflected that in my column. And I will continue to reflect." Responding to prodding from Stephen Colbert, Friedman said in 2007: "We've run out of six months. It's really time to set a deadline."

=== Environment ===
In Iran's Great Weakness May Be Its Oil, Friedman challenges and debates conflicts about oil. Friedman states, "The best tool we have for curbing Iran's influence is not containment or engagement, but getting the price of oil down in the long term with conservation and an alternative-energy strategy. Let's exploit Iran's oil addiction by ending ours". In Hot, Flat, and Crowded, he says that "any car company that gets taxpayer money must demonstrate a plan for transforming every vehicle in its fleet to a hybrid-electric engine with flex-fuel capability, so its entire fleet can also run on next generation cellulosic ethanol".

In a Fresh Dialogues interview, Friedman described his motivations for writing the book: "My concern is about America.... Demand for clean energy, clean fuel and energy efficiency is clearly going to explode; it's going to be the next great global industry. I know that as sure as I know that I'm sitting here at De Anza College talking to you. By being big in the next big thing, we'll be seen by the rest of the world as working on the most important problem in the world." Some of Friedman's environmental critics question his support of still-undeveloped coal pollution mitigation technology ("clean coal") and coal mining as emblematic of Friedman's less than "green" commitment to renewable energy.

=== Israel ===
Friedman has been criticized by organizations such as Fairness and Accuracy in Reporting for defending Israeli airstrikes in Lebanon as a form of "educating" Israel's opponents; according to FAIR, Friedman was explicitly endorsing terrorism by Israel against Lebanese and Palestinians. Journalist Glenn Greenwald and professor Noam Chomsky also accused Friedman of endorsing and encouraging terrorism by Israeli forces. Randa Abdel-Fattah, a Palestinian-Australian academic and writer, has criticized Friedman over the language in an article named "Understanding the Middle East Through the Animal Kingdom". These allegations caused controversy at the 2024 Adelaide Writers' Week, with Friedman's scheduled streamed event not going ahead and Friedman saying that he had been uninvited. The Adelaide Writers' Week board, however, said that his eventual non-appearance was due to "timing" issues rather than the allegations made by Abdel-Fattah.

Political reporter Belen Fernandez heavily critiques Friedman's commentary regarding Israel. Among other criticisms, Fernandez singles out Friedman's suggestion that Israeli forces were unaware that their allied Lebanese militias carried out the Sabra and Shatila massacre while under their guard, contradicting the assessments of other journalists and observers; his encouragement of strong-armed force by the Israeli army against Palestinians; and his opposition to settlements only on the grounds that they are counter-productive, rather than because they violate international law or cause suffering for Palestinians. Fernandez suggests that Friedman is most worried about successfully maintaining Israel's Jewish ethnocracy and actively opposing a "one-man, one-vote" system of democracy.

Friedman has also come under criticism from supporters of Israel. In a February 2011 op-ed, Yitzhak Benhorin criticized Friedman's alleged suggestion that Israel relinquish territory it had occupied in the 1967 Middle Eastern War. In December of that year, Friedman also sparked criticism for writing that a standing ovation in Congress for Israeli Prime Minister Benjamin Netanyahu had been "bought and paid for by the Israel lobby." A letter from the American Jewish Committee objected that "Public opinion polls consistently show a high level of American ... support for and identification with Israel. This indicates that the people's elected representatives are fully reflecting the will of the voters." Friedman responded to criticism by writing: "In retrospect I probably should have used a more precise term like 'engineered' by the Israel lobby – a term that does not suggest grand conspiracy theories that I don't subscribe to."

In 2020, Friedman hailed the Trump-brokered peace agreement between Israel and the United Arab Emirates as "exactly what Trump said it was in his tweet: a 'HUGE breakthrough.'" In July 2023, as the Netanyahu government proposed new laws leading to judicial reform intended to limit the powers of Israel's Supreme Court, Friedman wrote an opinion piece supporting the Biden administration's changing diplomatic approach toward Israel. Following the outbreak of the Gaza war, Friedman urged Israel against military overreach and further settlement expansions, saying to do so otherwise would risk destabilizing the region and the US–Israel alliance.

=== China ===
In September 2009, Friedman wrote an article praising China's one-party autocracy, saying that China's leaders are "boosting gasoline prices" and "overtaking us in electric cars, solar power, energy efficiency, batteries, nuclear power and wind power." The article was in turn subject to critical analysis: Matt Lewis wrote, "Friedman's apparent wish for a 'benign' dictator is utopian, inasmuch as it ignores Lord Acton's warning that 'absolute power corrupts absolutely.'" William Easterly quoted Friedman's one-party autocracy assertions as part of an academic paper in which he concluded: "Formal theory and evidence provide little or no basis on which to believe the benevolent autocrat story" and that, "economists should retain their traditional skepticism for stories that have little good theory or empirics to support them."

In a July 2012 article in the NYT, however, Friedman also wrote that the current Chinese leadership had not used its surging economic growth to introduce gradual political reform and that, "Corruption is as bad as ever, institutionalized transparency and rule of law remain weak and consensual politics nonexistent." When asked if he had "China envy" during a Fresh Dialogues interview, Friedman replied, "You detect the envy of someone who wants his own government to act democratically with the same effectiveness that China can do autocratically." Likewise, in a 2011 interview with the BBC, Friedman stated that he wanted his children to live in a world where "there's a strong America counterbalancing a strong and thriving China, and not one where you have a strong and rising China and an America that is uncertain, weak and unable to project power economically and militarily it historically did."

Friedman's work is popular in China. His book The World is Flat was a bestseller in the country, although criticism of China in the book was removed when it was published in the country. A translated version of his article from The New York Times, "China Needs Its Own Dream", has been credited with popularizing the phrase "Chinese Dream" in China, a term that was later adopted as a slogan by General Secretary of the Chinese Communist Party Xi Jinping. Friedman, in the magazine Foreign Policy, has attributed the phrase to Peggy Liu and her environmental NGO JUCCCE.

In September 2020, Friedman told CNBC that "Trump is not the American president America deserves, in my opinion. But he definitely is the American president China deserved. We needed to have a president who was going to call the game with China. And Trump has done it, with I would say more grit and toughness than any of his predecessors. I give him credit for that." In November the same year, Friedman observed that Xi Jinping had brought about "an end to four decades of steady integration of China's economy with the West".

=== Iran ===
As the Iran nuclear deal agreement reached between Iran and a group of world powers (the P5+1). In Friedman's interview, he mentioned that "Our view of the Middle East is deeply colored by Israel, Saudi Arabia and Turkey and they all have their own interest. 15 of the 19 hijackers on 911 were from Saudi Arabia, none from Iran! Iranians had a spontaneous demonstration to support Americans on 911." He added, "What strikes you most about Iran (vs. Saudi Arabia) is that Iran has real politics... A country of 85 million people, a great civilization, many educated men and women, if they want to get a bomb they will get it. They have demonstrated they could do it under the most severe sanctions... Show me where Iranians have acted reckless [like Saddam Hussein]. These are survivors."

On February 2, 2024, Friedman penned an allegorical op-ed entitled, "Understanding the Middle East Through the Animal Kingdom", in which he posited Iran as a metaphorical "parasitoid wasp" with proxies in Yemen, Lebanon, Iraq, and Syria, as "caterpillars". Friedman claimed "We [America] have no counterstrategy that safely and efficiently kills the wasp without setting fire to the whole jungle". He concluded that he could "contemplate" the Middle East by watching Animal Planet. The New Arab reported that it had been criticized for racism and orientalism.

=== Radical centrism ===
In the 2010s, Friedman wrote several columns supporting the politics of radical centrism. In one he stated that, if the "radical center wants to be empowered, it can't just whine. It needs its own grass-roots movement". In another column Friedman promoted Americans Elect, an organization trying to field a radical-centrist candidate for the 2012 U.S. presidential election. That column decried "the two-party duopoly that has dominated American political life". Friedman's radical-centrist columns received a considerable amount of criticism, particularly from liberals.

Following the 250th anniversary of the United States, Friedman discussed how President Donald Trump has taken advantage of his supporters by selling meme coins that have lost value. Specifically, his column notes that it resulted in $3.81 billion in losses for his investors while he gained a $636 million payout. "That's a bumper sticker. Trump famously boasted that he could shoot someone in the middle of Fifth Avenue and his supporters would still be with him. Will they also stick with him when he fleeces them?"

== Personal life ==
Friedman's wife, Ann (née Bucksbaum) is a teacher and a native of Marshalltown, Iowa. A graduate of Stanford University and the London School of Economics, she is the daughter of real estate developer Matthew Bucksbaum, whom Friedman described as his "best friend". They were married in London on Thanksgiving Day 1978 and live in an 11,400-square-foot mansion in Bethesda, Maryland. They have two daughters, Orly (born 1985) and Natalie (born 1988).

Friedman supported Hillary Clinton for President of the United States in the 2016 election, and supported Michael Bloomberg in the 2020 primaries. He supported Joe Biden in the 2020 United States presidential election. Friedman is on the board of directors for Planet Word, a private museum dedicated to language arts in Washington, D.C.

== Awards ==
Friedman has won three Pulitzer Prizes:

- 1983: for his coverage of the war in Lebanon. A distinguished example of international reporting
- 1988: for coverage of Israel: a distinguished example of reporting on international affairs
- 2002: for his commentary illuminating the worldwide impact of the terrorist threat

== Published works ==
- From Beirut to Jerusalem : One Man's Middle Eastern Odyssey (1989; expanded edition 1990) – winner of the National Book Award in its first edition
- The Lexus and the Olive Tree: Understanding Globalization (1999; revised edition 2000)
- Longitudes and Attitudes: Exploring the World After September 11 (2002; reprinted 2003 as Longitudes and Attitudes: The World in the Age of Terrorism)
- The World Is Flat: A Brief History of the Twenty-first Century (2005; expanded edition 2006; revised edition 2007)
- Hot, Flat, and Crowded: Why We Need a Green Revolution—And How It Can Renew America (2008)
- That Used to Be Us: How America Fell Behind in the World It Invented and How We Can Come Back (Co-written with Michael Mandelbaum 2011)
- Thank You for Being Late: Finding a Job, Running a Country, and Keeping Your Head in an Age of Accelerations (November 2016)

== See also ==
- Curiosity quotient
- New Yorkers in journalism
